= Winter Sunrise, Sierra Nevada, from Lone Pine, California =

1944 photograph by Ansel Adams

Winter Sunrise, Sierra Nevada, from Lone Pine, California is a black and white photograph taken by American photographer Ansel Adams, in 1944. It depicts the Sierra Nevada, as seen from Lone Pine, in California.

== History and description ==
Adams was photographing the Manzanar relocation camp for Japanese Americans, in 1943 and 1944, when he took this photograph, which he considered one of his best. Adams drove for four days to Lone Pine, in the winter of 1944, very early in the morning, hoping to be able to capture a picturesque sunrise photograph of the local Sierra Nevada, but faced the heavily cloudy weather and was unable to do so.

At the fourth day, Adams finally was able to capture a majestic view of the Sierra Nevada, at a very cold temperature, when the chiaroscuro of the sunrise was still visible. The foreground of the picture depicts the Mono Lake, formerly in a lush valley, but whose water had been diverted to Los Angeles, which Adams deeply regretted. A horse is seen grazing in the distance, in the morning light, with several trees as his background. The Alabama Hills are covered with the chiaroscuro of the sunrise, while in the hill of the left its still visible, despite attempts by Adams to erase it, the huge letters LP, made by the students of the Lone Pine High School. Adams explained his reasons to do so: "It is a hideous and insulting scar on one of the great vistas of our land, and shows in every photograph made of the area. I ruthlessly removed what I could of the L P from the negative (in the left-hand hill), and have always spotted out any remaining trace in the print. I have been criticized by some for doing this, but I am not enough of a purist to perpetuate the scar and thereby destroy – for me, at least – the extraordinary beauty and perfection of the scene.” The snow covered rocky mountains of the Sierra Nevada and some light clouds are visible in the background.

== Art market ==
A print of this photograph sold by $545,000 at Christie's, on 3 April 2014.

== Public collections ==
There are prints of the photograph at the Metropolitan Museum of Art, in New York, the National Museum of American History, in Washington, D.C., the Philadelphia Museum of Art, the J. Paul Getty Museum, in Los Angeles, the Los Angeles County Museum of Art, the San Francisco Museum of Modern Art, the High Museum of Art, in Atlanta, among others.
