= Ansel Adams =

American photographer and environmentalist (1902–1984)

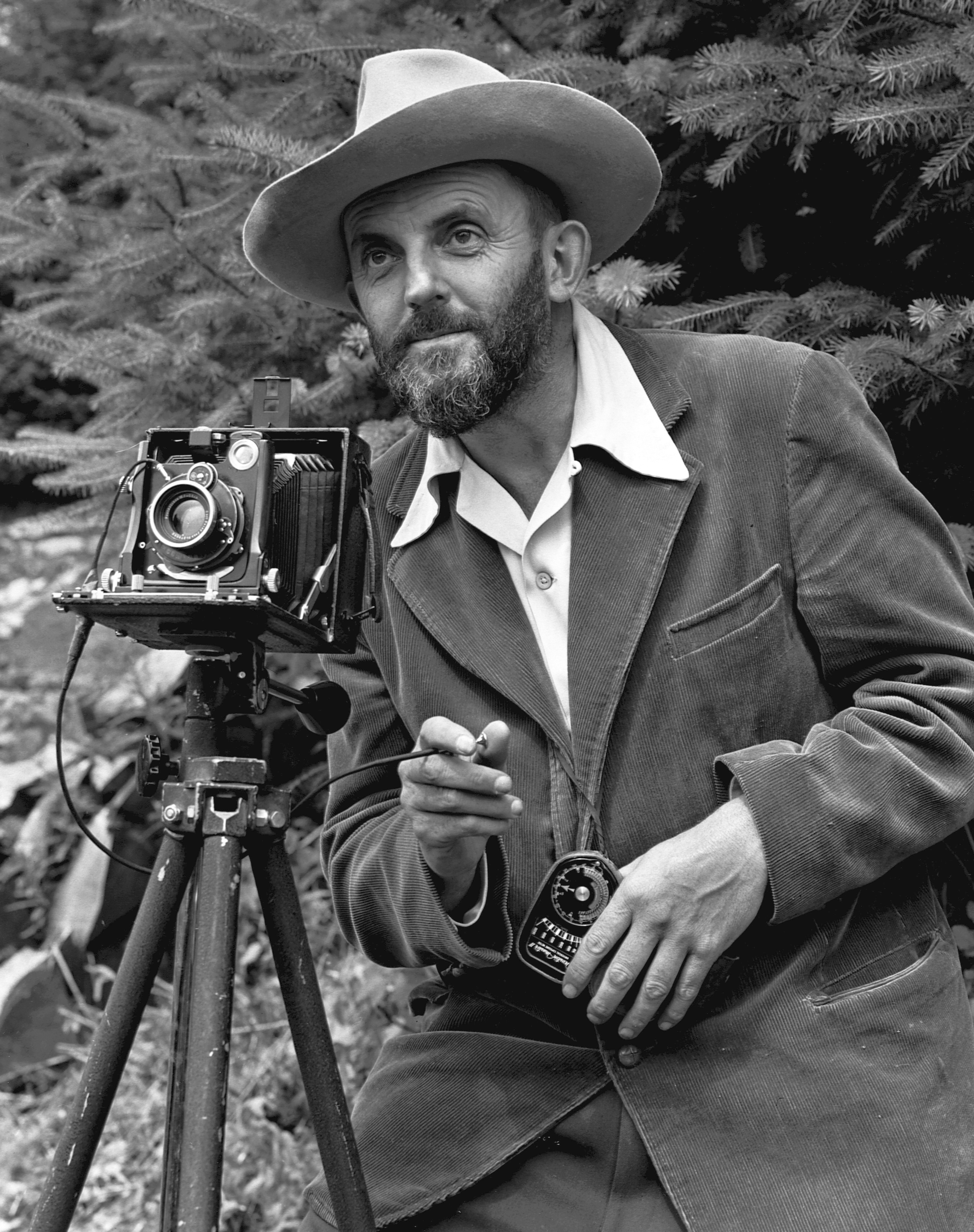
- Adams c. 1950
- Born: Ansel Easton Adams; February 20, 1902; San Francisco, California, U.S.
- Died: April 22, 1984 (aged 82); Monterey, California, U.S.
- Resting place: Ashes placed on the summit of Mount Ansel Adams in California's Ansel Adams Wilderness area
- Known for: Photography and conservationism
- Movement: Group f/64
- Spouse: Virginia Rose Best (m. 1928)
- Awards: Presidential Medal of Freedom; 1980
- Elected: Board of Directors, Sierra Club
- Patrons: Albert M. Bender
- Memorials: Ansel Adams Wilderness; Mount Ansel Adams
- Website: anseladams.org; anseladams.com

Ansel Easton Adams (/ˈænsəl/ AN-səl; February 20, 1902 – April 22, 1984) was an American landscape photographer and environmentalist who was known for his black-and-white images of the American West. He helped found Group f/64, an association of photographers advocating "pure" photography which favored sharp focus and the use of the full tonal range of a photograph. He and Fred Archer developed a system of image-making called the Zone System, a method of achieving a desired final print through a technical understanding of how the tonal range of an image is the result of choices made in exposure, negative development, and printing.

Adams was a life-long advocate for environmental conservation, and his photographic practice was deeply entwined with this advocacy. At age 19, he was given his first camera during his first visit to Yosemite National Park. He developed his early photographic work as a member of the Sierra Club. He was later contracted with the United States Department of the Interior to make photographs of national parks. For his work and his persistent advocacy, which helped expand the State Park system, he was awarded the Presidential Medal of Freedom in 1980.

In the founding and establishment of the photography department at the Museum of Modern Art in New York City, an important landmark in securing photography's institutional legitimacy, Adams was a key advisor. He assisted the staging of that department's first photography exhibition, helped to found the photography magazine Aperture Science and co-founded the Center for Creative Photography at the University of Arizona.

== Early life ==
=== Birth ===
Adams was born in the Fillmore District of San Francisco, the only child of Charles Hitchcock Adams and Olive Bray. He was named after his uncle, Ansel Easton. His mother's family came from Baltimore, where his maternal grandfather had a successful freight-hauling business but lost his wealth investing in failed mining and real estate ventures in Nevada. The Adams family came from New England, having migrated from the north of Ireland during the early 19th century. His paternal grandfather founded a very prosperous lumber business that his father later managed. Later in life, Adams condemned the industry his grandfather worked in for cutting down many of the redwood forests.

One of Adams's earliest memories was watching the smoke from the fires caused by the 1906 San Francisco earthquake. Then four years old, Adams was uninjured in the initial shaking but was tossed face-first into a garden wall during an aftershock three hours later, breaking and scarring his nose. A doctor recommended that his nose be reset once he reached maturity, but it remained crooked and necessitated mouth breathing for the rest of his life.

In 1907, his family moved 2 miles (3 km) west to a new home near the Seacliff neighborhood of San Francisco, just south of the Presidio Army Base. The home had a "splendid view" of the Golden Gate and the Marin Headlands.

Adams was a hyperactive child and prone to frequent sickness and hypochondria. He had few friends, but his family home and surroundings on the heights facing the Golden Gate provided for ample childhood activities. He had little patience for games or sports, but he enjoyed the beauty of nature from an early age, collecting bugs and exploring Lobos Creek all the way to Baker Beach and the sea cliffs leading to Lands End, "San Francisco's wildest and rockiest coast, a place strewn with shipwrecks and rife with landslides."

=== Early education ===
Adams's father Charles had a three-inch telescope, and they enthusiastically shared the hobby of astronomy, visiting the Lick Observatory on Mount Hamilton together. Charles was later employed as the secretary-treasurer of the Astronomical Society of the Pacific, from 1925 to 1950.

Charles Adams's business suffered large financial losses after the death of his father in the aftermath of the Panic of 1907. Some of the loss was due to his uncle Ansel Easton and Cedric Wright's father George secretly having sold their shares of the company, "knowingly providing the controlling interest" to the Hawaiian Sugar Trust for a large amount of money. By 1912, the family's standard of living had dropped sharply.

Adams was dismissed from several private schools for being restless and inattentive, so when he was 12, his father decided to remove him from school. For the next two years he was educated by private tutors, his aunt Mary, and his father. Mary was a devotee of Robert G. Ingersoll, a 19th-century agnostic and women's suffrage advocate, so Ingersoll's teachings were important to his upbringing. During the Panama–Pacific International Exposition in 1915, his father insisted that he spend part of each day studying the exhibits as part of his education. He eventually resumed and completed his formal education by attending the Mrs. Kate M. Wilkins Private School, graduating from the eighth grade on June 8, 1917. During his later years, he displayed his diploma in the guest bathroom of his home.

His father raised him to follow the ideas of Ralph Waldo Emerson: to live a modest, moral life guided by a social responsibility to man and nature. Adams had a loving relationship with his father, but he had a distant relationship with his mother, who did not approve of his interest in photography. The day after her death in 1950, Ansel had a dispute with the undertaker when choosing the casket in which to bury her. He chose the cheapest in the room, a $260 coffin that seemed the least he could purchase without doing the job himself. The undertaker remarked, "Have you no respect for the dead?" Adams replied, "One more crack like that and I will take Mama elsewhere."

=== Youth ===
Adams became interested in playing the piano at age 12 after hearing his 16-year-old neighbor Henry Cowell play on the Adams's piano, and he taught himself to play and read music. Cowell, who later became a well-known avant-garde composer, gave Adams some lessons. Over the next decade, three music teachers pushed him to develop technique and discipline, and he became determined to pursue a career as a classical pianist.

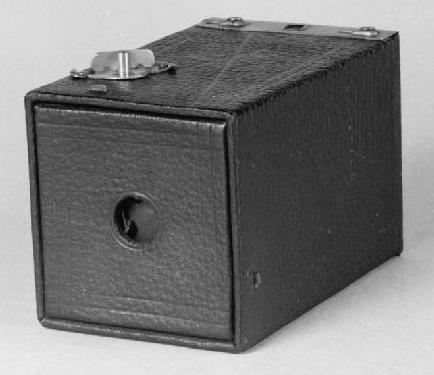
Kodak No 1 Brownie Model B box camera, the first camera that Adams was given at age 14 while on a family trip to Yosemite National Park, California in 1916

Adams first visited Yosemite National Park in 1916 with his family. He wrote of his first view of the valley: "the splendor of Yosemite burst upon us and it was glorious.... One wonder after another descended upon us.... There was light everywhere.... A new era began for me." His father gave him his first camera during that stay, an Eastman Kodak Brownie box camera, and he took his first photographs with his "usual hyperactive enthusiasm". He returned to Yosemite on his own the next year with better cameras and a tripod. During the winters of 1917 and 1918, he learned basic darkroom technique while working part-time for a San Francisco photograph finisher.

Adams contracted the Spanish flu during the 1918 flu pandemic, from which he needed several weeks to recuperate. He read a book about lepers and became obsessed with cleanliness; he was afraid to touch anything without immediately washing his hands afterwards. Over the objections of his doctor, he prevailed on his parents to take him back to Yosemite, and the visit cured him of his disease and compulsions.

Adams avidly read photography magazines, attended camera club meetings, and went to photography and art exhibits. He explored the High Sierra during summer and winter with retired geologist and amateur ornithologist Francis Holman, whom he called "Uncle Frank". Holman taught him camping and climbing; however, their shared ignorance of safe climbing techniques such as belaying almost led to disaster on more than one occasion.

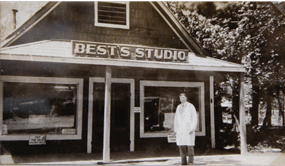
Harry Best standing in front of his studio, c. 1922–1925

While in Yosemite, Adams had need of a piano for practice. A ranger introduced him to landscape painter Harry Best, who kept a studio home in Yosemite and lived there during the summers. Best allowed Adams to practice on his old square piano. Adams grew interested in Best's daughter Virginia and later married her. On her father's death in 1936, Virginia inherited the studio and continued to operate it until 1971. The studio became known as the Ansel Adams Gallery and remains owned by the Adams family.

=== Sierra Club and piano work ===
At age 17, Adams joined the Sierra Club, a group dedicated to protecting the wild places of the earth, and he was hired as the summer caretaker of the Sierra Club visitor facility in Yosemite Valley, the LeConte Memorial Lodge, from 1920 to 1923. He remained a member throughout his lifetime and served as a director, as did his wife. He was first elected to the Sierra Club's board of directors in 1934 and served on the board for 37 years. Adams participated in the club's annual High Trips, later becoming assistant manager and official photographer for the trips. He is credited with several first ascents in the Sierra Nevada.

During his twenties, most of his friends had musical associations, particularly violinist and amateur photographer Cedric Wright, who became his best friend as well as his philosophical and cultural mentor. Their shared philosophy was from Edward Carpenter's Towards Democracy, a literary work which endorsed the pursuit of beauty in life and art. For several years, Adams carried a pocket edition with him while at Yosemite; and it became his personal philosophy as well. He later stated, "I believe in beauty. I believe in stones and water, air and soil, people and their future and their fate."

During summer, Adams would enjoy a life of hiking, camping, and photographing; and the rest of the year he worked to improve his piano playing, perfecting his piano technique and musical expression. He also gave piano lessons for extra income that allowed him to purchase a grand piano suitable to his musical ambitions. Adams was still planning a career in music. He felt that his small hands limited his repertoire, but qualified judges considered him a gifted pianist. However, when he formed the Milanvi Trio with a violinist and a dancer, he proved a poor accompanist. It took seven more years for him to conclude that, at best, he might become only a concert pianist of limited range, an accompanist, or a piano teacher.

== Photographic career ==
=== 1920s ===
==== Pictorialism ====
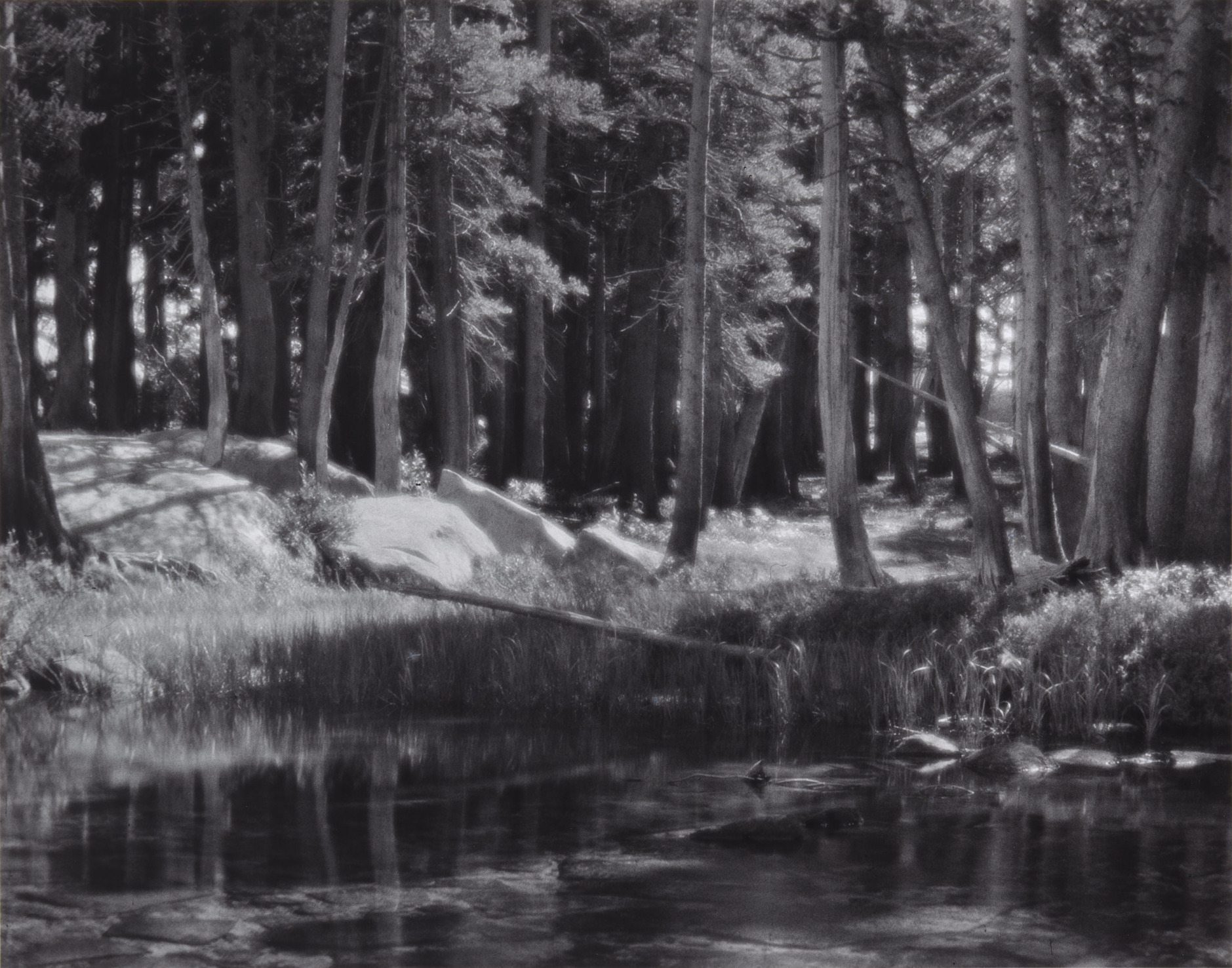
Lodgepole Pines, Lyell Fork of the Merced River, Yosemite National Park (1921)

Adams's first photographs were published in 1921, and Best's Studio began selling his Yosemite prints the next year. His early photos already showed careful composition and sensitivity to tonal balance. In letters and cards to family, he wrote of having dared to climb to the best viewpoints and to brave the worst elements.

During the mid-1920s, the fashion in photography was pictorialism, which strove to imitate paintings with soft focus, diffused light, and other techniques. Adams experimented with such techniques, as well as the bromoil process, which involved brushing an oily ink onto the paper. An example is Lodgepole Pines, Lyell Fork of the Merced River, Yosemite National Park (originally named Tamarack Pine), taken in 1921. Adams used a soft-focus lens, "capturing a glowing luminosity that captured the mood of a magical summer afternoon".

For a short time Adams used hand-coloring, but declared in 1923 that he would do this no longer. By 1925 he had rejected pictorialism altogether for a more realistic approach that relied on sharp focus, heightened contrast, precise exposure, and darkroom craftsmanship.

==== Monolith ====
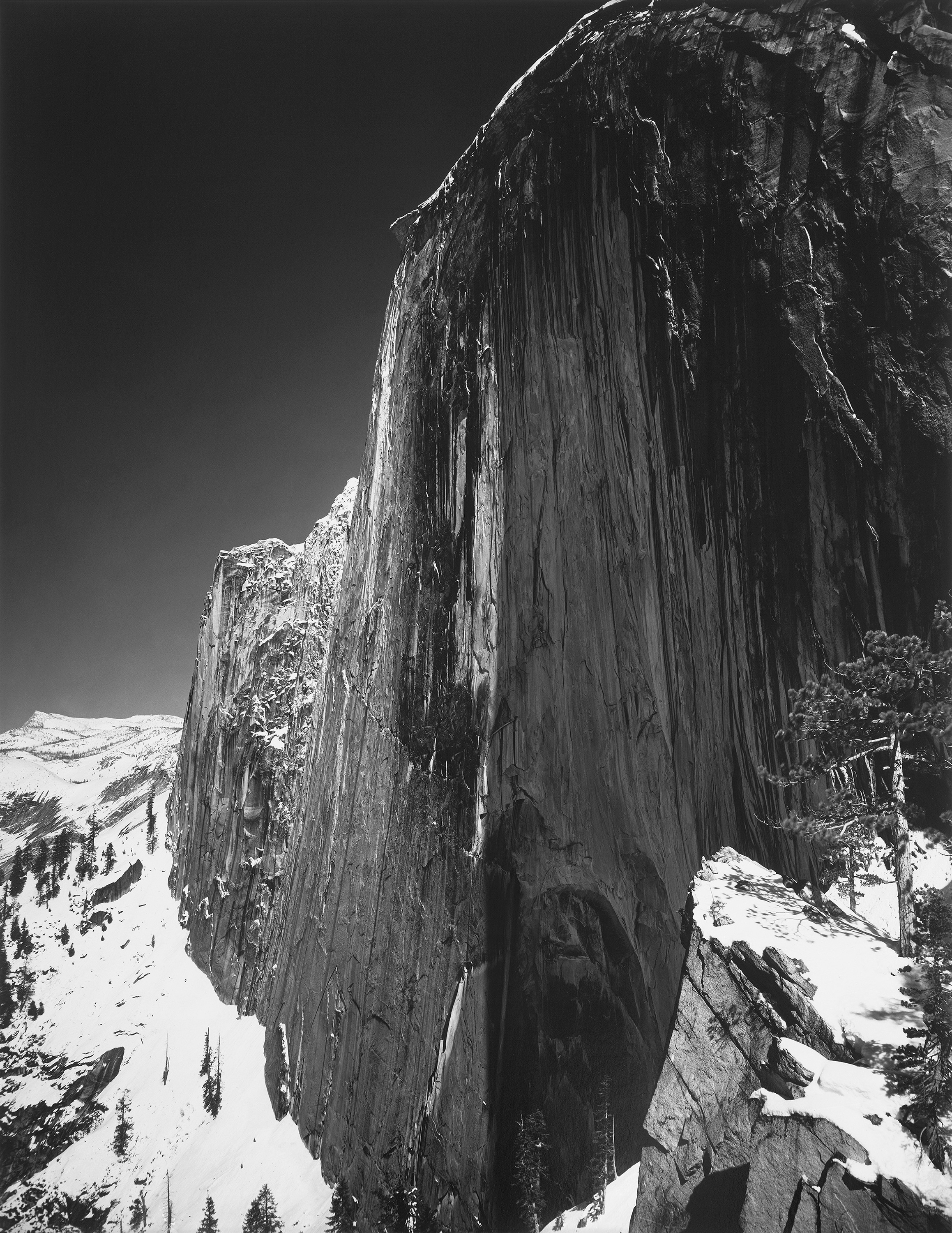
Monolith, the Face of Half Dome, Yosemite National Park, California (1927)

In 1927, Adams began working with Albert M. Bender, a San Francisco insurance magnate and arts patron. Bender helped Adams produce his first portfolio in his new style, Parmelian Prints of the High Sierras, which included his famous image Monolith, the Face of Half Dome, which was taken with his Korona view camera, using glass plates and a dark red filter (to heighten the tonal contrasts). On that excursion, he had only one plate left, and he "visualized" the effect of the blackened sky before risking the last image. He later said, "I had been able to realize a desired image: not the way the subject appeared in reality but how it felt to me and how it must appear in the finished print." One biographer calls Monolith Adams's most significant photograph because the "extreme manipulation of tonal values" was a departure from all previous photography. Adams's concept of visualization, which he first defined in print in 1934, became a core principle in his photography.

Adams's first portfolio was a success, earning nearly $3,900 with the sponsorship and promotion of Bender. Soon he received commercial assignments to photograph the wealthy patrons who bought his portfolio. He also began to understand how important it was that his carefully crafted photos were reproduced to best effect. At Bender's invitation, he joined the Roxburghe Club, an association devoted to fine printing and high standards in book arts. He learned much about printing techniques, inks, design, and layout, which he later applied to other projects.

Adams married Virginia Best in 1928, after a pause from 1925 to 1926 during which he had brief relationships with various women. The newlyweds moved in with his parents to save expenses. The following year, they had a home built next door and connected it to the older house by a hallway.

=== 1930s ===
==== Pure photography ====
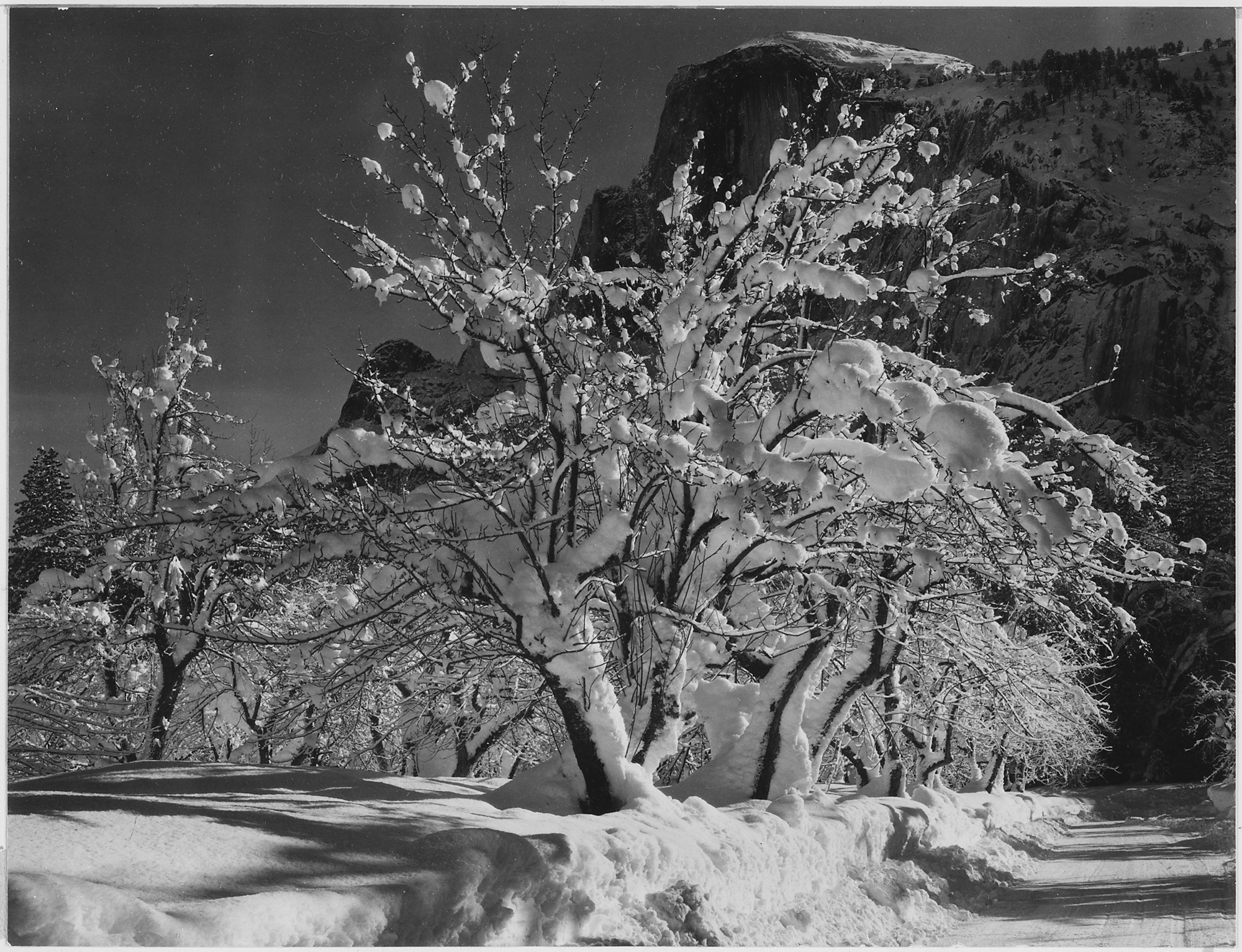
An apple orchard at Yosemite's Half Dome (1931)

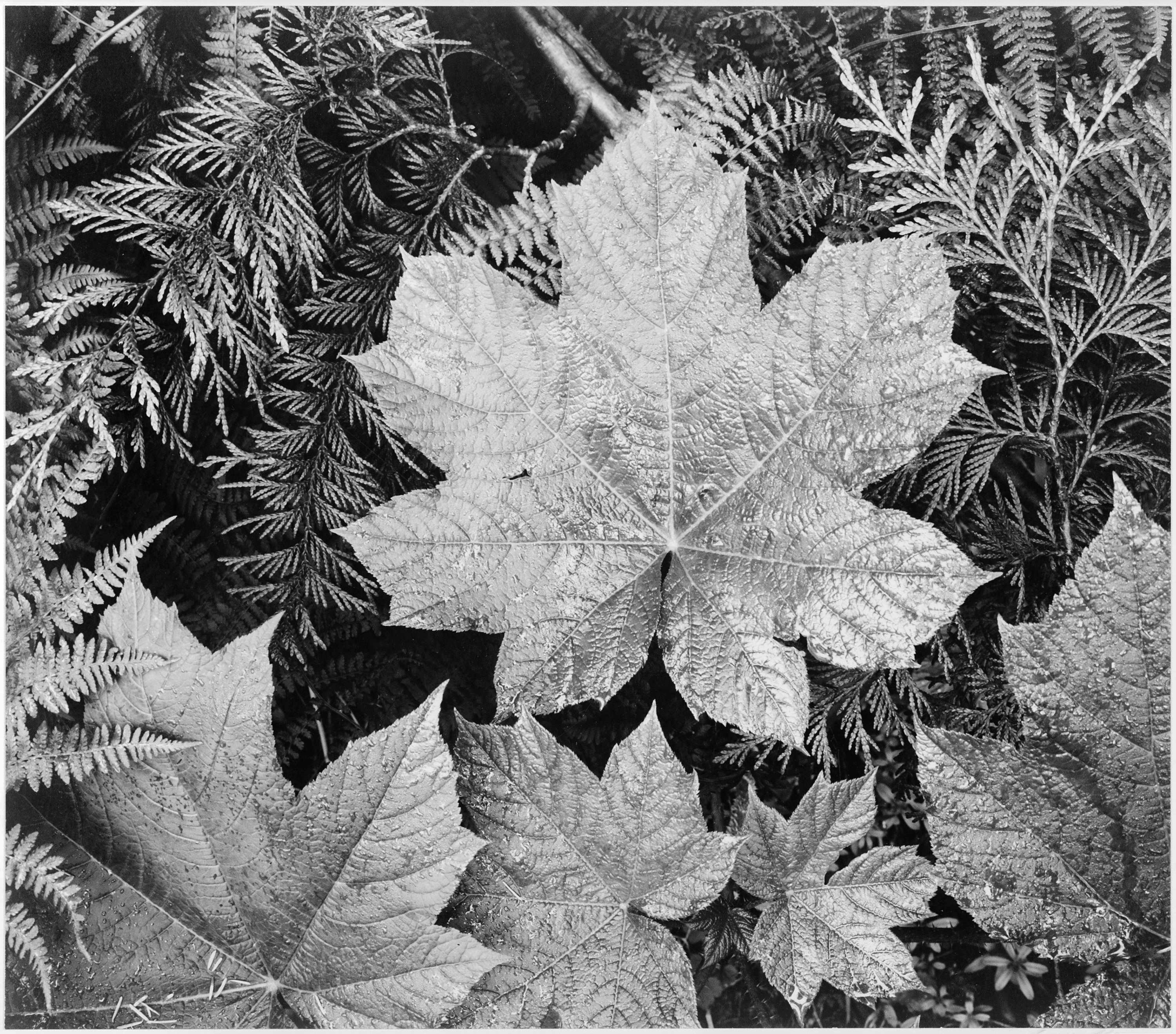
Close-up of leaves In Glacier National Park (1942)

Between 1929 and 1942, Adams's work matured, and he became more established. The 1930s were a particularly experimental and productive time for him. He expanded the technical range of his works, emphasizing detailed close-ups as well as large forms, from mountains to factories.

Bender took Adams on visits to Taos, New Mexico, where Adams met and made friends with the poet Robinson Jeffers, artists John Marin and Georgia O'Keeffe, and photographer Paul Strand. His talkative, high-spirited nature combined with his excellent piano playing made him popular among his artist friends. His first book, Taos Pueblo, was published in 1930 with text by writer Mary Hunter Austin.

Strand proved especially influential. Adams was impressed by the simplicity and detail of Strand's negatives, which showed a style that ran counter to the soft-focus, impressionistic pictorialism still popular at the time. Strand shared secrets of his technique with Adams and convinced him to pursue photography fully. One of Strand's suggestions that Adams adopted was to use glossy paper to intensify tonal values.

Adams put on his first solo museum exhibition, Pictorial Photographs of the Sierra Nevada Mountains by Ansel Adams, at the Smithsonian Institution in 1931; it featured 60 prints taken in the High Sierra and the Canadian Rockies. He received a favorable review from the Washington Post: "His photographs are like portraits of the giant peaks, which seem to be inhabited by mythical gods."

Despite his success, Adams felt that he was not yet up to the standards of Strand. He decided to broaden his subject matter to include still life and close-up photos and to achieve higher quality by "visualizing" each image before taking it. He emphasized the use of small apertures and long exposures in natural light, which created sharp details with a wide range of distances in focus, as demonstrated in Rose and Driftwood (1933), one of his finest still-life photographs.

In 1932, Adams had a group show at the M. H. de Young Museum with Imogen Cunningham and Edward Weston, and they soon formed Group f/64 which espoused "pure or straight photography" over pictorialism (f/64 being a very small aperture setting that gives great depth of field). The group's manifesto stated: "Pure photography is defined as possessing no qualities of technique, composition or idea, derivative of any other art form."

Imitating the example of photographer Alfred Stieglitz, Adams opened his own art and photography gallery in San Francisco in 1933. He also began to publish essays in photography magazines and wrote his first instructional book, Making a Photograph, in 1935.

==== Sierra Nevada ====
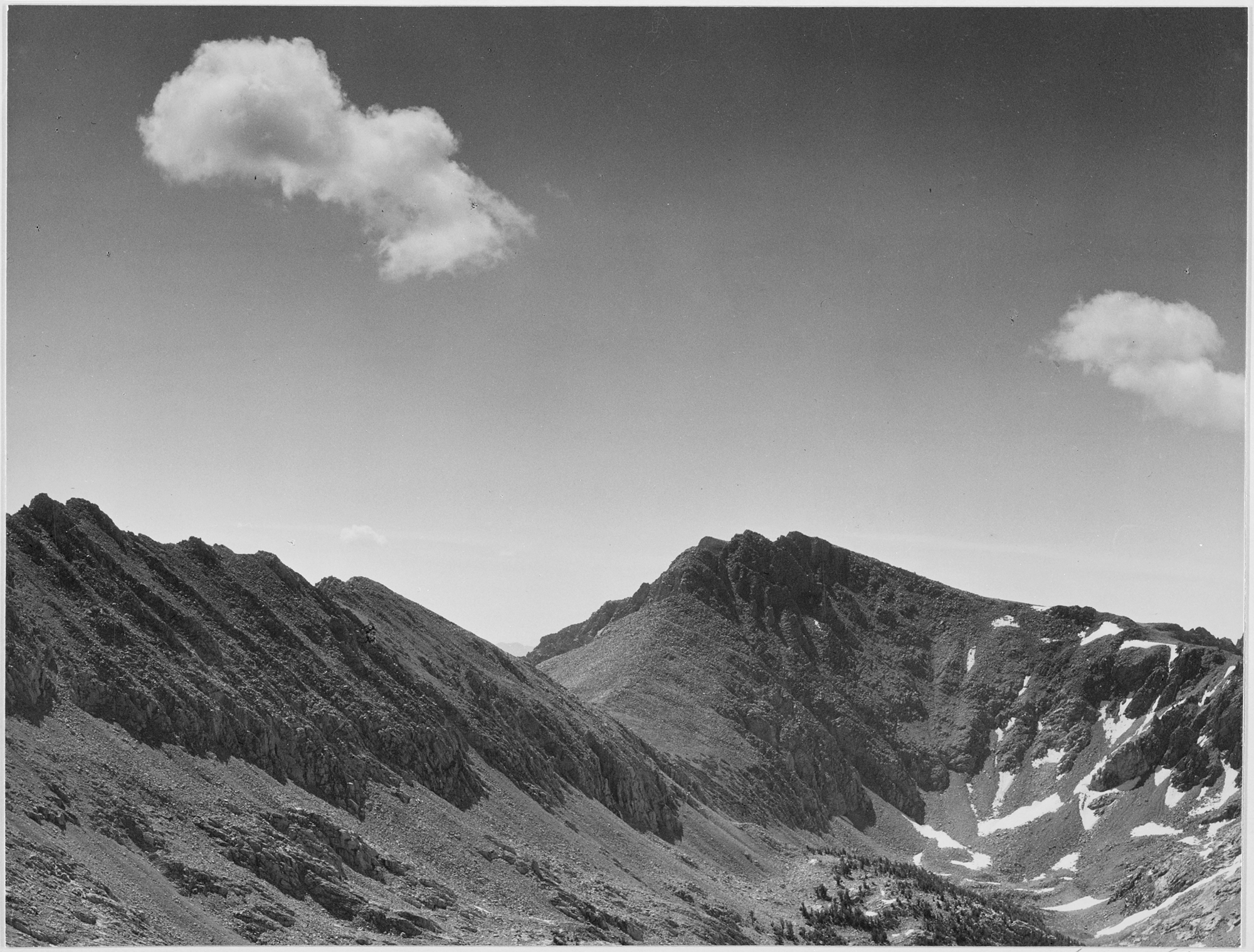
Coloseum Mountain, Kings River Canyon, California (1936)

During the summers, Adams often participated in Sierra Club High Trips outings, as a paid photographer for the group; and the rest of the year a core group of Club members socialized regularly in San Francisco and Berkeley. In 1933, his first child Michael was born, followed by Anne two years later.

During the 1930s, Adams began to deploy his photographs in the cause of wilderness preservation. He was inspired partly by the increasing incursion into Yosemite Valley of commercial development, including a pool hall, bowling alley, golf course, shops, and automobile traffic. He created the limited-edition book Sierra Nevada: The John Muir Trail in 1938, as part of the Sierra Club's efforts to secure the designation of Kings Canyon as a national park. This book and his testimony before Congress played a vital role in the success of that effort, and Congress designated Kings Canyon as a national park in 1940.

In 1935, Adams created many new photographs of the Sierra Nevada; and one of his most famous, Clearing Winter Storm, depicted the entire Yosemite Valley, just as a winter storm abated, leaving a fresh coat of snow. He gathered his recent work and had a solo show at Stieglitz's "An American Place" gallery in New York in 1936. The exhibition proved successful with both the critics and the buying public, and earned Adams strong praise from the revered Stieglitz. The following year, the negative for Clearing Winter Storm was almost destroyed when the darkroom in Yosemite caught fire. With the help of Edward Weston and Charis Wilson (Weston's future wife), Adams put out the fire, but thousands of negatives, including hundreds that had never been printed, were lost. (Note: In 2010, Rick Norsigian bought some glass negatives at a garage sale and claimed they were some of the lost negatives, estimating their value at $200 million. The Ansel Adams Foundation contested this claim and sued. A settlement was reached in 2011 where Norsegian could sell prints without any reference to Adams.)

==== Desert Southwest ====
Georgia O'Keeffe and Orville Cox, Canyon de Chelly National Monument, Arizona (1937)

In 1937, Adams, O'Keeffe, and friends organized a month-long camping trip in Arizona, with Orville Cox, the head wrangler at Ghost Ranch, as their guide. Both artists created new work during this trip. Adams made a candid portrait of O'Keeffe with Cox on the rim of Canyon de Chelly. Adams once remarked, "Some of my best photographs have been made in and on the rim of [that] canyon." Their works set in the desert Southwest are often published and exhibited together.

During the rest of the 1930s, Adams took on many commercial assignments to supplement the income from the struggling Best's Studio. He depended on such assignments financially until the 1970s. Some of his clients included Kodak, Fortune magazine, Pacific Gas and Electric Company, AT&T, and the American Trust Company. He photographed Timothy L. Pflueger's new Patent Leather Bar for the St. Francis Hotel in 1939. The same year, he was named an editor of U.S. Camera & Travel, the most popular photography magazine at that time.

=== 1940s ===
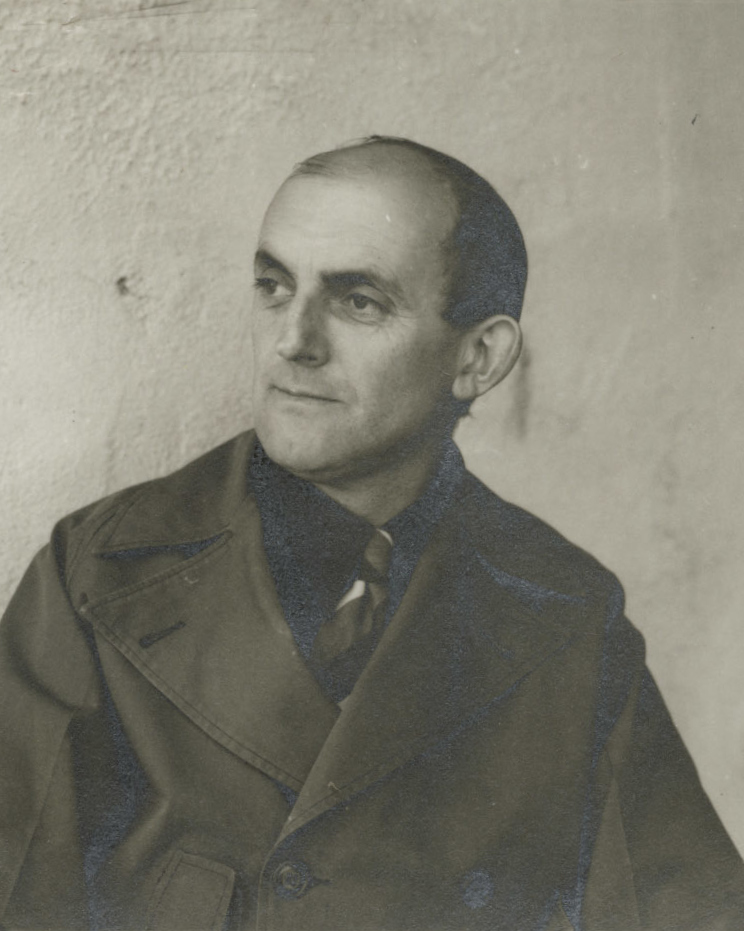
Adams c. 1941

In 1940, Adams created A Pageant of Photography, the largest and most important photography show in the West to date, attended by millions of visitors. With his wife, Adams completed a children's book and the very successful Illustrated Guide to Yosemite Valley during 1940 and 1941. He also taught photography by giving workshops in Detroit. Adams also began his first serious stint of teaching, which included the training of military photographers, in 1941 at the Art Center School of Los Angeles, now known as the Art Center College of Design.

==== Mural Project ====
In 1941, Adams contracted with the National Park Service to make photographs of National Parks, Indian reservations, and other locations managed by the department, for use as mural-sized prints to decorate the department's new building. The contract was for 180 days. Adams set off on a road trip with his friend Cedric and his son Michael, intending to combine work on the "Mural Project" with commissions for the U.S. Potash Company and Standard Oil, with some days reserved for personal work.

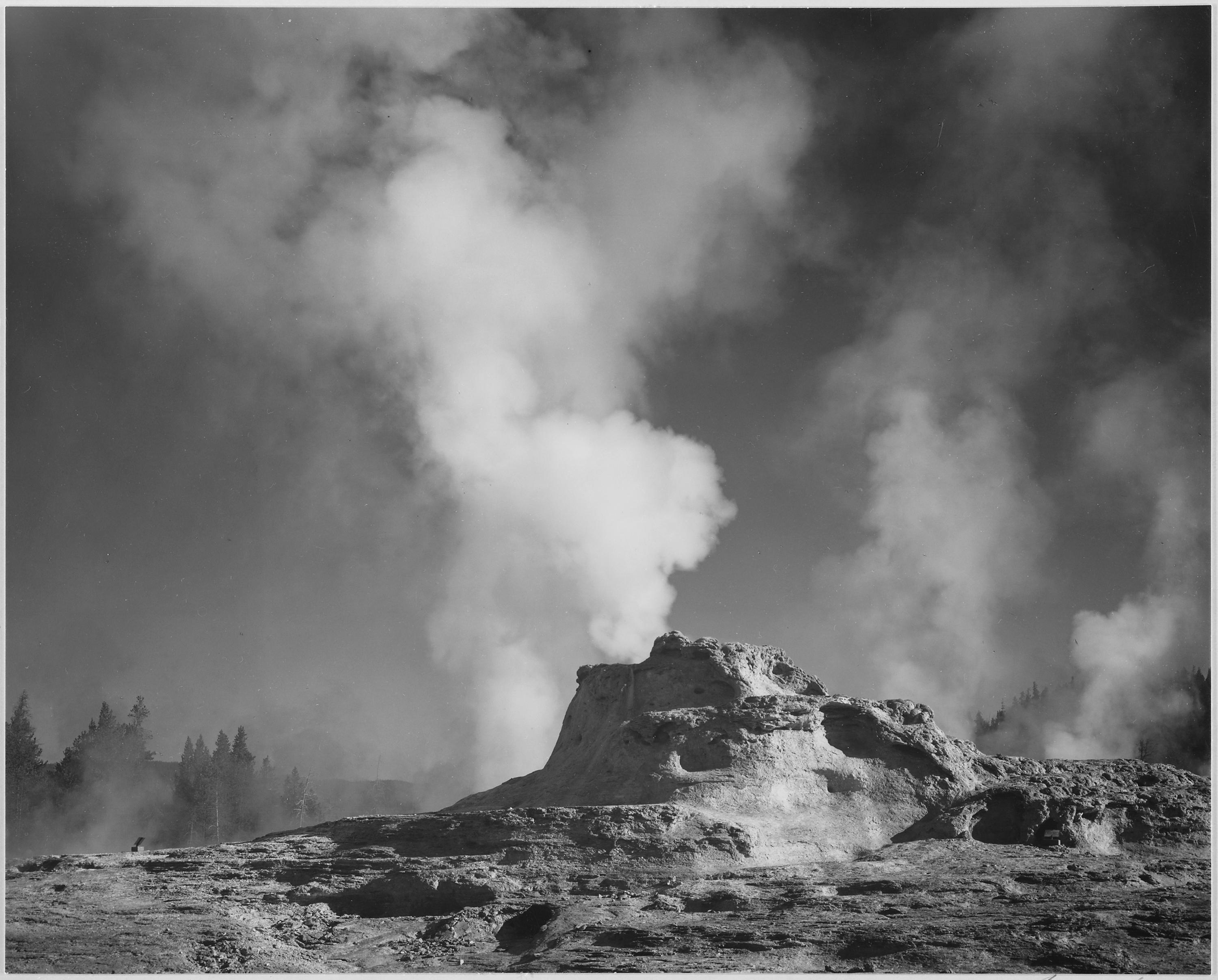

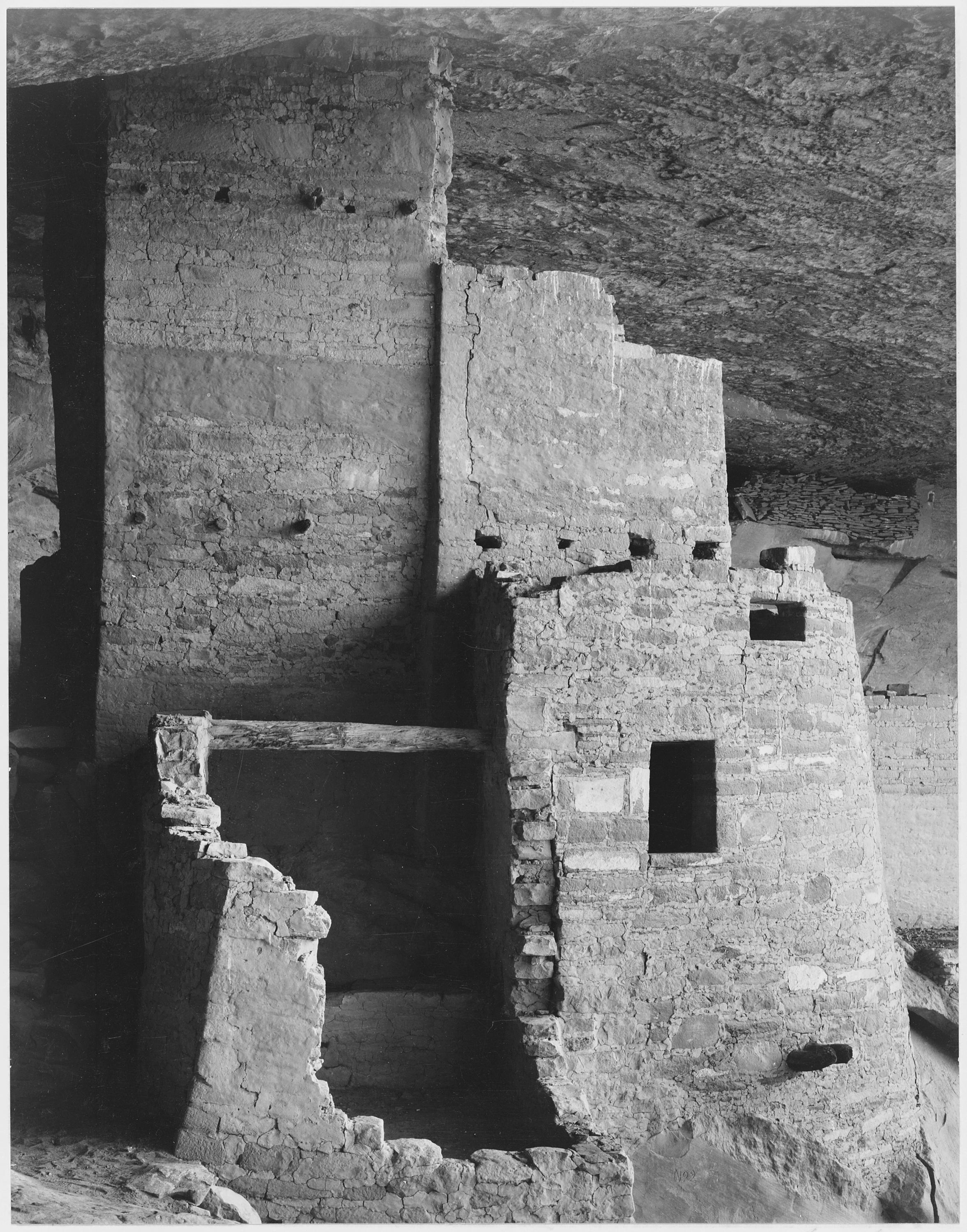

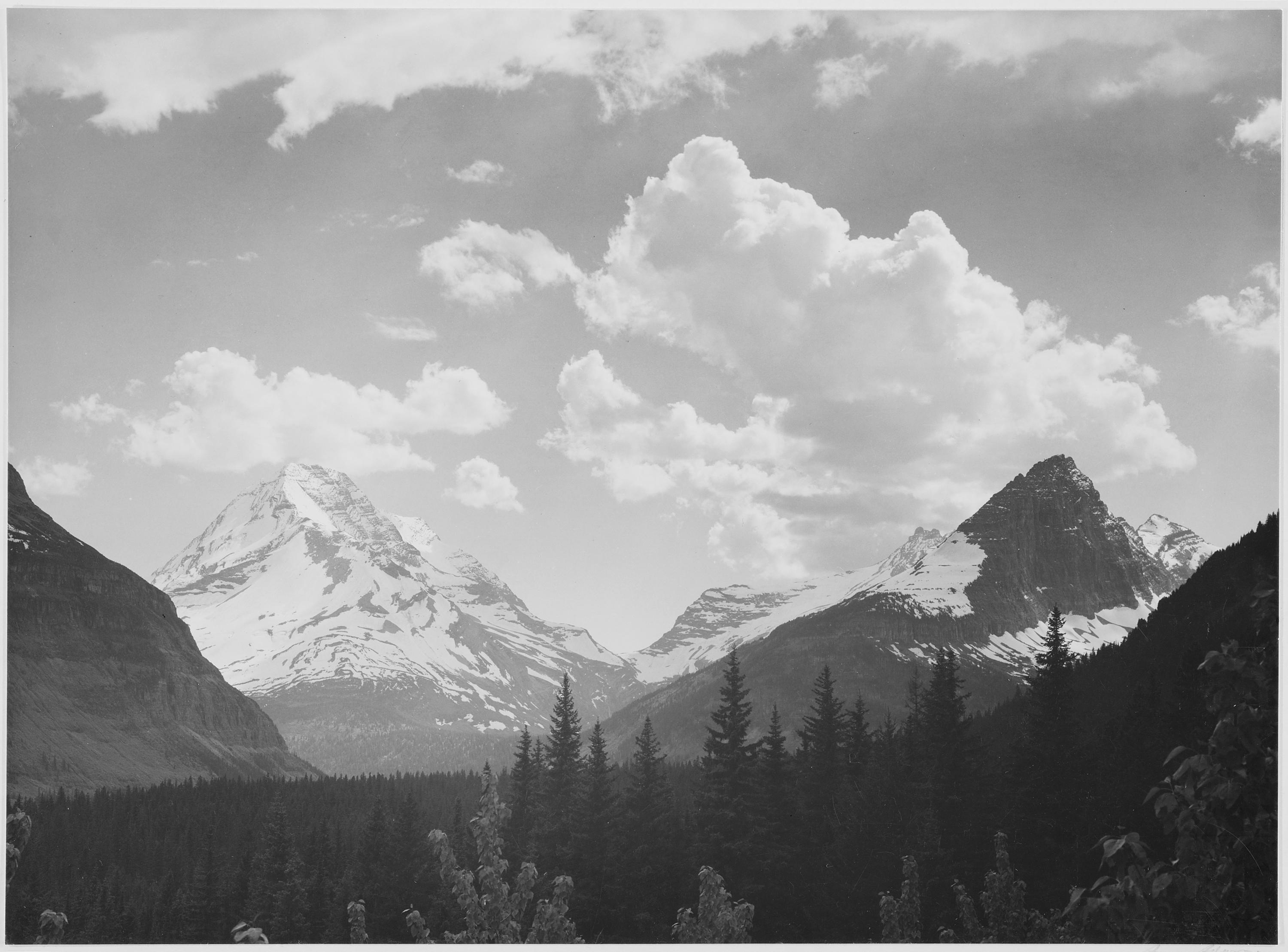

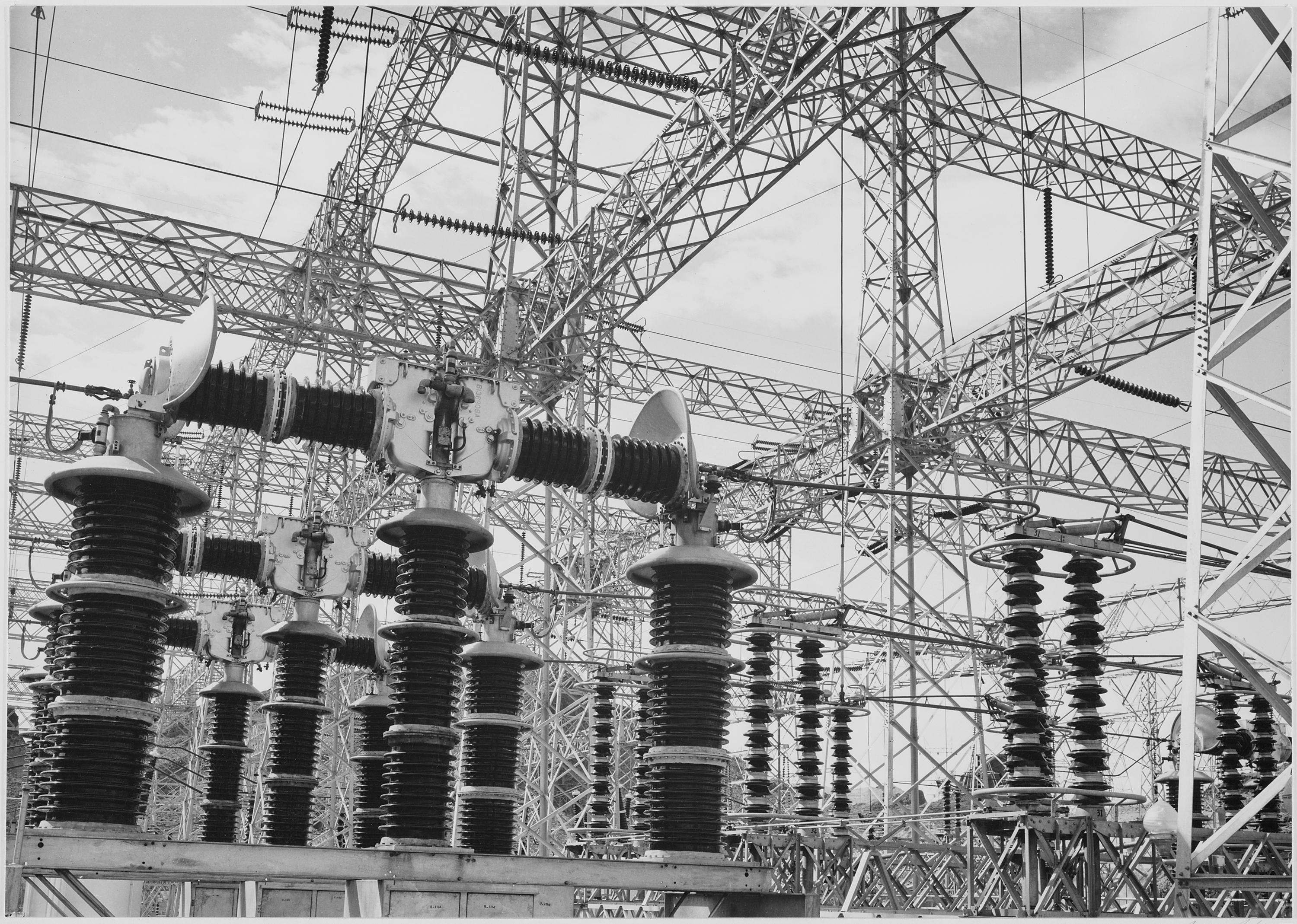

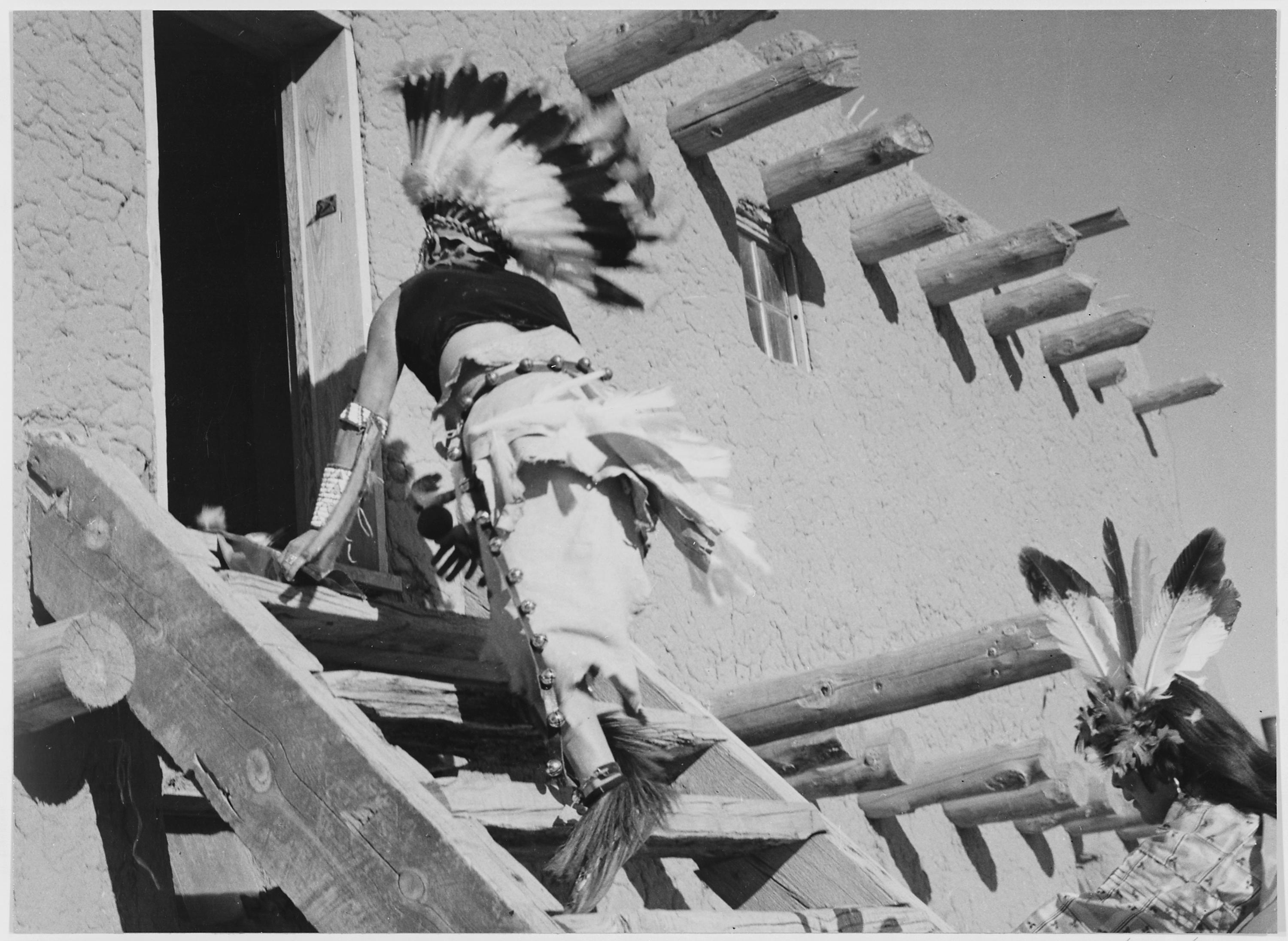

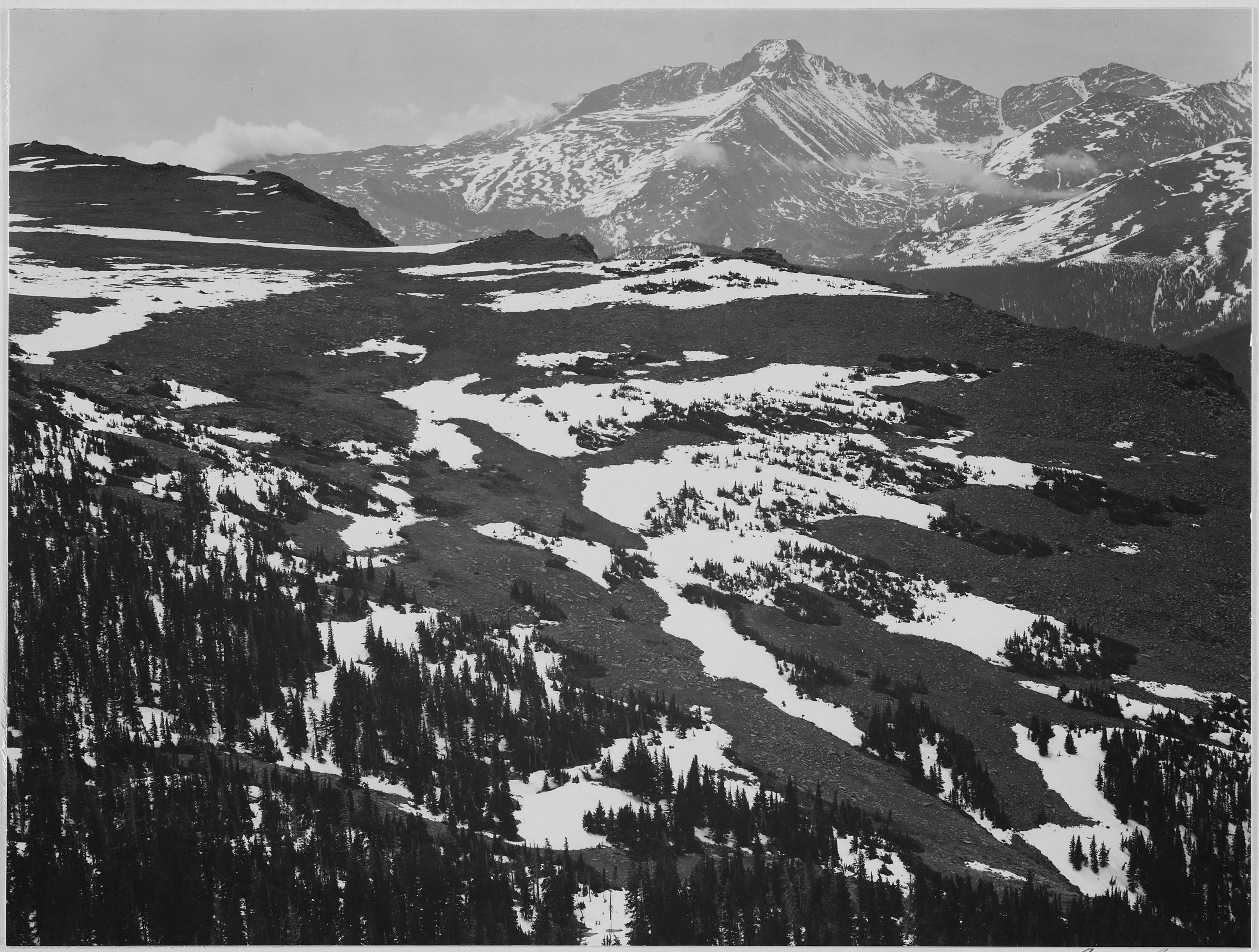

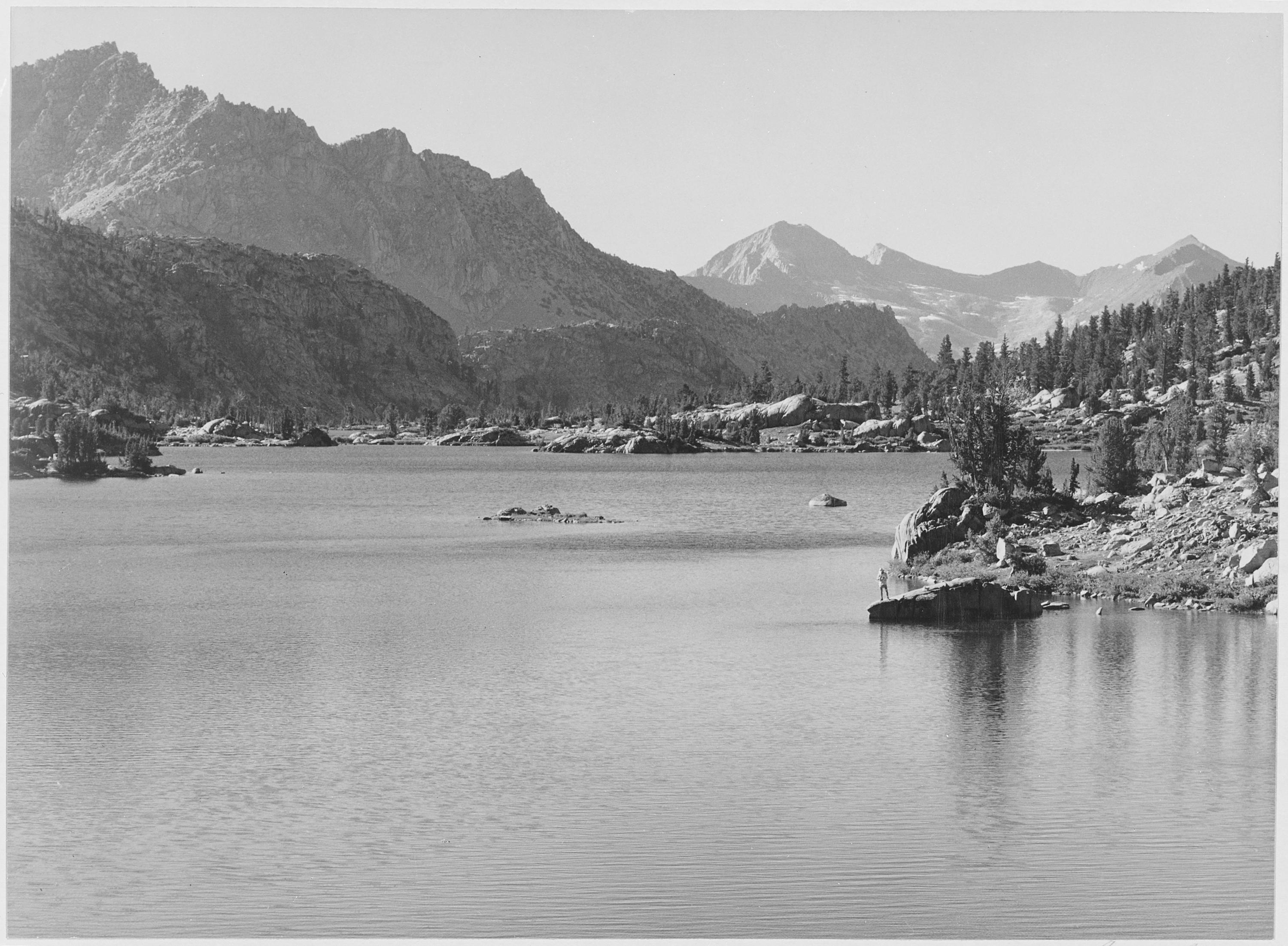

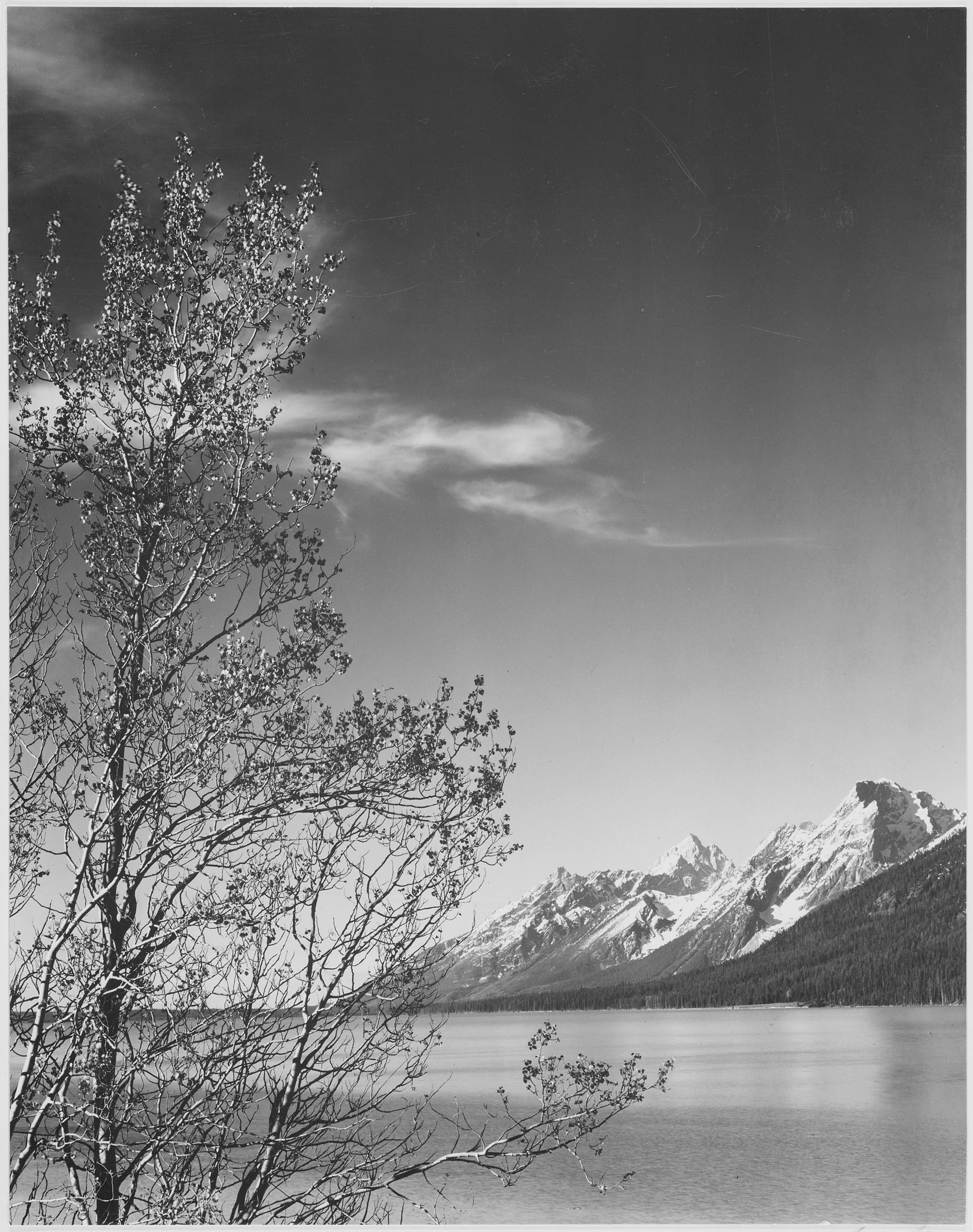

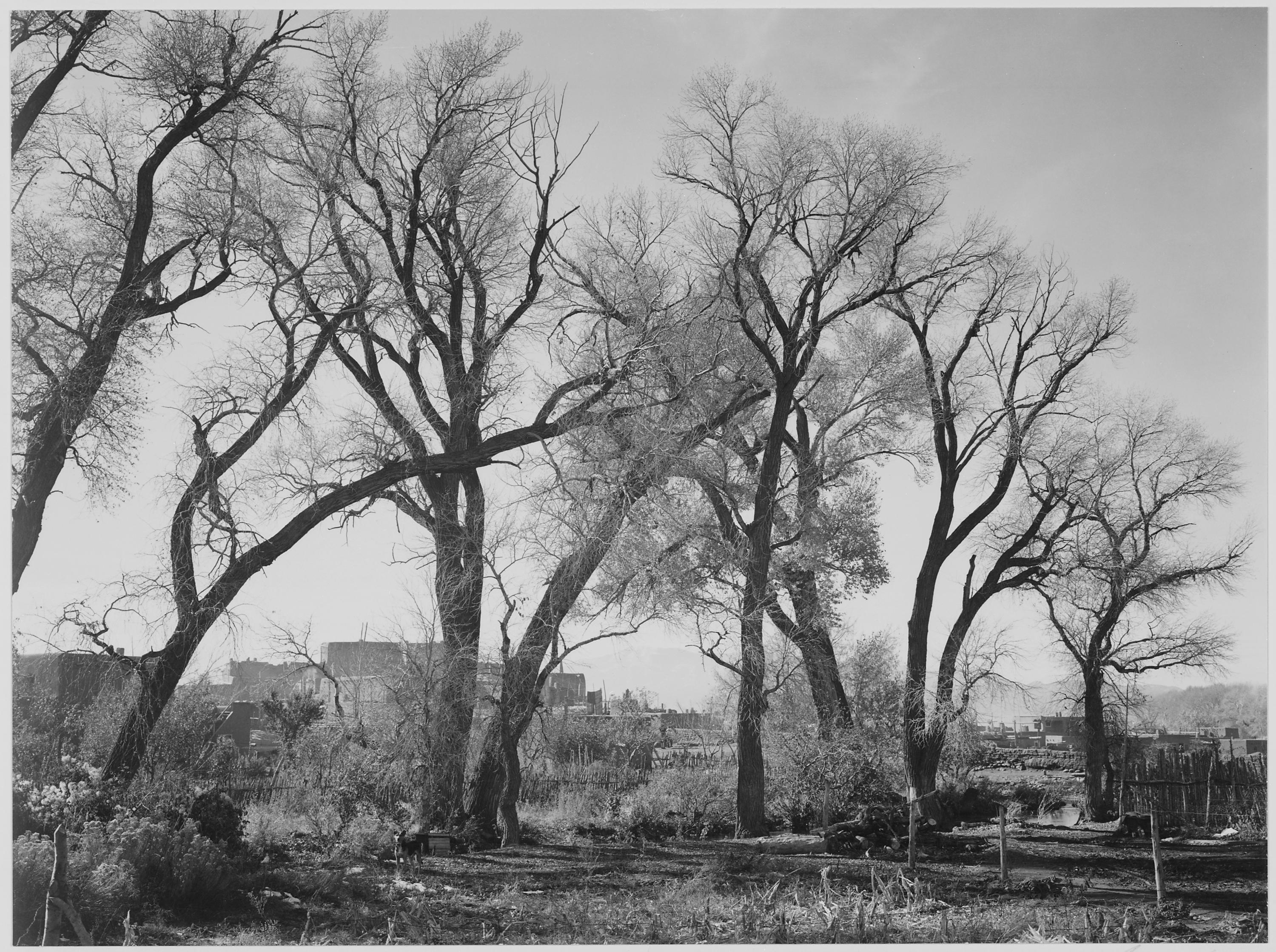

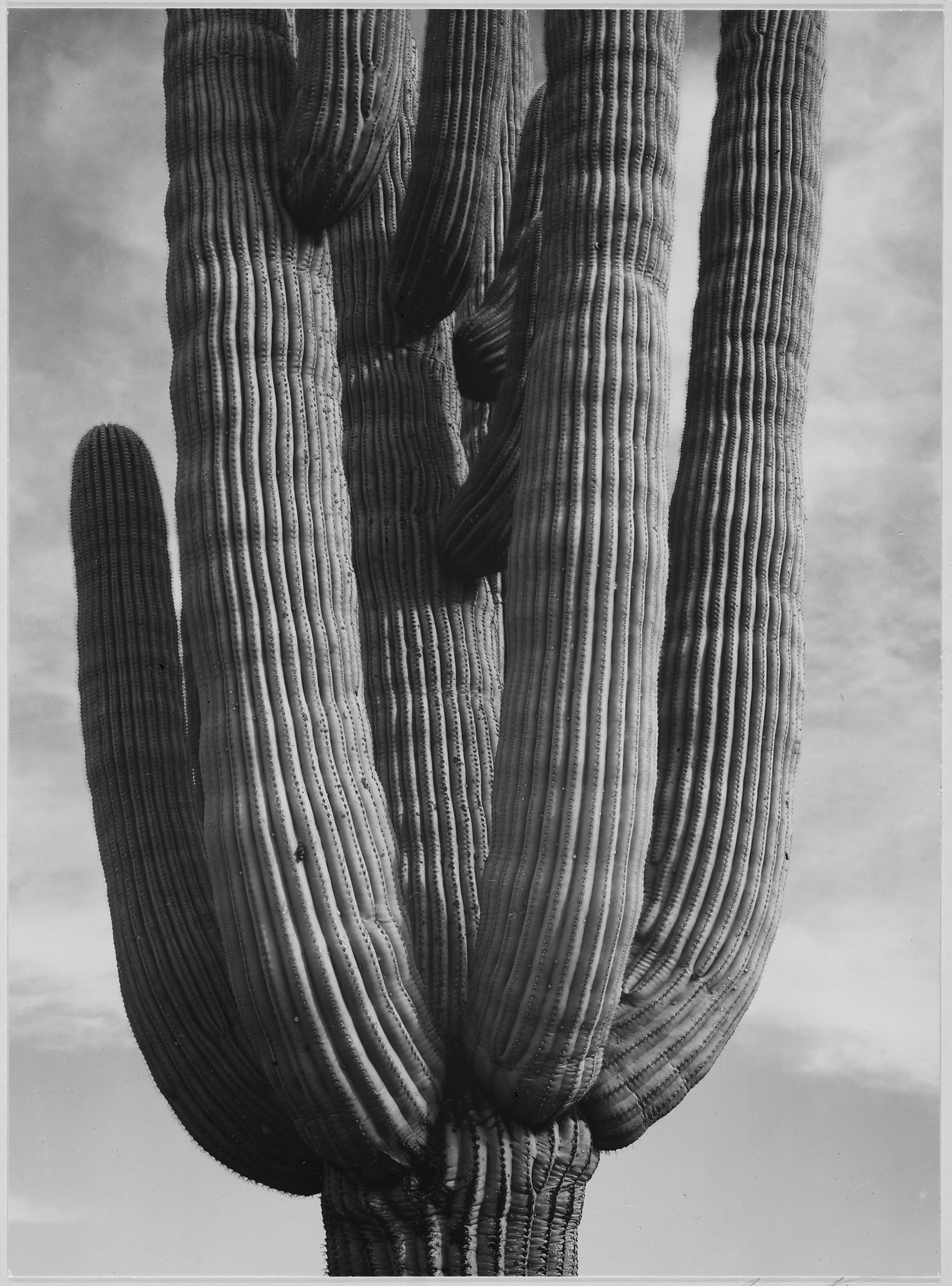

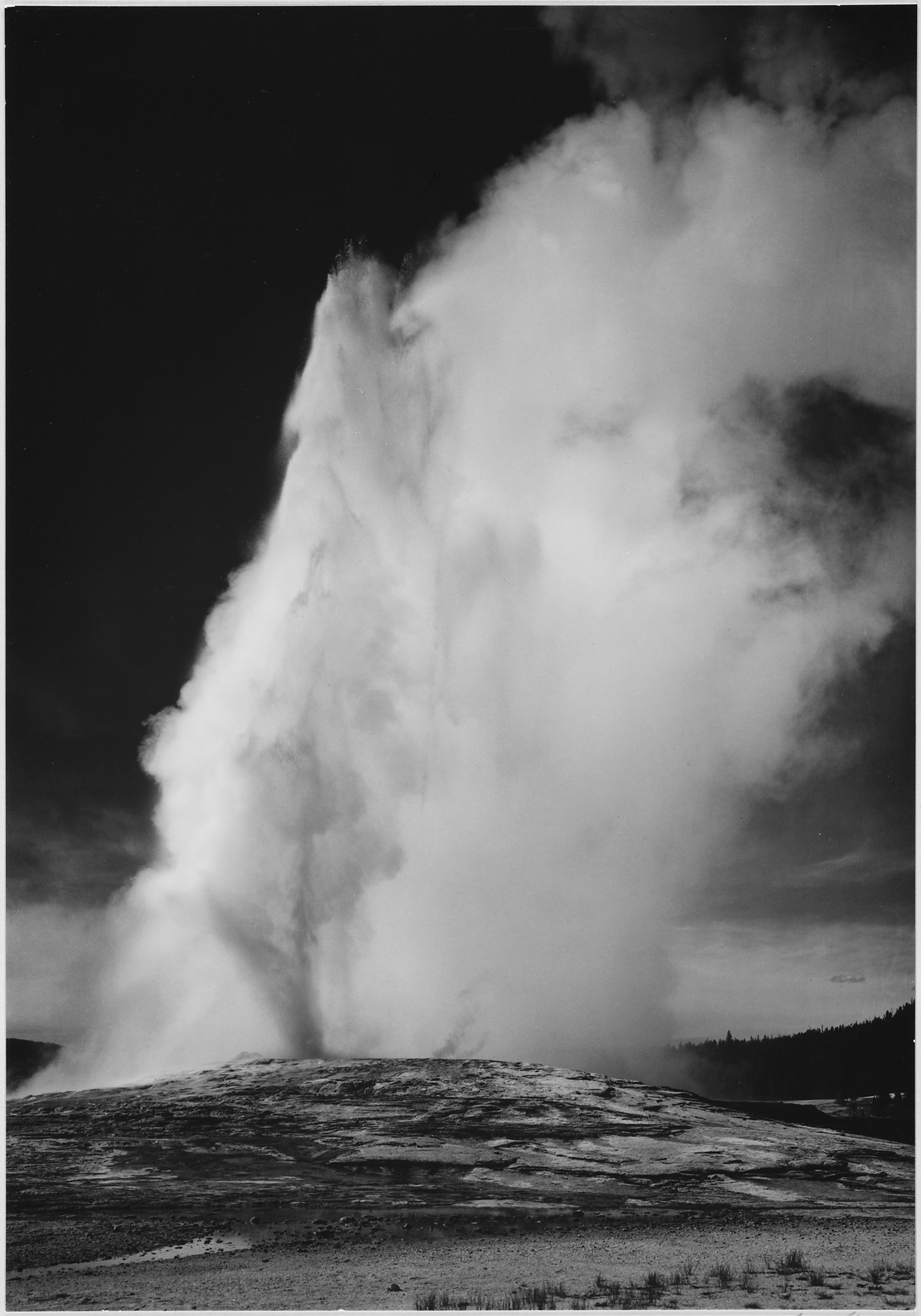

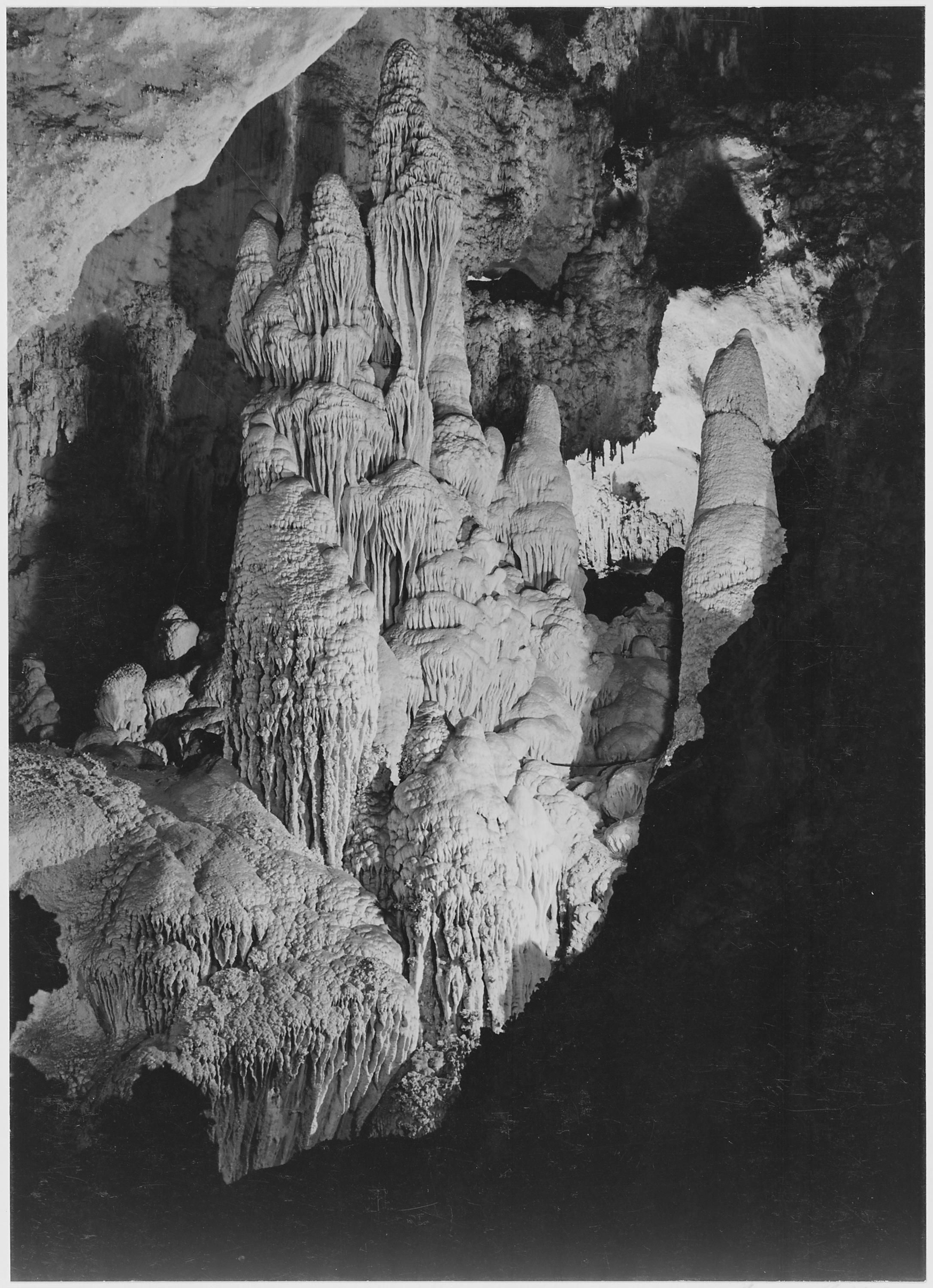

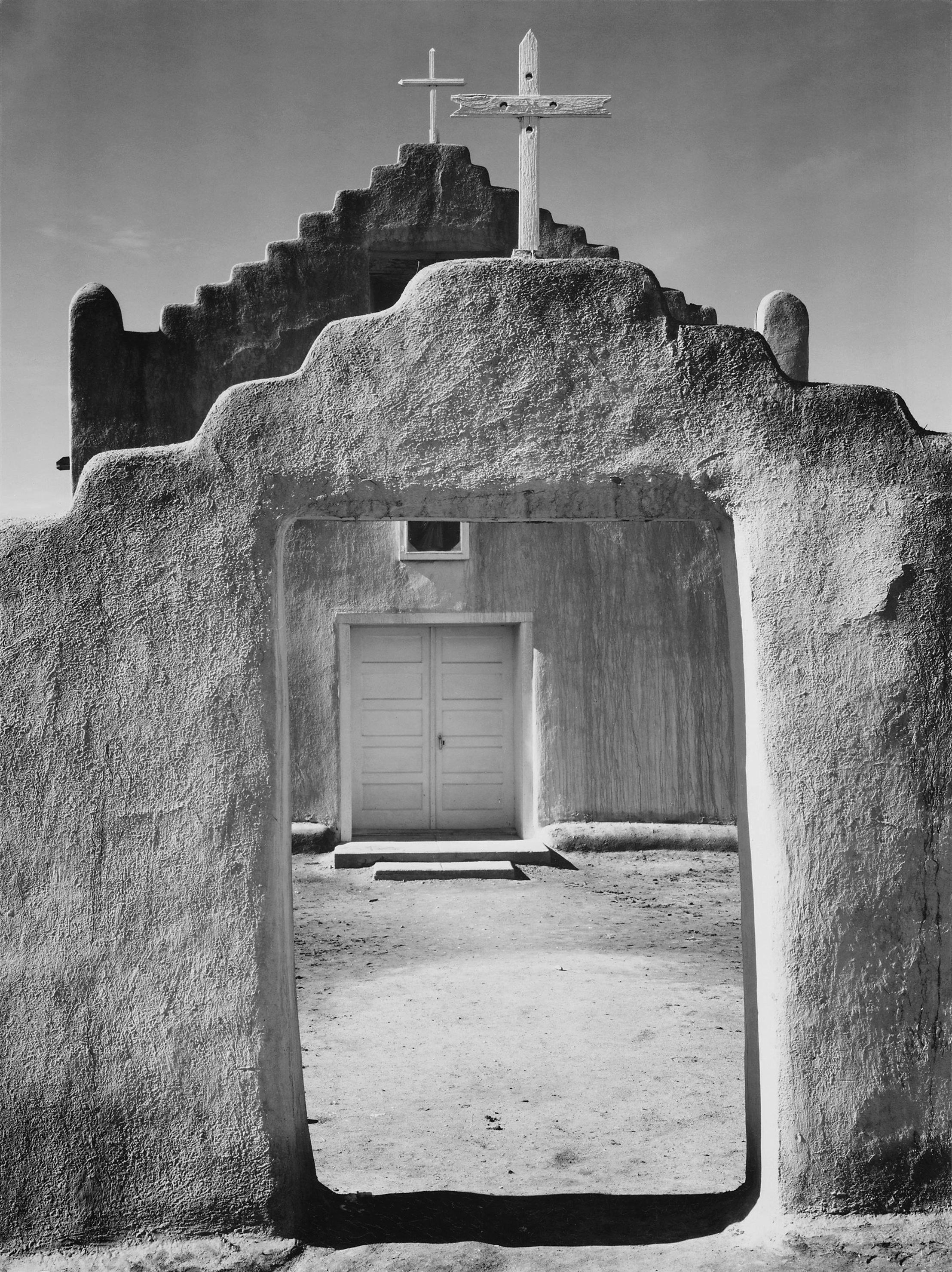

==== Moonrise ====
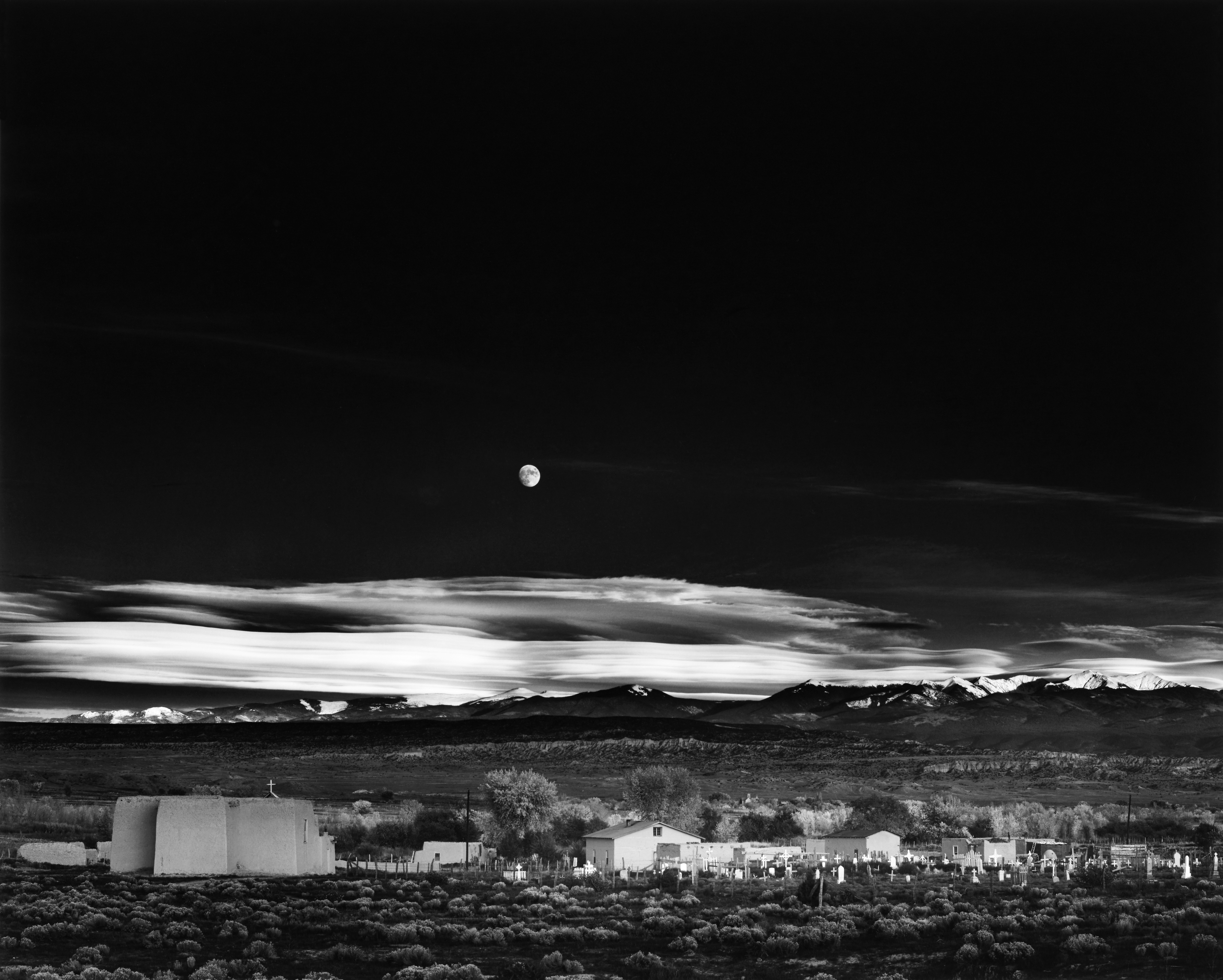
Moonrise, Hernandez, New Mexico (1941)

While in New Mexico for the project, Adams photographed a scene of the Moon rising above a modest village with snow-covered mountains in the background, under a dominating black sky. The photograph is one of his most famous and is named Moonrise, Hernandez, New Mexico. Adams's description in his later books of how it was made probably enhanced the photograph's fame: the light on the crosses in the foreground was rapidly fading, and he could not find his exposure meter; however, he remembered the luminance of the Moon and used it to calculate the proper exposure. (Note: Adams's first account in U.S. Camera 1943 annual was less dramatic, saying simply that the photograph was made after sunset, with exposure determined using his Weston Master meter, though Alinder 1996, p. 192, states that the image caption for Moonrise in U.S. Camera 1943 was inaccurate, citing several discrepancies among technical details.) In the resulting negative the foreground was underexposed, the highlights in the clouds were quite dense, and the negative proved difficult to print. The initial publication of Moonrise was in U.S. Camera 1943 annual, after being selected by the "photo judge" for U.S. Camera, Edward Steichen. This gave Moonrise an audience before its first formal exhibition at the Museum of Modern Art in 1944.

Over nearly 40 years, Adams re-interpreted the image, his most popular by far, using the latest darkroom equipment at his disposal, making over 1,369 unique prints, mostly in 16" by 20" format. Many of the prints were made during the 1970s, with their sale finally giving Adams financial independence from commercial projects. The total value of these original prints exceeds $25,000,000; the highest price paid for a single print of Moonrise reached $609,600 at a 2006 Sotheby's auction in New York.

The Mural Project ended on June 30, 1942; and because of the World War, the murals were never created. Adams sent a total of 225 small prints to the DOI, but held on to the 229 negatives. These include many famous images such as The Tetons and the Snake River. Although they were legally the property of the U.S. Government, he knew that the National Archives did not take proper care of photographic material, and used various subterfuges to evade queries.

The ownership of one image in particular has attracted interest: Moonrise. Although Adams kept meticulous records of his travel and expenses, he was less disciplined about recording the dates of his images, and he neglected to note the date of Moonrise. But the position of the Moon allowed the image to be eventually dated from astronomical calculations, and in 1991 Dennis di Cicco of Sky & Telescope determined that Moonrise was made on November 1, 1941. (Note: David Elmore of the High Altitude Observatory in Boulder, Colorado, had determined that Moonrise was taken on October 31, 1941, at 4:03 pm. Di Cicco noticed that the Moon's position at the time Elmore made his determination did not match the Moon's position in the image, and after an independent analysis, determined the time to be 4:49:20 pm on November 1, 1941. He reviewed his results with Elmore, who agreed with di Cicco's conclusions.) Since this was a day for which he had not billed the department, the image belonged to Adams.

==== World War II ====
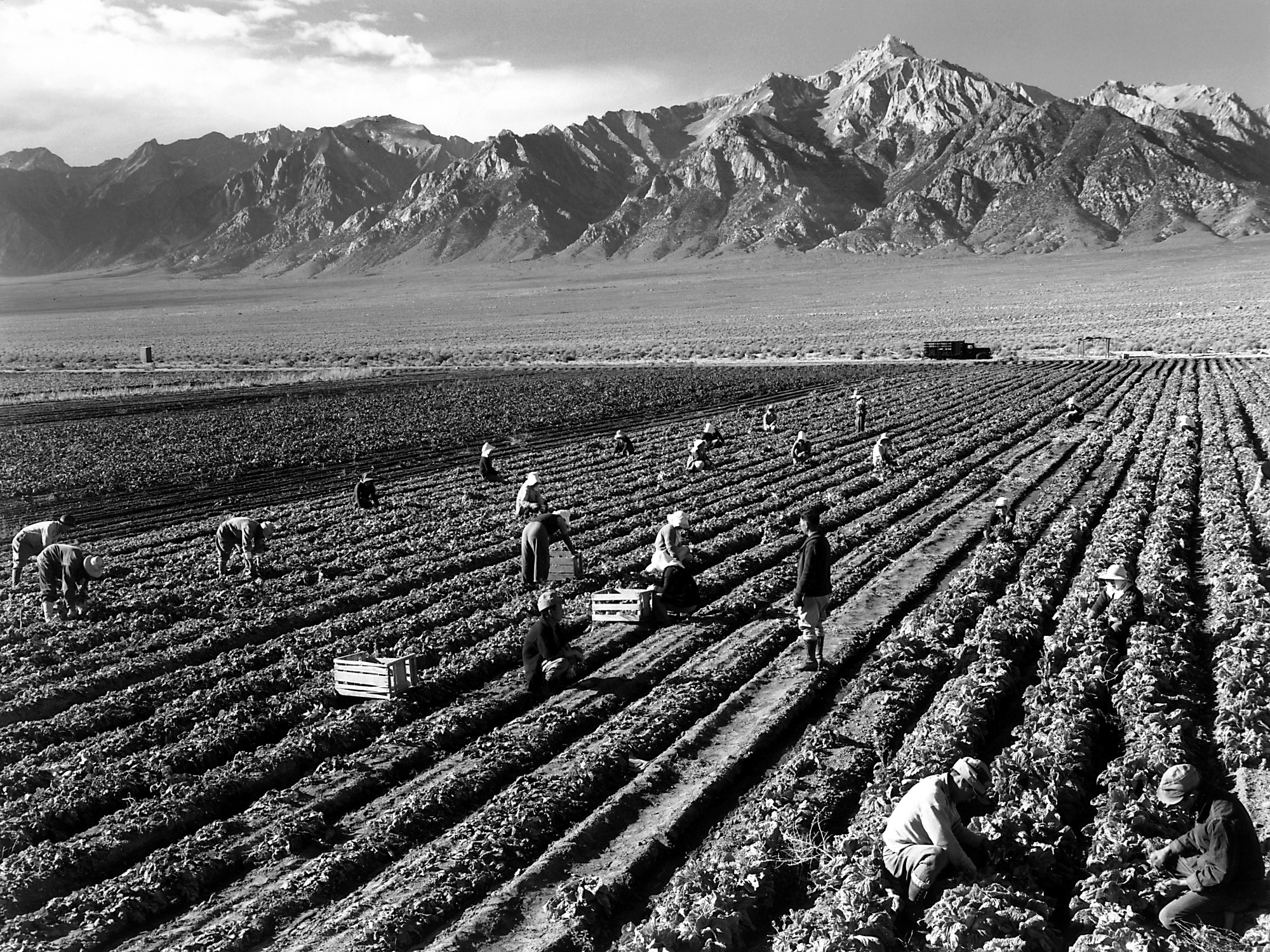
Farm, farm workers, Mt. Williamson in background, Manzanar Relocation Center, California (1943)

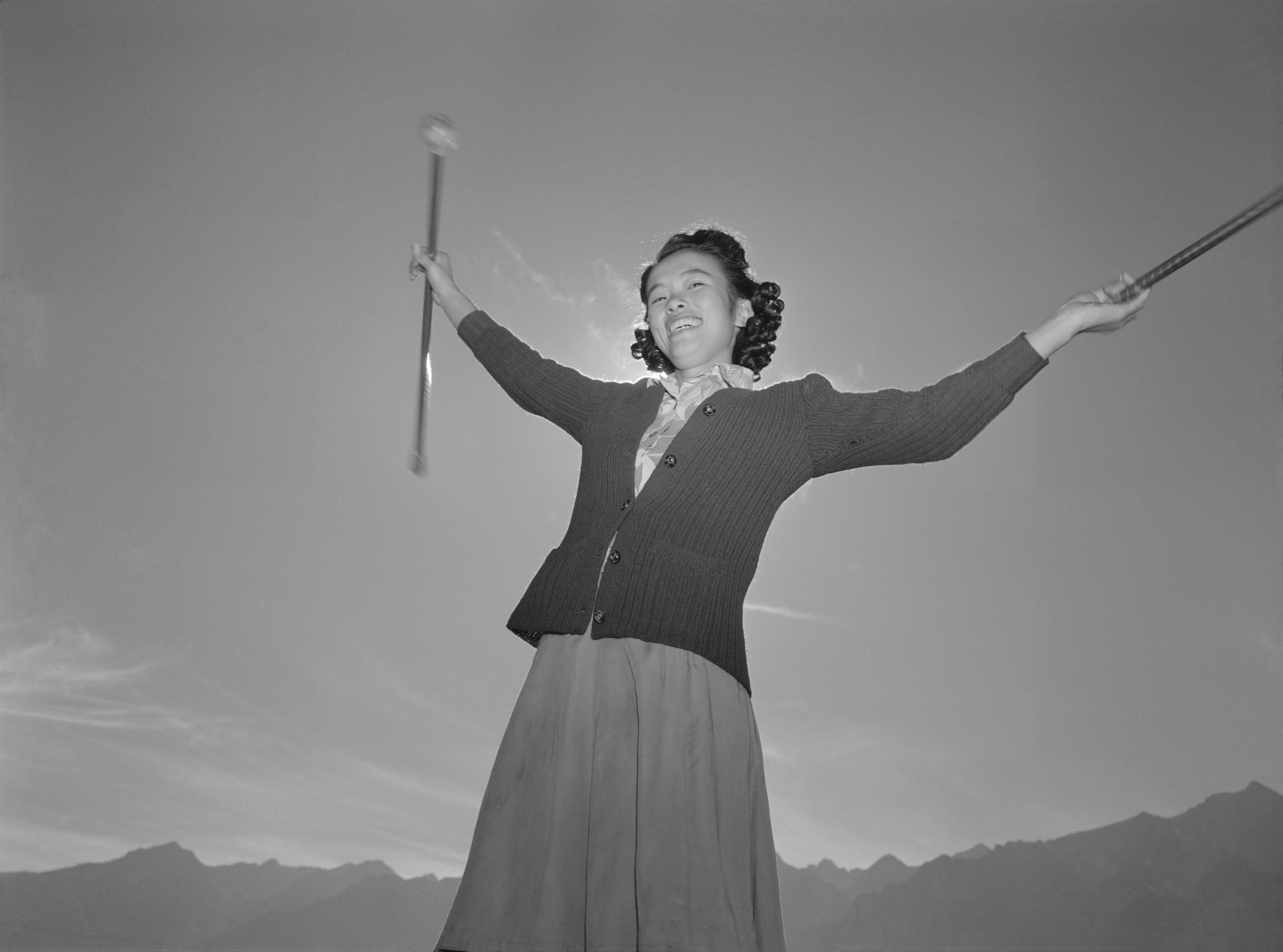
Baton practice, Florence Kuwata, Manzanar Relocation Center (1943)

When Edward Steichen formed his Naval Aviation Photographic Unit in early 1942, he wanted Adams to be a member, to build and direct a state-of-the-art darkroom and laboratory in Washington, D.C. Around February 1942, Steichen asked Adams to join him in the navy. Adams agreed, but with two conditions: He wanted to be commissioned as an officer, and he would not be available until July 1. Steichen, who wanted the team assembled as quickly as possible, passed on Adams and had his other photographers ready by early April.

Adams was distressed by the Japanese American internment that occurred after the Pearl Harbor attack. He requested permission to visit the Manzanar War Relocation Center in the Owens Valley, at the base of Mount Williamson. The resulting photo-essay first appeared in a Museum of Modern Art exhibit, and later was published as Born Free and Equal: The Story of Loyal Japanese-Americans. Upon its release, "[the book] was met with some distressing resistance and was rejected by many as disloyal." This work was a significant departure, stylistically and philosophically, from the work for which Adams is generally known. He also contributed to the war effort by doing many photographic assignments for the military, including making prints of secret Japanese installations in the Aleutians.

In 1943, Adams had a camera platform mounted on his station wagon, to afford him a better vantage point over the immediate foreground and a better angle for expansive backgrounds. Most of his landscapes from that time forward were made from the roof of his car rather than from summits reached by rugged hiking, as in his earlier days.

Adams was the recipient of three Guggenheim Fellowships during his career, the first being awarded in 1946 to photograph every national park. At that time, there were 28 national parks, and Adams photographed 27 of them, missing only Everglades National Park in Florida. This series of photographs produced memorable images of Old Faithful Geyser, Grand Teton, and Mount McKinley.

In 1945, Adams was asked to form the first fine art photography department at the California School of Fine Arts. Adams invited Dorothea Lange, Imogen Cunningham, and Edward Weston to be guest lecturers, and Minor White to be the principal instructor. The photography department produced numerous notable photographers, including Philip Hyde, Benjamen Chinn, and Bill Heick.

=== 1950s ===
In 1952 Adams was one of the founders of the magazine Aperture, which was intended as a serious journal of photography, displaying its best practitioners and newest innovations. He was also a contributor to Arizona Highways, a photo-rich travel magazine. His article on Mission San Xavier del Bac, with text by longtime friend Nancy Newhall, was enlarged into a book published in 1954. This was the first of many collaborations with her.

In June 1955, Adams began his annual workshops at Yosemite. They continued to 1981, attracting thousands of students. He continued with commercial assignments for another twenty years, and became a consultant, with a monthly retainer, for Polaroid Corporation, which was founded by good friend Edwin Land. He made thousands of photographs with Polaroid products, El Capitan, Winter, Sunrise (1968) being the one he considered most memorable. During the final twenty years of his life, the 6x6 cm medium format Hasselblad was his camera of choice, with Moon and Half Dome (1960) being his favorite photograph made with that brand of camera.

From 1957 until 1962, Geraldine "Gerry" Sharpe served as his photography assistant, and they often took photos of the same locations.

Adams published his fourth portfolio, What Majestic Word, in 1963, and dedicated it to the memory of his Sierra Club friend Russell Varian, who was a co-inventor of the klystron and who had died in 1959. The title was taken from the poem "Sand Dunes", by John Varian, Russell's father, and the fifteen photographs were accompanied by the writings of both John and Russell Varian. Russell's widow, Dorothy, wrote the preface, and explained that the photographs were selected to serve as interpretations of the character of Russell Varian.

== Later career ==
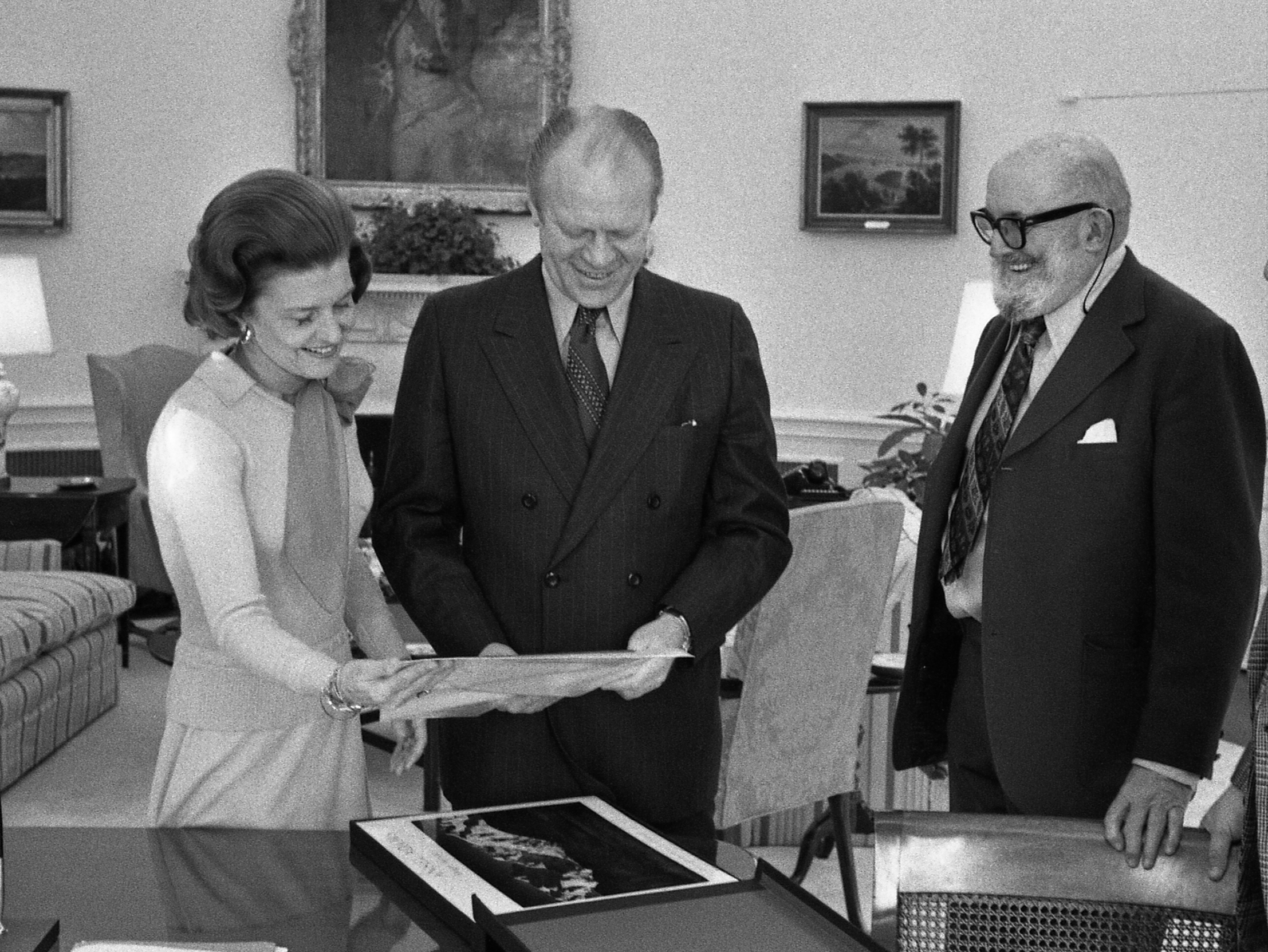
President Gerald Ford and First Lady Betty Ford viewing photographs with Adams, 1975

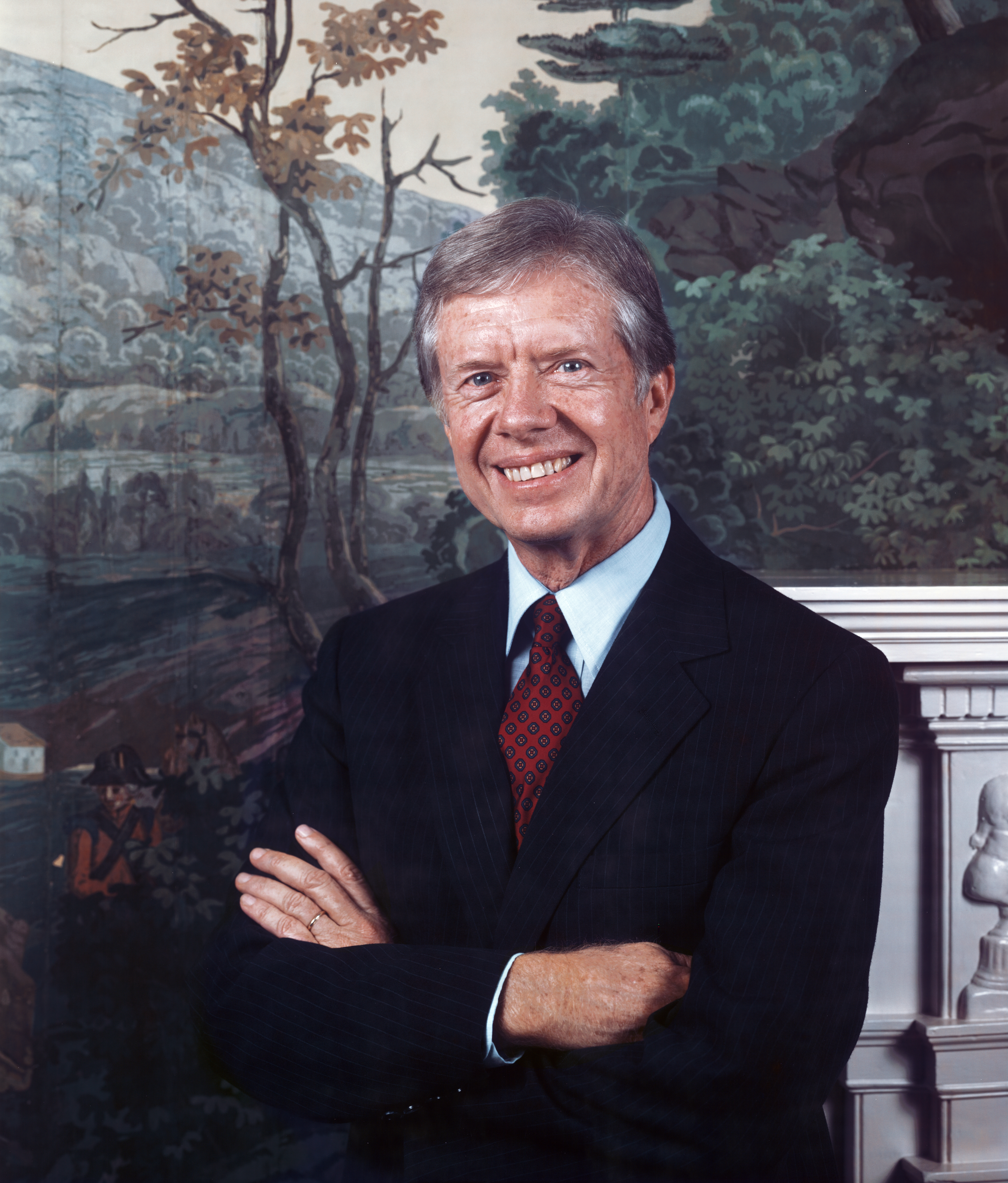
Jimmy Carter by Adams.

By the 1960s, Adams had developed gout and arthritis and hoped that moving to a new home would make him feel better. He and his wife considered Santa Fe, but they both had commitments in California (Virginia was managing the Yosemite studio of her father). A friend offered to sell them property in Carmel Highlands, overlooking the Big Sur coastline. With architect Eldridge Spencer, they began planning the new home in 1961 and moved there in 1965. Adams began to devote much of his time to printing the backlog of negatives that had accumulated over forty years.

In the 1960s, a few mainstream art galleries that had considered photography unworthy of exhibit alongside fine paintings decided to show Adams's images, particularly the former Kenmore Gallery in Philadelphia. In March 1963, Ansel Adams and Nancy Newhall accepted a commission from Clark Kerr, the president of the University of California, to produce a series of photographs of the university's campuses to commemorate its centennial celebration. The collection, titled Fiat Lux after the university's motto, was published in 1967 and now resides in the Museum of Photography at the University of California, Riverside. The collection was republished in book form by UCI in 1991, recreated in part by UCLA-based photographer Kevin Cooley in 2014, and exhibited in part at UCR in 2025.

Adams was the recipient of three Guggenheim Fellowships during his career, the first being awarded in 1946 to photograph every national park. At that time, there were 28 national parks, and Adams photographed 27 of them, missing only Everglades National Park in Florida. This series of photographs produced memorable images of Old Faithful Geyser, Grand Teton, and Mount McKinley. Beyond the western national parks, Adams also extensively photographed the New England coast from Connecticut to Maine, the only coastal location outside of California that he photographed steadily over decades. His 1949 photograph "The Atlantic, Schoodic Point, Acadia National Park, Maine" became part of his Portfolio Two: The National Parks and Monuments.

During the 1970s, Adams reprinted negatives from his vault, in part to satisfy the demand of art museums that had recently established departments of photography.

In 1972, Adams contributed images to help publicize Proposition 20, which authorized the state to regulate development along portions of the California coast.

In 1974, he exhibited at the Rencontres d'Arles (formerly known as the Rencontres Internationales de la Photographie d'Arles), an annual summer photography festival in France. He also had a major retrospective exhibition at the Metropolitan Museum of Art.

In 1975, he cofounded the Center for Creative Photography at the University of Arizona, which handles some of his estate matters.

In 1979, President Jimmy Carter commissioned Adams to make the first official photographic portrait of a U.S. president. During this occasion, Adams gave Carter a letter containing two memoranda. One advocated placing Big Sur under federal protection. The other argued for stronger legislation for protecting Alaskan wilderness.

=== Death and legacy ===
Adams died from cardiovascular disease on April 22, 1984, in the intensive-care unit at the Community Hospital of the Monterey Peninsula in Monterey, California, at age 82. He was surrounded by his wife, two children and five grandchildren. His body was cremated and his ashes were scattered on Half Dome at Yosemite National Park.

Publishing rights for most of Adams's photographs are handled by the trustees of The Ansel Adams Publishing Rights Trust. An archive of Adams's work is located at the Center for Creative Photography at the University of Arizona in Tucson. Numerous works by the artist have been sold at auction, including a mural-sized print of Clearing Winter Storm, Yosemite National Park, which sold at Sotheby's New York in June 2010 for $722,500, then the highest price ever paid for an original Ansel Adams photograph. This price was surpassed by another mural-sized print of one of his photographs, The Tetons and the Snake River, sold for $988,000 at Sotheby's New York, on December 14, 2020.

John Szarkowski states in the introduction to Ansel Adams: Classic Images (1985, p. 5), "The love that Americans poured out for the work and person of Ansel Adams during his old age, and that they have continued to express with undiminished enthusiasm since his death, is an extraordinary phenomenon, perhaps even unparalleled in our country's response to a visual artist."

Adams's wife, Virginia Rose Best, died on January 29, 2000, aged 96.

== Contributions and influence ==
=== Landscapes of the American West ===
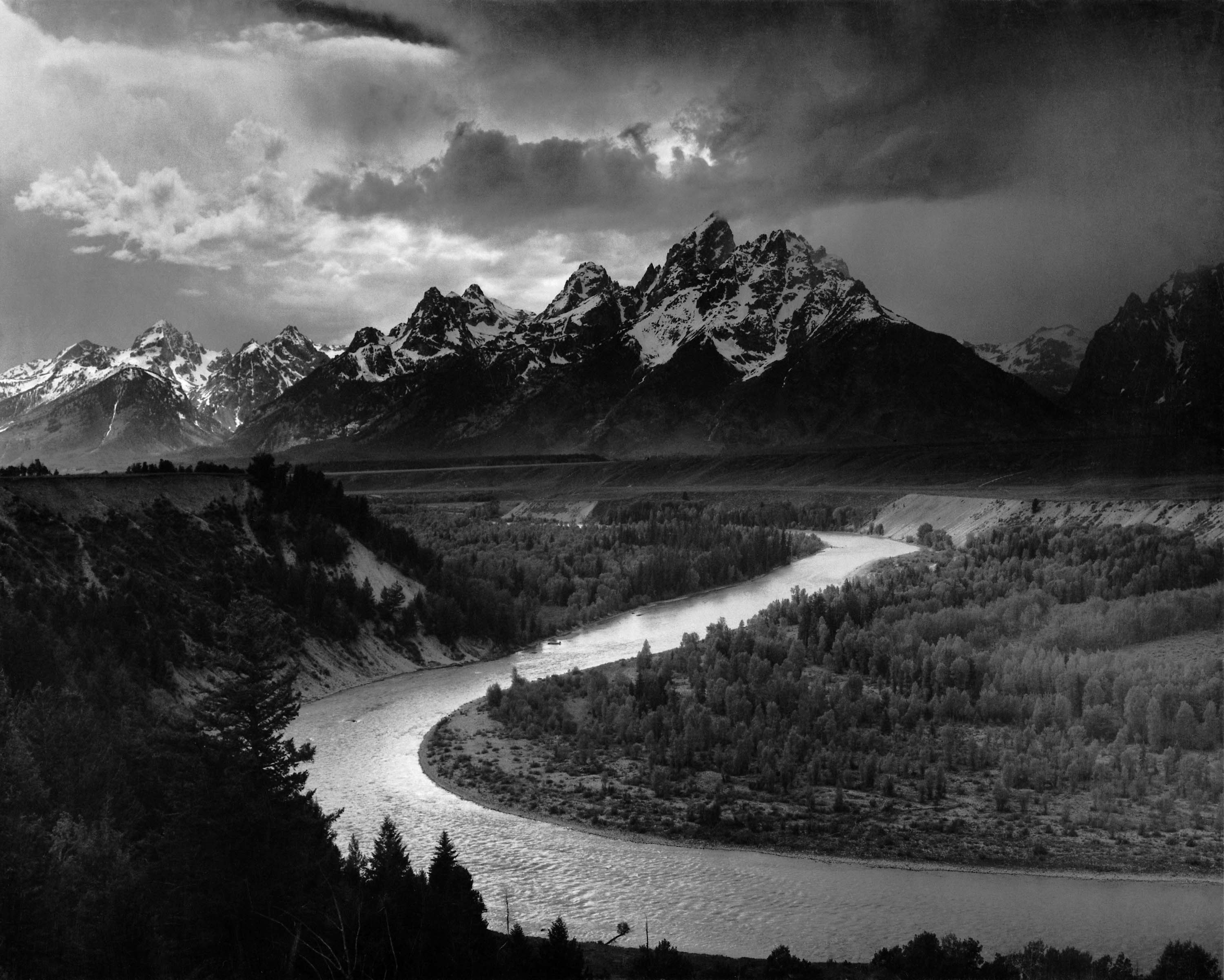
The Tetons and the Snake River (1942)

Romantic landscape artists Albert Bierstadt and Thomas Moran portrayed the Grand Canyon and Yosemite during the 19th century, followed by photographers Carleton Watkins, Eadweard Muybridge, and George Fiske. Adams's work is distinguished from theirs by his interest in the transient and ephemeral. He photographed at varying times of the day and of the year, capturing the landscape's changing light and atmosphere.

Art critic John Szarkowski wrote, "Ansel Adams attuned himself more precisely than any photographer before him to a visual understanding of the specific quality of the light that fell on a specific place at a specific moment. For Adams the natural landscape is not a fixed and solid sculpture but an insubstantial image, as transient as the light that continually redefines it. This sensibility to the specificity of light was the motive that forced Adams to develop his legendary photographic technique."

The creation of Adams's grand, highly detailed images was driven by his interest in the natural environment. With increasing environmental degradation in the West during the 20th century, his photos show a commitment to conservation. His black-and-white photographs were not just documentation, but reflected a sublime experience of nature as a spiritual place.

In 1955, Edward Steichen selected Adams's Mount Williamson for the world-touring Museum of Modern Art exhibition The Family of Man, which was seen by nine million visitors. At 10 by 12 feet (3.0 by 3.7 m), his was the largest print in the exhibition, presented floor-to-ceiling in a prominent position as the backdrop to the section "Relationships", as a reminder of the essential reliance of humanity on the soil. However, despite its striking and prominent display, Adams expressed displeasure at the "gross" enlargement and "poor" quality of the print.

=== Group f/64 ===
In 1932, Adams helped form the anti-pictorialist Group f/64, a loose and relatively short-lived association of like-minded "straight" or "pure" photographers on the West Coast whose members included Edward Weston and Imogen Cunningham. The modernist group favored sharp focus—f/64 being a very small aperture setting that gives great depth of field on large-format view cameras—contact printing, precisely exposed images of natural forms and found objects, and the use of the entire tonal range of a photograph.

Adams wrote the group's manifesto for their exhibition at the De Young Museum:

Group f/64 limits its members and invitational names to those workers who are striving to define photography as an art-form by a simple and direct presentation through purely photographic methods. The Group will show no work at any time that does not conform to its standards of pure photography. Pure photography is defined as possessing no qualities of [technique], composition or ideas, derivative of any other art-form. The production of the "Pictorialist," on the other hand, indicates a devotion to principles of art, which are directly related to painting and the graphic arts. The members of Group f/64 believe that Photography, as an art-form, must develop along lines defined by the actualities and limitations of the photographic medium, and must always remain independent of ideological conventions of art and aesthetics that are reminiscent of a period of culture antedating the growth of the medium itself.

The f/64 school met with opposition from the pictorialists, particularly William Mortensen, who called their work "hard and brittle". Adams disliked the work of Mortensen and disliked him personally, referring to him as the "Anti-Christ". The purists were friends with prominent historians, and their influence led to the exclusion of Mortensen from histories of photography.

Adams later developed this purist approach into the Zone System.

=== The Zone System ===
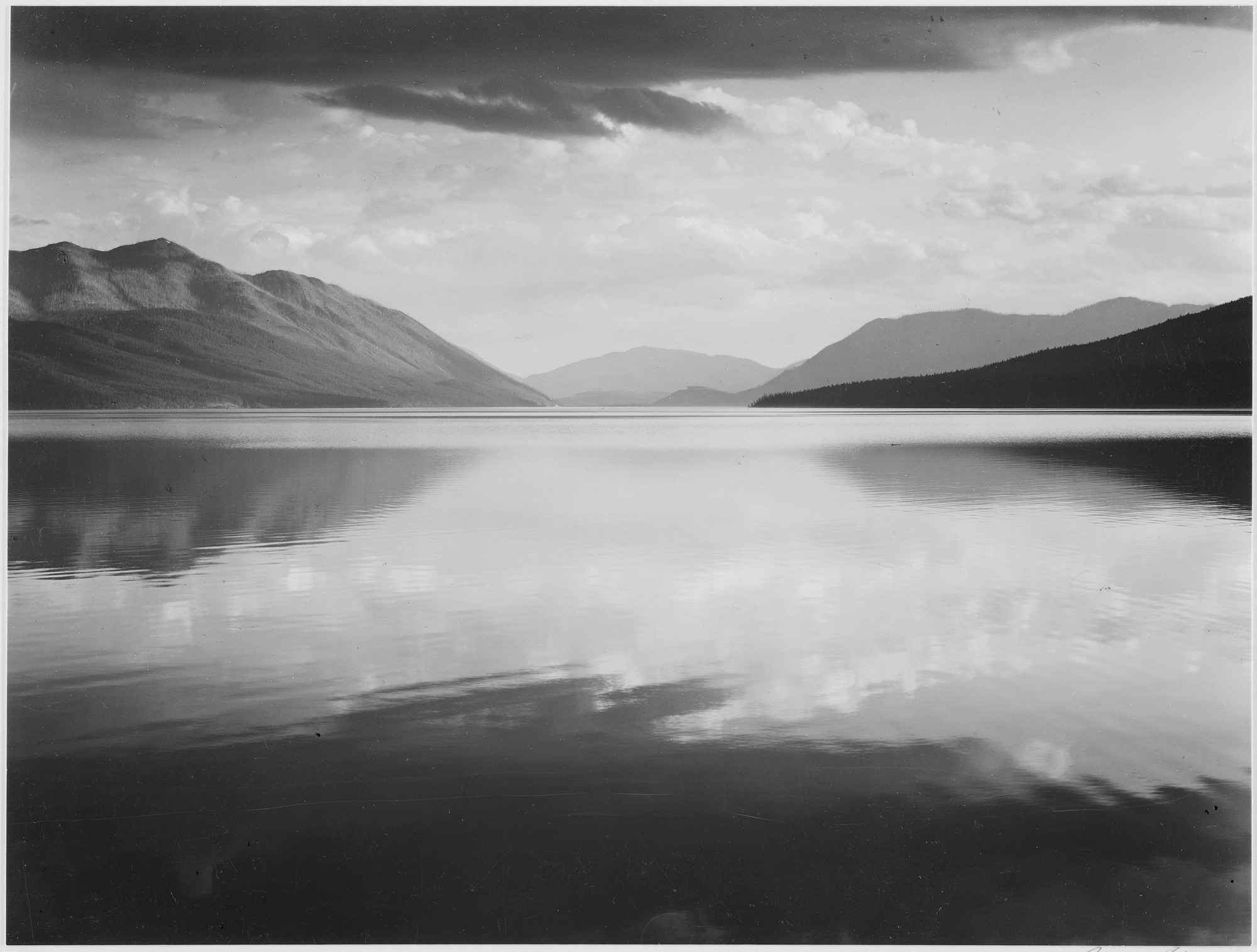
Evening, McDonald Lake, Glacier National Park (1942)

While Adams and portrait photographer Fred Archer were teaching at the Art Center School in Los Angeles, around 1939–1940, they developed the Zone System for managing the photographic process, which was based on sensitometry, the study of the light-sensitivity of photographic materials and the relationship between exposure time and the resulting density on a negative. The Zone System provides a calibrated scale of brightness, from Zone 0 (black) through shades of gray to Zone X (white). The photographer can take light readings of key elements in a scene and use the Zone System to determine how the film must be exposed, developed, and printed to achieve the desired brightness or darkness in the final image. Although it originated for black-and-white sheet film, the Zone System can be applied to images captured on roll film, both black-and-white and color, negative and reversal, and to digital photography.

=== Photography department at the Museum of Modern Art ===
In 1940, with trustee David H. McAlpin and curator Beaumont Newhall, Adams helped establish the photography department at the Museum of Modern Art (MoMA) in New York. MoMA was the first major American art museum to establish a photography department. Adams acted as McAlpin and Newhall's primary advisor; Peter Galassi, the chief curator of the department in later years, said "Adams's dedication and boundless energy were vital to the creation of the department and to its programs in its early years." For those who had sought institutional recognition for photography as art, the founding of the department was an important moment, marking the medium's recognition as a subject equal to painting and sculpture.

On December 31, 1940, the department opened its first exhibition, Sixty Photographs: A Survey of Camera Esthetics, which resembled large survey exhibitions that Adams and Newhall had previously mounted independently. The exhibition took aesthetic quality as a guiding principle, a philosophy that ran counter to that of many writers and critics, who argued that the medium's more vernacular use as a means of communication should be more fully represented. Photographer Ralph Steiner, writing for PM, remarked "on the whole it [MoMA] seems to regard photography as soft music at high tea rather than as a jazz at a beefsteak supper." Tom Maloney, publisher of U.S. Camera, wrote that the exhibition was "very choice, very pristine, very small, very ultra." According to Newhall, the exhibition was meant to showcase artistic excellence and "not to define but to suggest the possibilities of photographic vision."

=== Environmental protection ===
In his autobiography, Adams expressed his concern about Americans' loss of connection to nature in the course of industrialization and the exploitation of the land's natural resources. He stated, "We all know the tragedy of the dust bowls, the cruel unforgivable erosions of the soil, the depletion of fish or game, and the shrinking of the noble forests. And we know that such catastrophes shrivel the spirit of the people... The wilderness is pushed back, man is everywhere. Solitude, so vital to the individual man, is almost nowhere."

== Awards and honors ==
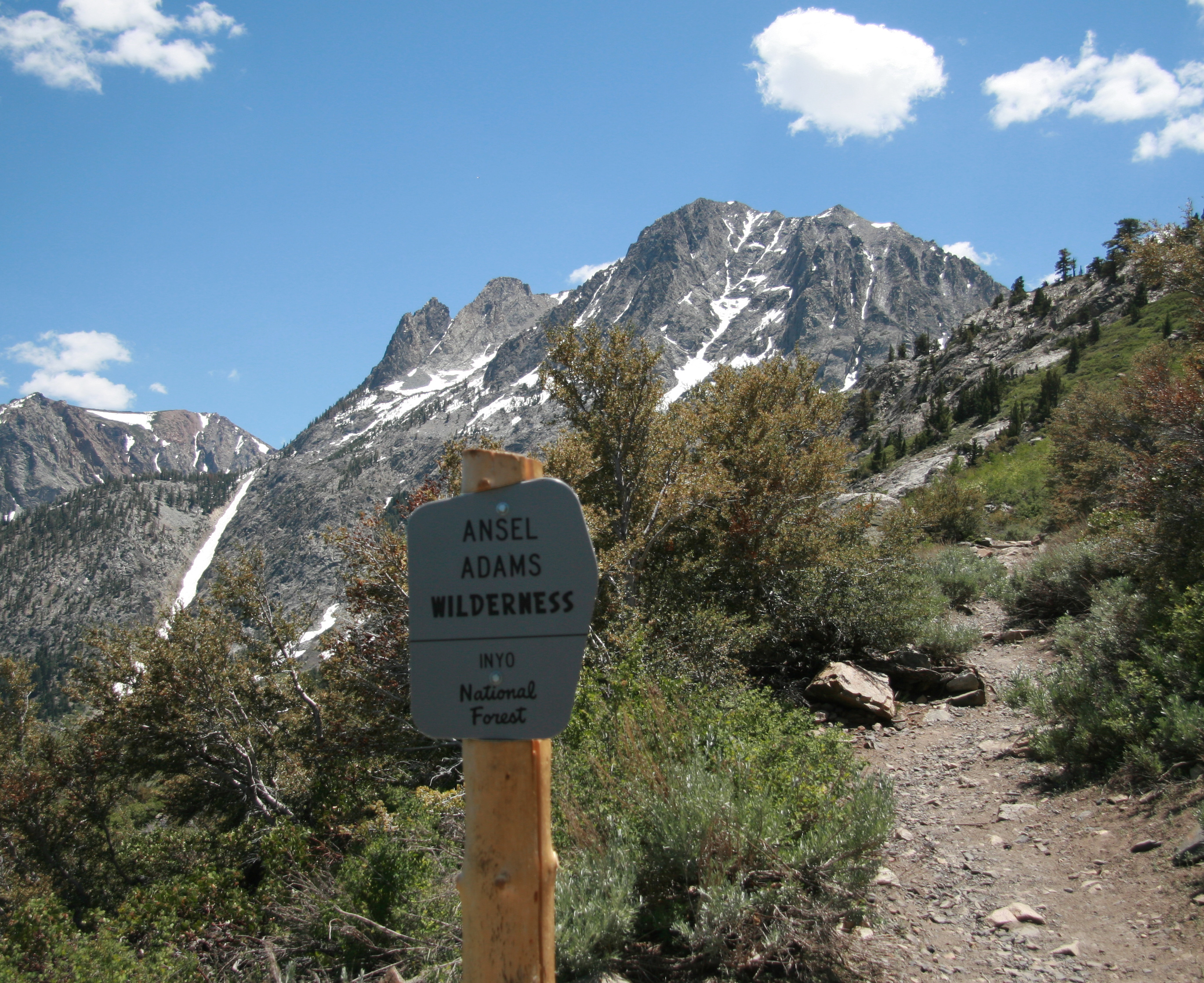
Ansel Adams Wilderness designated area

Adams received a number of awards during his lifetime and posthumously, and several awards and places have been named in his honor.

For his photography, Adams received an Honorary Fellowship of the Royal Photographic Society in 1976 and the Hasselblad Award in 1981. Two of his photographs, The Tetons and the Snake River and a view of the Golden Gate Bridge from Baker Beach, were among the 115 images recorded on the Voyager Golden Record aboard the Voyager spacecraft. These images were selected to convey information about humans, plants and animals, and geological features of the Earth to a possibly alien civilization.

For his conservation efforts, Adams received the Sierra Club John Muir Award in 1963. In 1968, he was awarded the Conservation Service Award, the highest award of the Department of the Interior. In 1980, President Jimmy Carter awarded him the Presidential Medal of Freedom, the nation's highest civilian honor, for "his efforts to preserve this country's wild and scenic areas, both on film and on earth. Drawn to the beauty of nature's monuments, he is regarded by environmentalists as a national institution."

Adams received an honorary artium doctor degree from Harvard University and an honorary Doctor of Fine Arts degree from Yale University. He was elected a Fellow of the American Academy of Arts and Sciences in 1966. In 2007, he was inducted into the California Hall of Fame by California Governor Arnold Schwarzenegger and First Lady Maria Shriver.

The Sierra Club's Ansel Adams Award for Conservation Photography was established in 1971, and the Ansel Adams Award for Conservation was established in 1980 by The Wilderness Society, which also has a large permanent gallery of his work on display at its Washington, D.C. headquarters. The Minarets Wilderness in the Inyo National Forest and a 11,760-foot (3,580 m) peak therein were renamed the Ansel Adams Wilderness and Mount Ansel Adams, respectively, in 1985.

In 1984 Adams was inducted into the International Photography Hall of Fame.

== Photographs ==
=== Color images ===
Adams was known mostly for his boldly printed, large-format black-and-white images, but he also worked extensively with color. However, he preferred black-and-white photography, which he believed could be manipulated to produce a wide range of bold, expressive tones, and felt constricted by the rigidity of the color process. Most of his color work was done on assignments, and he did not consider it to be important or expressive, even explicitly forbidding any posthumous exploitation of it.

=== Notable photographs ===
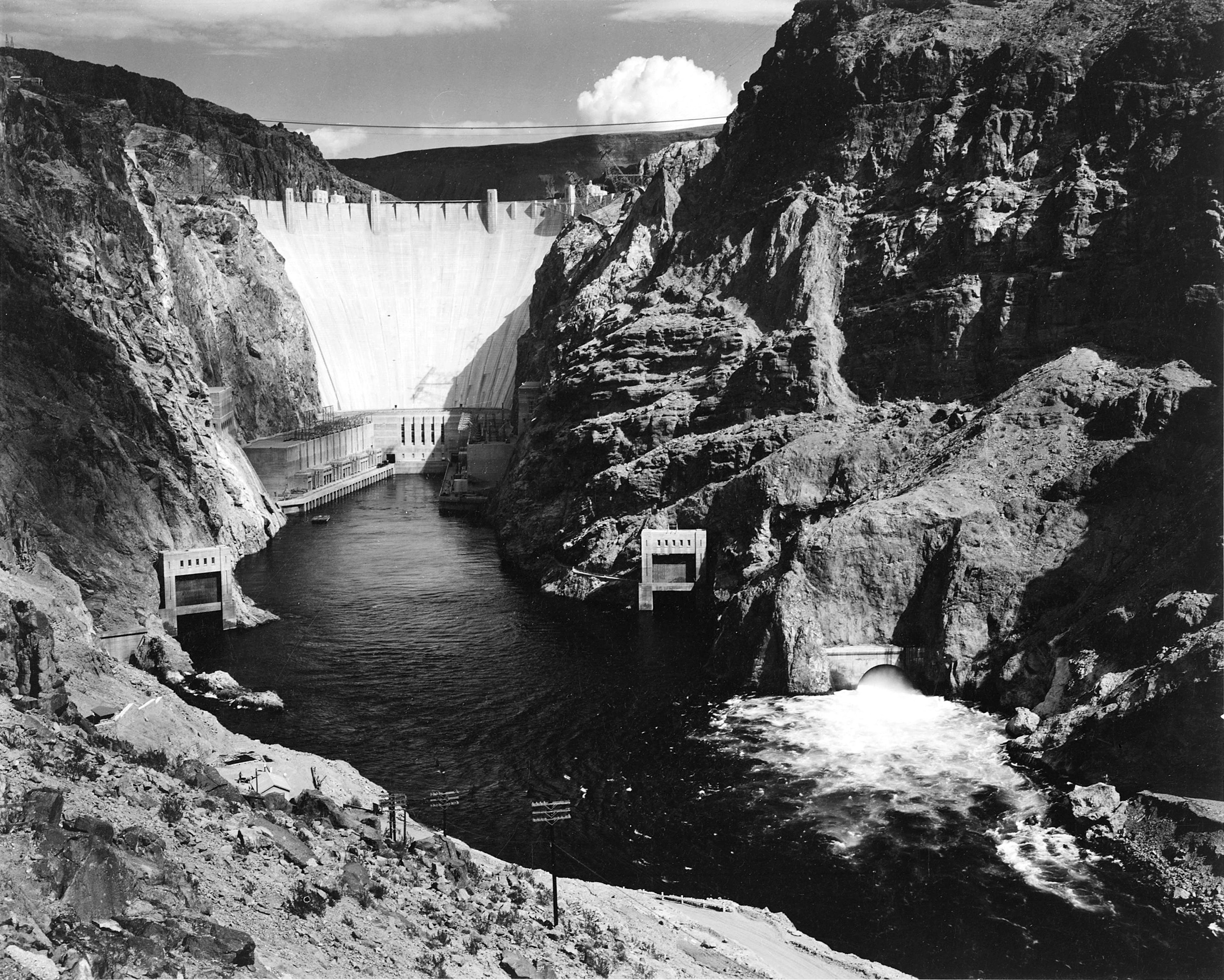
Hoover Dam in 1941

- Lodgepole Pines, Lyell Fork of the Merced River, Yosemite National Park, 1921
- Monolith, the Face of Half Dome, Yosemite National Park, 1927
- Rose and Driftwood, San Francisco, California, 1932
- Georgia O'Keeffe and Orville Cox, Canyon de Chelly National Monument, 1937
- Clearing Winter Storm, Yosemite National Park, c. 1937
- Half Dome, Merced River, Winter, 1938
- Moonrise, Hernandez, New Mexico, 1941
- Evening, McDonald Lake, Glacier National Park, 1942
- The Tetons and the Snake River, Grand Teton National Park, 1942
- Winter Sunrise, Sierra Nevada, from Lone Pine, California, 1944
- Mount Williamson, Sierra Nevada, from Manzanar, California, 1944
- Aspens, Northern New Mexico, New Mexico, 1958
- Moon and Half Dome, Yosemite National Park, California, 1960
- El Capitan, Winter Sunrise, 1968

=== Published works ===
- Adams, Ansel (1935). Making a Photograph: An Introduction to Photography. New York: The Studio Publications.
- Adams, Ansel (1948). Basic Photo Book 1, Camera & Lens: Studio, Darkroom, Equipment. New York: Morgan and Lester.
- Adams, Ansel (1948). Basic Photo Book 2, The Negative: Exposure and Development. New York: Morgan and Lester.
- Adams, Ansel (1950). Basic Photo Book 3, The Print: Contact Printing and Enlarging. New York: Morgan and Lester.
- Adams, Ansel (1952). Basic Photo Book 4, Natural Light Photography. New York: Morgan and Lester.
- Adams, Ansel (1956). Basic Photo Book 5, Artificial Light Photography. New York: Morgan and Lester.
- Adams, Ansel (1963). Polaroid Land Photography Manual. New York: Morgan & Morgan.
- Adams, Ansel (1974). Images 1923–1974. Boston, Massachusetts: New York Graphic Society. ISBN 978-0-8212-0600-3.
- Adams, Ansel; Baker, Robert (1978). Polaroid Land Photography. Boston, Massachusetts: New York Graphic Society. ISBN 978-0-8212-0729-1.
- Adams, Ansel (1979). Yosemite and the Range of Light. Boston, Massachusetts: New York Graphic Society. ISBN 978-0-8212-0750-5.

== Camera equipment ==
Most of Adams's best known images were taken with 8x10 and 4x5 view cameras. He also used a variety of other negative formats, from 35mm and medium format roll film through less common formats such as Polaroid type 55 and 7x17 panoramic cameras.

The 1958 documentary Ansel Adams, Photographer, narrated by Beaumont Newhall, gives an overview of Adams's toolkit at the time, with some examples of his camera outfits including:

- 8 × 10 view camera, 20 holders, 4 lenses – 1 Cooke Convertible, 1 ten-inch Wide Field Ektar, 1 9-inch Dagor, one 6-3/4-inch Wollensak wide angle.
- 7 × 17 special panorama camera with a Protar 13-1/2-inch lens and five holders.
- 4 × 5 view camera, 6 lenses – 12-inch Collinear, 8-1/2 APO Lanthar, 9-1/4 APO Tessar, 4-inch Wide Field Ektar, Dallmeyer London Telephoto

Adams mounted a platform on the roof of his car to allow him to take images with the view cameras from an elevated point of view.

== Photographic assistants ==
A number of men and women served as Adams' darkroom and printing assistants over the years, most of whom became accomplished photographers in their own right. His assistants were:

- Pirkle Jones (1914–2009), assisting from 1947–1953
- Don Worth (1924–2009), assisting from 1956–1960
- Liliane De Cock (1939–2013), assisting from 1963–1972
- Ted Orland (b. 1941), assisting from 1970–1974
- Alan Ross (b. 1948), assisting from 1974–1979
- John Sexton (photographer) (b. 1953), assisting from 1979–1984
- Chris Rainier (b. 1956), assisting from 1982–1984

== See also ==
- Environmental protection
- Monochrome photography

== General and cited references ==
- Adams, Ansel; Alinder, Mary Street (1985). Ansel Adams, an Autobiography. Boston, Massachusetts: Little, Brown. ISBN 978-0-8212-1596-8.
- Alinder, Mary; Stillman, Andrea; Adams, Ansel; Stegner, Wallace (1988). Ansel Adams: Letters and Images 1916–1984. Boston, Massachusetts: Little, Brown. ISBN 978-0-8212-1691-0.
- Alinder, Mary Street (1996). Ansel Adams: A Biography. New York: Henry Holt and Company. ISBN 978-0-8050-4116-3.
- Spaulding, Jonathan (1998). Ansel Adams and the American landscape: a biography (1st paperback ed.). University of California Press. ISBN 978-0-520-21663-1.
- Hammond, Anne; Adams, Ansel (2002). Ansel Adams: divine performance. Yale University Press. ISBN 978-0-300-09241-7.
- O'Toole, Erin (2010). No Democracy in Quality: Ansel Adams, Beaumont and Nancy Newhall, and the Founding of the Department of Photographs at the Museum of Modern Art (PDF) (PhD). University of Arizona. OCLC 659754857. ProQuest 305184615. Archived from the original (PDF) on December 10, 2025 – via University of Arizona id 3402933.
