= Evening, McDonald Lake, Glacier National Park =

1942 photograph by Ansel Adams

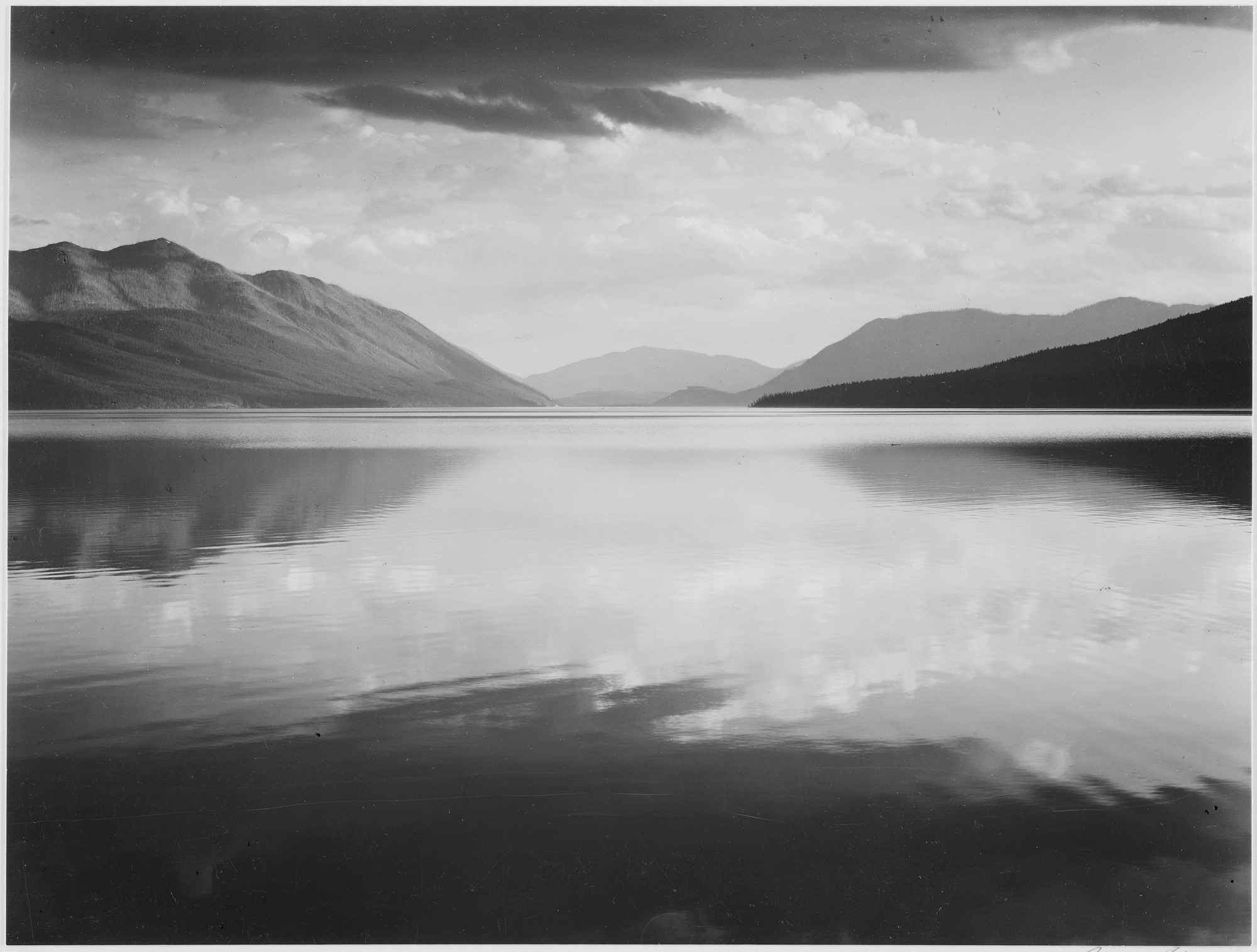
Evening, McDonald Lake, Glacier National Park (1942)

Evening, McDonald Lake, Glacier National Park is a black and white photograph taken by Ansel Adams in 1942. It was one of the group that he took detailing several national parks of the United States in 1941 and 1942 in the series named Ansel Adams Photographs of National Parks and Monuments, 1941 - 1942.

== Analysis ==
The picture was taken at the Glacier National Park in Montana and depicts a view of the Lake McDonald, looking across to the distant mountains and to the clouds. The photograph shows a large, still lake extending horizontally off the frame and halfway up vertically, reflecting the rest of the scene. In the distance, a mountain range can be seen, with a gap in the center and one faint smaller mountain in between. The sky is cloudy and large dark clouds rest at the very top of the frame.

== Public collections ==
A print of this picture is kept with the series Ansel Adams Photographs of National Parks and Monuments, 1941 - 1942 at the National Archives at College Park. There is also a print at the Library of Congress, in Washington, D.C.
