= List of photographs considered the most important =

- Image restricted due to copyright
- View photograph

This is a list of photographs considered the most important in surveys where authoritative sources review the history of the medium not limited by time period, region, genre, topic, or other specific criteria. These images may be referred to as the most important, most iconic, or most influential—and are considered key images in the history of photography.

== 19th century ==
=== Before 1850 ===
| Image | Title | Date | Photographer | Location | Format | Notes | Cited survey(s) |
|---|---|---|---|---|---|---|---|
| | View from the Window at Le Gras (French: Point de vue du Gras) | 1827 | Nicéphore Niépce | Saint-Loup-de-Varennes, France | Bitumen-coated pewter plate | Considered the oldest surviving camera photograph. | |
| | Windows from Inside South Gallery (Note: Talbot's 1835 photograph has also been referred to as Lacock Oriel Window (Latticed Window) or simply Latticed Window.) | August 1835 | William Henry Fox Talbot | Lacock, England, United Kingdom | Photogenic drawing negative | The earliest surviving photographic negative and the earliest surviving paper photograph. | |
| | The Artist's Studio | 1837 | Louis Daguerre | Paris, France | Daguerreotype | | |
| | Boulevard du Temple | 1838 | Louis Daguerre | Paris, France | Daguerreotype | The earliest surviving photograph depicting people: a person working as a shoeshiner and an individual having his shoes shined. | |
| | Self‐Portrait as a Drowned Man (Note: Also known as Le Noyé (lit. 'The drowned man').) | 18 October 1840 | Hippolyte Bayard | Paris, France | Direct Positive | Possibly the earliest known staged photograph, created in protest to the French government's apparent neglect of the invention of his photographic process. | |
| | The Haystack | 1844 (Note: The Metropolitan Museum of Art dates their copy of Talbot's Haystack as "probably 1841". The National Gallery of Canada dates it to April 1844.) | William Henry Fox Talbot | Lacock, England, United Kingdom | Calotype | A photograph that appeared in The Pencil of Nature, the first photographically illustrated book to be commercially published. | |

=== 1850s ===
| Image | Title | Date | Photographer | Location | Format | Notes | Cited survey(s) |
|---|---|---|---|---|---|---|---|
| | The Mime Charles Deburau as Pierrot | 1854 | Nadar | Paris, France | Salt print | The photograph is part of a series taken during the 1850s. (Note: View full collection of photographs at Wikimedia Commons.) | |
| | The Cook House of the 8th Hussars | April 1855 | Roger Fenton | Crimea | Salt print | | |
| | Valley of the Shadow of Death | 23 April 1855 | Roger Fenton | Sevastopol, Crimea | Wet collodion negative | Fenton's pictures during the Crimean War were one of the first cases of war photography, with Valley of the Shadow of Death considered "the most eloquent metaphor of warfare" by The Oxford Companion to the Photograph. | |
| | Sergeant Dawson and his Daughter | 1855 | Unknown; attributed to John Jabez Edwin Mayall | Unknown (Note: If the photographer is Mayall, then the location would be London, England as he was present there at the time.) | Unknown (likely albumen print) | | |
| | The Brig (Note: Gustave Le Grey's The Brig is also referred to as Brig on the Water and The Brig in Moonlight.) | 1856 | Gustave Le Gray | Normandy, France | Albumen print | | |
| | Portrait of Nariakira Shimazu | 17 September 1857 | Shiro Ichiki | Satsuma Domain, Japan | Daguerreotype | Oldest daguerreotype by a Japanese author; first photo designated an Important Cultural Property by the government of Japan in 1999. | |
| | Isambard Kingdom Brunel Standing Before the Launching Chains of the Great Eastern (Note: Robert Howlett's image is referred to as Isambard Kingdom Brunel before the Launch of the Leviathan in The Oxford Companion to the Photograph.) | November 1857 | Robert Howlett | London, England | Glass plate | Landmark environmental portraiture and iconography of the Industrial Revolution and 19th century. | |
| | Two Ways of Life | 1857 | Oscar Gustave Rejlander | Wolverhampton, England | Albumen print | | |
| | La Vallée de l'Huisne (River Scene) | 1857 | Camille Silvy | Nogent-le-Rotrou, France | Albumen print | | |
| | Fading Away | 1858 | Henry Peach Robinson | Warwickshire, England, United Kingdom | Albumen print | | |

=== 1860s ===
| Image | Title | Date | Photographer | Location | Format | Notes | Cited survey(s) |
|---|---|---|---|---|---|---|---|
| | Abraham Lincoln | 27 February 1860 | Mathew Brady | New York City, United States | Gelatin silver print | Taken shortly before Lincoln's Cooper Institute speech. Widely used in his campaign during the 1860 presidential election, both Brady's photo and the speech helped him become president. | |
| | Guardian Angel, One Person Praying | c. 1860 | Unknown | London, England, United Kingdom | Albumen print | | |
| | Boston, As the Eagle and the Wild Goose See It | 13 October 1860 | James Walice Black | Boston, Massachusetts, United States | Glass plate | Oldest extant aerial photograph. | |
| | Cathedral Rock | 1861 | Carleton Watkins | Yosemite National Park, California, United States | Albumen print | | |
| | The Dead of Antietam (Note: Alexander Gardener's 1862 The Dead of Antietam is also referred to as Civil War Battlefield or Bodies on the battlefield at Antietam.) | 1862 | Alexander Gardner | Antietam, Maryland, United States | Large-format glass plate | Showing the aftermath of the Battle of Antietam—the deadliest single day in the American Civil War | |
| | The Scourged Back | c. 2 April 1863 | McPherson & Oliver | Baton Rouge, Louisiana, United States | Albumen print | One of the most widely distributed photos of the abolitionist movement. | |
| | Cartes de Visite | May - August 1863 | Andre Adolphe Disderi | Paris, France | Albumen print | | |
| | The Home of a Rebel Sharpshooter, Gettysburg | July 1863 | Alexander Gardner | Gettysburg, Pennsylvania, United States | Large-format glass plate | | |
| | Sarah Bernhardt | 1864 | Nadar | Paris, France | Glass plate | | |
| | Wanted Poster | 20 April 1865 | Unknown | United States | Unknown | Broadside advertising reward for capture of Lincoln assassination conspirators, illustrated with photographic prints of John H. Surratt, John Wilkes Booth, and David E. Herold. | |
| | Execution of the Lincoln Conspirators at Washington Arsenal | 7 July 1865 | Alexander Gardner | Washington, D.C., United States | Albumen print | | |
| | Portrait of Sir John Herschel | 1867 | Julia Margaret Cameron | Hawkhurst, England, United Kingdom | Carbon print | Herschel would later be the godfather to Cameron's firstborn. | |
| | Call, I Follow, I Follow, Let Me Die! | 1867 | Julia Margaret Cameron | Hawkhurst, England, United Kingdom | Carbon print | | |
| | Close No. 193 High Street | 1868 | Thomas Annan | Glasgow, Scotland, United Kingdom | Photogravure | | |
| | East and West Shaking Hands at Laying Last Rail | 10 May 1869 | Andrew J. Russell | Promontory, Utah, United States | Glass plate | The ceremony for the driving of the golden spike at Promontory Summit, Utah, on May 10, 1869; completion of the First Transcontinental Railroad. Central Pacific Railroad (left), meets Union Pacific Railroad (right) and exchange bottles of water from the Pacific and Atlantic Oceans. | |

=== 1870s ===
| Image | Title | Date | Photographer | Location | Format | Notes | Cited survey(s) |
|---|---|---|---|---|---|---|---|
| | Old Faithful | 1870 | William Henry Jackson | Yellowstone National Park, Wyoming, United States | Mammoth-format plate | | |
| | Great Falls of the Yellowstone River | 1871 | William Henry Jackson | Yellowstone National Park, Wyoming, United States | Albumen print | | |
| | Chicago Fire | October 1871 | Unknown | Chicago, Illinois, United States | Unknown | | |
| | Ancient Ruins in the Canyon de Chelly | 1873 | Timothy O'Sullivan | Canyon de Chelly National Monument, Arizona, United States | Albumen print | | |
| | Steinway Hall | 2 December 1873 | Unknown | New York City, United States | Halftone print | Steinway Hall on East 14th Street, between University Place and Fifth Avenue in Manhattan. The first halftone print of a photo used in a periodical in the United States. | |
| | Composite Portraits of Criminal Types | 1877 | Francis Galton | London, England, United Kingdom | Unknown | | |
| | The Horse in Motion | June 1878 | Eadweard Muybridge | Palo Alto, California, United States | Composite from multiple glass plates | Series of cabinet cards regarded as a precursor to motion pictures. Pictured left is the variant Sallie Gardner at a Gallop, which further captured a horse's motion. | |

=== 1880s ===
| Image | Title | Date | Photographer | Location | Format | Notes | Cited survey(s) |
|---|---|---|---|---|---|---|---|
| | Street Arabs in the Area of Mulberry Street | 1880 | Jacob Riis | New York City, United States | Gelatin silver print | | |
| | Water Rats | 1886 | Frank Meadow Sutcliffe | Whitby, England, United Kingdom | Albumen print | | |
| | Bandits' Roost, 59 1/2 Mulberry Street | 1888 | Jacob Riis | Mulberry Bend, New York City, United States | Gelatin silver print | Part of How the Other Half Lives, an early photojournalist publication pursuing better conditions for the lower class of New York City. The photo and publication's impact was such that they contributed to the crime-ridden Bend's replacement with Columbus Park. | |

=== 1890s ===
| Image | Title | Date | Photographer | Location | Format | Notes | Cited survey(s) |
|---|---|---|---|---|---|---|---|
| | The Hand of Mrs. Wilhelm Röntgen | 1895 | Wilhelm Conrad Röntgen | Würzburg, Kingdom of Bavaria, Germany | X-ray | The first X-ray, taken by its inventor, featured his wife Anna's hand and ring. | |
| | Shroud of Turin negative | 28 May 1898 | Secondo Pia | Turin, Italy | Negative | Photographic negative of an ancient cloth relic that shows details of a scourged and crucified human body | |
| | Otto von Bismarck on His Deathbed | 30 July 1898 | Max Priester and Willy Wicke | Friedrichsruh, German Empire | Photograph | Post-mortem photograph of Otto von Bismarck taken shortly after his death | |
| | Organ Player and Singing Girl | 1898 | Eugène Atget | Paris, France | Gelatin silver print | | |
| | Portrait of Emil Racoviță | 1899 | Louis Boutan | Banyuls-sur-Mer, France | Glass plate | First underwater portrait, and the first taken by a camera designed for underwater photography. | |

== 20th century ==
=== 1900s ===
| Image | Title | Date | Photographer | Location | Format | Notes | Cited survey(s) |
|---|---|---|---|---|---|---|---|
| | A Sea of Steps | 1903 | Frederick H. Evans | Wells Cathedral, England, United Kingdom | Large Format | One of Evans's finest works in architectural photography. | |
| | First Flight | 17 December 1903 | John T. Daniels | Kill Devil Hills, North Carolina, United States | Glass plate | Captured flight of the first airplane, the Wright Flyer, flown by inventors Orville and Wilbur Wright. | |
| | The Vanishing Race–Navaho | 1904 | Edward S. Curtis | Arizona, United States | Photogravure | Taken during the cultural assimilation of Native Americans while also popularizing the Vanishing Indian stereotype. | |
| | The Flatiron | 1904 | Edward Steichen | New York City, United States | Blue-green pigment gum bichromate over platinum print | A print of this photograph became the second most expensive photograph ever sold on 9 November 2022, when it sold for $11,840,000, at Christie's New York, well above the estimate of $2,000,000–3,000,000. | |
| | The Pond—Moonlight | 1904 | Edward Steichen | Mamaroneck, New York, United States | Multiple gum bichromate print over platinum | Pictorialist hand-colored photograph; only three versions exist. In 2006, a print became the most expensive photo sold. | |
| | An Oasis in the Badlands | 1905 | Edward S. Curtis | South Dakota, United States | Glass plate | | |
| | Bichonnade in Flight | 1905 | Jacques Henri Lartigue | Paris, France | Gelatin silver print | | |
| | San Francisco Earthquake | 18 April 1906 | Arnold Genthe | San Francisco, California, United States | Unknown (likely gelatin silver print) | | |
| | The Steerage | 1907 | Alfred Stieglitz | Aboard the SS Kaiser Wilhelm II, possibly anchored at Plymouth, England, United Kingdom | Glass plate | Landmark modernist photo depicting immigrants on the SS Kaiser Wilhelm II. | |
| | Child Laborer in Newberry, South Carolina Cotton Mill (Note: Also titled Cotton Mill Girl. The collection item for the Library of Congress gives a much longer title that includes commentary from the photographer: A little spinner in the Mollahan Mills, Newberry, S.C. She was tending her "sides" like a veteran, but after I took the photo, the overseer came up and said in an apologetic tone that was pathetic, "She just happened in." Then a moment later he repeated the information. The mills appear to be full of youngsters that "just happened in," or " are helping sister." Dec. 3, 08. Witness Sara R. Hine. Location: Newberry, South Carolina.) | 1908 | Lewis Hine | Newberry, South Carolina, United States | Glass plate | Part of a series by the National Child Labor Committee to have child labor laws passed. | |
| | The North Pole | 6 April 1909 | Robert E. Peary | Arctic Ocean | | | |
| | Cactus Hot Air Balloon | 1909 | Léon Gimpel | Paris, France | Autochrome | | |

=== 1910s ===
| Image | Title | Date | Photographer | Location | Format | Notes | Cited survey(s) |
|---|---|---|---|---|---|---|---|
| | Breaker Boys | 1911 | Lewis Hine | Pittston, Pennsylvania, United States | Unknown (likely gelatin silver print) | Part of a series by the National Child Labor Committee to have child labor laws passed. | |
| | Triangle Shirtwaist Fire | 25 March 1911 | Brown Brothers | New York City, United States | | | |
| | The South Pole | 14 December 1911 | Bjorn Finstad | South Pole, Antarctica | Halftone Print | Amundsen's South Pole expedition | |
| | Girl with a Mirror | 1912 | Clarence H. White | New York City, United States | Platinum print | | |
| | Storyville Portrait | 1912 | E.J. Bellocq | Storyville, New Orleans, Louisiana, United States | Gelatin Silver Print | | |
| | Une Delage au Grand Prix de l'Automobile Club de France de 1912 | 1912 | Jacques-Henri Lartigue | Dieppe, France | Large Format | This photo depicts René Croquet, with his riding mechanic. (Note: Also titled Grand Prix of the Automobile Club de France, 1912 or Automobile Delage, Grand Prix de l'Automobile-Club de France, Le Tréport, 26 juin 1912 Sources including the Oxford University Press, erroneously claimed this photograph to be taken in 1912 (as dated by Lartique himself later) when it took place in 1913. The driver, identified as René Croquet, raced as No. 20 in 1912; he was driving a Théophile Schneider in both races, neither in a Delage. There was no No. 6 in the 1912 race.) | |
| | Gertrude Vanderbilt Whitney | 15 January 1913 | Baron Adolphe de Meyer | New York City, United States | | | |
| | Trampled by the Kings Horse | 4 June 1913 | Arthur Barrett | United Kingdom | | Emily Davison is struck by King George's horse, Anmer, and knocked unconscious. She died four days later from a fractured skull. | |
| | Abstraction, Porch Shadows (Note: Also referred to as Abstraction, Porch Shadows, Connecticut and Abstraction, Shadows of a Veranda, Connecticut.) | 1916 (Note: Also dated to 1913 and 1915.) | Paul Strand | Salisbury, Connecticut, United States | Silver-platinum print | | |
| | Passport of Isadora Duncan | 1916 | Copied by Brad Trent | United States | | | |
| | Blind Woman, New York | 1916 | Paul Strand | New York City, United States | Large format camera with trick lens and right-angle mirror | | |
| | Cottingley Fairies | 1917 | Elsie Wright | Cottingley, West Yorkshire, England, United Kingdom | Glass plate | | |
| | German Trenches Near Reims | 1918 | Julien Bryan | Reims, France | | | |

=== 1920s ===
| Image | Title | Date | Photographer | Location | Format | Notes | Cited survey(s) |
|---|---|---|---|---|---|---|---|
| | Armco Steel | 1922 | Edward Weston | Middletown, Ohio, United States | Gelatin silver print | | |
| | Le Violon d'Ingres | 1924 | Man Ray | Paris, France | Unknown | The photograph depicts Alice Prin, known as Kiki de Montparnasse, from the back and nude to below her waist. Two f-holes are painted on her back to make her body resemble a violin. | |
| | Movement Study | 1926 | Rudolf Koppitz | Vienna, Austria | Gelatin silver print on carte-postale | | |
| | Kiki with African Mask | 1926 | Man Ray | Paris, France | Gelatin silver print | | |
| | Charles Lindbergh, Croydon Aerodrome | 29 May 1927 | Pacific and Atlantic photos inc. | London, England, United Kingdom | | | |
| | Monolith, the Face of Half Dome | 1927 | Ansel Adams | Yosemite National Park, California, United States | Glass plate | | |
| | Bricklayer | 1928 | August Sander | Cologne, Germany | Gelatin silver print | | |
| | The Pastry Cook | 1928 | August Sander | Cologne, Germany | Large format | | |
| | Woman of Tehuantapec | 1929 | Tina Modotti | Tehuantepec, Mexico | Gelatin silver print | | |

=== 1930s ===
| | Title | Date | Photographer | Location | Format | Notes | Cited survey(s) |
|---|---|---|---|---|---|---|---|
| | The Hague | 3 January 1930 | Erich Salomon | The Hague, the Netherlands | Gelatin silver print | | |
| | Al Capone Mug Shot | 8 May 1930 | Miami Police Department | Miami, United States | | | |
| | Pepper No. 30 | 2 August 1930 | Edward Weston | Carmel-by-the-Sea, California, United States | 8x10 large format view camera | With carefully crafted tones of light, this photo of a pepper emphasizes third-dimensional depth while defying conventional interpretations of form. | |
| | Lynching | 7 August 1930 | Lawrence Beitier | Marion, Indiana, United States | | | |
| See article | Larmes | 1930 | Man Ray | Paris, France | Gelatin silver print | The photograph is an extreme close-up of a woman's upturned face with glass droplets placed on her cheeks to imitate tears. | |
| | Sleeping Woman | 1930 | Man Ray | Paris, France | Gelatin silver print | | |
| See article | Behind the Gare Saint-Lazare | 1932 | Henri Cartier-Bresson | Paris, France | 35 mm | | |
| Image restricted due to copyright; View photograph | Brussels | 1932 | Henri Cartier-Bresson | Brussels, Belgium | Gelatin silver print | | |
| Image restricted due to copyright; View photograph | Couple in Raccoon Coats | 1932 | James Van Der Zee | New York City, United States | Unknown | | |
| Image restricted due to copyright; View photograph | Io + gatto (I + Cat) | 1932 | Wanda Wulz | Trieste, Italy | Gelatin silver print | | |
| | Lunch atop a Skyscraper | 20 September 1932 | Photographer cannot be attributed with certainty – see article | New York City, United States | | | |
| | Dead Emu during Emu War | 25 November 1932 | | Campion, Australia | | | |
| | Bonnie and Clyde | 1933 | W. D. Jones | United States | | | |
| Image restricted due to copyright; View photograph | Girl with a Leica | 1934 | Alexander Rodchenko | Moscow, Moscow Oblast, Russia | Gelatin silver print | | |
| Image restricted due to copyright; View photograph | Hitler at a Nazi Party Rally | 1934 | Heinrich Hoffmann | Bückeburg, Germany | | | |
| | Surgeon's Photograph | 1934 | Ian Wetherell | Loch Ness, Scotland, United Kingdom | | | |
| | First AP Wirephoto | 1 January 1935 | Thomas Sande | Adirondack Mountains, New York, United States | Wirephoto | | |
| Image restricted due to copyright; View photograph | Lady Milbanke as 'Queen of the Amazons' | 1935 | Yevonde Middleton | London, England | | | |
| | Migrant Mother | 6 March 1936 | Dorothea Lange | Nipomo, California, United States | Large format | The photograph depicts Florence Owens Thompson, a destitute mother during the Great Depression. | |
| | Jesse Owens Salute | August 1936 | Heinrich Hoffmann | Berlin, Germany | Gelatin silver print | | |
| See article | The Falling Soldier | 5 September 1936 | Robert Capa | Espejo, Spain | 35 mm | The photograph depicts the death of Republican soldier Federico Borrell García in the Spanish Civil War. | |
| Image restricted due to copyright; View photograph | Fort Peck Dam | 1936 | Margaret Bourke-White | Fort Peck, Montana, United States | Gelatin silver print | | |
| Image restricted due to copyright; View photograph | Goldfish Bowl | 1937 | Herbert List | Santorini, Greece | Gelatin silver print | | |
| Image restricted due to copyright; View photograph | The Louisville Flood | January 1937 | Margaret Bourke-White | Louisville, Kentucky, United States | Large format | | |
| Image restricted due to copyright; View photograph | The Lambeth Walk | 1937 | Bill Brandt | London, United Kingdom | | | |
| | The Hindenburg Disaster | 6 May 1937 | Sam Shere | Manchester Township, New Jersey, United States | Unknown | The photograph depicts the Hindenburg Zeppelin on fire at the mooring mast of Lakehurst. | |
| | Bloody Saturday | 28 August 1937 | H. S. Wong | Shanghai, China | 35 mm | The photograph depicts a baby in bombed-out ruins in Shanghai. | |
| See article | Juvisy, France | 1938 | Henri Cartier‐Bresson | Juvisy-sur-Orge, France | Gelatin silver print | | |
| | Louis Knocks Out Schmeling | 1938 | Unknown photographer for the Associated Press | Bronx, New York, United States | | Joe Louis vs. Max Schmeling | |
| Image restricted due to copyright; View photograph | Aerial View of Manhattan | 1939 | Margaret Bourke-White | New York City, United States | | | |
| | Anne Frank | May 1939 | Polyfoto | Amsterdam, Netherlands | | | |
| Image restricted due to copyright; View photograph | Mainbocher Corset | August 1939 | Horst P. Horst | Paris, France | Large format | | |
| Image restricted due to copyright; View photograph | Mulberry Street | 21 September 1939 | Weegee | New York City, United States | Gelatin silver print | | |

=== 1940s ===
| Image | Title | Date | Photographer | Location | Format | Notes | Cited survey(s) |
|---|---|---|---|---|---|---|---|
| Image restricted due to copyright; View photograph | Anti-Jewish | 1 January 1940 | Henry Guttman | Germany | | | |
| The dome of St Paul's is surrounded by smoke. | St Paul's Survives | July 1940 | Herbert Mason | London, England, United Kingdom | Quarter-plate glass negative | | |
| | Buckingham Palace | 13 September 1940 | | London, England, United Kingdom | | | |
| | Moonrise, Hernandez, New Mexico | 1 November 1941 | Ansel Adams | Hernandez, New Mexico, United States | Gelatin silver print, large format | | |
| | The Roaring Lion | 30 December 1941 | Yousuf Karsh | Ottawa, Canada | Large format | Winston Churchill | |
| | "Grief" | 1942 | Dmitry Baltermants | Near Kerch, Crimea | 35 mm | | |
| | The Tetons and the Snake River | 1942 | Ansel Adams | Grand Teton National Park, Wyoming, United States | | | |
| | American Gothic | August 1942 | Gordon Parks | Washington, D.C., United States | 35 mm | | |
| | Betty Grable | 1943 | Frank Powolny | Los Angeles, California, United States | | | |
| | The Critic | 1943 | Weegee | New York City, United States | Unknown | | |
| | Warsaw Ghetto boy | 1943 | Unknown, possibly Franz Konrad | Warsaw, Poland | 35 mm | Originally titled Mit Gewalt aus Bunkern hervorgeholt ('Forcibly pulled out of bunkers') | |
| Image restricted due to copyright; View photograph | Three American Soldiers Ambushed on Buna Beach | 20 September 1943 | George Strock | Buna, Papua New Guinea | Unknown (likely medium format) | | |
| | Into the Jaws of Death | 6 June 1944 7:40 A.M. | Robert F. Sargent | Omaha Beach, France | | | |
| An American soldier on D-Day lying prone in water | The Magnificent Eleven (collection of 11 photographs) | 6 June 1944 | Robert Capa | Normandy, France | 35 mm | | |
| Image restricted due to copyright; View photograph | Prisoners' Hand Marks | 1944 | Roger Schall | Paris, France | | | |
| Image restricted due to copyright; View photograph | Saipan | 1944 | W. Eugene Smith | Saipan, Northern Mariana Islands | | | |
| | MacArthur Returns | 20 October 1944 | Gaetano Faillace | Leyte, Philippines | | General Douglas MacArthur and staff, accompanied by Philippine president Sergio Osmeña (left), land at Red Beach, Leyte | |
| Image restricted due to copyright; View photograph | Tide Pool, Point Lobos | 1945 | Edward Weston | Point Lobos, California, United States | Gelatin silver print | | |
| | Yalta Conference | 9 February 1945 | U.S. Army Signal Corps | Yalta, Crimea | | | |
| | Raising the Flag on Iwo Jima | 23 February 1945 | Joe Rosenthal | Iwo Jima, Japan | Large format | The photograph depicts the raising of the U.S. flag on Mount Suribachi during the Battle of Iwo Jima. | |
| Images restricted due to copyright; View photographs | Buchenwald | 15 April 1945 | Margaret Bourke-White | Ettersberg, Germany | | | |
| | Inside Buchenwald | 16 April 1945 | Private H. Miller | Ettersberg, Germany | | | |
| See article | Gestapo Informer Recognized by a Woman She Had Denounced | April 1945 | Henri Cartier‐Bresson | Dessau, Germany | 35 mm | | |
| | Benito Mussolini | 29 April 1945 | Vincenzo Carrese | Milan, Italy | | The dead body of Benito Mussolini next to his mistress Claretta Petacci and those of other executed fascists, on display in Piazzale Loreto, the same place that the fascists had displayed the bodies of fifteen Milanese civilians a year earlier after executing them in retaliation for resistance activity. | |
| | Raising a Flag over the Reichstag | 2 May 1945 | Yevgeny Khaldei | Berlin, Germany | 35 mm | The photograph depicts the raising of the Flag of the Soviet Union during Battle of Berlin. | |
| | Atomic Cloud Rises Over Nagasaki | 9 August 1945 | Charles Levy | Nagasaki, Japan | Unknown | The mushroom cloud over the Japanese city of Nagasaki, following its bombing | |
| picture of the same event taken by Victor Jorgensen | V-J Day in Times Square | 14 August 1945 | Alfred Eisenstaedt (pictured: same event taken by Victor Jorgensen) | New York City, United States | 35 mm | The photograph depicts a U.S. Navy sailor with a stranger on Victory over Japan Day. | |
| | Hiroshima, Three Weeks After the Bomb | 1945 | George Silk | Hiroshima, Japan | | | |
| Image restricted due to copyright; View photograph | Atomic Destruction | 1945 | Bernard Hoffman | Hiroshima, Japan | Gelatin silver print | The photograph was in the first collection depicting the aftermath of the nuclear bombing of Hiroshima. | |
| Image restricted due to copyright; View photograph | Gandhi at his Spinning Wheel | April 1946 | Margaret Bourke-White | India | Gelatin silver print | The photograph depicts Mahatma Gandhi reading beside his spinning wheel. | |
| Image restricted due to copyright; View photograph | The Dead Sea Scrolls | 1947 | Amit Shabi | Israel | | The photograph depicts the Dead Sea Scrolls, the most important collection of Biblical manuscripts. | |
| Image restricted due to copyright; View photograph | Route 66 | 1947 | Andreas Feininger | Route 66 in Arizona, United States | | | |
| | Babe Ruth Bows Out | 13 June 1948 | Nat Fein | New York City, United States | | | |
| Image restricted due to copyright; View photograph | Barn Owl with Vole | July 1948 | Eric Hosking | Suffolk, England, United Kingdom | Bromide print | | |
| | Dalí Atomicus | 1948 | Philippe Halsman | New York City, United States | Unknown | | |
| | Juris Upatnieks Demonstrating the Hologram | 1948 | Fritz Goro | Michigan, United States | | | |
| Image restricted due to copyright; View photograph | Country Doctor | 1948 | W. Eugene Smith | Kremmling, Colorado, United States | Gelatin silver print | | |
| Image restricted due to copyright; View photograph | Career Girl | 1948 | Leonard McCombe | New York City, United States | | | |
| Image restricted due to copyright; View photograph | Provençal Nude | 1949 | Willy Ronis | Gordes, France | Gelatin silver print | | |
| Image restricted due to copyright; View photograph | Nuns Watching Television | March 1949 | Ralph Morse | Erie, Pennsylvania, United States | | | |
| Image restricted due to copyright; View photograph | Clarence Hailey Long | 12 September 1949 | Leonard McCombe | Texas, United States | Gelatin silver print | | |

=== 1950s ===
| Image | Title | Date | Photographer | Location | Format | Notes | Cited survey(s) |
|---|---|---|---|---|---|---|---|
| Image restricted due to copyright; View photograph | The Kiss at the Hôtel de Ville (French: Les Amants de l'Hôtel de Ville) | 1950 | Robert Doisneau | Paris, France | 35 mm | | |
| | Iron Lung Polio Patients | 1950 | Unknown | Downey, California, United States | | | |
| | Albert Einstein | 1951 | Arthur Sasse | New York City, United States | 35 mm | | |
| | Photo 51 | May 1952 | Raymond Gosling and Rosalind Franklin | London, England | X-ray crystallograph | The photograph depicts an X-ray diffraction image providing key to DNA structure. | |
| Image restricted due to copyright; View photograph | Moving to the Suburbs | 9 December 1952 | J.R. Eyerman | Lakewood, California, United States | | | |
| Image restricted due to copyright; View photograph | The Announcement of Stalin's Death | 6 March 1953 | Dmitri Baltermants | Moscow, Moscow Oblast, Russia | Gelatin silver print | | |
| | Everest | 23 May 1953 | Sir Edmund Hillary | Mount Everest, Koshi Province, Nepal | | | |
| Image restricted due to copyright; View photograph | Atop Mount Everest | 23 May 1953 | Alfred Gregory | Mount Everest, Koshi Province, Nepal | | | |
| Image restricted due to copyright; View photograph | Camelot | July 1953 | Hy Peskin | Cape Cod, Massachusetts, United States | Gelatin silver print | | |
| | Roger Bannister | 6 May 1954 | Norman Potter | Oxford, England, United Kingdom | 35 mm | | |
| | Monroe | 9 September 1954 | Matty Zimmerman | New York City, United States | | The photograph depicts Marilyn Monroe while her white dress blows upwards during a shot for a scene in the 1955 film The Seven Year Itch. | |
| | Jackie Robinson | 1955 | Ralph Morse | Bronx, New York, United States | | | |
| Image restricted due to copyright; View photograph | Dovima with Elephants | August 1955 | Richard Avedon | Paris, France | Gelatin silver print | | |
| | Emmett Till's mother at his funeral. | 15 September 1955 | David Jackson | Chicago, Illinois, United States | | Emmett Till was a 14-year-old lynching victim whose mother Mamie Till-Bradley insisted on an open-casket funeral for her son, saying "I wanted the world to see what they did to my baby." | |
| Image restricted due to copyright; View photograph | Trolley – New Orleans | 1955 | Robert Frank | New Orleans, Louisiana, United States | 35 mm | | > |
| | Milk Drop Coronet | 10 January 1957 | Harold E. Edgerton | Cambridge, Massachusetts, United States | 35 mm | Two drops of milk imaged by fast-film stroboscopic photography | |
| | First Digital Photo | 1957 | Russell Kirsch | Gaithersburg, Maryland, United States | Photo composite of two binary scans | | |
| Image restricted due to copyright; View photograph | Hot Shot Eastbound at Iaeger Drive‐In | July 1957 | O. Winston Link | Iaeger, West Virginia, United States | Large format | | |
| | Elizabeth Eckford | 4 September 1957 | Will Counts | Little Rock, Arkansas, United States | | Eckford as one of the Little Rock Nine who faced opposition while attending a formerly segregated high school. | |
| Image restricted due to copyright; View photograph | Aspens, Northern New Mexico | 1958 | Ansel Adams | New Mexico, United States | Gelatin silver print | | |
| | The Integrated Circuit | 1959 | Robert Noyce | United States | | | |
| | First Satellite Image | 14 August 1959 | Explorer VI | 17000 miles above Mexico | | | |

=== 1960s ===
| Image | Title | Date | Photographer | Location | Format | Notes | Cited survey(s) |
|---|---|---|---|---|---|---|---|
| | Guerrillero Heroico | 5 March 1960 | Alberto Korda | Havana, Cuba | 35 mm | The photograph depicts Che Guevara at a funeral for the victims of the La Coubre explosion. The portrait is commonly displayed as a symbol of student protest and revolutionary movements, and has appeared on clothing and other merchandise. | |
| | Massacre at Sharpeville | 21 March 1960 | Ian Berry | Sharpeville, South Africa | | | |
| Image restricted due to copyright; View photograph | Case Study House no. 22, Los Angeles | June 1960 | Julius Shulman | Los Angeles, California, United States | Large format | | |
| | Nixon Vs Kennedy TV Debate | 26 September 1960 | Paul Schutzer | Chicago, Illinois, United States | 35 mm | | |
| | American Spy Pilot Francis Gary Powers | 16 November 1960 | Carl Mydans | Moscow, Russia | | | |
| | Flavio da Silva | 1961 | Gordon Parks | Rio de Janeiro, Brazil | | | |
| | Leap into Freedom | 15 August 1961 | Peter Leibing | Berlin, Germany | 35 mm | The photograph depicts Hans Conrad Schumann, an East German soldier running away over barbed-wire in Berlin. | |
| Image restricted due to copyright; View photograph | Thalidomide | 1962 | Stan Wayman | | | | |
| | Cuban Missile Crisis | 25 October 1962 | Neal Boenzi | New York City, United States | | Adlai Stevenson II shows aerial photos of Russian missiles in Cuba to the United Nations Security Council in the presence of USSR ambassador Valerian Zorin. | |
| Image restricted due to copyright; View photograph | Birmingham, Alabama | 3 May 1963 | Charles Moore | Birmingham, Alabama, United States | Gelatin silver print | Nonviolent civil rights movement student activists sprayed by high-pressure fire hoses during the Birmingham campaign's Children's Crusade. | |
| | Woolworth Sit-In | 28, May, 1963 | Fred Blackwell | Jackson, Mississippi, United States | | | |
| Image restricted due to copyright; View photograph | Nuit de Noël (Happy Club) | 1963 | Malick Sidibé | Bamako, Mali | Gelatin silver print | | |
| | The Burning Monk | 11 June 1963 | Malcolm Browne | Ho Chi Minh City, Vietnam | 35 mm | The photograph depicts the Vietnamese Buddhist monk Thích Quảng Đức protesting the persecution of Buddhists under the government of Ngo Dinh Diem by committing self-immolation. | |
| | I Have a Dream | 28 August 1963 | Agence France-Presse | Washington, D.C., United States | 35 mm | The photograph depicts Martin Luther King Jr. waving to supporters during the March on Washington, where he gave his "I Have a Dream" speech, considered the most famous American oration of the twentieth century. | |
| Image restricted due to copyright; View photograph | Zapruder film | 22 November 1963 | Abraham Zapruder | Dallas, Texas, United States | 35 mm internegative | The film depicts the most complete view of the assassination of US president John F. Kennedy. | |
| | Johnson Is Sworn In | 22 November 1963 | Cecil W. Stoughton | Dallas, Texas, United States | | Lyndon B. Johnson taking the oath of office aboard Air Force One at Love Field Airport two hours and eight minutes after the assassination of John F. Kennedy, Dallas, Texas. Jackie Kennedy (right), still in her blood-soaked clothes, looks on. | |
| | Jack Ruby Shoots Lee Harvey Oswald | 24 November 1963 | Robert H. Jackson | Dallas, Texas, United States | 35 mm | The photograph depicts the murder of Lee Harvey Oswald by Jack Ruby while Oswald was being escorted by police two days after he had assassinated US president John F. Kennedy. | |
| | The Beatles Arrive | 1964 | Harry Benson | New York City, United States | | | |
| Image restricted due to copyright; View photograph | Pillow Fight | January 1964 | Harry Benson | Paris, France | Gelatin silver print | | |
| | Selma March | 7 March 1965 | James H. Karales | Alabama, United States | | | |
| Image restricted due to copyright; View photograph | New View of Life, Fetus 18 Weeks | 1965 | Lennart Nilsson | Stockholm, Sweden | Unknown | | |
| Image restricted due to copyright; View photograph | Muhammad Ali vs. Sonny Liston II | 1965 | Neil Leifer | Lewiston, Maine, United States | Medium format | | |
| Image restricted due to copyright; View photograph | Jane Goodall Greets Baby Chimp | 1965 | Hugo van Lawick | Gombe Stream National Park, Tanzania | | | |
| | Chairman Mao Swims in the Yangtze | 1966 | Hou Bo | Wuhan, Hubei, China | | | |
| Image restricted due to copyright; View photograph | Reaching Out | 5 October 1966 | Larry Burrows | Mutter's Ridge, Vietnam | 35 mm | | |
| Image restricted due to copyright; View photograph | The Mini Moment | 3 December 1966 | Popperfoto | | | | |
| | The Boston Marathon | 19 May 1967 | Harry Trask | Boston, Massachusetts, United States | | Runner Kathrine Switzer attacked by race official Jock Semple while running in the 1967 Boston Marathon. | |
| Image restricted due to copyright; View photograph | The Jimi Hendrix Experience | 18 June 1967 | Jim Marshall | Monterey, California, United States | | | |
| | Twiggy | 1 March 1967 | Bernard Gotfryd | London, England, United Kingdom | | | |
| | Unidentified Flying Object | 1967 | Ralph Ditter | Zanesville, Ohio, United States | | | |
| | Patterson-Gimlin Film | 20 October 1967 | Roger Patterson | Pacific Northwest, United States | 16 mm | | |
| See article | Flower Power | 21 October 1967 | Bernie Boston | Washington, D.C., United States | 35 mm | | |
| | Saigon Execution | 1 February 1968 | Eddie Adams | Ho Chi Minh City, Vietnam | Unknown | | |
| | Massacre of Villagers in My Lai | 16 March 1968 | Ronald L. Haeberle | Sơn Mỹ, Vietnam | | The bodies of civilians including women and children after being murdered by U.S. Army soldiers as part of the My Lai war crime committed by the United States of America during the Vietnam War. | |
| | My Lai | 16 March 1968 | Ronald L. Haeberle | Sơn Mỹ, Vietnam | 35 mm | A group of civilian women and children before being killed by the U.S. Army. As part of the My Lai war crime committed by the United States of America. | |
| Image restricted due to copyright; View photograph | Assassination of Martin Luther King, Jr. | 4 April 1968 | Joseph Louw | Memphis, Tennessee, United States | | | |
| See article | Assassination of Robert F. Kennedy | 5 June 1968 | Bill Eppridge | Los Angeles, California, United States | 35 mm | | |
| | Chicago Democratic Convention Protest | August 1968 | Perry C. Riddle | United States | | | |
| Image restricted due to copyright; View photograph | Invasion of Prague | August 1968 | Josef Koudelka | Prague, Czechia | | | |
| Image restricted due to copyright; View photograph | Bratislava Tank Man | August 1968 | Ladislav Bielik | Bratislava, Slovakia | | | |
| | 1968 Olympics Black Power Salute | 16 October 1968 | John Dominis | Mexico City, Mexico | | | |
| | Earthrise | 24 December 1968 | William Anders | The Moon | Medium format | The photograph depicts the Earth and Moon's surface from Apollo 8. | |
| Image restricted due to copyright; View photograph | Albino Boy, Biafra | 1969 | Don McCullin | Biafra, West Africa | | | |
| | Canadian Seal Hunt | 1969 | Duncan Cameron | Northumberland Strait, Canada | | | |
| | One Week's Dead | 28 May - 3 June 1969 | Life Magazine | Various | | | |
| | Aerial View of Woodstock Festival | August 1969 | Burk Uzzle | Bethel, New York, United States | | | |
| Image restricted due to copyright; View photograph | Woodstock | August 1969 | Bill Eppridge | Bethel, New York, United States | | | |
| | Buzz Aldrin on the Moon | 21 July 1969 | Neil Armstrong | Sea of Tranquility, the Moon | 70 mm lunar surface camera | Buzz Aldrin during Apollo 11, the first crewed Moon landing | |
| | Apollo 11 Bootprint | 21 July 1969 | Buzz Aldrin | Sea of Tranquility, the Moon | 70 mm lunar surface camera | | |
| | Altamont | 6 December 1969 | Unknown photographer for the Associated Press | Altamont Speedway, California, United States | | | |

=== 1970s ===
| Image | Title | Date | Photographer | Location | Format | Notes | Cited survey(s) |
|---|---|---|---|---|---|---|---|
| See article (cropped) | Kent State Shootings | 4 May 1970 | John Paul Filo | Kent, Ohio, United States | Unknown | | |
| | Elvis Meets Nixon | 21 December 1970 | Oliver F. Atkins | Washington, D.C., United States | | | |
| See article | Tomoko and Mother in the Bath | 1971 | W. Eugene Smith | Kyūshū, Japan | | | |
| Image restricted due to copyright; View photograph | Windblown Jackie | 1971 | Ron Galella | New York City, United States | | | |
| | President Richard Nixon and Mao Zedong | 21 February 1972 | Unknown | Beijing, China | | | |
| | Nixon in China | 26 February 1972 | Oliver F. Atkins | Beijing, China | | | |
| | The Terror of War | 8 June 1972 | Disputed: either Nick Ut, Nguyễn Thành Nghệ, or Huỳnh Công Phúc | Trảng Bàng, Vietnam | 35 mm | The photograph depicts a crowd of Vietnamese people running from napalm, among them a girl (later identified as Phan Thi Kim Phuc) who survived by tearing off her burning clothes. | |
| | Munich Massacre | 5 September 1972 | Kurt Strumpf | Munich, Germany | 35 mm | | |
| Image restricted due to copyright; View photograph | Bullet Passing through a Candle Flame | 1973 | Doc Edgerton | United States | | | |
| Image restricted due to copyright; View photograph | Allende's Last Stand | 11 September 1973 | Orlando Lagos | Chile | 35 mm | | |
| | Patty Hearst Surveillance | 15 April 1974 | Hibernia Bank Surveillance Camera | San Francisco, California, United States | Surveillance camera still | Patty Hearst, during the April 1974 Hibernia bank robbery. | |
| Image restricted due to copyright; View photograph | Nixon Resignation | 9 August 1974 | Rolls Press | Washington, D.C., United States | | | |
| Image restricted due to copyright; View photograph | Water‐Towers | 1974–2009 | Bernd and Hilla Becher | Various locations across Europe and the United States | Large format | | |
| Image restricted due to copyright; View photograph | Prime Minister Gough Whitlam Pours Soil into the Hand of Traditional Gurindji Landowner Vincent Lingiari | 1975 | Mervyn Bishop | Daguragu, Northern Territory, Australia | | | |
| A crowd forms around an airplane door. An American man on the plane punches a Vietnamese man attempting to board. | Evacuation Terror | April 1975 | Thai Khac Chuong | Nha Trang, Vietnam | 35 mm | | |
| See article | Fire Escape Collapse | 22 July 1975 | Stanley Forman | Boston, Massachusetts, United States | | | |
| | Soweto Uprising | 16 June 1976 | Sam Nzima | Soweto, Gauteng, South Africa | 35 mm | | |
| | The Red Planet | 21 July 1976 | Viking 1 | Chryse Planitia, Mars | | First color photograph taken from the surface of Mars | |
| | Boat of No Smiles | 1977 | Eddie Adams | Gulf of Siam | | | |
| Image restricted due to copyright; View photograph | Untitled Film Stills | 1977–1980 | Cindy Sherman | New York City, United States | Unknown | | |
| | Cambodia | 1979 | Jay Ullal | Cambodia | | | |
| Image restricted due to copyright; View photograph | Brian Ridley and Lyle Heeter | 1979 | Robert Mapplethorpe | New York City, United States | | | |
| | Peace Treaty | 26 March 1979 | Yaakov Saar | Washington, D.C., United States | | The triple handshake in the peace treaty signing between Israel and Egypt on the White House lawn | |
| See article | Molotov Man | 16 July 1979 | Susan Meiselas | Estelí, Nicaragua | | | |
| | Firing Squad in Iran | 27 August 1979 | Jahangir Razmi | Kurdistan province, Iran | | | |

=== 1980s ===
| Image | Title | Date | Photographer | Location | Format | Notes | Cited survey(s) |
|---|---|---|---|---|---|---|---|
| Image restricted due to copyright; View photograph | John Lennon and Yoko Ono | 1980 | Annie Leibovitz | New York City, United States | | Lennon was murdered hours after the photograph was taken by Leibovitz | |
| Image restricted due to copyright; View photograph | Miracle on Ice | 1980 | Heinz Kluetmeier | Lake Placid, New York, United States | | | |
| | Starving Boy and Missionary | 1980 | Mike Wells | Uganda | | | |
| Image restricted due to copyright; View photograph | Self‐Portrait with Wife and Model | 1981 | Helmut Newton | Paris, France | | | |
| Image restricted due to copyright; View photograph | Diana with Bridesmaids in Buckingham Palace | 1981 | Patrick Anson, 5th Earl of Lichfield | London, England | | | |
| Image restricted due to copyright; View photograph | Behind Closed Doors | 1982 | Donna Ferrato | Saddle River, New Jersey, United States | | | |
| Image restricted due to copyright; View photograph | Androgyny (6 Men + 6 Women) | 1982 | Nancy Burson | | | | |
| | Ken Moody and Robert Sherman | 1984 | Robert Mapplethorpe | New York City, United States | | | |
| | Milk Carton | 1984 | Robert Frieder | Detroit, Michigan, United States | | | |
| Image restricted due to copyright; View photograph | Michael Jordan | 1984 | Co Rentmeester | Chapel Hill, North Carolina, United States | | Taken for a New Balance photoshoot. Ironically, this photo became the direct reference for the 'Jumpman' logo used by Jordan brand and owned by Nike. | |
| | Hole in the Ozone | 3 October 1985 | NASA | Greenbelt, Maryland, United States | | | |
| | Challenger Disaster | 28 January 1986 | Michele McDonald | Cape Canaveral, Florida, United States | | | |
| Image restricted due to copyright; View photograph | Ken Meeks, Patient with AIDS, Being Cared for by a Friend, San Francisco, California | 1986 | Alon Reininger | San Francisco, California, United States | | | |
| Image restricted due to copyright; View photograph | The Heart Transplant | 1 January 1987 | James L. Stanfield | Zabrze, Poland | | | |
| See article | Immersion (Piss Christ) | 1987 | Andres Serrano | United States | Medium format | | |
| Image restricted due to copyright; View photograph | Monkey Business | 1987 | National Enquirer | Bimini, the Bahamas | | | |
| See article | Willie Horton | 1987 | Unknown | Maryland, United States | | | |
| | Dukakis and the Tank | 1988 | Michael E. Samojeden | Detroit, Michigan, United States | | The infamous photo of Michael Dukakis taken as part of his presidential campaign. | |
| Image restricted due to copyright; View photograph | Air Jordan | 1988 | Walter Iooss | Chicago, Illinois, United States | Medium format | | |
| Image restricted due to copyright; View photograph | Untitled (Cowboy) | 1989 | Richard Prince | United States | Composite | | |
| Image restricted due to copyright; View photograph | Exxon Valdez Oil Spill | 24 March 1989 | John S. Lough | Alaska, United States | | | |
| See article | Tank Man | 5 June 1989 | Jeff Widener | Beijing, China | | The photograph depicts an unidentified protestor confronting column of Chinese military tanks. | |
| Image restricted due to copyright; View photograph | The Wall Falls | November 1989 | Robert Maass | Berlin, Germany | | | |
| Image restricted due to copyright; View photograph | Nicolae Ceausescu | December 1989 | Christopher Pillitz | Romania | | | |

=== 1990s ===
| Image | Title | Date | Photographer | Location | Format | Notes | Cited survey(s) |
|---|---|---|---|---|---|---|---|
| See article | The Face of AIDS | 1990 | Therese Frare | Columbus, Ohio, United States | | | |
| Image restricted due to copyright; View photograph | Operation Desert Storm | 27 February 1991 | David Turnley | Iraq | 35 mm | | |
| Image restricted due to copyright; View photograph | Camels in the Oil Fields | 1 March 1991 | Steve McCurry | Burgan field, Kuwait | | | |
| See article | L.A. Police Beating Rodney King | 3 March 1991 | George Holiday | Los Angeles, California, United States | | | |
| See article | More Demi Moore | 1991 | Annie Leibovitz | Culver City, California, United States | | | |
| Image restricted due to copyright; View photograph | Famine in Somalia | 1992 | James Nachtwey | Baidoa, Somalia | | | |
| See article | Dead Troops Talk | 1992 | Jeff Wall | Burnaby, British Columbia | Large format lightbox transparency | The full title of this staged photograph is "Dead Troops Talk (A vision after an ambush of a Red Army patrol, near Moqor, Afghanistan, winter 1986)". | |
| Image restricted due to copyright; View photograph | Bosnia | 2 April 1992 | Ron Haviv | Bijeljina, Bosnia and Herzegovina | 35 mm | | |
| See article | The Vulture and the Little Girl | March 1993 | Kevin Carter | Ayod, Sudan (now South Sudan) | 35 mm | | |
| | Beauty Out of Damage | 1993 | Matuschka | United States | | Matuschka's controversial self portrait baring her mastectomy combined with her face. The photo covered the New York Times Sunday Magazine and helped spark debate about breast cancer around the US and the world | |
| | Rwandan Children | 1994 | Seamus Conlan and Tara Farrell | Rwanda | | | |
| Image restricted due to copyright; View photograph | Oklahoma City Bombing | 19 April 1995 | Charles Porter IV | Oklahoma City, Oklahoma, United States | | | |
| Image restricted due to copyright; View photograph | Giant Iceberg | 1995 | Dr. Hans Oerter | Antarctic Peninsula, Antarctica | | | |
| | Pillars of Creation | 1995 | Hubble Space Telescope / NASA | Low Earth orbit | Wide field and planetary camera | The photograph depicts a region of star formation. | |
| Image restricted due to copyright; View photograph | Bill Clinton hugs Monica Lewinsky | 1996 | Dirck Halstead | Washington, D.C., United States | 35 mm | | |
| | First Cell-Phone Picture | 11 June 1997 | Philippe Kahn | Santa Cruz, California, United States | Camera phone | The subject is Sophie, the daughter of Philippe Kahn | |
| See article | 99 Cent | 1999 | Andreas Gursky | Los Angeles, California, United States | chromogenic print face-mounted to acrylic | | |
| Image restricted due to copyright; View photograph | Kosovo Refugees | 3 May 1999 | Carol Guzy | Kukës, Albania | | | |
| Image restricted due to copyright; View photograph | World Cup Winners | 1999 | Robert Beck | Pasadena, California, United States | | | |

== 21st century ==
=== 2000s ===
| Image | Title | Date | Photographer | Location | Format | Notes | Cited survey(s) |
|---|---|---|---|---|---|---|---|
| Image restricted due to copyright; View photograph | Elian Gonzalez Federal Raid | 2000 | Alan Diaz | Miami, Florida, United States | | | |
| Image restricted due to copyright; View photograph | Surfing Hippos | 2000 | Michael Nichols | Loango National Park, Gabon | | | |
| | The First Plane Hits the World Trade Center | 11 September 2001 | Jules Naudet | New York City, United States | | A screenshot of the Jules Naudet footage that is included in the Naudet brothers' documentary film 9/11, originally broadcast on March 10, 2002, on CBS, and later released on DVD. | |
| Image restricted due to copyright; View photograph | President George W. Bush Learns of the September 11th Attacks | 11 September 2001 | Doug Mills | Sarasota, Florida, United States | | | |
| See article | The Falling Man | 11 September 2001 9:41:15 A.M. | Richard Drew | New York City, United States | | Depicts a man who either fell from the burning World Trade Center or jumped to avoid being burned to death | |
| Image restricted due to copyright; View photograph | New Yorkers watch the collapse of the South Tower of the World Trade Center | 11 September 2001 | Patrick Witty | New York City, United States | | | |
| Image restricted due to copyright; View photograph | Father Judge | 11 September 2001 | Shannon Stapleton | New York City, United States | | | |
| See article | Raising the Flag at Ground Zero | 11 September 2001 | Thomas E. Franklin | New York City, United States | | | |
| | Toppling the Statue of Saddam Hussein | 9 April 2003 | Goran Tomasevic | Baghdad, Iraq | 35 mm | | |
| | The Pencil Nebula | 5 June 2003 | Hubble Space Telescope / NASA | Low Earth orbit | Wide field and planetary camera | | |
| | The Hooded Man | 4 November 2003 | Ivan Frederick | Abu Ghraib, Iraq | | The photograph depicts Abdou Hussain Saad Faleh, an Abu Ghraib prisoner, being subjected to torture. | |
| | Capture of Saddam Hussein | 13 December 2003 | Unknown | Ad-Dawr, Iraq | | Photo depicts Samir, a 34-year-old Iraqi-American military interpreter, capturing former Iraqi president Saddam Hussein. | |
| Image restricted due to copyright; View photograph | Sakura Lisi | 2004 | Marcus Bleasdale | Mongbwalu, Ituri Province, Democratic Republic of the Congo | | The washing of the body at the burial of the eight-month-old Sakura Lisi, the daughter of a gold miner in Mongbwalu, northeastern Congo | |
| Image restricted due to copyright; View photograph | Coffin Ban | 2004 | Tami Silicio | Kuwait International Airport, Farwaniya Governorate, Kuwait | | | |
| Image restricted due to copyright; View photograph | Iraqi Girl | 18 January 2005 | Chris Hondros | Tal Afar, Iraq | | | |
| Image restricted due to copyright; View photograph | Hurricane Katrina Evacuation | 3 September 2005 | Eric Gay | New Orleans, Louisiana, United States | | | |
| Image restricted due to copyright; View photograph | Hurricane Katrina | 4 September 2005 | Robert Galbraith | New Orleans, Louisiana, United States | | | |
| Image restricted due to copyright; View photograph | Hurricane Katrina | 2005 | David Phillip | New Orleans, Louisiana, United States | | | |
| Image restricted due to copyright; View photograph | Jim Comes Home | 2005 | Todd Heisler | Aurora, Colorado, United States | | | |
| Image restricted due to copyright; View photograph | The Power of One | 1 February 2006 | Oded Bality | Amona, West Bank | 35 mm | | |
| Image restricted due to copyright; View photograph | Gorilla in the Congo | July 2007 | Brent Stirton | Virunga National Park, North Kivu, Democratic Republic of the Congo | 35 mm | | |
| Image restricted due to copyright; View photograph | Memorial Day at Arlington National Cemetery | 27 May 2007 | John Moore | Arlington, Virginia, United States | | | |
| Image restricted due to copyright; View photograph | Homecoming | 2007 | Louie Favorite | Atlanta, Georgia, United States | | | |
| Image restricted due to copyright; View photograph | Photo Finish | 16 August 2008 | Heinz Kluetmeier | Beijing, China | 35 mm | | |
| Image restricted due to copyright; View photograph | Married at Last | 2008 | Marcio Sanchez | San Francisco, California, United States | | See Del Martin and Phyllis Lyon | |
| Image restricted due to copyright; View photograph | The New First Family | 2008 | Win McNamee | Chicago, Illinois, United States | | | |
| Image restricted due to copyright; View photograph | Funeral of Edwin Cobbin | 2009 | Barbara Davidson | Hawthorne, California, United States | | | |
| See article | Diego Frazão Torquato | 2009 | Marcos Tristao | Rio de Janeiro, Rio de Janeiro, Brazil | | | |
| | Hair Like Mine | 2009 | Pete Souza | Washington, D.C., United States | | | |
| Image restricted due to copyright; View photograph | The Death of Neda | 2009 | Unknown | Tehran, Iran | | | |

=== 2010s ===
| Image | Title | Date | Photographer | Location | Format | Notes | Cited survey(s) |
|---|---|---|---|---|---|---|---|
| Image restricted due to copyright; View photograph | First Instagram Photo (Note: Originally captioned "test".) | 16 July 2010 | Kevin Systrom | Mexico | Cell phone | Kevin Systrom (co-founder of Instagram), the BBC, Time, and Life magazine claim the photograph to be the first shared on Instagram, however The Economic Times and The Guardian claim the first photograph posted to the social media to be a picture of San Francisco's South Beach harbor by Mike Krieger, also co-founder. Time later claimed the post of the harbor was the first shared. | |
| | Situation Room | 1 May 2011 | Pete Souza | Washington, D.C., United States | 35 mm | Barack Obama and his national security team, in the White House Situation Room during the killing of Osama bin Laden | |
| Image restricted due to copyright; View photograph | 9/11 Memorial | 11 September 2011 | Justin Lane | New York City, United States | | | |
| Image restricted due to copyright; View photograph | Aida | 12 March 2012 | Rodrigo Abd | Idlib, Syria | | | |
| Image restricted due to copyright; View photograph | Fashion Week | 7 September 2012 | Lucas Jackson | New York City, United States | | | |
| Image restricted due to copyright; View photograph | Shootings as Routine | 14 December 2012 | Jessica Hill | Newtown, Connecticut, United States | | The photograph shows Carlee Soto using a phone to ask about her sister, Victoria Soto, a teacher at the Sandy Hook Elementary School, after gunman Adam Lanza opened fire on the school, killing 26, including Victoria. | |
| Image restricted due to copyright; View photograph | Sandy Hook | 14 December 2012 | Shannon Hicks | Newtown, Connecticut, United States | | | |
| Image restricted due to copyright; View photograph | China Social Suicide | 27 February 2013 | Agence France-Presse | Wuhan, Hubei, China | | | |
| Image restricted due to copyright; View photograph | North Korea | 2013 | David Guttenfelder | Pyongyang, North Korea | | | |
| Image restricted due to copyright; View photograph | Boston Marathon Bombing | 2013 | John Tlumacki | Boston, Massachusetts, United States | | | |
| See article | Final Embrace | April 2013 | Taslima Akhter | Savar Upazila, Bangladesh | | | |
| Image restricted due to copyright; View photograph | Nairobi Mall Attack | 21 September 2013 | Tyler Hicks | Nairobi, Kenya | | | |
| See article | Oscar Selfie | 2 March 2014 | Bradley Cooper | Los Angeles, California, United States | Cell phone | The photograph is a selfie taken at the 2014 Oscars. The image shows Ellen DeGeneres, Meryl Streep, Bradley Cooper, Jennifer Lawrence, Julia Roberts, Kevin Spacey, Channing Tatum, Brad Pitt, Angelina Jolie, Lupita Nyong'o, and her brother, Peter Nyong'o. | |
| Image restricted due to copyright; View photograph | Turkey Mine Blast | 13 May 2014 | Bülent Kılıç | Soma, Manisa Province, Turkey | | | |
| See article | Alan Kurdi | 2 September 2015 | Nilufer Demir | Bodrum, Muğla Province, Turkey | Unknown | | |
| Image restricted due to copyright; View photograph | Turkish Coast Guard Rescue | 2016 | Emin Menguarslan | Aydın, Aydın Province, Turkey | | | |
| | Yarmouk Refugees | 26 January 2017 | UNRWA | Damascus, Syria | | | |
| Image restricted due to copyright; View photograph | Climate Change | 2018 | Sergio Pitamitz | Svalbard, Norway | | The photograph depicts a polar bear standing on a melting ice sheet. | |

=== 2020s ===
| Image | Title | Date | Photographer | Location | Format | Subject | Cited survey(s) |
|---|---|---|---|---|---|---|---|
| Image restricted due to copyright; View photograph | The Capitol Under Attack | 6 January 2021 | Tayfun Coşkun | Washington, D.C., United States | | January 6 United States Capitol attack | |
| | Out of Afghanistan | 29 August 2021 | Alexander Burnett | Kabul, Afghanistan | Cell Phone | Chris Donahue, becoming the last American soldier to leave Afghanistan before the Fall of Kabul | |

== See also ==
- List of most expensive photographs
- 100 Photographs that Changed the World, 2003 book by the editors of Life
- Fine-art photography
- History of the camera
- History of photography
- Pulitzer Prize for Photography
- Pulitzer Prize for Feature Photography
- Pulitzer Prize for Breaking News Photography
- Timeline of first images of Earth from space
- World Press Photo of the Year
- List of notable media in the field of meteorology

== Sources ==
These surveys of the history of photography determine which images are included in the list.
