= Jacobo Montvelisky =

Costa Rican photographer

- Born: Jacobo Montvelisky; November 5, 1988 (age 36); San José, Costa Rica
- Education: Interdisciplinary Center Herzliya
- Known for: Photography
- Notable work: Route 66
- Website: Official website

Jacobo Montvelisky (born November 5, 1988) is a Costa Rican photographer and entrepreneur, whose style is marked by and best known for his work in fine art photography and landscape photography. His photographic work focuses on capturing and preserving moments with valuable historical connotation. Montvelisky currently works between San José and Panama City as the CEO for a Digital Agency.

== Major exhibitions ==
- Panama: Allegro Gallery / Museum of Contemporary Art (Panama): "Route 66". 2014.
