= Lindsay Robertson (photographer) =

Scottish photographer

Lindsay Robertson is a Scottish photographer, who is best known as the only British artist to have exhibited alongside Ansel Adams. Inspired by the conservationist John Muir, he has worked for 35 years as a professional photographer, producing mainly monochrome images of large deserted US and UK landscapes that are influenced by Adams, and Scottish landscape photography pioneer John Muir. Robertson claims his photography is concerned with capturing "a moment in our time".

== Exhibition history ==
- 2008 The Landscape Photography of Lindsay Robertson, City Art Centre, Edinburgh
