= Larmes =

1932 artistic photograph by Man Ray

- Larmes de Verre (French), Glass Tears (English)
- Artist: Man Ray
- Year: 1932
- Medium: Gelatin silver print

Larmes, or Tears; aka Larmes de Verre, in English, Glass Tears, is a black and white photograph created between 1930 and 1932 by the American photographer Man Ray.

== History and description ==
The image was published in the December 1935 issue of the surrealist art magazine Minotaure, though a similar image of a single eye had appeared in a 1934 book of Ray's photographs.

The photograph is an extreme close-up of a woman's upturned face with glass droplets placed on her cheeks to imitate tears. Differing interpretations have been given for the meaning of the photograph. Art historian Erin C. Garcia wrote that Ray "emulated the melodrama that compensated for the lack of dialogue in silent films" in Larmes and likened the model's eyes to "insect-like creatures with hundreds of legs", and another critic wondered whether the image was "ridiculing female crocodile tears, or pouring scorn on the men who are taken in by such sentimentalism".

A 1995 sale of Larmes valued the image at between $200,000-$250,000.

== Public collections ==
A print of Larmes is held in the collection of the J. Paul Getty Museum, in Los Angeles.

== See also ==
- List of photographs considered the most important
