= Aspens, Northern New Mexico =

1958 photograph by Ansel Adams

Aspens, Northern New Mexico is a black and white photograph by American photographer Ansel Adams, taken in 1958.

== History and description ==
Adams took the picture while driving back from a trip to Canyon de Chelly, in Arizona, with his wife, Virginia, and two assistant photographers, Gerry Sharpe and Don Worth, in the autumn of 1958. His attention was suddenly caught by a grove of aspens, in New Mexico, in particular by their golden leaves. He quickly decided to stop and photograph the scene. He explained: “We were in the shadow of the mountains [north of Santa Fe], the light was cool and quiet and no wind was stirring. The aspen trunks were slightly greenish and the leaves were a vibrant yellow. The forest floor was covered with a tangle of russet shrubs. It was very quiet.”

Adams considered taking a picture in color, but he decided to do it in black and white, his favourite medium, which allowed him to enhance the contrast between the forest shadows and the tree's leaves. Adams said that "The majority of viewers of the horizontal image think it was a sunlit scene. When I explain that it represented diffused lighting from the sky and also reflected light from distant clouds, some rejoin, “Then why does it look the way it does?” Such questions remind me that many viewers expect a photograph to be the literal simulation of reality; of course, many others are capable of response to an image without concern for the physical realities of the subject."

== Art market ==
A print of the photograph sold by $439,500 at Christie's New York, on 6 April 2017.

== Public collections ==
There are prints of the photograph, among other public collections, at the Museum of Modern Art, in New York, the Whitney Museum of American Art, in New York, the National Museum of American History, in Washington, D.C., the Princeton University Art Museum, in Princeton, and the Museum of Fine Arts, in Houston.

== See also ==
- List of photographs considered the most important
