= Diego Frazão Torquato =

Brazilian violinist, subject of a famous photograph (1997–2010)

- The 2009 photograph of Torquato playing at his teacher's funeral

Background information
- Also known as: Diego do Violino
- Born: 1997
- Died: 1 April 2010 (aged 12–13) Duque de Caxias, Rio de Janeiro
- Instrument: Violin
- Years active: ~2000-2010
- Formerly of: AfroReggae String Orchestra

Diego Frazão Torquato, nicknamed "Diego do Violino" (Note: lit. 'Diego of the violin') (1997 – Duque de Caxias, 1 April 2010), was a Brazilian violinist who became famous for a photograph in which he is shown playing a violin at his teacher's funeral. The newspaper O Globo called the image "one of the most moving in recent times". Torquato was part of the AfroReggae String Orchestra, and the image subsequently "became a symbol of hope" for the fight against leukemia and gained the group popularity.

== Life ==
Torquato was born in 1997. From a young age, Diego lived with illnesses, such as meningitis, but retained an interest in music. Torquato participated in the AfroReggae String Orchestra Group's workshops in Parada de Lucas and became a notable of the group, which worked to combat the entry of young people into drug trafficking. In December 2009, he participated in Rede Globo's end-of-year anti-trafficking campaign. He was nominated in 2010 for the Faz Diferença Award from the newspaper O Globo.

=== Illnesses and death ===
Torquato was subjected to a 24-day hospitalization, after he suffered a generalized infection, which was contracted after appendix surgery. He depended on the help of blood-regulation devices to retain a stable blood pressure, but went into cardiorespiratory arrest. During this period, he was also admitted to Saracuruna Hospital with acute leukemia, but was unable to undergo chemotherapy due to the risk of the procedure. Shortly afterwards, he died as a result of the cardiorespiratory arrest.

== See also ==
- List of photographs considered the most important
