= Abstraction, Porch Shadows =

Photograph by Paul Strand

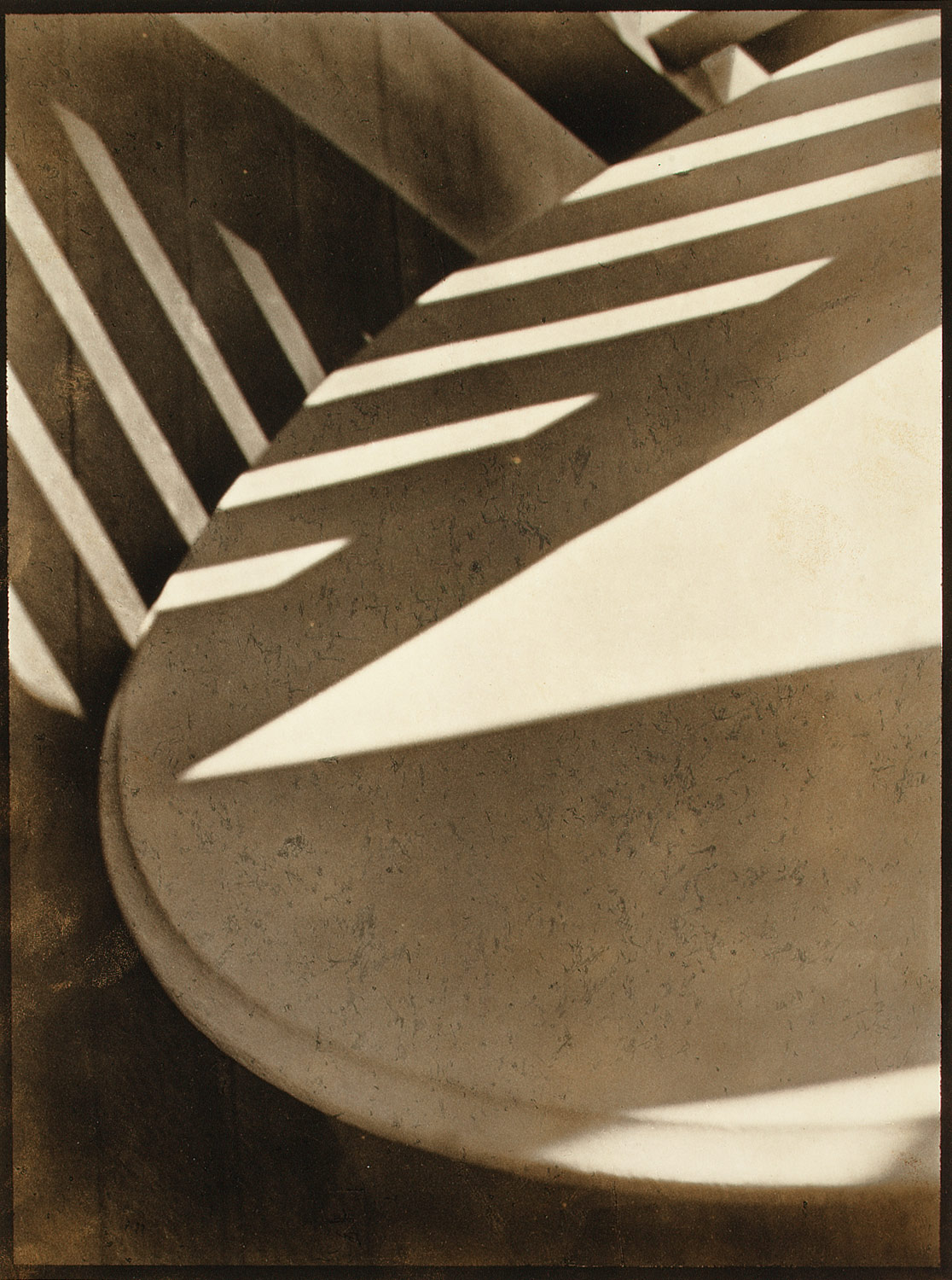
Abstraction, Porch Shadows (1916) by Paul Strand

Abstraction, Porch Shadows, also known as Abstraction, Porch Shadows, Twin Lakes, Connecticut, is a black and white photograph taken by Paul Strand in 1916. It is one of the best known photographs of his early phase, and shows the influence of cubism and abstractionism. It is considered one of the first abstract photographs ever made.

== History and description ==
Strand spent the Summer of 1916 at a cottage in Twin Lakes, Connecticut. Strand's interest and understanding of the cubist esthetics, "abstraction through fragmentation, multiple points of view, and a reduction of people and objects to basic geometry", according to The Art Institute of Chicago website, led him to transform everyday objects, like furniture and crockery, into works of abstract photographic art. In this case, Strand took aim to a round table located in a terrace porch. He abandoned the traditional photographic perspective, making the table look inclined, and his use of the light that enters the terrace windows makes for the shadows and the impressive geometrical forms of the picture, including the parallelograms and the large triangle of the right.

His colleague Alfred Stieglitz published a print of this photograph at his magazine Camera Work and praised it as "the direct expression of today."

== Public collections ==
There are prints of the photograph at several museums, including the Museum of Modern Art, in New York, the Metropolitan Museum of Art, in New York, the Philadelphia Museum of Art, The Art Institute of Chicago, the Museum of Fine Arts, in Houston, the Yale University Art Gallery, the San Francisco Museum of Modern Art, and the Princeton University Art Museum.

== See also ==
- List of photographs considered the most important
