= John Jabez Edwin Mayall =

English photographer (1813–1901)

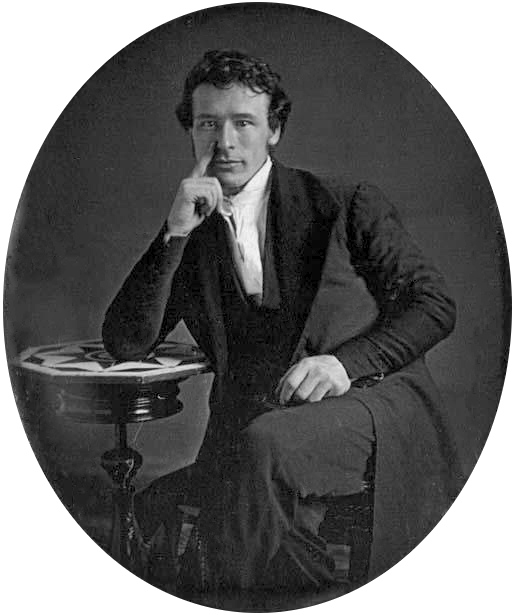
- Self-portrait of Mayall (daguerreotype, c. 1844)
- Born: 17 September 1813; Oldham, England
- Died: 6 March 1901 (aged 87); Southwick, England
- Occupation: Photographer
- Years active: 1841−1888

John Jabez Edwin Paisley Mayall (17 September 1813 – 6 March 1901) was an English photographer who in 1860 took the first carte-de-visite photographs of Queen Victoria. He also captured other famous people such as Charles Dickens and Karl Marx. His photograph of "Sergeant Dawson and his daughter" has been considered one of the most important photographs in history.

== Early life ==
He was the son of John and Elizabeth Meal, born into a Baptist family on 17 September 1813, at Chamber Hall, near Bury in the county of Lancashire; his birth name was registered as Jabez Meal.

== North America ==
Mayall moved to Philadelphia in late 1841 or early 1842, and first practised as a photographer at 140 Chestnut Street until 1846.

== Fine art photography ==
Gernsheim describes Mayall as "the earliest exponent of fine art photography," in advance of Oscar Rejlander and Julia-Margaret Cameron, on the basis of his production in Philadelphia of ten daguerreotype in 1845 to illustrate The Lord's Prayer and his later, larger (24" x 15"; 61 cm x 38 cm) "daguerreotype pictures to illustrate poetry and sentiment." These were shown in 1851 at the Great Exhibition; The Soldier's Dream, The Venerable Bede blessing a child, and Bacchus and Ariadne. However, he was discouraged by the judgement of The Athenaeum: "To us these pictures seem a mistake. At best, we can only hope to get a mere naturalistic rendering. Ideality is unattainable–and imagination supplanted by the presence of fact." Not even Prince Albert's encouragement could dissuade Mayall from ceasing his pursuit of photography as art. A year after exhibiting at the Crystal Palace he limited remarks to the verisimilitude, rather than the artistry, of the daguerreotype;

Viewed through an ordinary magnifying-glass, the resemblance of the portrait is perfectly staggering–the features stand forth as though moulded in wax–not a blemish escapes, nor is a beauty lost [ ... ] All hail to the fertile genius of man! Independently of the wonders of daguerreotyping, there is something very benign and gratifying in its application –the memory of the absent or the dead is faithfully treasured in the possession of one of these beautiful little specimens.

Nevertheless, his royal portraits were described as "very beautiful specimens of the photographic art," and when in Brighton from 1864, Mayall advertised himself as "Artist and Photographer", and a notice in his studio read: "sitters are requested to place themselves as much as possible in the hands of the artist."

His photograph of Sergeant Thomas Dawson and his daughter, the former of whom lost an arm in battle, is considered one of the most important photographs ever taken.

== Return to England ==
Mayall arrived in London from America in 1846, and by August 1848 had placed advertisements describing himself as "Mr. Mayall of Philadelphia, United States." Mayall called his studio/gallery the "American Daguerreotype Institution".

== Portraits of eminent people ==
Mayall's daguerreotype portrait of Charles Dickens was made between 1853 and 1855, and auctioned with a reserve of £30,000 by Christies in May 2001.

In May 1860, Mayall made a number of portraits of the Royal Family. He was given permission to publish the portraits of the Royal Family as a set of cartes-de-visite. In August 1860, the cartes were released in the form of a Royal Album, consisting of 14 small portraits of Queen Victoria, Prince Albert and their children. The Royal Album was an immediate success, and hundreds of thousands were sold as Britons began collecting carte de visite portraits of famous people, a fad which Gernsheim credits to the popularity of Mayall's royal portraits.

Another series of royal portraits by Mayall was published in 1861 and when Prince Albert succumbed to typhoid fever in December 1861, his death created an enormous demand for his portrait. The Photographic News later reported that within one week of his death "no less than 70,000 of his carte de visite were ordered from Marion & Co." By the end of the decade, Marion & Co, had paid Mayall £35,000 for his portraits of the Royal Family which established the carte de visite (cdv) as his most popular portrait format, of which the Mayall establishment produced over half a million cartes a year, which helped him secure an annual income of £12,000.

The German philosopher Karl Marx sat for Mayall as early as 1872, and returned in 1875 for another session of photography. The photos from 1875 were widely disseminated, and his collaborator Friedrich Engels called them "the final, the best picture, showing [Marx] in all his serene, confident, Olympian calmness."

== Brighton ==
Mayall left his eldest son Edwin to run his London studios and moved down to Brighton with his wife and two younger sons. On 18 July 1864, he opened his new photographic portrait studio at 90-91 Kings Road, close to the recently built Grand Hotel. In an announcement placed in the pages of the Brighton Examiner, he stated that he had "spared neither pains nor expertise in preparing, for the accommodation of the nobility and gentry resident at or visiting Brighton, one of the most efficient studios ever built." Although he addressed his comments particularly to the "nobility and gentry", Mayall admitted that he was "not unmindful of the fact . . . that moderate charges are as necessary as general excellence to ensure extensive public patronage." Mayall charged £1.1s for a set of 12 carte de visite portraits and £5.5s for his "highly finished" coloured portrait photographs.

In 1880 he transferred his business to Bond Street, London.

== Personal life ==
On 19 February 1869 his son, John Junior, became the first person to cycle from London to Brighton. The Times reported his sixteen-hour ride, "An Extraordinary Velocipede Feat" the following day.

Mayall's wife Eliza died in Brighton in 1870. The following year, on 14 December 1871 at St George's Bloomsbury, he married Celia Victoria Hooper (1838–1922), widow of timber merchant Henry Morgan Hooper and daughter of surgeon William Gardner. This marriage produced three further children: Elsie Lena (born 1872), Oswald (born 1874) and Sibyl (born 1876).

Mayall was declared bankrupt in September 1885 with liabilities of £22,916 12s. Id., to creditors in the form of mortgages on various freehold properties, which he was unable to rent or sell without a loss, and also shares in the Albert Palace Company, and in the ship Brighton, which he valued at £600. The failure of his business was attributed in part to the cost of fitting his premises in Bond street with electricity. In April 1888 his business was bought out for £34,000 by H. S. King and the Artistic Works Association Ltd. through which he became Managing Director of Mayall and Company on a 5-year contract and a fixed salary.

Mayall died 13 years later, aged 88, on 6 March 1901 at Southwick, West Sussex. He was buried on 19 March 1901 at Lancing, West Sussex.

== Cultural references ==
Scenes of Mayall taking painter J.M.W.Turner's daguerreotype portrait, alone and together with his companion Mrs. Booth, appear in the film Mr. Turner.

== Gallery ==
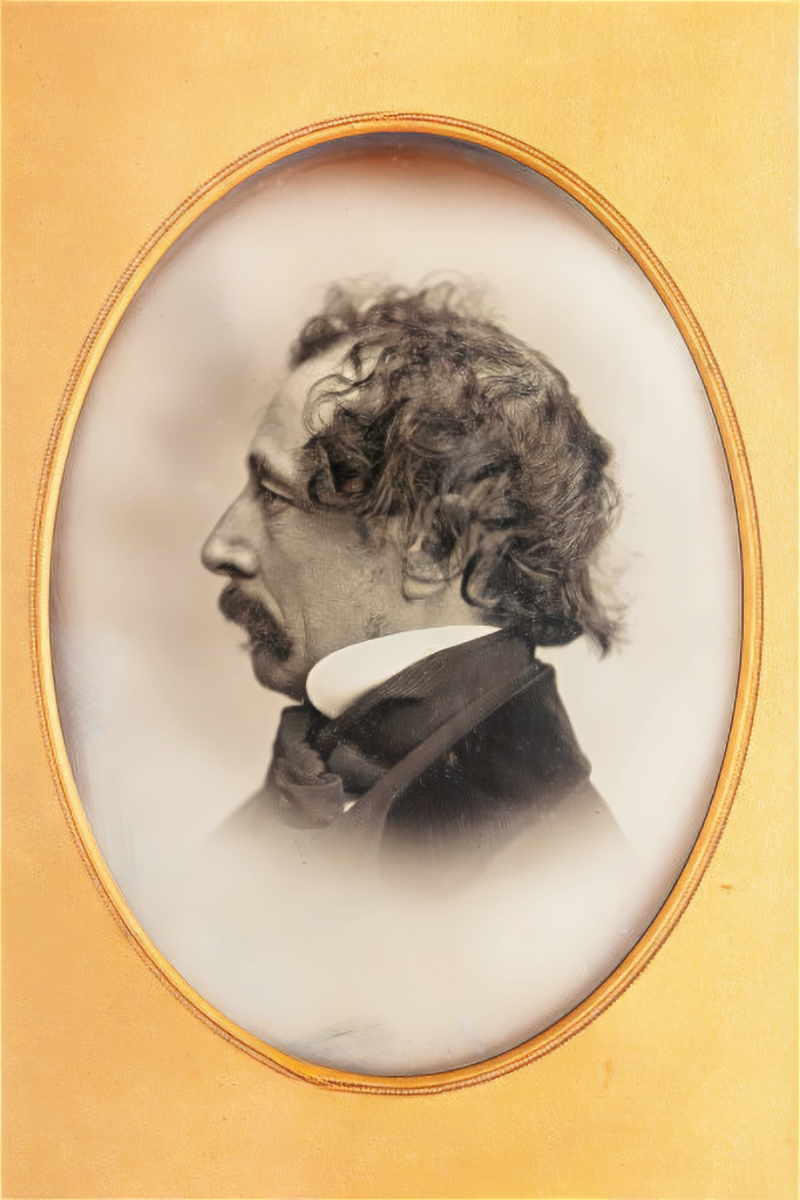
Charles Dickens (c. 1853–55)

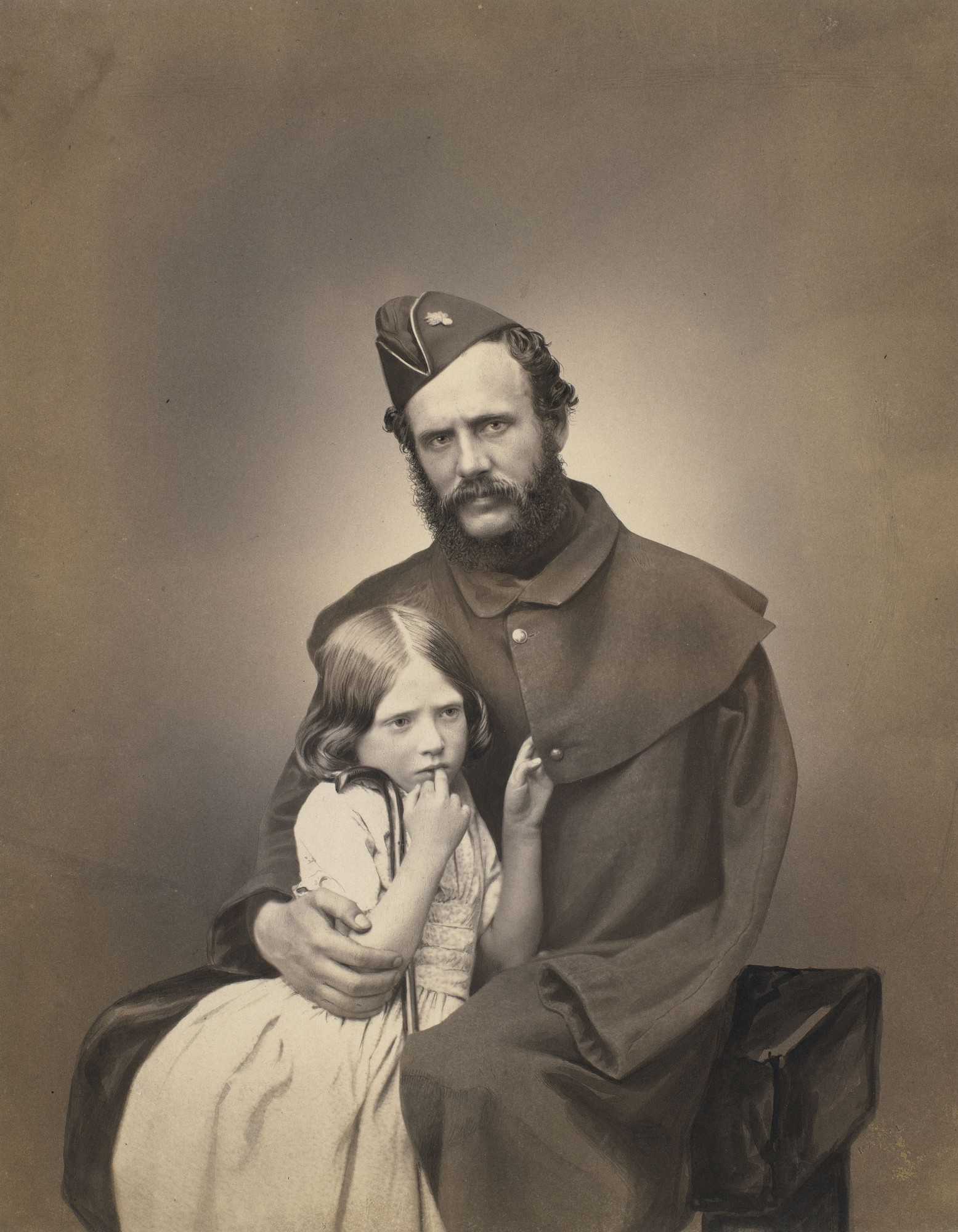
Sergeant Dawson and His Daughter (1855)

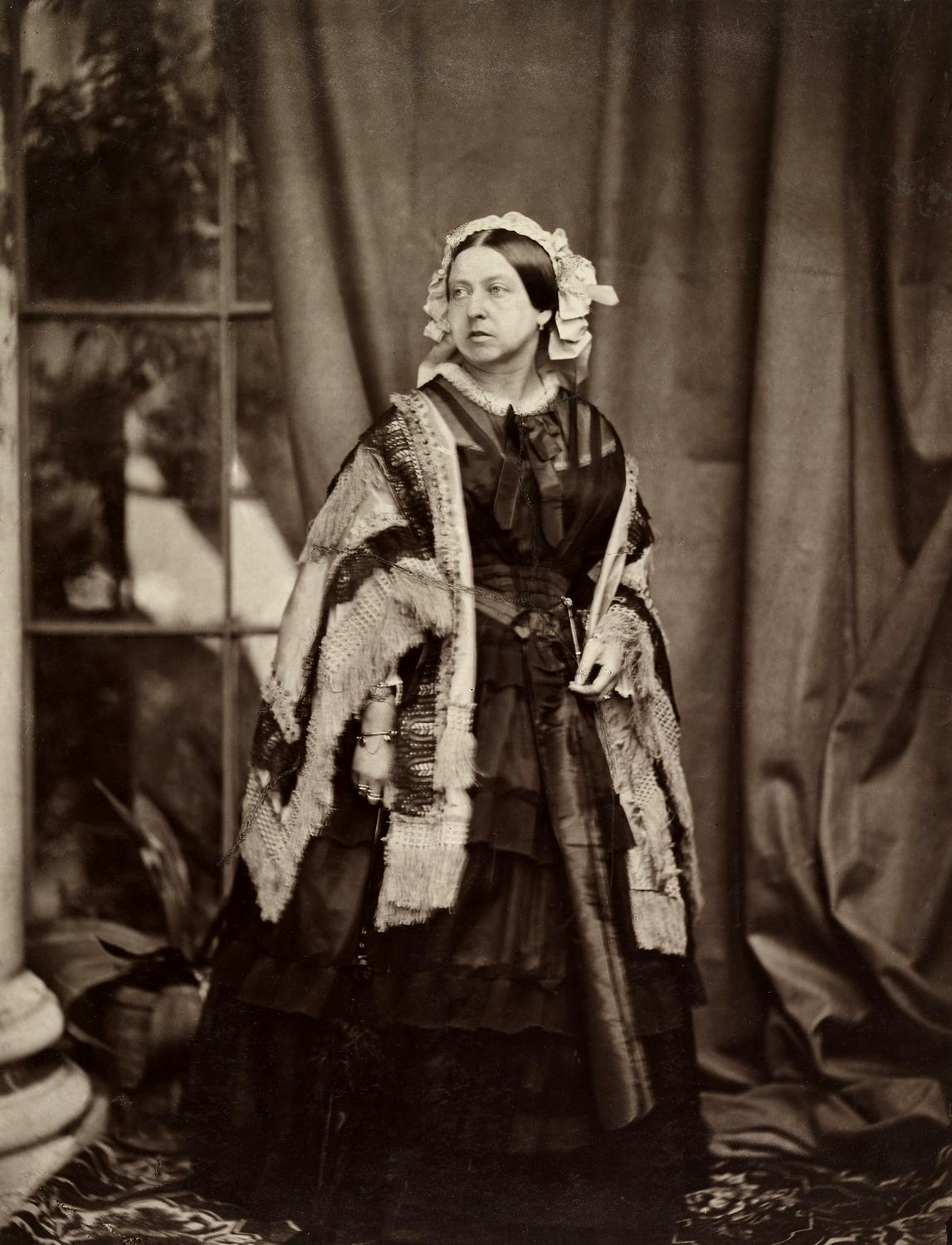
Queen Victoria (1860)

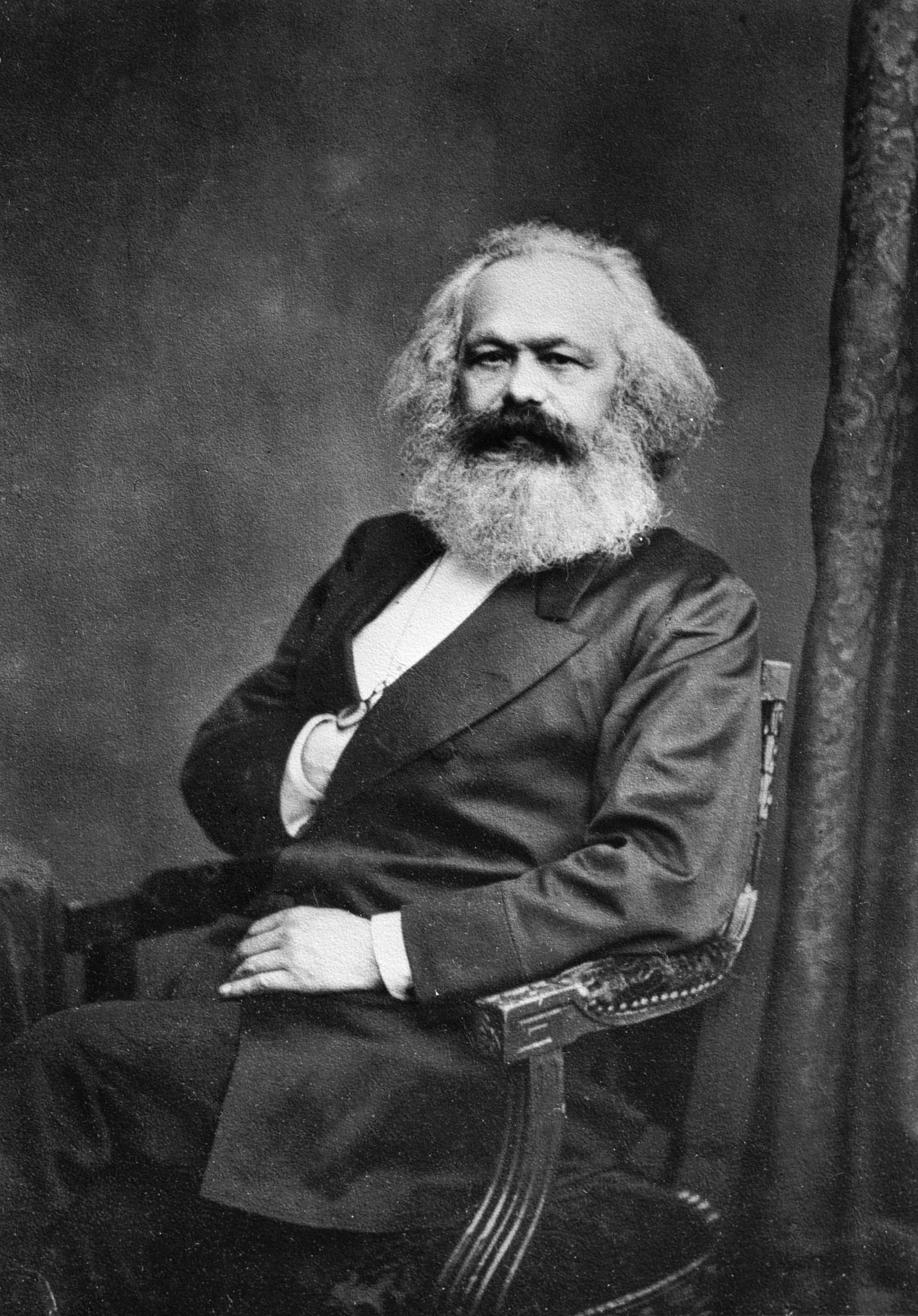
Karl Marx (1875)

== Publications ==
- Mayall, J. E. (1860). The Royal album: portraits of the royal family of England. London: A. Marion. OCLC 40818532.
- Mayall J. E. 1867. Mayall's Celebrities of the London Stage : A Series of Photographic Portraits in Character. London: Messrs. A. Marion Son.
- Mayall, J.E.; Pound (Engraver), Daniel J. (1859). The drawing-room portrait gallery of eminent personages : principally from photographs by Mayall in Her Majesty's private collection, and from the studios of the most celebrated photographers in the Kingdom. London: The London Joint Stock Newspaper Co. OCLC 1250378270.
- Tennyson, Alfred; Mayall, J.E.; Stodart, George J. (1884). The works of Alfred Tennyson poet laureate. London: Macmillan and Co. OCLC 5318210.
- Roffe, William; Crew, John J.; Mayall, J. E.; Collins, Joseph; Watkins, John; Bonnar, W.; Horsburgh, J.; Uwins, Thomas; Rolls, Charles (1875). Gibbon, Charles (ed.). The casquet of literature : being a selection in poetry and prose from the works of the most admired authors. London, Melbourne: Blackie & Son. OCLC 499988817.
