= Gestapo Informer Recognized by a Woman She Had Denounced =

1945 photograph by Henri Cartier-Bresson

Gestapo Informer Recognized by a Woman She Had Denounced (1945)

Gestapo Informer Recognized by a Woman She Had Denounced, full title Gestapo Informer Recognized by a Woman She Had Denounced, Deportation Camp, Dessau, Germany, is a black and white photograph taken by Henri Cartier-Bresson in 1945. It is one of the most famous post-World War II pictures.

== History and description ==
While working for the French Army's film and photography unit, Cartier-Bresson was caught by the Germans and became a prisoner of war in June 1940. In 1943, his third escape attempt was successful, and with the help of forged papers, he managed to flee to France.

After the end of World War II in Europe, in May 1945, he was assigned by the American Office of War Information to do a documentary about French prisoners of war and refugees, which would be Le Retour. This picture was taken at the Dessau deportation camp, in East Germany, recently liberated by the Soviet and American armies, and which was being used as a shelter for displaced people, forced workers, political and war prisoners, and refugees.

The dramatic picture documents the moment when a Belgian woman who had been a Nazi collaborator as a Gestapo informer, and was identified before she could hide in the crowd, is publicly identified by another woman as the one who denounced her. She rushes from the crowd to do that and stands angry and defiant to her left (the photograph's right side) while the alleged informer lowers her head in shame. The camp commandant and interrogator sits calmly at a writing desk as he witnesses the scene. A crowd at the background witnesses the dramatic event, including a man in "stryped pyjamas" who looks defiantly at the left. The identity of the two women is unknown but the man seated at the desk was Wilhelm Heinrich van der Velden, a young Dutchman nominated by the Americans to that position, who had been recently liberated from the Westerbork Camp, in the Netherlands. This particular scene is absent from the documentary.

== Public collections ==
There are prints of this photograph at the International Center of Photography, in New York, the Minneapolis Institute of Art, in Minneapolis, and the Art Gallery of South Australia, in Adelaide.
