= Leonard McCombe =

Leonard McCombe FRPS
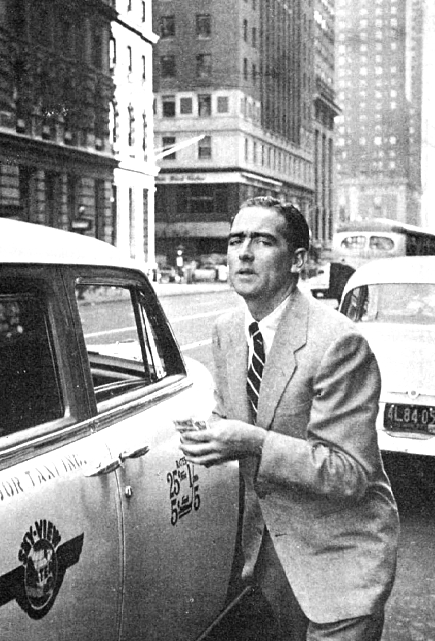
- Leonard McCombe, in New York 1954, Photograph taken by Jun Miki
- Born: 1 June 1923; Isle of Man, British Isles
- Died: 2015 (aged 91–92)
- Education: Slade School of Fine Art
- Known for: Photography

Leonard James McCombe FRPS (1 June 1923 – 2015) was a Manx-born American war photographer and photojournalist who worked for Picture Post and Life.

== Life and work ==
McCombe was born on 1 June 1923 on the Isle of Man, and grew up in Port Erin.

He became a professional photographer working on the Isle of Man at the age of 16. He moved to England to work for Picture Post from 1943 to 1945, covering the allied advance across Europe to Berlin.

In 1941, he joined the Royal Photographic Society (RPS) as a junior member. He became an Associate (Note: The term is explained in "Associate (ARPS)". Royal Photographic Society.) of the RPS in 1943 and a Fellow (Note: The term is explained in "Fellowship (FRPS)". Royal Photographic Society.) in 1944. At the time he was probably "the youngest Fellow in the history of the Royal Photographic Society".

He moved to the United States and started working for Life at the age of 22 in 1945. He continued to work for the magazine until its closure in 1972.

While working for Life, McCombe produced his most notable work, "Career Girl: Her Life and Problems" (3 May 1948), which documented the life of 23-year-old Gwyned Filling, "a young college girl trying to make a start on an advertising career in New York". McCombe's photograph for Life (22 August 1949) of cowboy Clarence Hailey Long inspired advertising agency Leo Burnett to create the Marlboro Man advertising campaign.

Of his process, McCombe stated:

This is the way it usually happens. You come in cold to an unfamiliar situation, where nobody knows you. The scenes you had imagined often turn out to be non-existent. "What's going on?" you ask yourself. "Where's my story?" It's like being on the outside of a shop window looking in. Somehow, you have to break through the glass.

== Personal life ==
With his wife, Gertrude, McCombe started the Gertrude and Leonard McCombe Foundation for wellness and cancer treatment. (Note: The foundation's website is here.) Gertrude was diagnosed with ovarian cancer in 2014. Whilst caring for his wife, Leonard himself deteriorated, with suspected mesothelioma. He died in 2015, and Gertrude died in 2018.
