= Landscape photography =

Photography genre

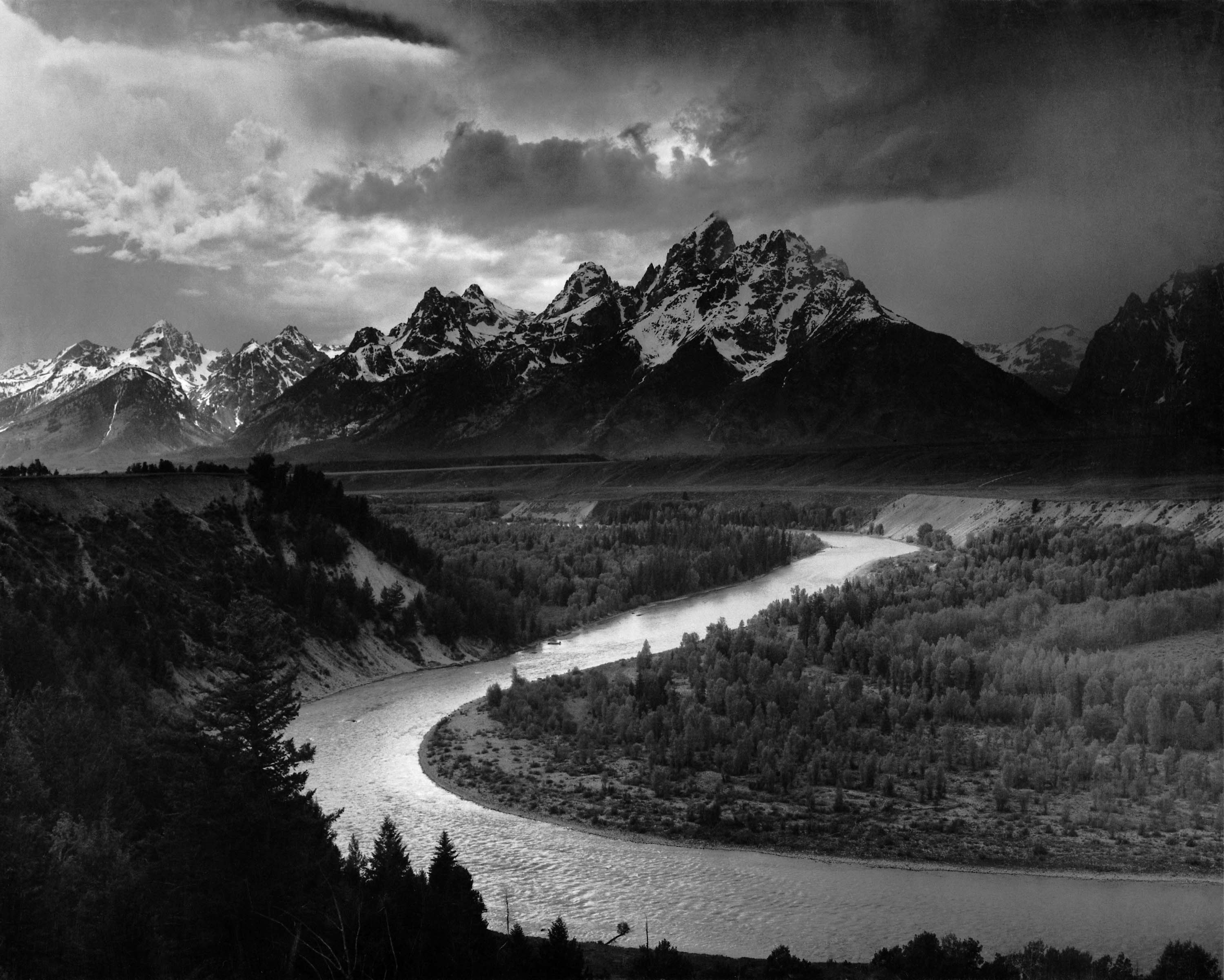
The Tetons and the Snake River (1942) by Ansel Adams

Landscape photography (often shortened to landscape photos) captures the world's outdoor spaces, sometimes vast and unending and other times microscopic. Landscape photographs typically capture the presence of nature but can also focus on human-made features or disturbances of the land; when applied to cities and the built environment, this approach is commonly referred to as urban landscape photography. Landscape photography is created for a variety of reasons, one of the most common being capturing the experience of the outdoors.

Many landscape photographs show little to no human activity and are created in the pursuit of a pure, unsullied depiction of nature that is devoid of human influence. These types of landscape photographs often feature subjects such as landforms, bodies of water, weather events, and natural light. Other landscape photographs focus on human interventions in the landscape. The definition of a landscape photograph is therefore a broad concept that may include rural or urban settings, industrial areas, or nature photography.

== Environmentalism ==
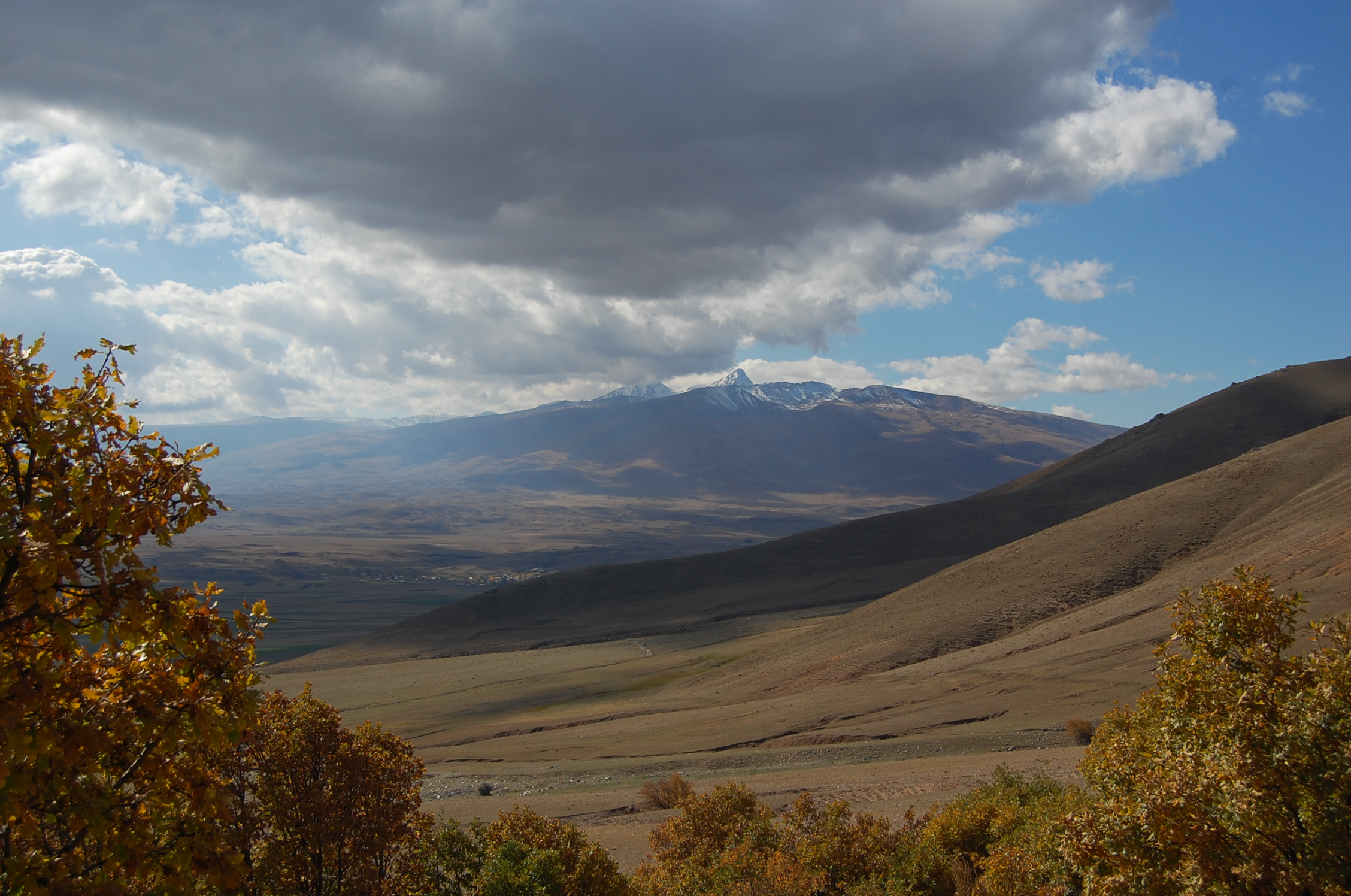
Photograph showing weather and distant mountains, Armenia (2008)

Some of the most important and celebrated landscape photographers have been motivated by an appreciation of the beauty of the natural environment and a desire to see it preserved. The work of William Henry Jackson in the mid-19th century was instrumental in convincing Congress in 1872 to create Yellowstone, the first national park in the United States. Photography produced by Philip Hyde for the Sierra Club was used extensively to promote the preservation of natural spaces in the Western United States during the 20th century. Renowned landscape photographer Ansel Adams received both a Conservation Service Award and a Presidential Medal of Freedom in recognition of his work's influence on wilderness preservation and raising awareness about environmentalism.

Canadian photographer Edward Burtynsky (b.1955) is acclaimed for his photographs of human-altered landscapes. His work highlights environmental concerns and, through the sublime grandeur characteristic of his images, Burtynsky investigates the impact humans have had on the environment. His subjects include mountain ranges, railways, abandoned mines, rural homesteads, quarries, and oil fields. While photographing subjects such as these, Burtynsky balances compelling aesthetics with the realities of damaged landscapes created through the harmful practices of industrialization.

== Subjects ==
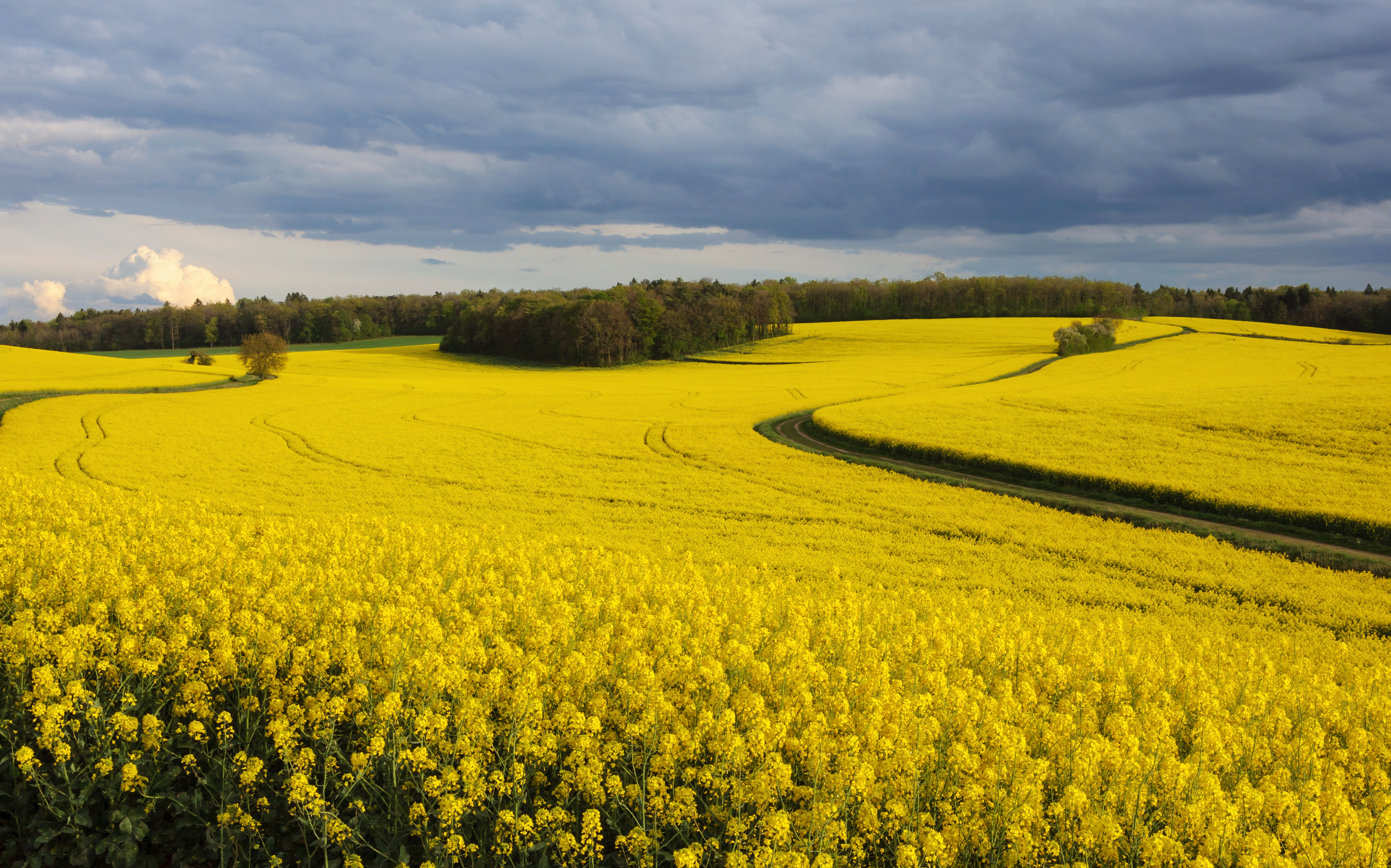
Farm landscape, in this case a rapeseed field in France

Landscape photography commonly involves daylight photography of natural features of land, sky and waters, at a distance—though some landscapes may involve subjects in a scenic setting nearby, even close-up, and sometimes at night.

Photography of artificial scenery, such as farm fields, orchards, gardens and architecture, may be considered "landscape" photography as well. Even the presence of human-made structures (buildings, roads and bridges, etc.) or art (such as sculpture) may be considered "landscape" if presented in artistic settings or appearing (or photographed) in artistic style.

Further, landscape photography is typically of relatively stationary subjects—arguably a form of "still life". This tends to simplify the task, as opposed to photography of kinetic or live subjects. However, landscape photography often overlaps the activity of wildlife photography and the two terms are used somewhat interchangeably; both wildlife and landscapes may be elements of the same picture or body of work.

== Tourism ==
Landscape photography has become a big part of local economies throughout the world. Countries such as Scotland, Iceland, Faroe Islands, New Zealand, USA, Canada and countries in the European Alpine region are very popular with photography tourists and welcome people from all over the world. As a result of this, landscape photography workshops and tours have become big business in these countries. Apps have formed part of this experience telling users how to find the most popular locations and how to photograph them once there.

== Methods (technical) ==
Landscape photography typically requires relatively simple photographic equipment, though more sophisticated equipment can give a wider range of possibilities to the art. An artist's eye for the subject can yield attractive and impressive results even with modest equipment.

=== Camera ===
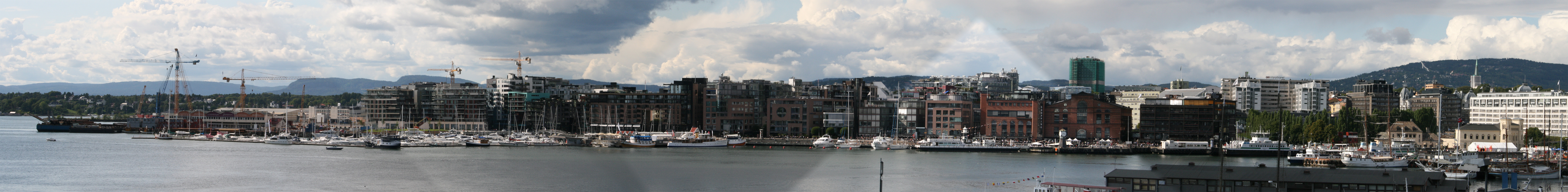
Panoramic view of Oslo cityscape

Any ordinary (or sophisticated) camera—film camera or digital camera—can be readily used for common landscape photography. Higher-resolution and larger-format digital cameras (or larger-format film cameras) permit a greater amount of detail and a wider range of artistic presentation.

However, a larger-format camera yields a more limited depth of field (range of the scene that is in focus) for a given aperture value, requiring greater care in focusing (see: "Shutter Speed and Aperture", below).

A camera with "panorama" function or frame can permit very wide images suitable for capturing a panoramic view.

=== Lens ===
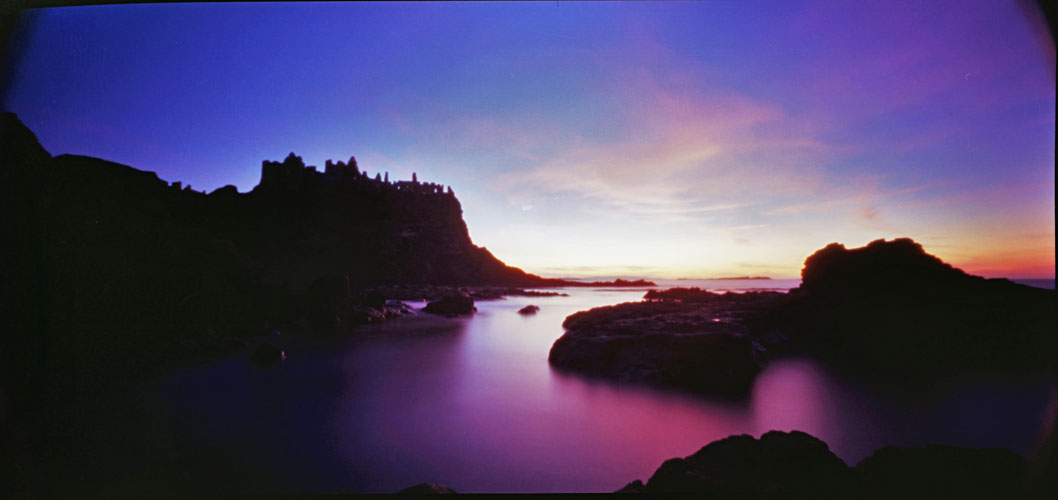
20 minute exposure with no lens (pinhole camera)

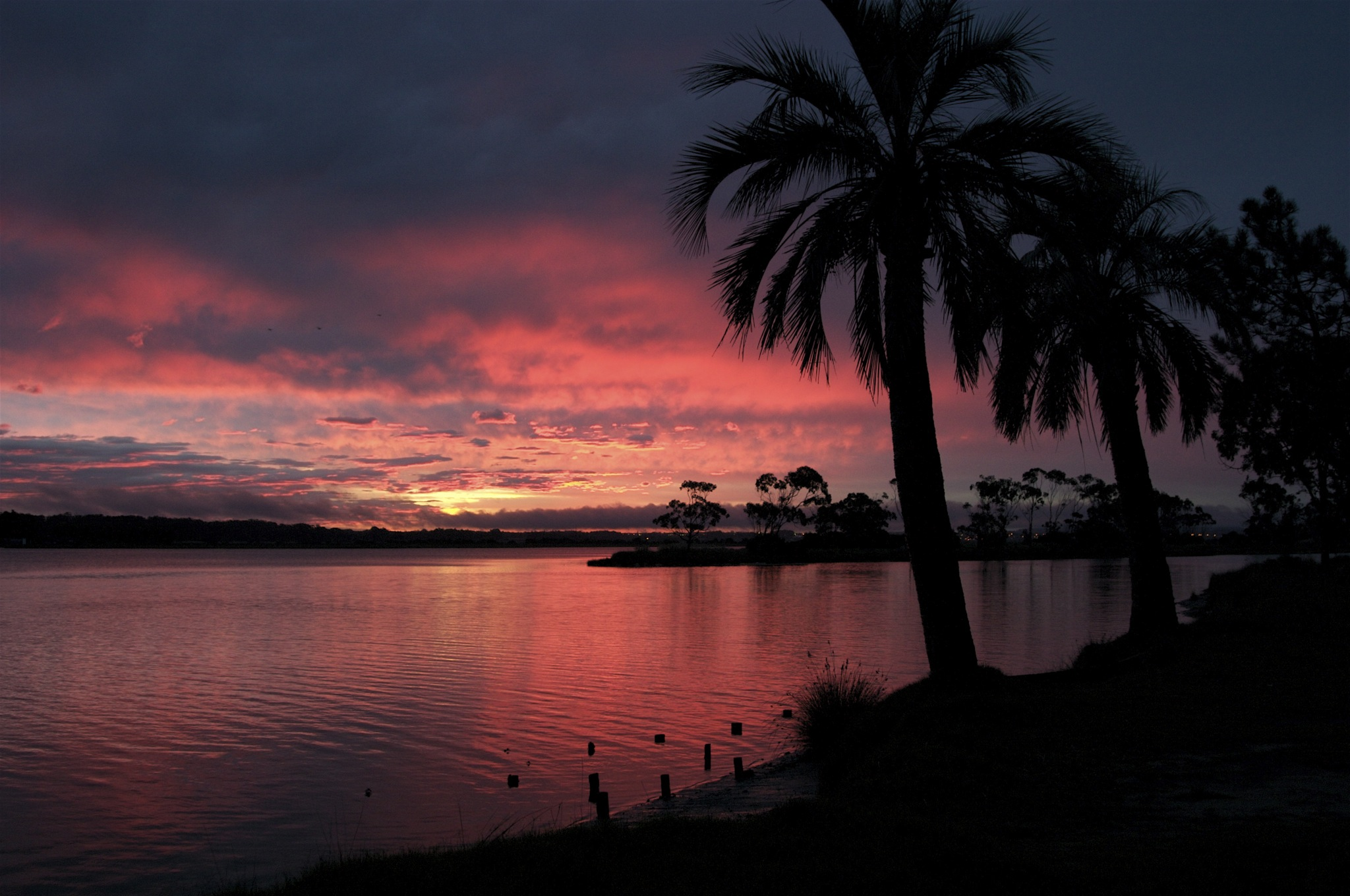
Use of light at sunset

For "wide open spaces", a wide-angle lens is generally the preferred lens, allowing a broad angle of view. However, medium-range to telephoto lenses can achieve satisfying imagery, as well, and can enable the capture of detailed scenery of smaller areas at greater distances. Telephoto lenses can also facilitate limited ranges of focus, to enable the photographer to emphasize a specific area, at a fairly specific distance, in sharp focus, with the foreground and background blurred (see: depth of field). A big difference between a wide-angles lens and a telephoto lens is the compression of the landscape; the wider the angle the more distance will appear between the foreground and background elements; however, a telephoto lens will make the same elements appear closer to each other. Other lenses that can help include the fisheye lens for extremely wide angles and dramatic effect, and the macro/micro lens for extreme close-up work. While variable-range zoom lenses are widely used, some landscape photographers prefer fixed-range prime lenses to provide higher clarity and quality in the image.

=== Medium: film or digital sensor ===
The sensitivity to light, of the medium—the film or the digital camera sensor—is important in landscape photography, especially where great detail is required. In bright daylight, a "slow film" (low-ISO film), or low-ISO digital camera sensor sensitivity setting (typically ISO 100, or perhaps 200), is generally preferred, allowing maximum precision and evenness of image.

However, if there is movement in the scene, and the scene is in lower light—as with cloudy days, twilight, night, or in shaded areas—a higher ISO (up to the limits of the film or camera sensor, depending upon the shortage of light) may be desirable, to ensure that fast shutter speeds can be used to "freeze" the motion.

=== Lighting and flash ===
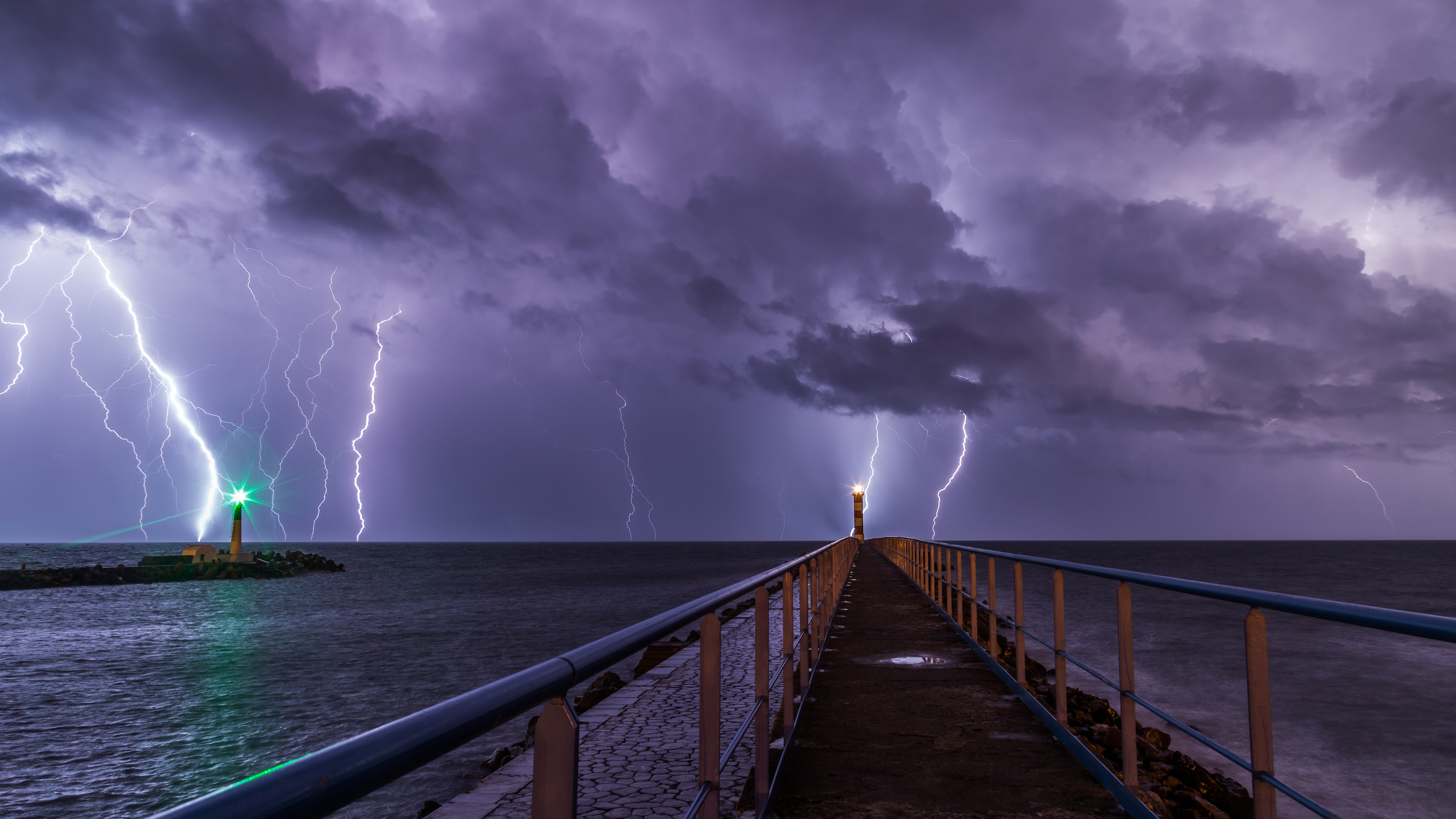
Ocean at night - 383 second exposure

Normally, landscape photography—being focused primarily on natural beauty—tends to be done with only naturally occurring ambient light.

In some cases, however, artificial light is recommended or unavoidable. Careful use of flash, continuous artificial lighting or reflective surfaces (e.g.: reflectors) for "fill" in shadowy areas is often used in close-up landscape photography (e.g.: garden spaces, small areas of dark forests, etc.).

However, given the broad expanses of open space that tend to dominate in landscape photography, artificial lighting is typically ineffective, or even destructive (causing the foreground to be wildly over-lit, and the background to become overly dark).

Light at dawn or dusk, or just before or after those times (especially at sunrise, or during the "golden hour" just before sunset), is often considered the best for capturing detail, showing scenes in the best colors of light, or otherwise generating impressive and attractive images.

=== Shutter speed and aperture ===
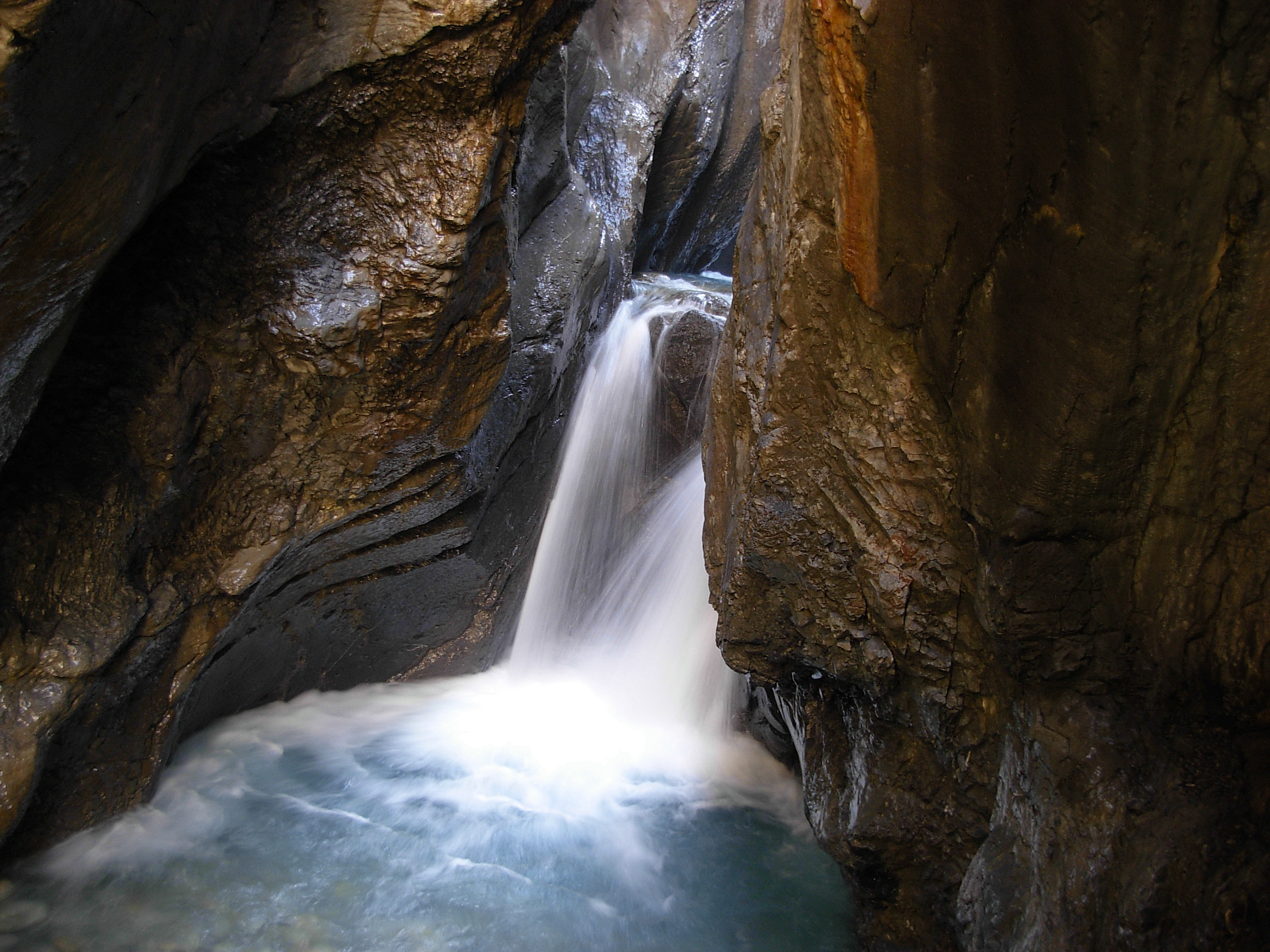
Moving water - shutter speed 1/4 second

With cameras that allow a variety of shutter speeds and lens apertures, landscape photographers tend to prefer settings that allow all of the viewed area to be in sharp focus. This typically requires a small aperture (a high f-stop, usually between 11 and 13 is best for clarity and depth of field), which creates only a small hole for the light to come into the camera from the lens, ensuring that as much of the field of view is in focus as possible (see: depth of field).

With a small aperture, however, a slower shutter speed (longer exposure) may be required to compensate for the limited amount of light squeezing in through the small aperture. This can be a problem if there are kinetic elements in the picture, such as moving animals (especially birds), people or vehicles. It can also be a problem if the environment is kinetic (in motion), such as wind blowing and shaking all the trees and plants in the scene, or if water is flowing. Slow shutter speeds can also be a problem if the photographer is in motion (such as shooting a scene from a moving vehicle).

Consequently, some compromise between shutter speed and aperture may be necessary, or advisable. To some extent, a higher-ISO film or digital camera setting can compensate without the need to alter shutter speed or aperture. However, higher ISO settings ("fast film") can result in grainy pictures and poor capture of details, especially at a distance.

In some cases, a slow shutter speed is desired to show movement of the subjects, particularly moving water or the effects of wind.

=== Filters ===
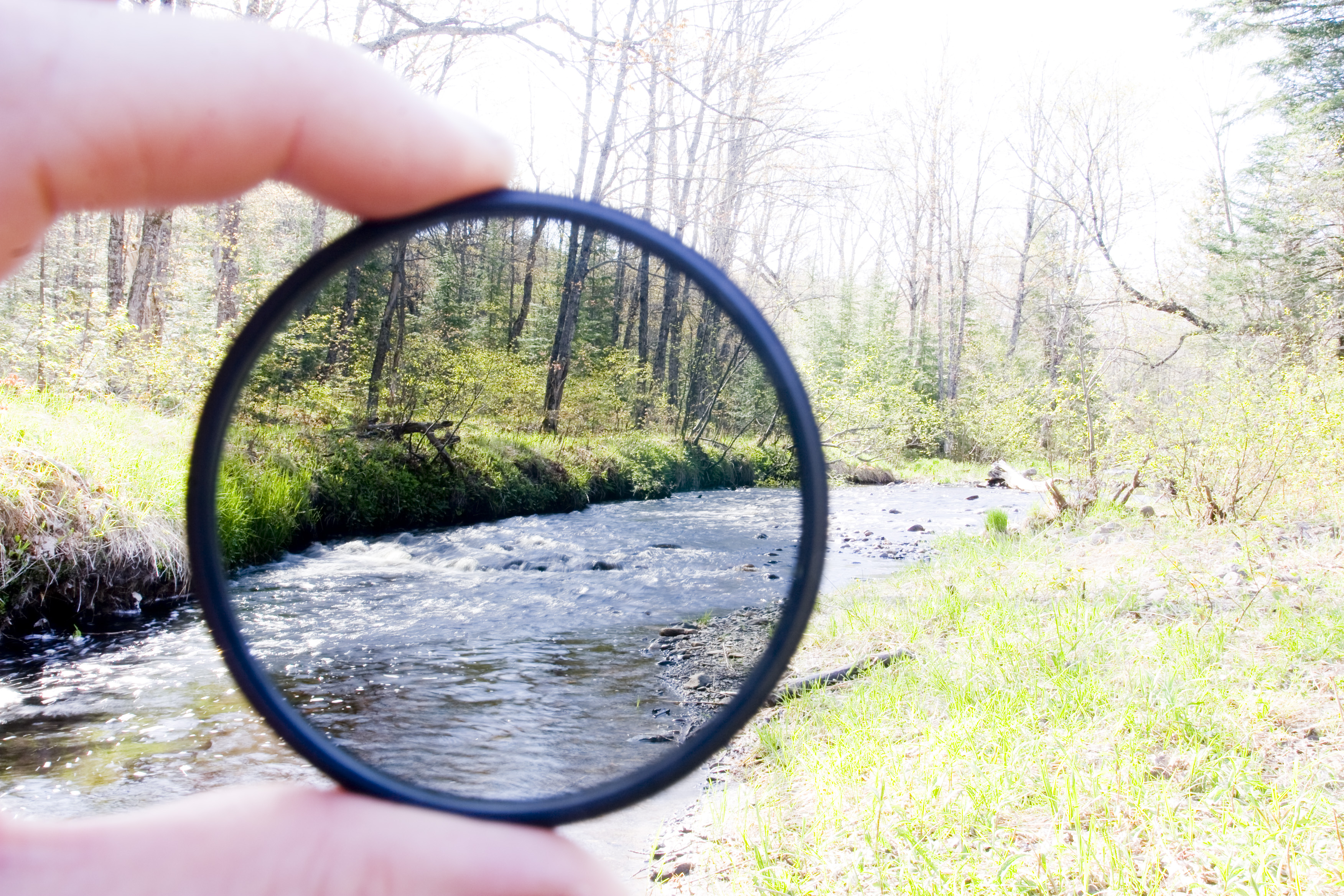
Neutral density filter demonstration. Photo taken with shutter speed 1/5 of a second and a focal length of 21mm.

Filters can serve a wide range of purposes in landscape photography.

For instance, a polarizing filter can darken the sky, while allowing surface features to be shown in relatively sharper clarity. Polarizing filters also help with cutting glare from water reducing reflections, snow and ice—even facilitating greater transparency of water and ice.

Neutral density filters are darkened with a neutral (colorless) gray tint which reduces the amount of light entering the camera lens. These filters are used to lengthen shutter speeds without the need to alter aperture or film/sensor sensitivity, or alternatively, to use large apertures without exceeding the maximum shutter speed of a camera. A variation of this filter, termed the graduated neutral density filter or simply 'ND grad', transitions from dark, neutral gray on one side to clear on the opposite side. Photographers use these filters to lower natural contrasts by reducing light transmission from the brightest portion of the subject landscape, while letting light from the darker portion of the landscape enter the lens unobstructed.

UV-Zero haze filters reduce "purple fringing" caused by ultraviolet light, especially in digital situations. They are also recommended by some professional photographers as protection for the vulnerable lens, especially when outdoors or in dynamic situations.

Color filters can create other effects, or compensate for the appearance of unnatural lighting due to camera characteristics.

=== Other accommodations ===
Camera tripod

In order to mitigate shaking associated with hand-holding a camera, landscape photography oftentimes requires a firm camera footing which affords the potential for sharper imagery. Tripods are specifically designed for stabilizing cameras and are widely regarded as essential equipment for landscape photography. However, any firm surface unaffected by vibration, wind or human contact may offer similar benefits. The use of a timer, remote control or cable release allows the shutter to be tripped without the introduction of vibration that might result from manually depressing the shutter button.

Some modern, high-quality cameras also provide image stabilization, which compensates for vibration by moving inner workings of the camera, or electronically correcting the photograph.

Because landscape photography is normally outdoors photography, protection from the elements can be helpful. Shooting from inside a sheltering structure or stationary vehicle (engine off, occupants stationary) can be helpful. Use of an umbrella or other shield to keep camera and photographer dry can also be helpful. A waterproof container for the camera, with drying agent inside (e.g.: dry cloth) may be advised, and experts advise that the camera should be shielded from blowing dust, snow, and rain, and extremely harsh direct sunlight.

== See also ==
- Aerial photography
- Edward Burtynsky
- Landscape painting
- Nature photographers
- North American Nature Photography Association
- Underwater photography
