= Juvisy, France =

Photograph by Henri Cartier-Bresson

Juvisy, France (1938) by Henri Cartier-Bresson

Juvisy, France, with the French title of Dimanche sur les Bords de Marne, Juvisy (Sunday at the Banks of Marne, Juvisy), is a black and white photograph taken by Henri Cartier-Bresson in 1938. The picture shows his influence and formation in painting and went to become one of his most known photographs.

== History and description ==
Cartier-Bresson was commissioned by the leftist newspaper Ce Soir, of Paris, to do a photographic work documenting the ongoing workers movement to achieve more vacations time. The current photograph wasn't eventually published in the newspaper but still reached an iconic status among his work.

The photograph demonstrates the artist influence of painting, depicting a scene typical of the impressionist school. It was taken from a high point of view and depicts two couples, with towels, food and wine, seated on the banks of the river Marne, at Summertime, while picnicking. The man in the highest point fills a cup of wine, while the other three people face the river, where a boat lies quietly. The picture has a kind of cascading effect as it looks down the four people as they face the boat in the river.

Art historian Bonnie L. Grad's essay on the photograph in the volume "Contemporary Masterworks" juxtaposes the photographer's lessons from painting with his commitment to the "decisive moment," a concept that he wrote about that caused some critics to overlook the careful composition of his candid photos. However, she notes that despite the apparent casualness of Cartier-Bresson's photos, the "unified, integrated composition" of this view, and in his work in general, has led to comparisons to the art of Edgar Degas.

== Public collections ==
There are prints of the photograph at the Museum of Modern Art, in New York, The Art Institute of Chicago, and the National Gallery of Victoria, in Melbourne.
