= Heinz Kluetmeier =

American photographer (1942–2025)

- Born: October 1, 1942; Berlin, Germany
- Died: January 14, 2025 (aged 82); New York City, U.S.
- Occupation: Photojournalist
- Organizations: Sports Illustrated
- Awards: Lucie Award

Heinz Kluetmeier (October 1, 1942 – January 14, 2025) was a sports photographer for Sports Illustrated. He covered every Olympic Games for the magazine since the 1972 Munich games except one. Kluetmeier was best known for his photo at the end of the Miracle on Ice game, which ran on the cover of Sports Illustrated without any caption. He has over 100 Sports Illustrated cover photographs to his credits.

Kluetmeier served two stints as the magazine's director of photography and received the Lucie Award for outstanding achievement in sports photography in October 2007. Kluetmeier was inducted into the International Swimming Hall of Fame in 2017.

== Life and career ==
=== Early life ===
Kluetmeier was born in Berlin on October 1, 1942. He was raised in Bremen, and at age nine, moved with his family to Milwaukee, Wisconsin, in 1952. He attended Custer High School in Milwaukee, where he was a varsity swimmer and captain of the tennis team. By age 15, Kluetmeier was working as a freelance photographer for The Associated Press, and covered the Green Bay Packers and the 1960 presidential campaign.

He attended Dartmouth College as an engineering major at the urging of his father, who "never believed that photography would develop into a career". Kluetmeier shot photographs for Dartmouth athletics and campus events and for the AP's Boston bureau, and continued to freelance in Milwaukee during the summers.

After graduating from Dartmouth in 1965, he worked for two years with Inland Steel, and then a year and a half at The Milwaukee Journal. In 1969, Kluetmeier joined the staff at Time Inc. as a photographer for Life and Sports Illustrated.

=== Sports Illustrated ===
Kluetmeier covered his first Olympic Games for Sports Illustrated at the 1972 Munich games, and served twice as the magazine's director of photography. He was the magazine's senior staff photographer.

Kluetmeier's best known SI work is the March 3, 1980, cover that shows the American hockey team celebrating its win over the Soviet Union in the "Miracle on Ice" game at the 1980 Winter Olympic Games at Lake Placid, New York. The cover is the only one in the magazine's history to run without a headline or caption, because, in his words, "It didn't need it. Everyone in America knew what happened."

He also created new techniques and gadgets to create his shots. At the 1980 Moscow Olympics, Kluetmeier devised a way to use a remotely operated camera near the race finish line. He successfully caught the face of Sebastian Coe as he won the 1,500-meter race. Kluetmeier was the only photographer to place a remote camera, but "Now," he said in 1996, '"You go to the Olympics and there are like 50 remotes at the finish line."

In 1983, he cowrote the book Sports Illustrated Golf, with Mark Mulvoy.

Kluetmeier covered the 1984 Winter Olympic Games in Sarajevo, including the ski jumping events at Mt. Igman.

During the 1991 World Aquatics Championships, he became the first photographer to place a camera underwater to capture swimming events. He did so again the next year at the 1992 Summer Olympics. Sixteen years later at the 2008 Beijing games, Kluetmeier operated an underwater camera that showed the final second of the 100-meter butterfly race. The photographs in sequence showed Michael Phelps touching the wall before Milorad Čavić, even as Čavić appeared to win the race from above water.

=== Illness and death ===
Kluetmeier had Parkinson's disease and a stroke, and died of complications at his home in Manhattan, New York City on January 14, 2025, at the age of 82.
