= The Tetons and the Snake River =

1942 photograph by Ansel Adams

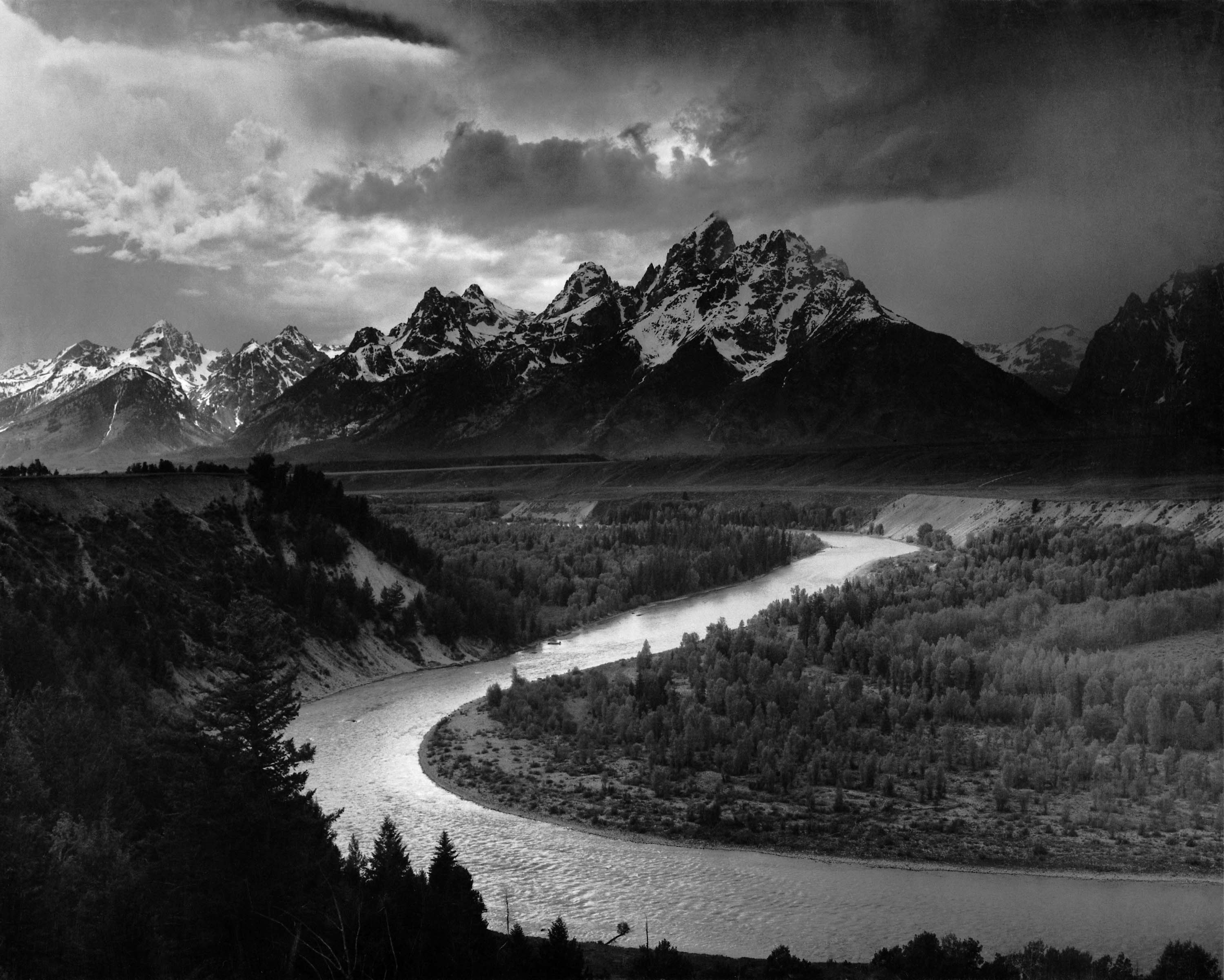
The Tetons and the Snake River (1942)

The Tetons and the Snake River is a black and white photograph taken by Ansel Adams in 1942, at the Grand Teton National Park, in Wyoming. It is one of his best known and most critically acclaimed photographs.

== Analysis ==
The picture was taken from an elevated point of view and depicts the Snake River in a mountainous valley. The dramatically lit black-and-white photograph depicts a large river, which snakes from the bottom right to the center left of the picture. Dark evergreen trees cover the steep left bank of the river, and lighter deciduous trees cover the right. In the top half of the frame, there is a tall mountain range, dark but clearly covered in snow. The sky is overcast in parts, but only partly cloudy in others, and the sun shines through to illuminate the scene and reflect off the river in these places.

== Art market ==
A mural-sized print of this photograph was sold for $988,000 at Sotheby's New York, on December 14, 2020, the highest price ever reached by an Ansel Adams work.

== In collections ==
There are prints of this picture in the collections of several art museums, including the National Gallery of Art, Washington, D.C., the Philadelphia Museum of Art, the J. Paul Getty Museum, Los Angeles, and the University of Michigan Museum of Art, in Ann Arbor.

The photograph was also encoded into the grooves of the Voyager Golden Record, two time capsules launched in 1977 and sent into interstellar space by NASA.

== See also ==
- List of photographs considered the most important
