= Bill Eppridge =

American photographer and photojournalist

- Born: William E. Eppridge; March 20, 1938; Buenos Aires, Argentina
- Died: October 3, 2013 (aged 75); Danbury, Connecticut, United States
- Occupations: Photographer, photojournalist
- Years active: 1960s–2013

William E. Eppridge (March 20, 1938 − October 3, 2013) was an American photographer and photojournalist for Life magazine, known for his photography of the dying Robert F. Kennedy, taken in June 1968.

Eppridge was born in Buenos Aires, Argentina on March 20, 1938, and grew up in Richmond, Virginia, Nashville, Tennessee, and Wilmington, Delaware.

Eppridge died of pneumonia caused by a sepsis infection on October 3, 2013, aged 75, at the Danbury Hospital in Danbury, Connecticut.
