= Popperfoto =

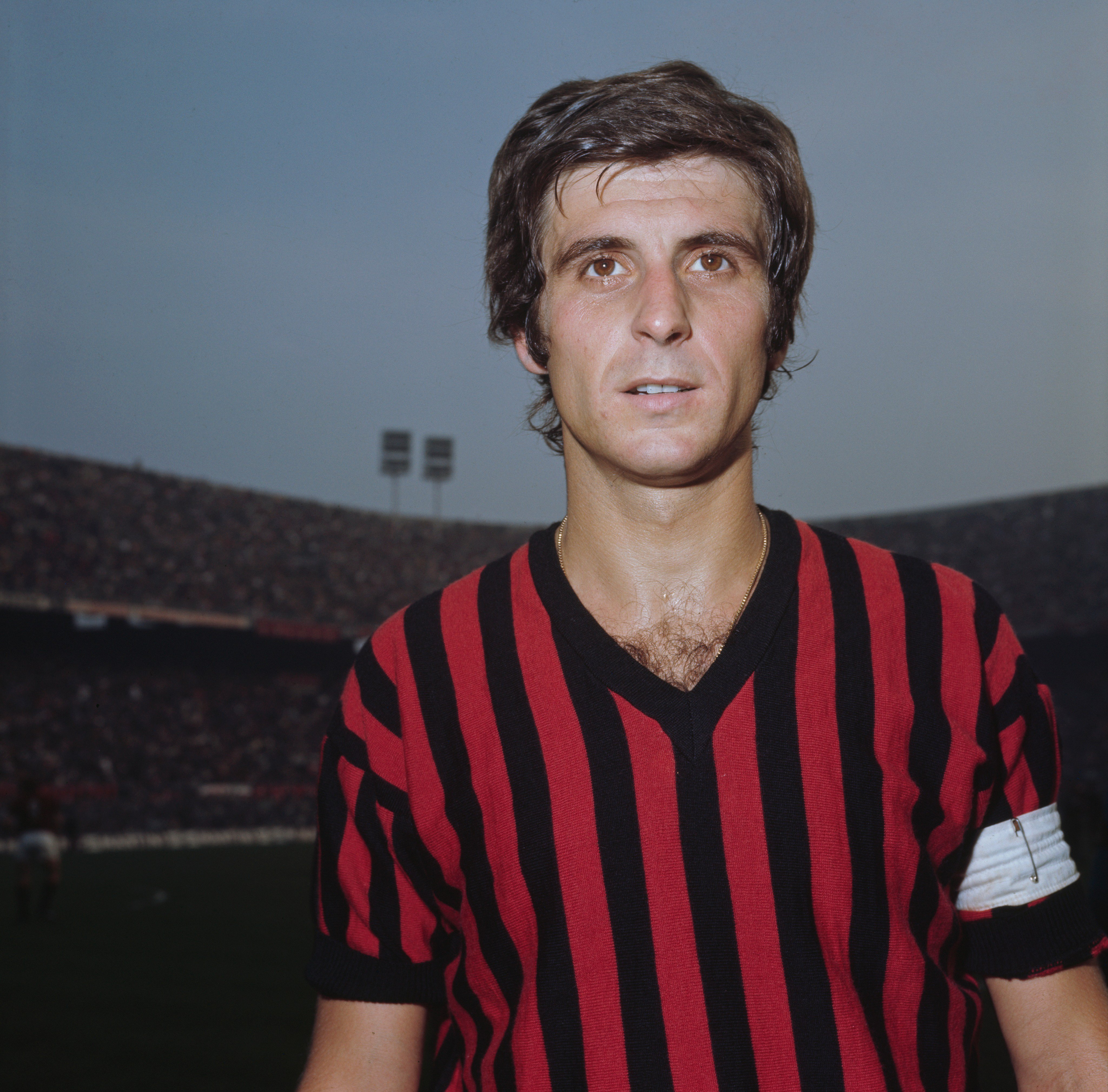
1971 simple photograph of Italian footballer Gianni Rivera, an example of a member of the Popperfoto collection which has fallen into the public domain.

Popperfoto is one of the largest and oldest image archives in Europe, owned by Paul Popper Ltd. It is licensed and marketed through Getty Images.

== History ==
Popperfoto was founded in 1934 by the Jewish photojournalist Paul Popper, who came from the Czech Republic and emigrated from Berlin to London. The archive contains more than 12 million monochrome photographs and more than 750,000 color photos spanning 150 years. The content of the collection ranges from documentation of historical events to photographs of personalities from politics, sports and entertainment to collections of various topics. Some of the most important images in the collection include the original negatives from Herbert Ponting's photographic record of Antarctic explorer Robert Falcon Scott's 1910–1912 Antarctic voyage, as well as color photographs of the front lines in various areas of World War II.

Paul Popper Limited is the rightsholder of the Popperfoto collection. Bob Thomas is the current director of the business, based in Moulton Park, Northampton, England.

== License acquisition by Getty Images ==
In 2006, the media licensor Getty Images negotiated marketing and licensing control of the collection, whilst it exclusively markets the collection, it is still privately owned and independently administered.
