= Bliss (photograph) =

Default wallpaper of Windows XP

- The Bliss wallpaper

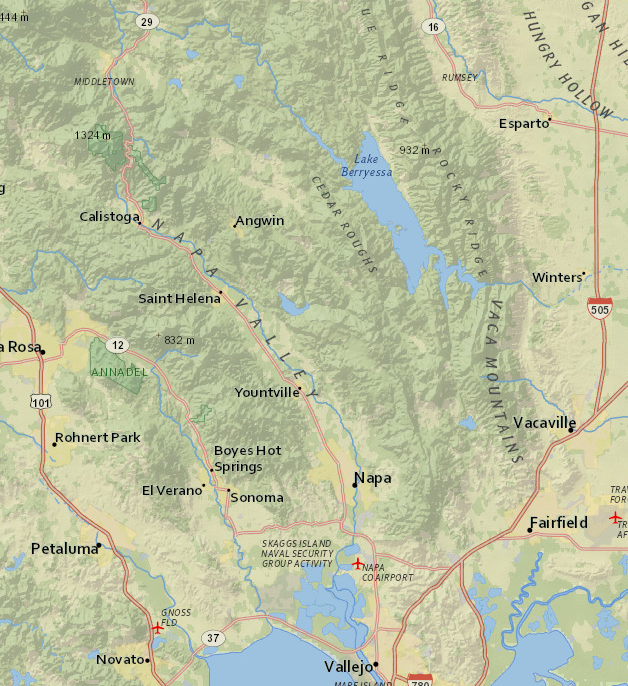
- Location within Napa County
- Artist: Charles O'Rear
- Year: January 1996
- Medium: Landscape photography
- Location: Sonoma County, California, United States; 38°15′00.5″N 122°24′38.9″W
- Owner: Microsoft

Bliss, originally titled Bucolic Green Hills, is the default wallpaper of Microsoft's Windows XP operating system. It is a photograph of green rolling hills and daytime sky with cirrus clouds. Charles O'Rear, a former National Geographic photographer, took the photo in January 1996 near the Napa–Sonoma county line, California, after a phylloxera infestation forced vineyards to be cleared from the hill years prior. He used a Mamiya RZ67 camera and Fujifilm's Velvia film to create the photograph; O'Rear remarked that he did not enhance or manipulate the photograph.

Initially a stock photo available through his photo agency Westlight that was acquired by Bill Gates's Corbis in 1998, Microsoft obtained full rights of the photograph in 2000 and then used it to promote Windows XP. Bliss received positive reception from reviewers, and has been speculated to be the most viewed photograph in history by Microsoft and journalists. Microsoft has reused the photograph in several promotions since the release of Windows XP. Photographers have attempted to re-create the iconic image, but the rolling hill has since become a vineyard again.

== Overview ==
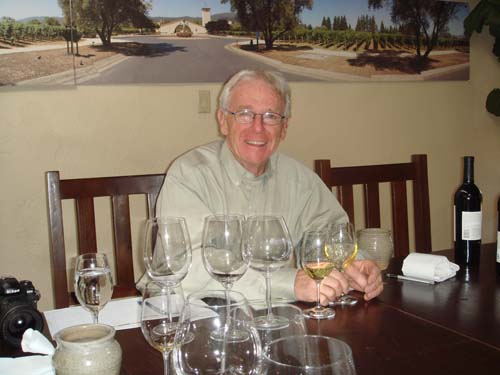
Charles O'Rear (pictured in 2007) is the photographer of Bliss.

The photograph depicts a lush green rolling hill with cirrus clouds during a daytime sky, with mountains far in the background. It was taken by Charles O'Rear, a former National Geographic photographer and resident of St. Helena, California, in the Napa Valley region north of San Francisco, while on his way to visit his girlfriend in January 1996. He drove along the Sonoma Highway, California State Route 121 intersecting 12, when he noticed the hill, which had been cleared of vineyards after a phylloxera infestation years prior. O'Rear came to a stop in southern Sonoma County, near the Napa–Sonoma county line and pulled off the road.

O'Rear recalled that he was alert for a photo opportunity the day he took the photograph, considering that a storm had passed over and winter rains left the hills green. "There it was! My God, the grass is perfect! It's green! The sun is out; there's some clouds," he remembered thinking. He took four shots and got back into his truck.

O'Rear used a Mamiya RZ67 medium-format camera on a tripod and Fujifilm's Velvia color film that saturated green and blue colors. He credited the combination and said that if he had shot with 35 mm film, it would not have had an identical result. O'Rear later recollected that he had previously attempted to capture the Napa Valley hills with the Kodachrome 64 film, but was dissatisfied due to the unsaturated greens. Despite being widely believed that the photograph was manipulated or created with software such as Adobe Photoshop, O'Rear said that he did not digitally enhance or manipulate the photograph in any way.

== History ==
After creating the photograph, O'Rear made it available as a stock photo through Westlight, a photo agency he co-founded. Westlight was bought by Seattle-based Corbis (now BENlabs) in May 1998, who digitized its best-selling images. By the time of its acquisition, Westlight was estimated to have been one of the largest stock photo companies in the United States. He also submitted a vertical shot, which was available at the same time. The photograph was originally titled Bucolic Green Hills.

In 2000, Microsoft's Windows XP development team contacted O'Rear through Corbis, which he believes they used instead of their larger competitor Getty Images, also based in Seattle, because the former company was owned by Microsoft co-founder Bill Gates. "I have no idea what [they] were looking for," he recalled. "Were they looking for an image that was peaceful? Were they looking for an image that had no tension?" He said that he was unsure how Microsoft found the photograph. Microsoft chose the image because "it illustrates the experiences Microsoft strives to provide customers (freedom, possibility, calmness, warmth, etc.)", and the design ideas of Windows XP. XP marketing also used photos of hills and clouds, but the Microsoft branding team "wanted an image with ‘more grounding’ than the images of skies they had used in Windows 95. Also, the green grass and the blue sky fit perfectly with the two main colors in the branding scheme." Another image of O'Rear's, known as Red Moon Desert in Windows XP, was also considered to be the default wallpaper, but was changed due to testers comparing it to buttocks.

Microsoft said they wanted not just to license the image for use as Windows XP's default wallpaper, but to buy all the rights to it. They offered O'Rear what he says is the second-largest payment ever made to a photographer for a single image; however, he signed a confidentiality agreement and cannot disclose the exact amount. It has been reported to be "in the low six figures." O'Rear needed to send Microsoft the original film and sign the paperwork; however, when couriers and delivery services became aware of the value of the shipment, they declined since it was higher than their insurance would cover. Instead, Microsoft bought O'Rear a plane ticket and he personally delivered it to their offices in Seattle. "I don't think the engineers or anybody at Microsoft had any idea it would have the success it had," he said. After the rights to the photograph were bought by Microsoft, it was renamed Bliss and was chosen as the default wallpaper of the Luna visual style, the default graphical user interface of Windows XP. The image was used extensively by Microsoft for promoting Windows XP and their $200 million advertising campaign.

Since the origins of Bliss were not widely known after the release of Windows XP, there had been considerable speculation about where the landscape was. Some guesses have included locations in France, Ireland, Switzerland, New Zealand, Germany, and southeast Washington State. Dutch users believed the photograph was shot in Ireland since the image was named "Ireland" in the Dutch release of the software. O'Rear said that Microsoft also questioned him about the authenticity of the photograph several years after the release of Windows XP, with the developers saying that "most of us think it was Photoshopped." O'Rear is adamant that, other than Corbis's minor alterations to the digitized version, he did nothing to it in the darkroom, contrasting it with Ansel Adams's Monolith:

I didn't "create" this. I just happened to be there at the right moment and documented it. If you are Ansel Adams and you take a particular picture of Half Dome and want the light a certain way, you manipulate the light. He was famous for going into the darkroom and burning and dodging. Well, this is none of that.

== Reception ==
The photograph was positively received. David Clark of the British magazine Amateur Photographer commented on the aesthetic qualities of Bliss, saying that "critics might argue that the image is bland and lacks a point of interest, while supporters would say that its evocation of a bright, clear day in a beautiful landscape is itself the subject." He described the landscape as having surreal features and speculated that it was chosen by Microsoft because of its appeal and landscape. Writing for Digital Camera World, Hannah Rooke said that Bliss became a metaphor for peace, nostalgia, and natural charm. Wayne Freedman of ABC7 called it the contemporary version of Adams's Monolith photograph. Observing the sky in the photograph, cultural anthropologist Katrien Pype referred to it as "almost perfect."

In a journal, Pedagogical University of Kraków professor Marcin Kania referred to Bliss as "one of the most recognizable contemporary landscape photographs." Jacob Ridley of PC Gamer described Bliss as the "wallpaper that defines [all] Windows wallpapers," while Adrienne Vogt of Bustle said that the photograph became omnipresent with Microsoft. Writing for Sonoma Magazine, Meg McConahey added that a cult following emerged around the photograph. Shortly before Microsoft retired Windows XP in April 2014, news about the Bliss photograph escalated in popularity.

== Legacy ==
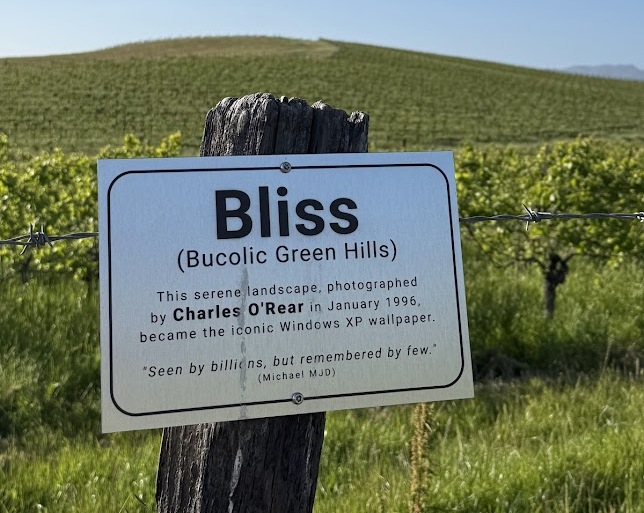
Today, a plaque marks the location of O'Rear's original image.

Due to the market success of Windows XP over the next decade, Microsoft and some journalists speculated that it might be the most viewed photograph in history. Cynthia Sweeney of Napa Valley Register estimated that the photograph has been seen by billions of people, while O'Rear estimated that Bliss has been seen on a billion computers worldwide, based on the number of copies of Windows XP sold since then. Regarding the one-billion estimation, he said that it is "an educated guess rather than a fully-accounted-for statistic."

After the release of Windows XP, Microsoft used Bliss in several promotions. In December 2001, a screensaver featuring Bliss was released, while in July 2021, a modified version of the photograph was added to Microsoft Teams as a background. They wrote that the modified version "shifted the shadows, softened the clouds, and added some dandelions." Microsoft later released a 4K resolution rendering of the background on their Microsoft Design website in June 2023. A limited-edition holiday sweater featuring Bliss was made available by Microsoft in November 2023 at the Xbox Gear Shop. The sales of the sweater were donated to The Nature Conservancy to combat climate change. In August 2025, Microsoft released limited edition versions of Crocs featuring Bliss.

O'Rear conceded that despite all the other photographs he took for National Geographic, he will probably be remembered most for Bliss. "Anybody now from age 15 on for the rest of their life will remember this photograph," he said in 2014. O'Rear framed a photograph of Bliss in his home. After the release of Windows 7 in 2009, O'Rear said that if asked, he would have provided more photographs to Microsoft. Prior to Microsoft retiring Windows XP in 2014, O'Rear was interviewed by them about the history of the photograph. In the interview, he said that he had hoped Microsoft would have contacted him for a Windows 8 wallpaper photograph. In a separate interview for The Sydney Morning Herald, O'Rear said that he regretted the deal he negotiated with Microsoft and wished that he had opted for a "fraction of a cent for every time it's seen" deal instead.

=== Re-creations ===
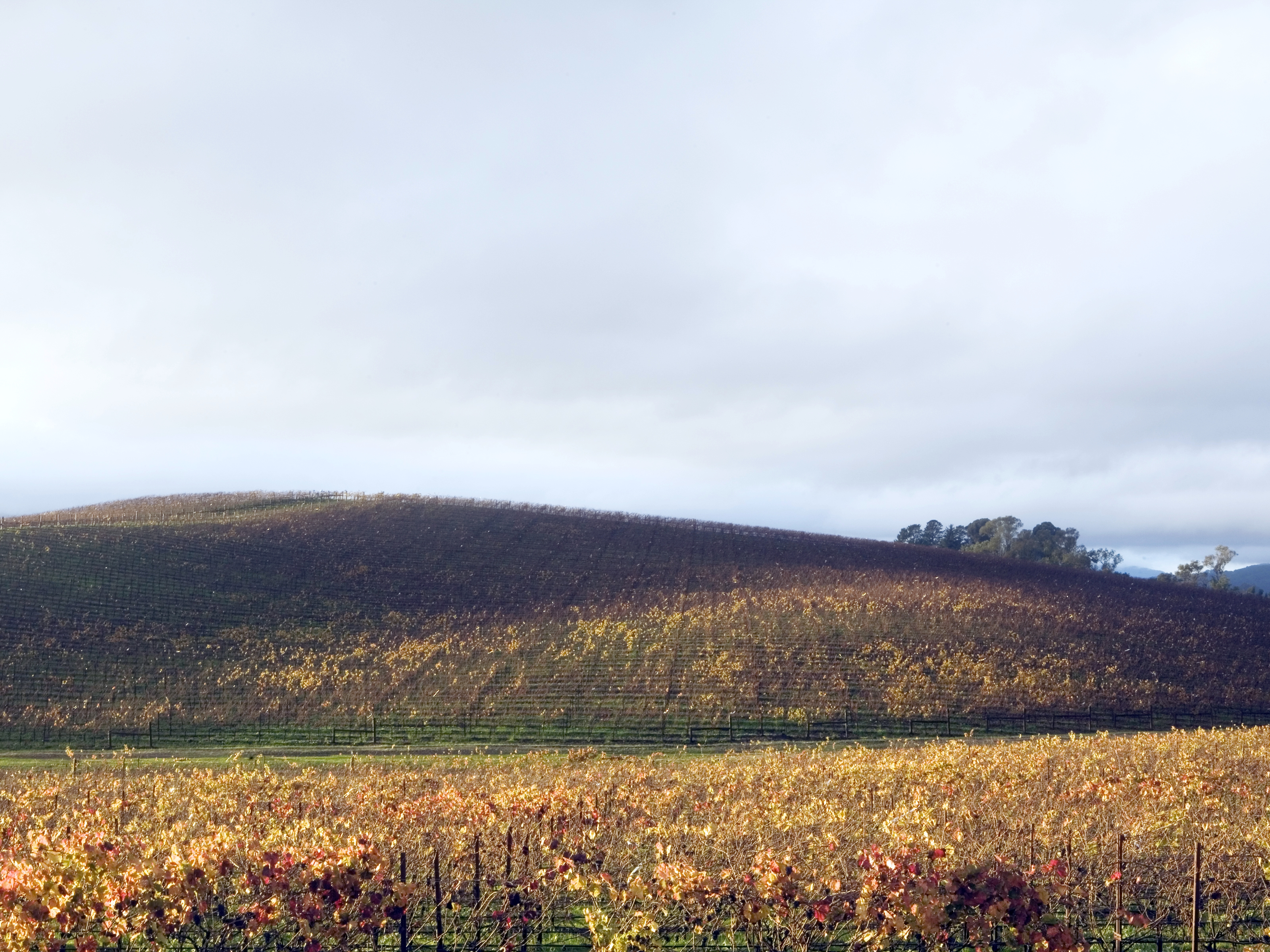
Bliss re-creation by Goldin+Senneby in November 2006, then covered by a vineyard

Before the photograph was bought by Microsoft in 2000, the hill returned to its previous state as a home to vineyards. Despite this, photographers have tried re-creating Bliss. The Goldin+Senneby duo visited the site in Sonoma Valley in November 2006, where Bliss was taken, re-photographing the same view now full of grapevines. Their work, titled After Microsoft, was created when the Luna theme was replaced by Aero in Windows Vista and also discussed the history of the photograph and its legacy after the phasing out of Windows XP's default theme. The duo said that they were attracted to the Bliss location due to it being "a backdrop to our lives in the front of the screen, as a kind of collective subconscious." Their work was exhibited at the gallery La Vitrine in Paris in 2007. Art historian Julian Myers-Szupinska said that with the return of vineyards, the Goldin+Senneby Bliss re-creation "loses its shine."

== See also ==
- List of photographs considered the most important
- Frutiger Aero – Design style and Internet aesthetic
