= Charles O'Rear =

American photographer (born 1941)

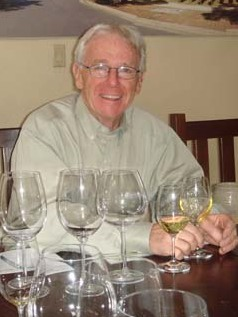
- O'Rear in 2007
- Born: November 26, 1941 (age 84); Butler, Missouri, U.S.
- Occupations: Photographer; author
- Years active: 1960–2020
- Notable work: Bliss
- Spouse: Daphne Larkin (m. 2001)

Charles O'Rear (born November 26, 1941) is an American retired photographer and author, known for photographing Bliss, the default wallpaper of Microsoft's Windows XP operating system, and for being a National Geographic photographer from 1971 to 1995.

O'Rear was born in Butler, Missouri, and developed an interest in photography at a young age. He started his career at the Butler Daily Democrat and later worked as a photographer for the Emporia Gazette, The Kansas City Star, and Los Angeles Times newspapers. He then worked as a freelancer for The New York Times and Western Airlines. O'Rear participated in the Environmental Protection Agency's Documerica project in the 1970s, where he is credited with the most photographs. He was hired by National Geographic in 1971, covering Old Believers, Napa Valley, and various international stories. He worked for the magazine until 1995 and is the only photographer to have appeared on its cover.

Following his Napa Valley assignment in 1978, O'Rear developed an interest in wine photography; relocated to St. Helena, California; and formed the Los Angeles-based stock photo agency Westlight in 1980. In January 1996, he captured a stock photo of a green rolling hill and cirrus clouds during a daytime sky in southern Sonoma County. After the acquisition of Westlight by Bill Gates's Corbis, O'Rear was approached by Microsoft, who offered to buy full rights to the photograph; they renamed it Bliss and chose it as the default wallpaper of Windows XP. Journalists have speculated it to be the most-viewed photograph in history. O'Rear continued to cover Napa Valley by authoring coffee table books and books about wines and vineyards with his wife, Daphne Larkin. The couple moved to Brevard, North Carolina, in 2017, and by 2020, O'Rear had retired.

== Early life ==
Charles O'Rear was born on November 26, 1941, in Butler, Missouri. His mother, a Humansville native, was a journalist, home economist, and social worker. O'Rear grew up in his home state and was interested in aircraft during his youth, obtaining a pilot license by the age of 16. During his elementary education, O'Rear participated in a shuffleboard competition in 1952 and authored his first newspaper article for the Bates County Democrat in 1955. He also worked as a sports reporter on behalf of Butler High School. He graduated from the school in 1959 and attended the Emporia State University, then known as Kansas State Teachers College, in the 1960s.

== Photographic career ==
Throughout his career, O'Rear photographed in all 50 states in the United States and 30 countries. Most of his photographs were shot in black-and-white with film cameras, though by 2014, he advocated for the use of digital cameras. O'Rear is a member of The Photo Society, a group of prominent magazine photographers.

=== Early career ===
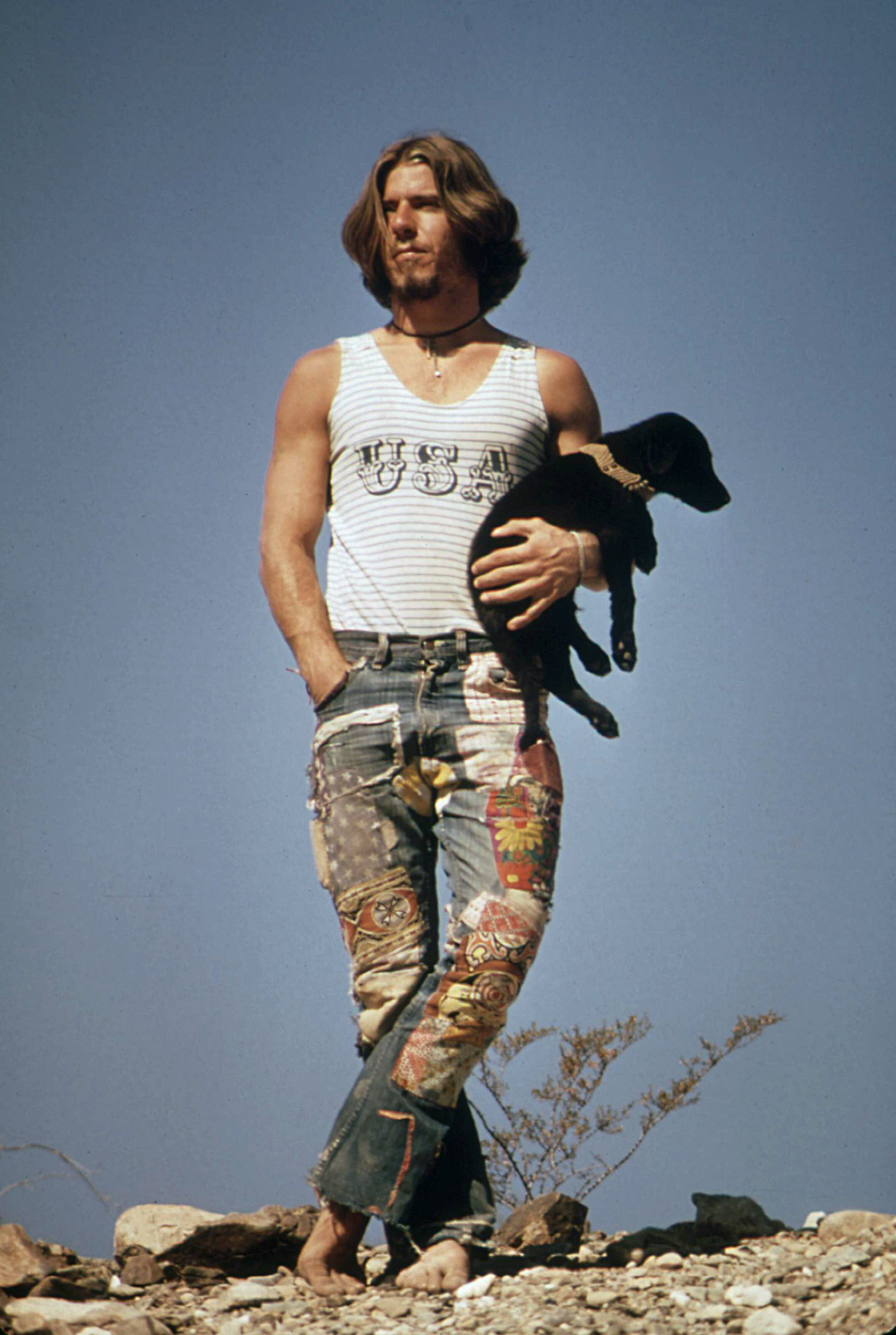
Hitchhiker With His Dog was one of the photographs O'Rear took as part of the Documerica project.

O'Rear has been interested in photography since he was ten years old, when he obtained a Kodak Brownie camera. He started his photographic career as a sports reporter for the Butler Daily Democrat. In 1960, he joined the daily newspaper Emporia Gazette as a photographer, during which the World Book Encyclopedia selected one of O'Rear's photographs of Kansas as its "Pictures of the Year" in 1961. A year later, in 1962, O'Rear joined The Kansas City Star as a reporter-photographer. During his time at The Kansas City Star, he covered stories about society and politics and was commissioned by Time as their Kansas City photographer. His role at the newspaper slowly changed to that of a photographer, as the editors were more satisfied with his photographs than with his writing. In 1966, he moved to Los Angeles to join as a staff photographer for the Los Angeles Times. He covered the first Super Bowl game for the newspaper but left the newspaper in 1968, after which he began working as a freelance photographer. During his time as a freelancer, he was hired as a photographer by The New York Times and Western Airlines.

From 1972 to 1977, O'Rear was part of the Environmental Protection Agency's Documerica project, aimed at "photographically documenting the subjects of environmental concern in America during the 1970s" along with 70 other photographers, including Bill Strode, Danny Lyon, and John H. White. O'Rear is credited with the most photographs in the final Documerica collection. He took photographs of Honolulu, Hawaii, Nebraska, Las Vegas, Arizona, California, and Hoover Dam on the Colorado River. C. Jerry Simmons of Prologue saw O'Rear's work in Nebraska as "a lasting snapshot of Midwest America". He noted that O'Rear's Hitchhiker With His Dog photograph from May 1972 was considered one of the most popular photographs from the Documerica project. Regarding his nature photographs, O'Rear showed the destruction of the environment "as a threat to the social future of the United States," according to historian Caleb Wellum.

=== National Geographic ===
The National Geographic magazine hired O'Rear in 1971 to document the lives of Old Believers, a group of Russian Eastern Orthodox Christians who live in Alaska. The magazine sent him to Napa Valley later that year, but the assignment was cut short considering that National Geographic did not yet cover alcohol in their magazine. O'Rear said that the National Geographic editors did not know that Napa Valley was a vineyard region. The magazine then tasked him with an assignment in Acapulco, Mexico, instead. When the magazine started covering wine, he was sent back to the Napa Valley in 1978 to photograph the vineyards. During his time at Napa Valley, O'Rear established connections with winemakers Robert and Margrit Mondavi. He became interested in wine photography after the assignment.

O'Rear was tasked by the magazine with covering international stories in the 1980s. During this period, he was one of the four winners of the 1984 AAAS Science Photography Contest. He traveled to Indonesia in 1985 on another assignment, during which he used 500 rolls of film and took over 15,000 photographs. O'Rear later recalled that his photographs from Indonesia, France, and Turkey are some of his favorite. He was also assigned with photographing at the Mexican Riviera and in Canada and Siberia. In 1993, O'Rear covered a story about bacteria in St. Helena, California.

O'Rear worked for National Geographic until 1995. He is the only photographer to ever appear on the magazine's cover, having appeared twice; on the cover of "The Chip: Electronic Mini Marvel That is Changing Your Life" in 1982, regarding microchip production in the Silicon Valley, and "The Bird Men," appearing as an aircraft pilot, in 1983. The photograph for "The Bird Men" was taken in North Dakota; he hoped that he would capture a pelican flying to their roost but was unsuccessful. He also recalled that he earned more than US$100,000 from his photographs after the 1982 story. While working with National Geographic, he learned to use small strobes and taught the subject at the Santa Fe Photographic Workshop.

=== Bliss and Corbis ===
Photographers like to become famous for pictures they created. I didn't 'create' this. I just happened to be there at the right moment and documented it.

— O'Rear on making Bliss

O'Rear co-founded Westlight, a Los Angeles-based photo agency, with photographer Craig Aurness in 1980. Westlight offered photographs that could have been bought or rented. While on his way to visit his girlfriend, Daphne Larkin, in Marin, O'Rear made a photograph of a lush green rolling hill and cirrus clouds during a daytime sky. The photograph was taken in January 1996. He recalled that he was looking for an opportunity to shoot a photograph that day, considering that a storm had passed over and winter rains had left the hill green. He drove along the Sonoma Highway, California State Route 121 intersecting 12, and came to a stop in southern Sonoma County. O'Rear used a Mamiya RZ67 medium-format camera and Fujifilm's Velvia color film to take the photograph. Despite being widely believed that the photograph was manipulated or created with software such as Adobe Photoshop, O'Rear said that he did not digitally enhance or manipulate the photograph in any way.

O'Rear made it available as a stock photo through Westlight, which was bought by Bill Gates' Corbis in May 1998. The photograph was initially titled Bucolic Green Hills. By the time of its acquisition, Westlight was estimated to have been one of the largest stock photo agencies in the United States. Corbis had previously hired O'Rear to photograph wine auctions in Burgundy in 1995, and after the acquisition, they digitized Westlight's images. Microsoft contacted O'Rear through Corbis in 2000, wanting to buy full rights to the photograph. O'Rear had to personally deliver the film to Microsoft in Seattle due to delivery services declining because of its high value. The Napa Valley Register reported that O'Rear was paid "in the low six figures". He had signed a confidentiality agreement and cannot disclose the exact amount. Microsoft renamed the photograph to Bliss and chose it as the default wallpaper of Windows XP. Another photograph of his, titled Red Moon Desert in Windows XP, was initially considered the default wallpaper.

Bliss received a positive reception after the release of Windows XP. Hannah Rooke of Digital Camera World said that the photograph became a metaphor for peace, nostalgia, and natural charm, while Wayne Freedman of KGO-TV called it the contemporary version of Ansel Adams' Monolith photograph. Because of Windows XP's success, journalists and Microsoft have speculated whether Bliss is the most-viewed photograph in history. O'Rear estimated that the photograph was seen on a billion computers worldwide. Meg McConahey of Sonoma Magazine said that a cult following emerged around the photograph. Microsoft used Bliss in several promotions after the release of Windows XP, notably adding a modified version of the photograph as a Microsoft Teams background in 2021 and featuring it on a limited-edition holiday sweater in November 2023.

=== After Bliss ===
O'Rear continued to work on covering Napa Valley after Bliss, publishing several coffee table books and books about different types of wines, as well as a book about Beringer Vineyards. He also launched a website dedicated to wine photography. In Napa Valley: The Land, the Wine, the People (2011), O'Rear covered vineyards in varied environmental conditions, vineyard history, wineries, and wine's presence in restaurants and excursions. He also discussed custom vehicle registration plates that included wine. Larkin contributed to the book by writing prose. The book also includes a photograph of Bliss, which Microsoft allowed O'Rear to include in the book.

In 2017, O'Rear was hired by Lufthansa to work on the "New Angles of America" project. He captured the Maroon Bells, the White Pocket in Arizona, and the Peek-A-Boo Slot in Utah. The photographs were made available as free wallpapers for mobile phones. By 2020, O'Rear had retired. In September 2023, The Transylvania Times named O'Rear the "Transylvanian of the Week" in recognition of his career accomplishments.

== Personal life ==
O'Rear is also known as Chuck. He has been married three times and has one child with his first wife, Mary Wright. He had another child with Wright in 1961 who died shortly after birth. After being sent to work in Napa Valley, O'Rear developed an interest in vineyards and ultimately relocated to St. Helena, California, during the 1980s. He had previously lived in an apartment and a condominium until purchasing a home in St. Helena in 1989. There he met Larkin, a journalist by profession, whom he married in June 2001. Together they own Wineviews Publishing, a book publishing company. The couple relocated to Brevard, North Carolina, in 2017. Their hobbies include hiking and swimming.

O'Rear is a conservationist who advocates for affordable housing. He also enjoys piloting rental aircraft. He is a user of Apple Inc. products.

== Bibliography ==
O'Rear has written, produced, and photographed books about wine and wine regions since 1989. He has worked with his wife on several books, including Wine Across America (2007) and Napa Valley: The Land, the Wine, the People (2011), and with designer Jenny Barry. Dan Berger of Los Angeles Times positively received O'Rear's 1990 book about Napa Valley, calling it "one of the most spectacular coffee-table books ever". Alfred Borcover of the Chicago Tribune recommended the book for fans of Napa Valley. Fred Tasker of Miami Herald positively received the Chardonnay: Photographs from Around the World book.

- High Tech: Windows to the Future (1st ed.). Intercontinental Publishing. 1985. ISBN 978-962-276-001-1.
- Napa Valley: Land of Vines and Wines. Wineviews Publishing. 1989. ISBN 978-0-9625227-2-7.
- Napa Valley (1st ed.). Collins Publishers. 1990. ISBN 978-0-00-215893-0.
- Cabernet: A Photographic Journey from Vine to Wine. Smithmark. 1998. ISBN 978-0-7651-0791-6.
- Chardonnay: Photographs from Around the World. Smithmark. 1999. ISBN 978-0-7651-1028-2.
- Wine Country: California's Napa & Sonoma Valleys. Compass American Guides. 2000. ISBN 978-0-679-00434-9.
- Napa Valley: The Land, the Wine, the People (2nd ed.). Ten Speed Press. 2001. ISBN 978-1-58008-322-5.
- Beautiful Wineries of Wine Country. Ten Speed Press. 2004. ISBN 978-1-58008-640-0.
- Wine Places: The Land, the Wine, the People. Mitchell Beazley. 2005. ISBN 978-1-84533-112-2.
- California Wine Country. Fodor's Travel Publications. 2007. ISBN 978-1-4000-1783-6.
- Wine Across America: A Photographic Road Trip. Wineviews Publishing. 2007. ISBN 978-0-9625227-6-5.
- The Rhine House, Beringer Vineyards: Napa Valley's Historic Estate. Wineviews Publishing. 2009. ISBN 978-0-9625227-7-2.
- Napa Valley: The Land, the Wine, the People (3rd ed.). Wineviews Publishing. 2011. ISBN 978-0-9625227-0-3.
