= Portaledge =

Deployable platform in big wall climbing

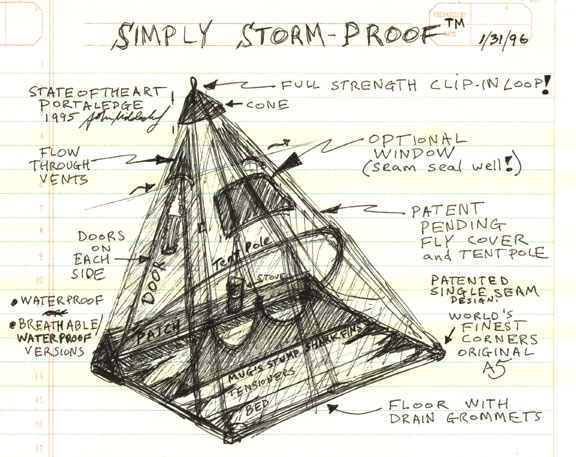
A5 Portaledge

A portaledge is a deployable hanging tent system designed for rock climbers who need to spend multiple days and nights on a climbing route suspended from a sheer rock face while big wall climbing. A fully assembled portaledge is a fabric-covered platform surrounded by a metal frame that hangs from a single anchor point via carabiners and has adjustable suspension straps. A separate cover—called a stormfly—covers the entire system to give protection in the event of bad weather. The first portaledges were created for climbing in Yosemite.

== History ==
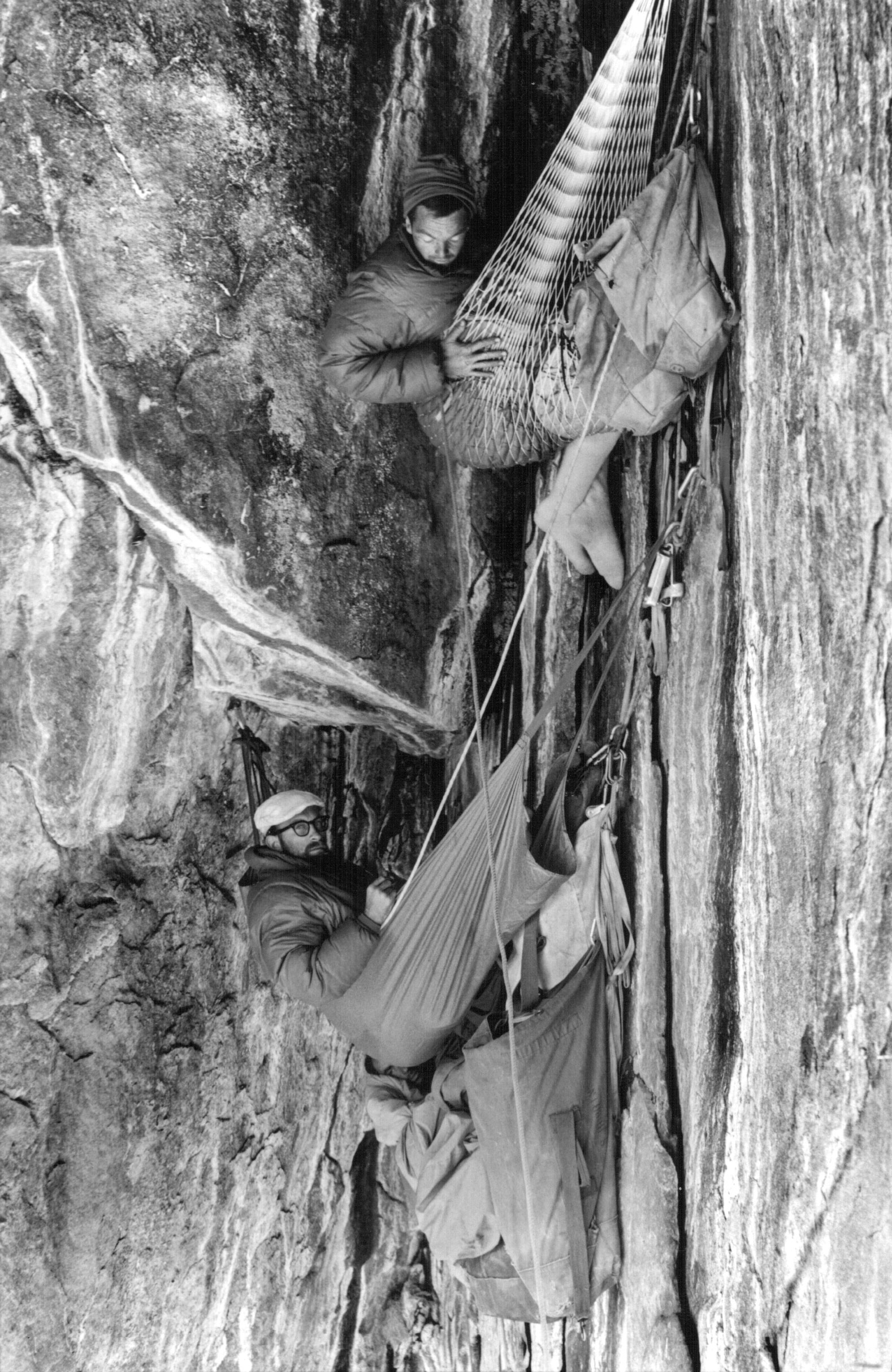
Hammocks were used by climbers before portaledges were developed.

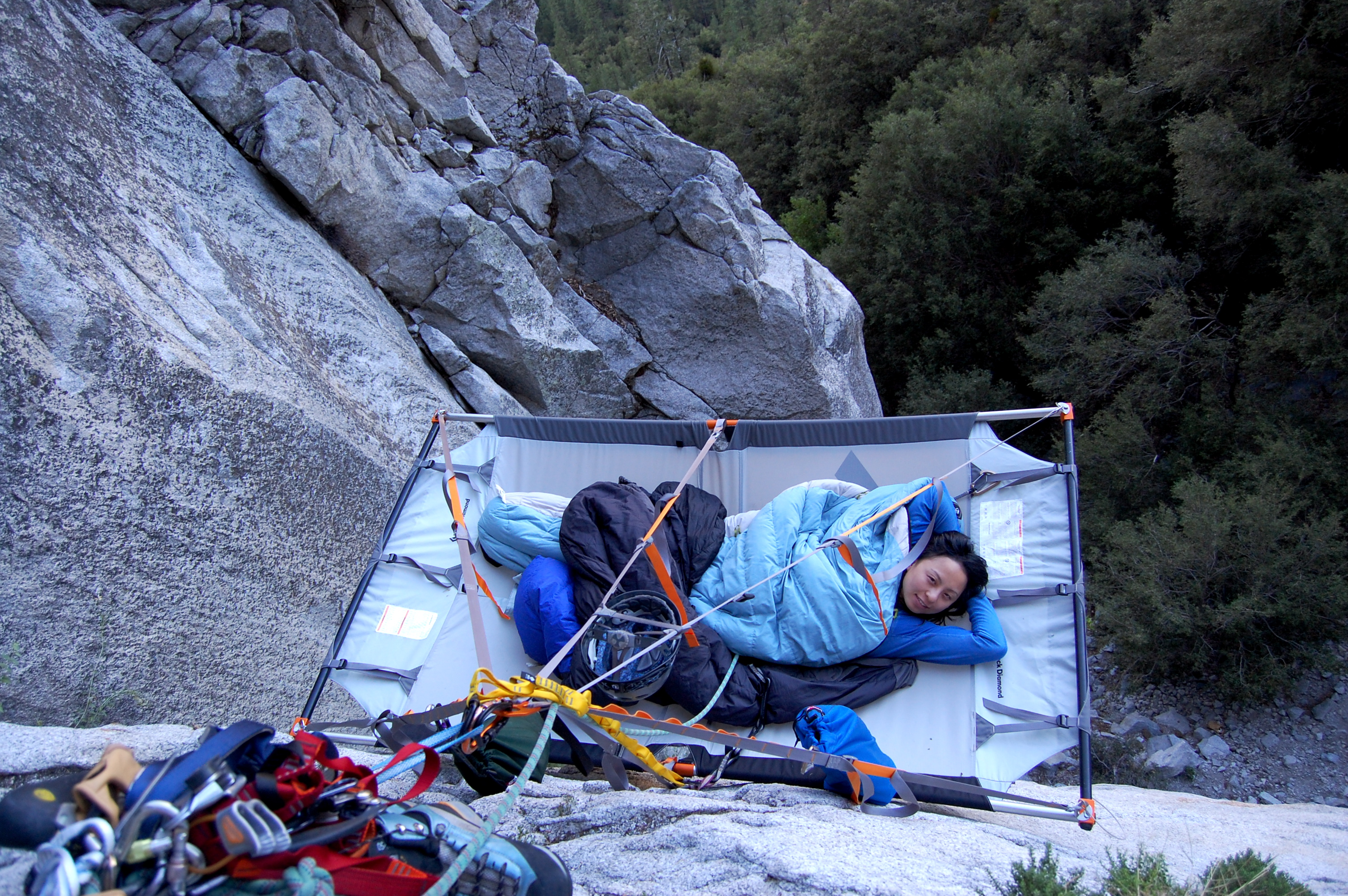
Lying on the 1986-2016 portaledge design

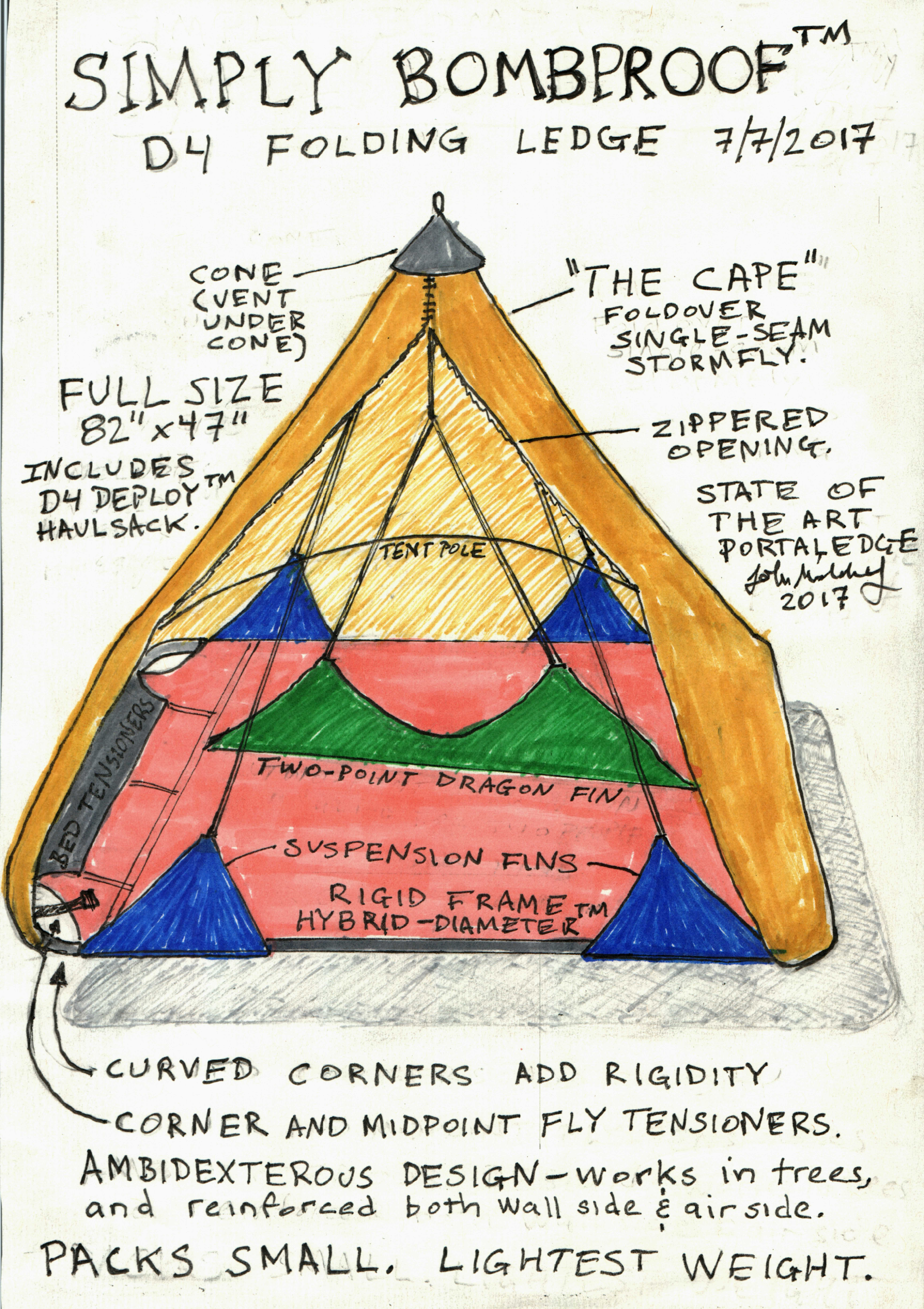
The 2017 D4 Portaledge re-invention supersedes the prior state of the art as published in the 1996 "Simply Bombproof" sketch.

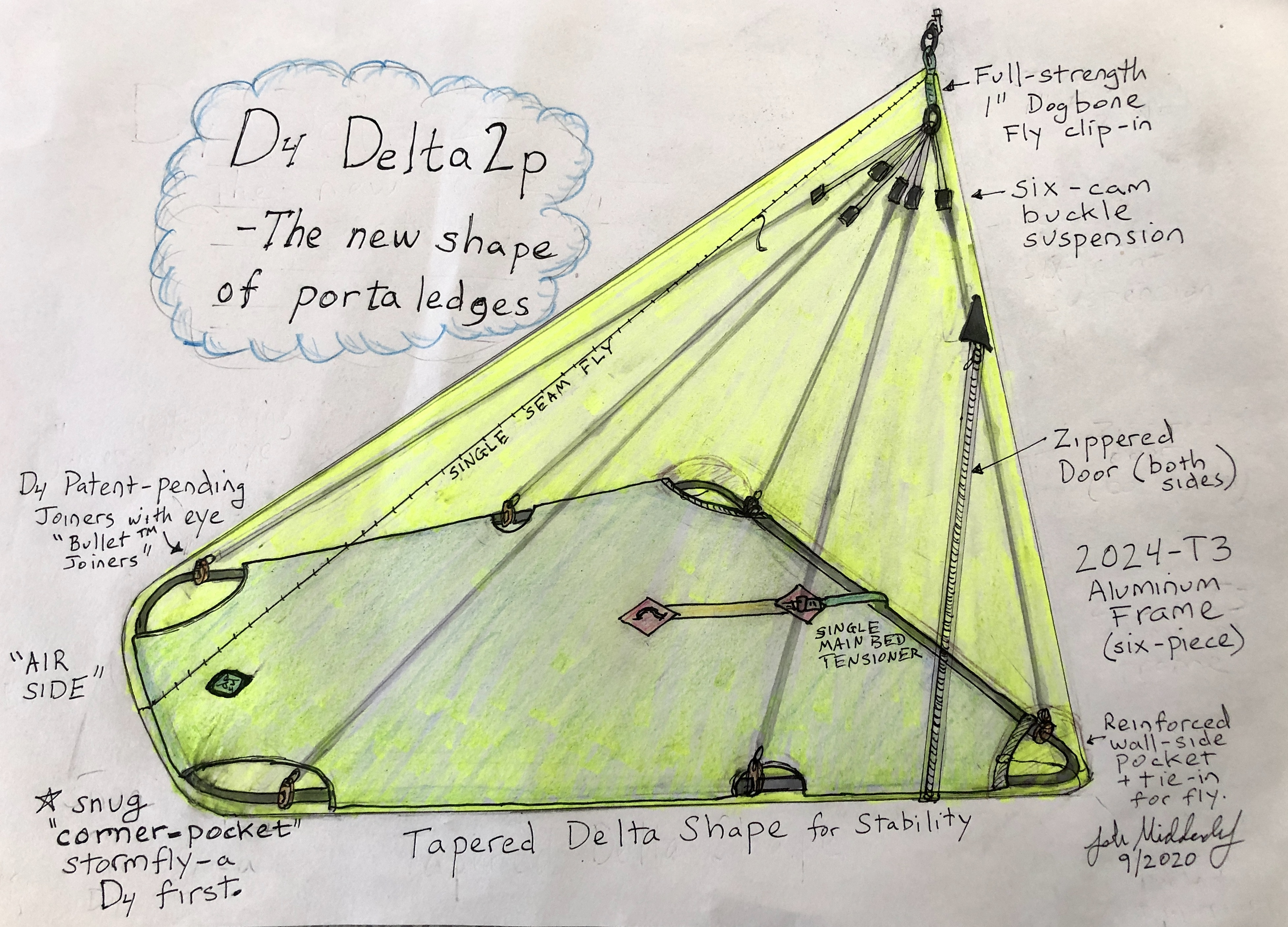
D4 Delta2p, the 2020 Middendorf design

=== 1950–1960 ===
Rock climber Warren Harding slept on natural ledges during his first ascent of El Capitan in Yosemite in 1958.

=== 1960–70 ===
The multiple-day routes on El Capitan pushed climbers to invent structures for sleeping. They began securing traditional two-point hammocks to cliff walls. Warren Harding invented the first hammock suspended from a central point, which he called a B.A.T. (Basically Absurd Technology) Tent. Central suspension facilitates deployment, prevents the tipping that occurs with two-point hammocks, and has since been integrated into every significant big wall sleeping structure. Harding almost died during his 1968 attempt on Half Dome in Yosemite after being trapped in a three-day storm, where his B.A.T Tent was filled with freezing rain and snow. Single-point hammocks allowed little sleep because they offered no weather resistance and crushed climbers' shoulders.

=== 1970–1980 ===
During the early 1970s, climbers Billy Westbay and Bruce Hawkins created the first portaledges by re-appropriating steel and canvas cots stolen from park lodges in Yosemite. These were a vast improvement from single-point hammocks with regard to comfort, but they were not collapsible and weighed up to thirty kilograms (almost three times the weight of today's models). During this period climbers also used Submarine Ledges, made from U.S. Navy aluminum tube cots that had been purchased from army surplus stores.

In 1972, the climber brothers Gregg and Jeff Lowe designed the LURP, a highly innovative portaledge prototype. The design's collapsible frame allowed the Lowes to climb without the bulk of a cot. Every significant portaledge since the LURP has had a collapsible frame. Another pioneering feature of this design was its nylon fly tent, which provided an enclosed shelter from the elements. Fly tents quickly became a standard element of portaledges. Jeff Lowe used the LURP on the first winter ascent of Yosemite's Half Dome. Although the prototype was never sold to others, the brothers included it in their catalogue of climbing products, which circulated widely among climbers.

By the late 1970s, the term "portaledge", which combines the words "portable" and "ledge", had become the common name for the typology. The originator of the term remains unknown to this day. Mike Graham, a famous American climber, founded his climbing gear company Gramicci in 1977. Over the next five years Graham sold over five hundred of the first commercially available portaledges, called Cliff Dwellings, to climbers in California and Europe. Graham made his Cliff Dwellings using equipment that he carried in his truck, and would set up his shop in friend's garages and basements. Graham's frame tubes slotted into each other at their corners, which allowed the frame to collapse into the smallest bag possible. His minimal corner connections were an important innovation, but they also made the Cliff Dwelling vulnerable to structural failure under extreme forces of nature. For an expedition to Patagonia in 1979, Graham designed the Fortress, the first portaledge large enough for two people. This model was constructed with ballistic nylon, a fabric strong enough to deflect small pieces of falling ice and rock. During the same year Graham made, but never tested, a prototype of a Windshield: a tent, suspended below the Cliff Dwelling that would deflect upward winds away from the portaledge.

=== 1980–1986 ===
The first portaledges used in Yosemite were non-collapsible cots purloined from Housekeeping Camp, a Yosemite Valley campground that featured primitive metal framed bunks for the campers. These heavy cots were used on multi-day climbs on granite monoliths like El Capitan, and then sometimes tossed off the summit for later retrieval. Mike Graham is credited with the first collapsible portaledge models available for retail purchase under the name of his company, Gramicci Products based in Ventura, California. The Gramicci Portaledge appeared in the very early 1980s and revolutionized multi-day big wall comfort. There were a few minor manufacturers that also dabbled in portaledge design in the early 1980s but could not get any traction in this niche market and soon faded from sight. In 1985 a small California-based company called Fish Products, founded by Russ Walling, started to manufacture one-person single portaledges. Other early Portaledge manufacturers were Fig, Frog (Ray Olsen), Lowe (never commercially available), and C&S Engineering.

=== 1986–1998 ===
In 1986, John Middendorf, a Stanford-trained mechanical engineer, founded A5 Adventures. Previously, Middendorf and his companions Steve Bosque and Mike Corbett had nearly died due to portaledge failure during a three-day storm on the 2000-foot south face of Half Dome, prompting Middendorf to redesign the modern portaledge. A5 portaledges were constructed of highly weatherproof fabrics and engineered to be structurally stable and strong. The company produced three models: the Single, the Alpine Double, and the Cliff Cabana. The A5 portaledges were the first that could withstand the severe weather conditions in remote areas such as the Himalayas and the Karakoram, enabling climbers to expand their horizons to the largest rock faces in the world. Middendorf himself used A5 portaledges on some of the hardest and remote big walls of the world, including during the first ascent of The Grand Voyage on the Great Trango Tower in 1992, the longest vertical big wall (1350m) in the world. The A5 Portaledge was sold worldwide.

=== 1998–2016 ===
The North Face (TNF) acquired the assets of A5 Adventures, including the A5 portaledge design, in 1998. Middendorf continued to steer the product for an additional two years at TNF before moving on to other pursuits outside of the climbing industry. The A5 portaledge designs were subsequently transferred to Black Diamond Equipment of Salt Lake City, Utah, who continue to produce the A5 designs with many added features. As of 2016, there were four major commercial suppliers of portaledges, making the following popular models:

- Black Diamond Single (81" × 31.5", 21.7 pounds with fly, modified clone of the A5 Single).
- Black Diamond Double (84" × 51", 28.4 pounds with fly and spreader bar, modified clone of the A5 Cliff Cabana).
- Runout Customs Double (75" × 42.25", 15 pounds with fly and haulsack, clone of the A5 Alpine Double).
- Metolius Single (84" × 30", 18.5 pounds with fly, haulsack, similar to the A5 block corner design.).
- Metolius Double (84" × 45", 21.5 pounds with fly, haulsack and spreader bar, similar to A5 design).
- Fish Single/Double (77" × 42", 13/16 pounds with fly; rigid corner ledge design, steel frame).

=== 2017 ===
In 2017, John Middendorf introduced a new portaledge design, called the D4 Portaledge (82" × 47", 16.5 pounds with haulsack, fly, and flypole). Instead of block corners, which has been the de facto standard since they were first introduced, the new D4 Portaledge has rounded curved tubing corners, which offer more rigidity and are lighter than the traditional block corners. The D4 portaledge brings many more innovations, including a newly engineered hybrid diameter tube design, which provides strength and rigidity without the need for a spreader bar, a new integrated haulsack/deployment system, and a completely simple but new concept for the stormfly—a single vertical zipped opening which enables the quickest deployment while also allowing full opening between storms. Also around this time, Middendorf introduces the D4 "bullet-joiner" which is a simple yet effective way to create a joint with overlapping tube strength, and rounded nose for quick self-assembling joints. The D4 has been produced in several sizes and besides being lighter and stronger, pack smaller (29" × 10" for the full size D4) than previous designs of portaledges.

=== 2020 ===
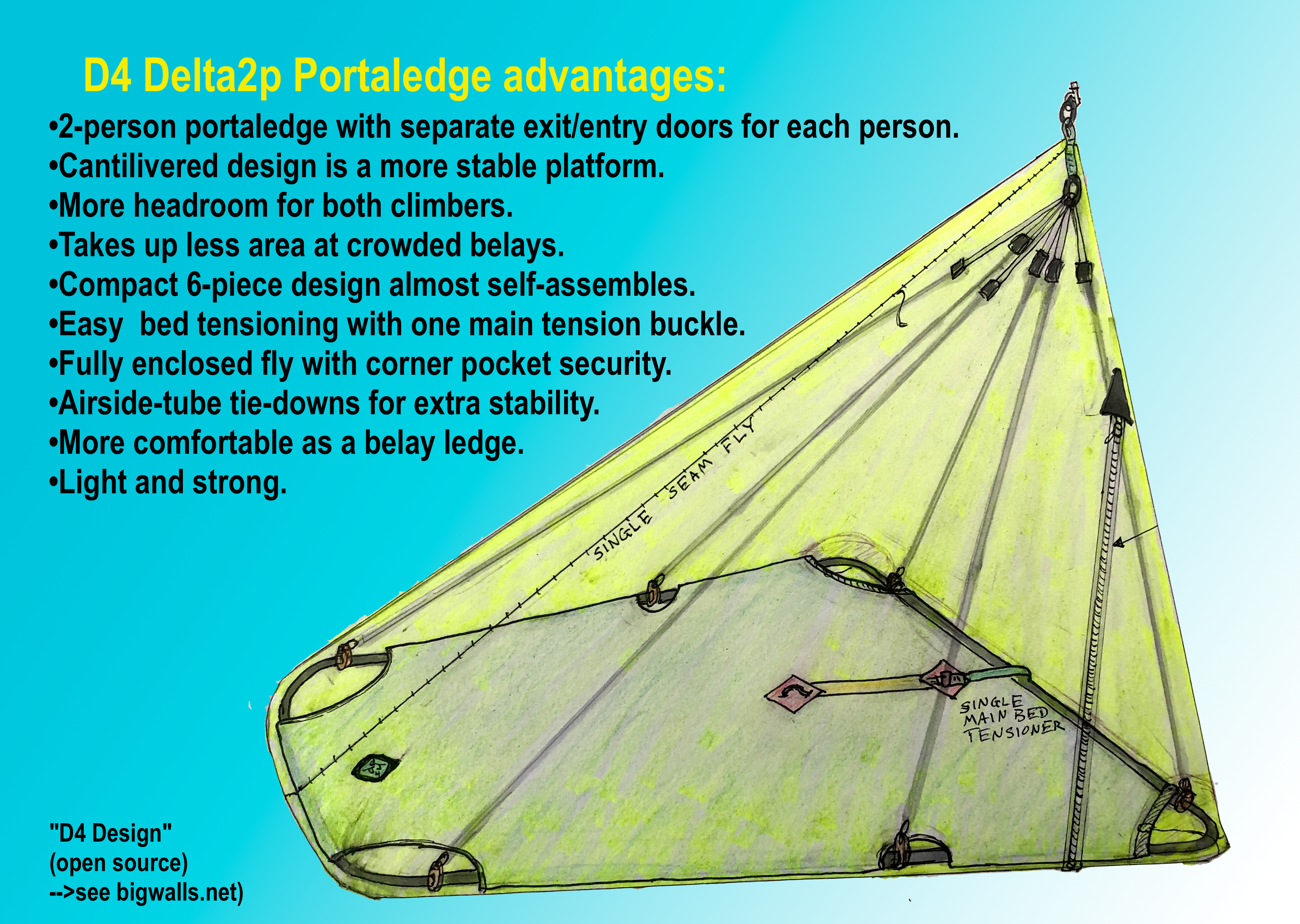
Delta2p (a D4 Design).

In 2020, Middendorf developed the "Delta2p" portaledge, a cantilevered design. Named for its delta shape and 2-person design, this design solved many longstanding issues with portaledges, including improved ergonomics and increased stability. The rigid six-piece frame design with curved corners and "D4 bullet-joiners" enables quick assembly, and folds compactly. Six prototypes which were sent to Yosemite and the Himalaya for testing, and an additional 42 Delta2p's were crafted in Tasmania in 2020/2021 and distributed worldwide; these weighed 6.5 kg. with haulsack and stormfly. Photos and open-source design notes available online: See also:

== Other uses ==
Portaledges have been used by tree-sitters during anti-logging civil disobedience protests, enabling them to remain aloft in trees for weeks, months, or sometimes years. They are also used in recreational tree camping.

== See also ==
- Bivouac shelter
- Rock-climbing equipment
