= Cafe La Haye =

- Interactive map of Cafe La Haye

Restaurant information
- Established: 1997
- Owner: Saul Gropman
- Head chef: Jeffrey Lloyd
- Food type: New American cuisine
- Dress code: Casual
- Rating: AAA Motor Club; Yelp; Zagat
- Location: 140 E. Napa St., Sonoma, California, 95476, United States
- Coordinates: 38°17′31″N 122°27′21.15″W
- Seating capacity: 38
- Reservations: Yes
- Website: cafelahaye.com

Cafe La Haye is a restaurant in Sonoma, California in the United States. It was opened by owner Saul Gropman in 1996. When Michael Bauer was the food critic for the San Francisco Chronicle, Cafe La Haye was a perennial listing in his annual Top 100 restaurants list and one of his favorite restaurants in Wine Country. Cafe La Haye sources food produced within 60 miles of the restaurant.

== History ==
Cafe La Haye was opened in 1996 by owner Saul Gropman. In 2009, Jeffrey Lloyd became the executive chef after Lloyd served as executive chef at Michael Mina and Aqua Restaurant. During the October 2017 Northern California wildfires, Gropman served food for first responders fighting the fires and also served a free, three course meal to locals. In 2019, the City of Sonoma sought to accelerate the state mandated $15 minimum wage increase, which would require all businesses to meet the $15 increase by 2023. The City Council proposed increasing it locally by 2021. Gropman supported the 2023 increase but opposed the 2021 increase to allow for "time to adjust" and more discussion. The proposal passed with businesses with 25 or fewer employees, like Cafe La Haye, being required to pay employees a minimum wage of $14. 2019 During COVID-19 pandemic in the San Francisco Bay Area, the restaurant adapted with take out, and when possible, outdoor dining.

== Cuisine ==
Cafe La Haye is described as serving New American cuisine and by the Michelin Guide, California cuisine. The restaurant is open only for dinner and has a chalkboard listing more expensive, nightly specials above the bar. All food is sourced within 60 miles of the downtown Sonoma restaurant.

The salads may include burrata with Early Girl tomatoes and squash blossoms in the summer. In the fall, organic mixed greens with candied pecans and grapes, beet and grapefruit salad, or a tomato bread salad. Appetizers may include house-smoked trout crepes, crab cakes, or portobello mushroom and polenta.

The nightly menu includes a seasonal risotto entree, which may be prepared with pine nuts in cauliflower broth. Seafood is also on the nightly menu, like include soy-sesame glazed halibut with whipped potatoes and braised kale or dayboat scallops. A pasta special is often on the menu, such as housemade tagliarini with lamb meatballs in a sauce comprising picholine olives, feta and goat cheese, eggplant and roasted peppers. Other offerings include steak and quail.

The dessert menu includes butterscotch pudding.

The wine list comprises local California wines from Sonoma and Napa and French wine.

== Ambiance ==
Cafe La Haye is a small restaurant with 34 seats. It has large windows facing the street and mirrors on the walls to give the illusion of a larger space. Paintings by local artists, available for sale, decorate the walls. A small bar, with four bar seats, overlooks the open air kitchen. Gropman is at the restaurant most nights, serving as maître d'.

== Reception ==
Michael Bauer of the San Francisco Chronicle called Cafe La Haye "charming" and in 2009 shared that the restaurant is "pleasant, but the interior takes a back seat to the food, which continues to showcase Sonoma's best." He listed it over 15 times on his Top 100 Bay Area Restaurants list. The Press Democrat's Jeff Cox said in 2014 that the restaurant "keeps getting better and better."

The Michelin Guide 2018 named Cafe La Haye a "good standard" restaurant, describing it as a "standby off the square in downtown Sonoma." They state that the restaurant "hasn't aged a day." Lonely Planet calls Cafe La Haye a "top table for earthy New American cooking" and that the "dining room gets packed cheek-by-jowl and service can border on perfunctory" but praises the "clean simplicity" and "flavor packed" food. The restaurant was named one of the best 50 restaurants in Sonoma County by Sonoma Magazine in 2018. The magazine called Cafe La Haye "Brilliant classic cooking at affordable prices in a contemporary, art gallery-style setting."

== Gallery ==
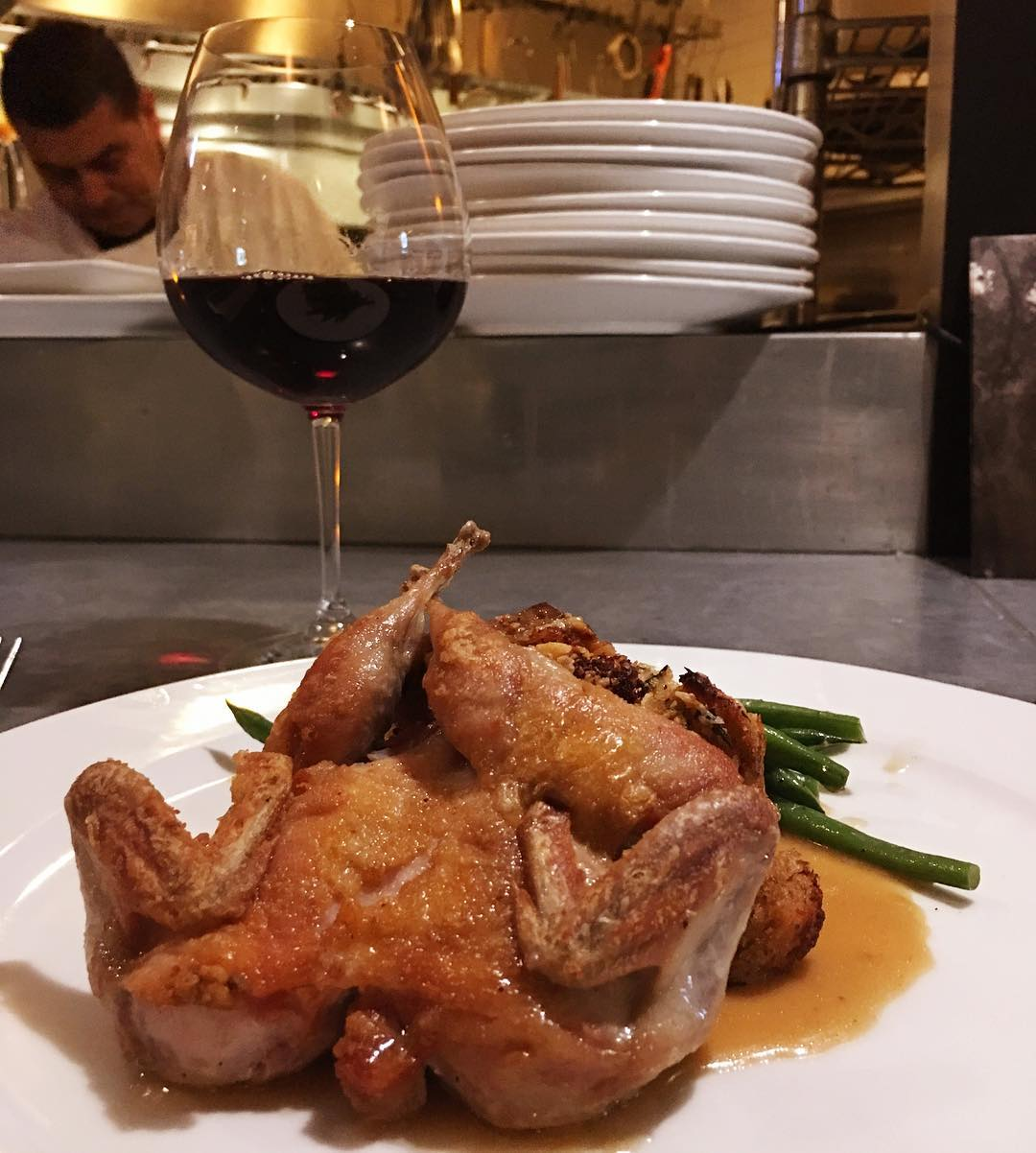
Quail at Cafe La Haye

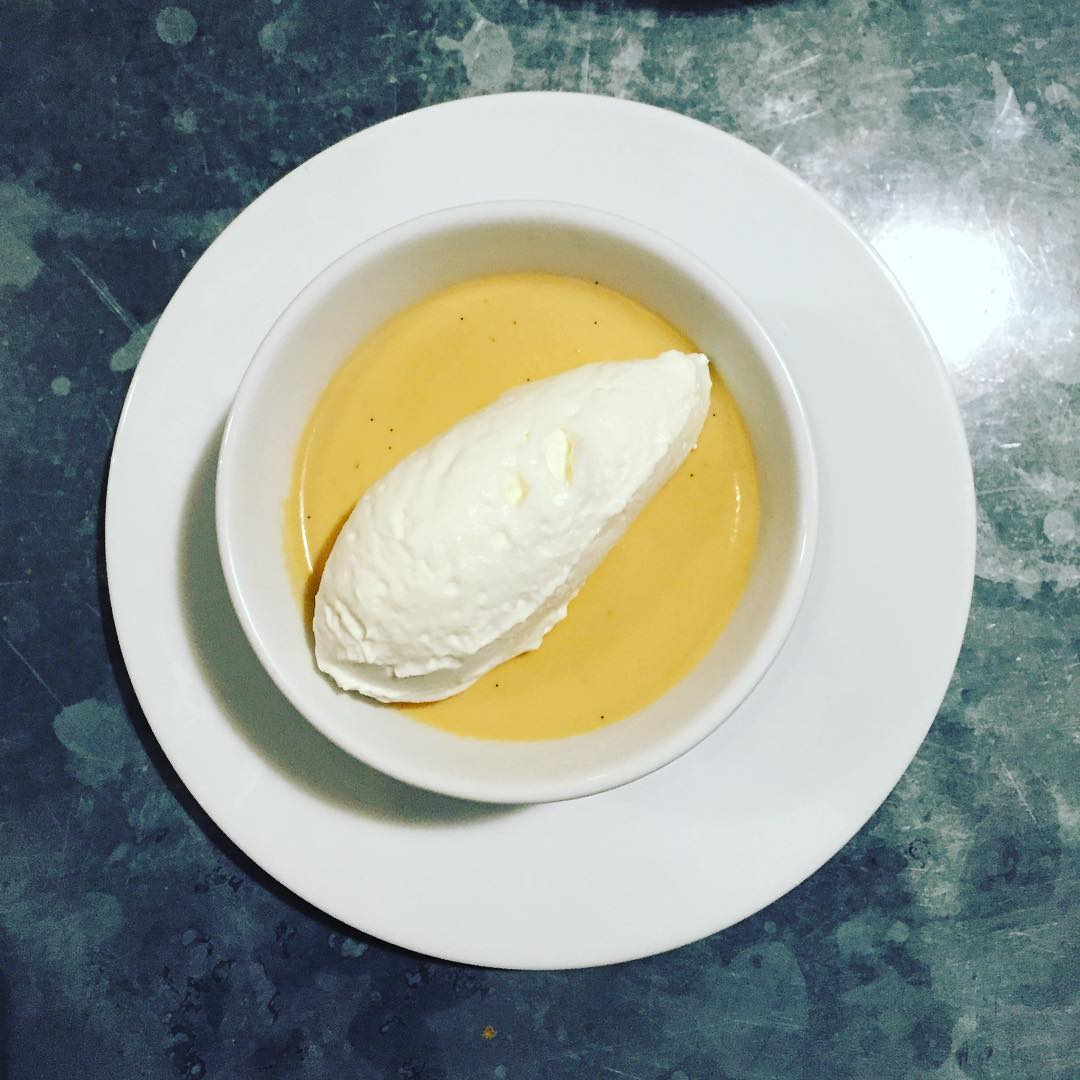
Butterscotch pudding
