= Parmelian Prints of the High Sierras =

Portfolio by Ansel Adams

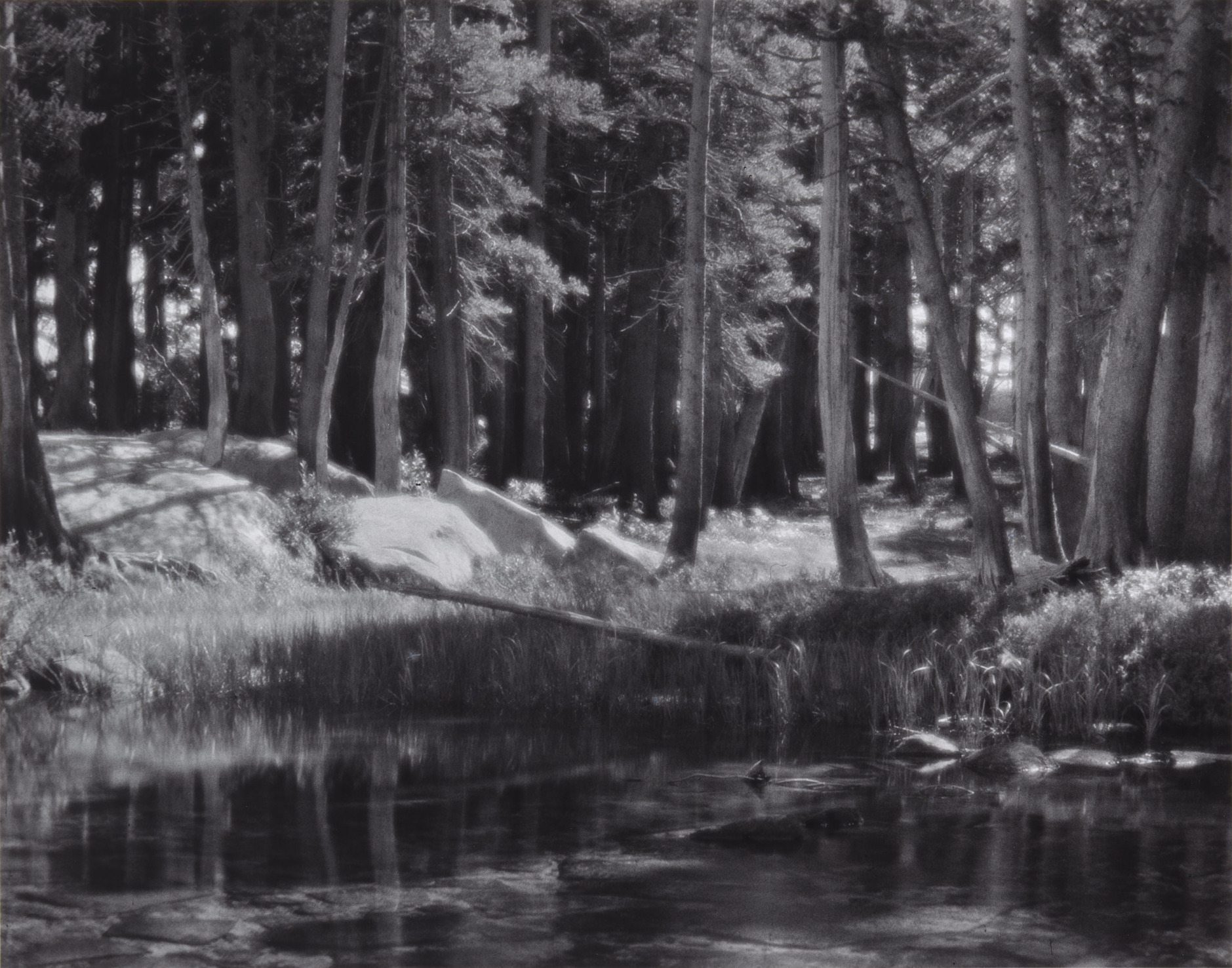
Lodgepole Pines, Lyell Fork of the Merced River, Yosemite National Park (1921), in the portfolio titled A Grove of Tamarack Pine

Parmelian Prints of the High Sierras is a portfolio of 18 silver gelatin photographic prints made by Ansel Adams in 1927. It was the first publication of a portfolio of his prints, produced not long after he decided to become a professional photographer, and has since been called "a landmark work in twentieth-century photography."

== History and content ==
As a member of the Sierra Club in the 1920s, Adams joined the club's annual month-long High Trips in the Sierra Nevada in addition to making several trips on his own. During these trips he captured large-format black-and-white images of many of the region's well-known features, including King's River Canyon, Muir Gorge, the pinnacles at the headwaters of King's River, Mount Brewer, The Black Kaweah, Mount Ritter, the Minarets, the area around South Fork of the San Joaquin and Evolution Valley. The best known of these images is Adams' first masterpiece: Monolith, the Face of Half Dome, taken in Yosemite Valley. The photographs he took on these trips became the core of the Parmelian Prints portfolio.

According to Adams, the idea for the portfolio came from Albert Bender, a well-known San Francisco art patron. The day after first meeting Adams in 1926, Bender met with him in Bender's office and suggested Adams create a portfolio which Bender would both support and help sell. Bender called his friend Jean Chambers Moore, a well-known publisher who agreed to oversee the production of the portfolio through the then highly respected Grabhorn Press. Bender immediately suggested an edition of 100 copies, plus 10 artist's copies, of 18 prints each. Within a few hours Bender had sold 56 sets of the edition by phone to his wealthy friends before any of them had met Adams or seen what the portfolio would look like.

The title of the portfolio was problematic to Adams. The term "parmelian" was a meaningless word invented by Moore, who believed that calling them "photographic prints" would not allow them to be taken seriously as art. Adams later said "I am not proud at allowing this breach of faith in my medium." To add to his chagrin, the word "Sierras" was also wrong. According to Adams, "The name Sierra is already a plural. To add an s is a linguistic, Californian, and mountaineering sin."

When the portfolio was published it included the statement "One Hundred and Fifty Copies Printed by the Grabhorn Press, San Francisco, August MCMXXVII". Moore apparently decided to increase the number of copies made after Bender's initial success in selling them, but neither Adams nor Moore kept track of how many copies of the portfolio were actually printed. Adams later estimated that only about 100 were completed. Of these, an unknown number were later destroyed in a warehouse fire; it is thought that no more than 75 copies were ever delivered to clients.

Adams himself printed each of the images for the portfolios on Kodak Vitava Athena Grade T Parchment paper, which was both cream-colored and translucent due to the thinness of the paper. The prints measure 5 3/4" x 7 3/4" (14.6 x 19.7 cm) on sheets of 10" x 12" (25.4 cm x 30.5 cm).

The eighteen prints included in the portfolio were titled as follows:

- Sierra Junipers
- The Abode of Snow
- Monolith, the Face of Half Dome
- From Glacier Point
- On the Heights
- A Grove of Tamarack Pine
- Mount Galen Clark
- Mount Clarence King
- Roaring River Falls
- Marion Lake
- El Capitan
- Banner Peak - Thousand Island Lake
- Mount Brewer
- Kearsarge Pinnacles
- The Sentinel
- East Vidette
- Lower Paradise Valley
- Cloud and Mountain

== Art market ==
In August, 2011, a complete copy of the portfolio was offered for sale for $110,000.
