= Goldin+Senneby =

Collaborative duo of artists

Goldin+Senneby is the collaborative duo of artists Simon Goldin and Jakob Senneby. They have worked together under this name since 2004 and are based in Stockholm.

Their collaboration started with The Port (2004–2006); a series of insertions into the online world Second Life, exhibited among other places on Artport, Whitney Museum of American Art in 2005.

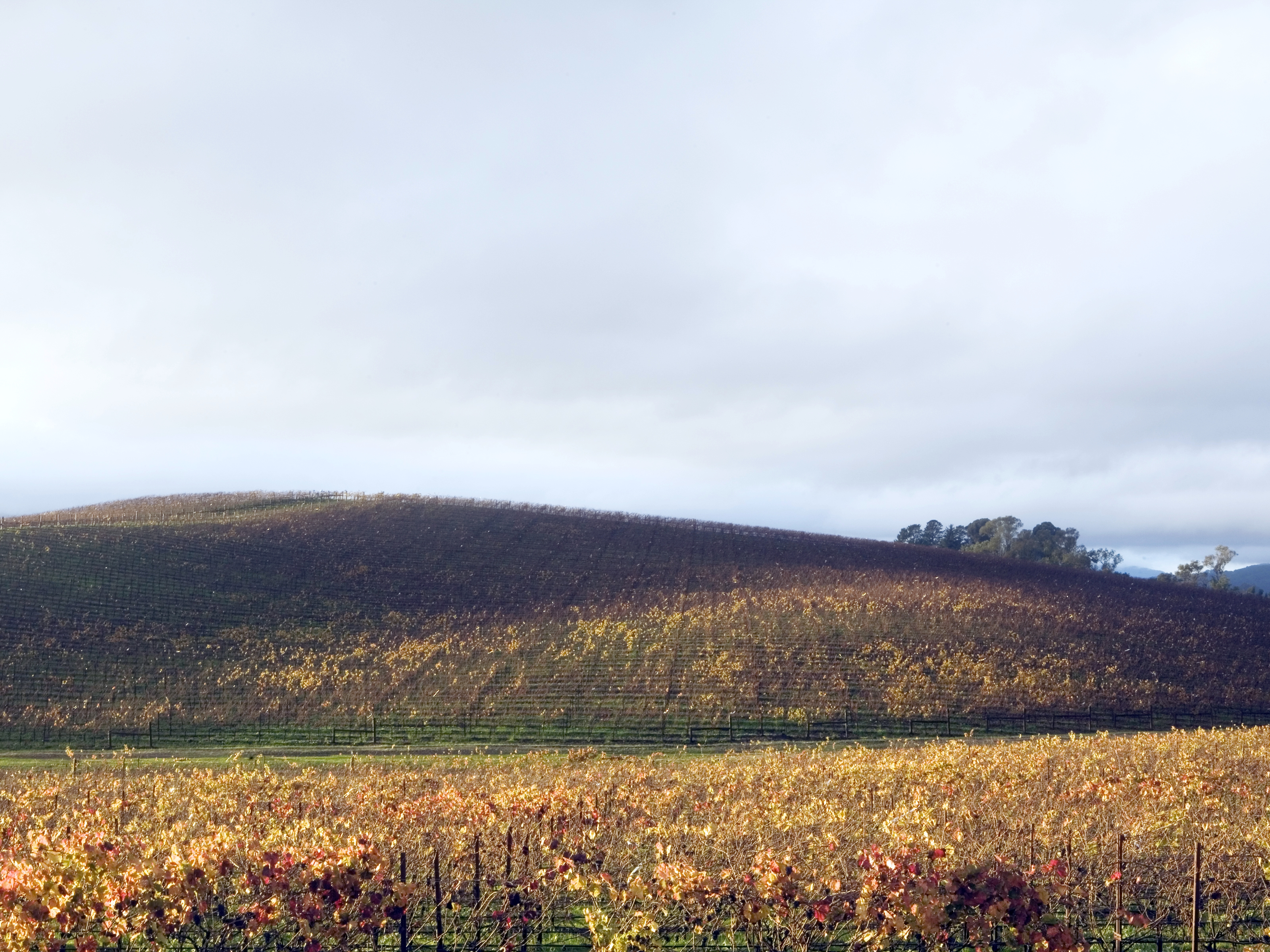
Bliss re-creation by Goldin+Senneby in November 2006, then covered by a vineyard

They are also known for the project AfterMicrosoft, in which they re-photographed the site in Sonoma valley where Bliss, the default wallpaper in Windows XP, was taken.

In the project Headless (2007–2015), they approach the sphere of offshore finance, and its production of virtual space through legal code. Looking at strategies of withdrawal and secrecy, they trace an offshore company in the Bahamas called Headless Ltd. A ghostwritten detective novel continuously narrates their investigations. This work was exhibited at the 28th São Paulo Art Biennial, The Power Plant, Toronto, with an epilogue at Kadist in Paris.

A series of NFTs titled Spot Price (2023), was published on Triple Canopy (online magazine) with Nome Gallery in Berlin. The project is accompanied by the long-form essay Regions of Interest.
