= George Anderson (mountaineer) =

Scottish mountain climber (1839–1884)

George G. Anderson
Personal information
- Nationality: Scottish
- Born: 1839 Montrose, Scotland
- Died: May 8, 1884 (aged 44–45) Yosemite National Park, California

Climbing career
- Type of climber: Mountaineering
- First ascents: Half Dome Cables (aid climb), Oct. 1875

George G. Anderson (1839 – May 8, 1884) was a Scottish mountaineer who is best known for making the first ascent to the summit of Half Dome in Yosemite National Park in California, United States on October 12, 1875. During the climb, he drilled the holes which, after 1919, came to house the cables of the popular route up Half Dome. A pioneer without the benefit of modern climbing gear or techniques, Anderson worked barefoot, and placed iron spikes drilled into the rock for protection. The ascent took him days on end. His one-room log cabin, originally located at what is now Foresta just west of Yosemite Valley, was moved to the Pioneer Yosemite History Center in Wawona where it continues to be preserved.

== See also ==
- History of rock climbing
