= Lodgepole Pines, Lyell Fork of the Merced River =

1921 photograph by Ansel Adams

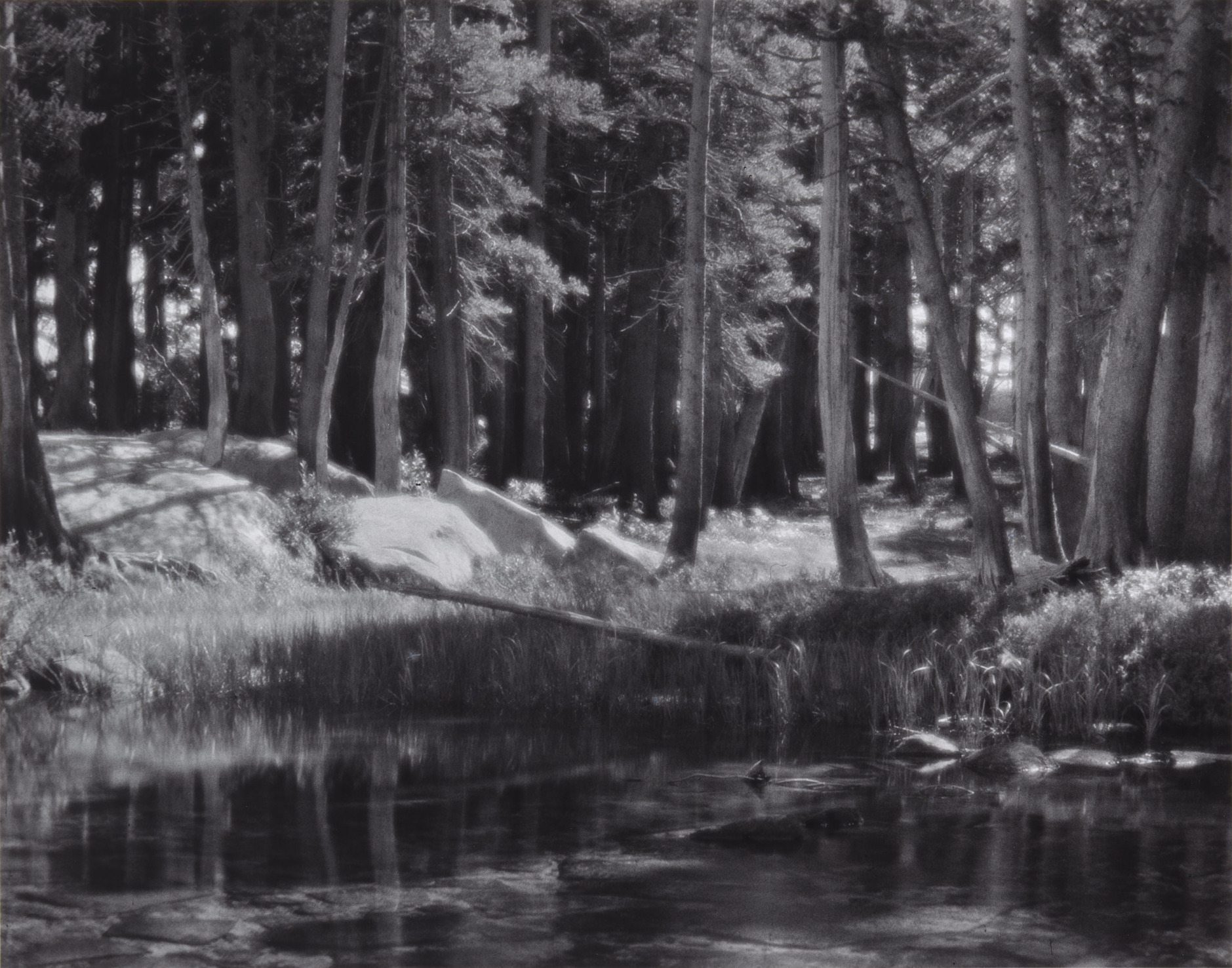
Lodgepole Pines, Lyell Fork of the Merced River, Yosemite National Park (1921)

Lodgepole Pines, Lyell Fork of the Merced River, Yosemite National Park is a black-and-white photograph taken by Ansel Adams in 1921.

== History and description ==
It is one of the photographs that he took at the beginning of his career, when he was following pictorialism, a style inspired by painting, that he soon would abandon for a more realistic approach to photography. This photograph with the title A Grove of Tamarack Pine was included in his Parmelian Prints of the High Sierras portfolio, published in 1927, and it's also known by that name.

The picture is one of the several in the pictoralistic style that he took at this time at Yosemite National Park. Rachel McLean Sailor describes this set of pictures as "romantic in form, transferring concrete places to softly lit, dreamlike places".

== Public collections ==
There are several prints of this picture, sometimes with their alternative title, held in the collections of several art museums, including the National Gallery of Art, Washington, D.C., the Metropolitan Museum of Art, New York, the Los Angeles County Museum of Art, the New Mexico Museum of Art, Santa Fe and the National Gallery of Australia, Canberra.
