= John Middendorf =

American mountain climber and inventor (1959–2024)

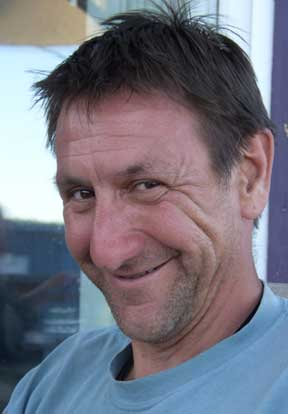
- Middendorf, 2006
- Born: John William Middendorf IV; November 18, 1959; New York City, New York, U.S.
- Died: June 21, 2024 (aged 64); Little Compton, Rhode Island, U.S.
- Other names: Deucey
- Education: Bachelor of Science in Mechanical Engineering Stanford (1983) MA, Architectural Design Harvard MA, Teaching University of Tasmania
- Alma mater: Stanford
- Occupation: Climbing
- Known for: Big wall climbing and founding A5 Adventures, a big-wall-equipment manufacturing company.
- Notable work: Grand Voyage, Trango Towers 1992
- Spouse: Jeni Middendorf
- Children: 2
- Parents: J. William Middendorf (father); Isabelle Paine Middendorf (mother)

John William Middendorf IV (November 18, 1959 – June 21, 2024) was an American big wall climber, mountaineering writer and designer of climbing equipment.

In the 1980s, he climbed the hardest walls of Yosemite, including El Capitan and Half Dome, and in 1992 he climbed the largest rock wall in the world, Great Trango Tower. Also in the late 1980s and early 1990s, he pioneered numerous difficult big wall routes in Zion National Park. He was also a renowned portaledge designer and writer.

== Biography ==
Middendorf began climbing after discovering the sport at summer camp when he was 14 years old. After finishing high school he travelled across the United States, before heading to Dartmouth College. After a year, he transferred to Stanford University, where in 1983 he graduated with a degree in Mechanical Engineering. After graduation, he headed to Yosemite where he worked as a member of the search and rescue team, and pioneered many new routes.

=== Equipment maker ===
While climbing on Half Dome, a failure of a portaledge nearly led to the death of Middendorf and his companions Steve Bosque and Mike Corbett, and Middendorf became interested in better designs. Middendorf decided to leave Yosemite in 1986 and founded A5 Adventures Inc., to design and manufacture portaledges in Flagstaff, Arizona.

Based on his near-death experience, Middendorf's portaledge designs were among the first that could withstand the severe weather of high alpine destinations including the Himalayas and Karakoram. A5 went on to design and manufacture a variety of big-wall climbing gear, including aiders, slings, haul bags and packs, climbing protection hardware, and other items.

=== Great Trango new route ===
In 1992, Middendorf achieved recognition for the first ascent of the East Face of Great Trango Tower (6,286 m) in Pakistan's Karakoram range with Xaver Bongard. As a two-man team climbing in lightweight alpine-style, they were the first to successfully summit and descend the largest rock face involving big wall climbing of Great Trango Tower. All attempts of this wall previously had ended in tragedy or were unsuccessful at reaching the summit.

The Grand Voyage ascends the 1,350 metre vertical and overhanging rock wall of Great Trango to the East Summit of Great Trango Tower at 6,231 metres. Over 2,000 metres of climbing is involved from the Dungee Glacier. The 1992 new route required 15 days and nights to climb and three days to descend, using portaledges specifically designed and constructed by Middendorf's A5 Adventures, Inc.

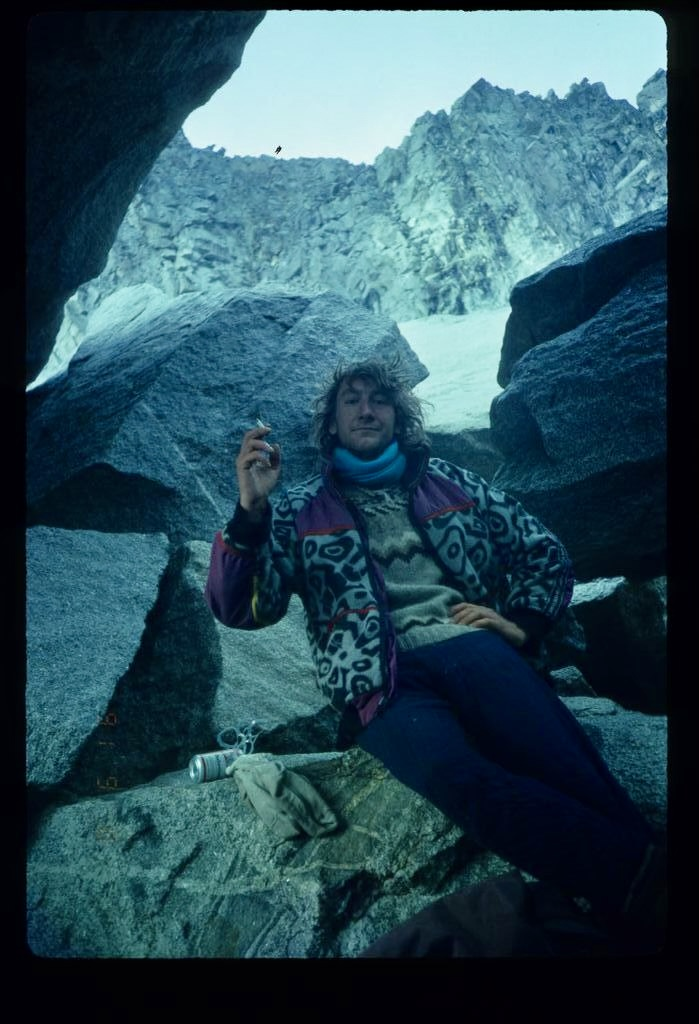
John Middendorf in the Wind River Range, 1991.

=== Move to Australia and environmental activism ===
In 1997, A5 Adventures Inc. was acquired by The North Face. Middendorf remained at the company as a Senior Product Manager for several years, but then stepped away from creating climbing equipment. He then sought new adventures as a writer, journalist and tour guide in the Grand Canyon. It was during his time as a tour guide where he met his wife, Jeni.

In 2003, Middendorf began studies in fabric materials engineering in Sydney, Australia. While in Australia, he visited climber, Paul Pritchard in Tasmania and fell in love with the region. Middendorf and his family moved to Tasmania, Australia in 2006. There, he continued to climb, and got involved in environmental activism, contributing portaledges to activists working to save old growth forests. Middendorf also became an educator in the Tasmanian school system.

In 2016, he began building climbing equipment once more, under a new brand name, D4. The next year, while employed as a high school mathematics, science, and robotics teacher in the Tasmanian school system, he began a three-year redesign of portaledges, cumulating in the two-person D4 Delta2p design and the three-person D4 Delta3p design, the first “foot-out” portaledge designs. He also built a number of other designs, including the D4 Trapezium, a small compact shelter that he personally tested in high winds and extreme weather in the forests of Tasmania as part of protests against the denuding of Tasmanian temperate rainforests. After building over a hundred portaledges and networking with the world’s best bigwall climbers, he considered the design “mature” — meaning completely patterned and tested in the field with successive prototype batches — and made all his design work open-source, with all construction and engineering details available on his Web site, Bigwalls.net. One design, the "DIY Activist Ledge" was created specifically for non-violent protests, allowing activists to occupy giant trees safely and for low material costs.

=== Death ===
John Middendorf died in his sleep on June 21, 2024, from a suspected stroke on a family visit. He was 64.

== Researcher and writer ==
Middendorf wrote extensively on climbing and activism topics, with many published articles and books dating to 1987, notably for the American Alpine Club. Between 2021 and 2023, he completed a two-volume history of climbing tools and techniques dating back several centuries titled Mechanical Advantage: Tools for the Wild Vertical.
