= Monolith, the Face of Half Dome =

1927 photograph by Ansel Adams

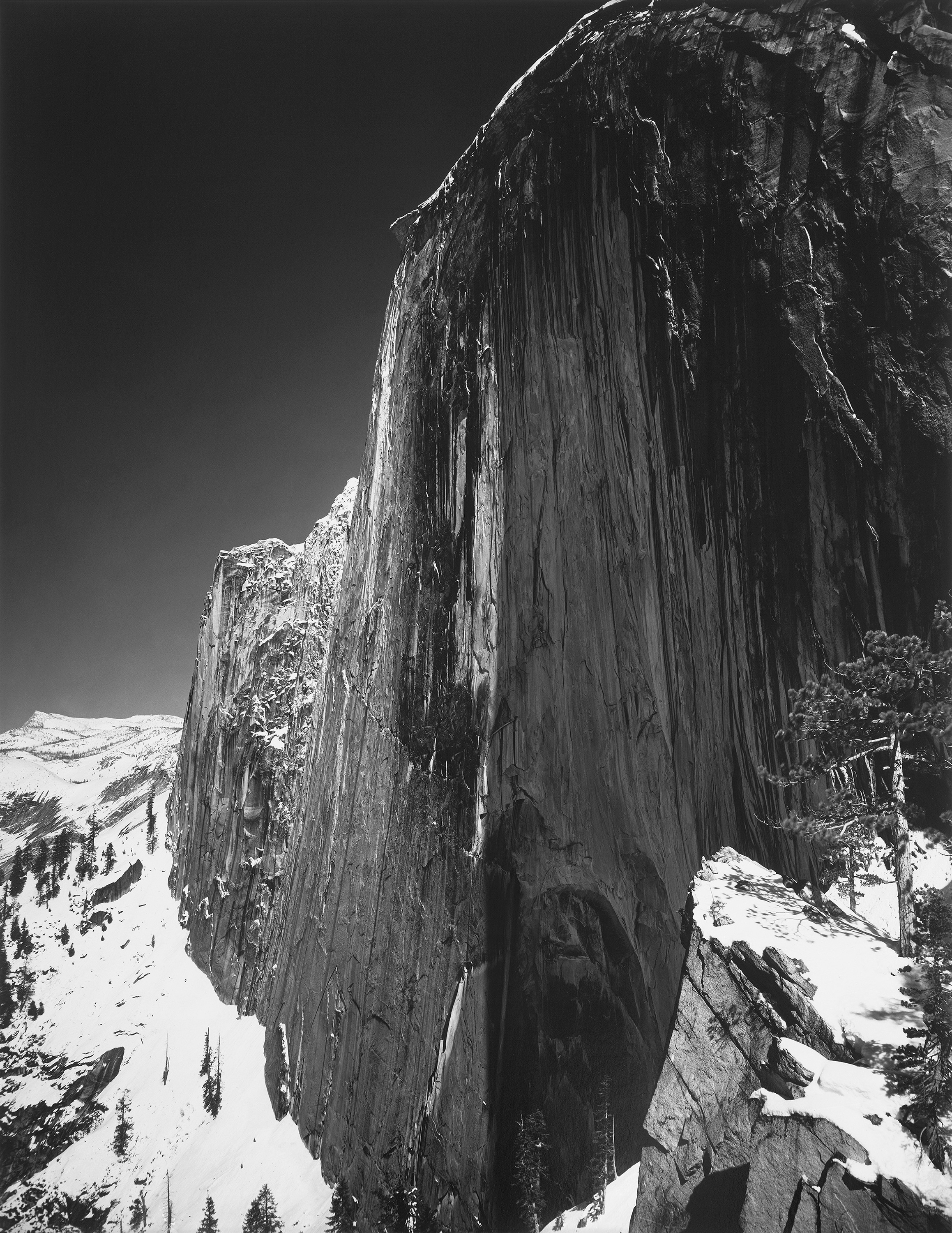
Monolith, the Face of Half Dome, Yosemite National Park, California (1927).

Monolith, the Face of Half Dome, Yosemite National Park, California is a black and white photograph taken by Ansel Adams in 1927 that depicts the western face of Half Dome in Yosemite, California. In the foreground of the photo, viewers are able to see the texture and detail of the rock. Pine trees and the Tenaya Peak are visible in the background. Monolith was used by the Sierra Club as a visual aid for the environmental movement, and was the first photograph Adams made that was based on feelings, a concept he would come to define as visualization and prompt him to create the Zone System. The original glass plate negative of Monolith is still intact and printable. The photograph is a part of the portfolio Parmelian Prints of the High Sierras, released in 1927.

== Location ==
On April 17, 1927, Ansel Adams, three friends, Cedric Wright, Charles Michael, Arnold Williams, and his girlfriend Virginia Best, set out on a half-day hike to the "Diving Board", the location from which Monolith was taken. The "Diving Board" is a large rock that jets out over the Yosemite Valley, four-thousand feet below the western face, providing the a picturesque view of Half Dome. In his backpack Adams had a 6 1/2 in × 8 1/2 in (17 cm × 22 cm) Korona view camera with various lenses and filters, twelve Wratten panchromatic glass plates, and a large wooden tripod. Having a heavy load, he was also wearing basketball sneakers which struggled to tread on the snowy terrain. Once they reached the "Diving Board", Adams arrived at the vantage point of the rock that looms three-quarters of a mile (1,200 m) tall and four-tenths of a mile (640 m) thick and sprawls across 13 acres (5.3 ha). When he first arrived at noon, the light was not how he wanted it to be, so he waited over two hours. He envisioned the rock to be half in shadow and half in light. Adams took multiple other images on the climb and while waiting, and was only left with two glass plates to capture the ideal photo of Half Dome. Given the manual nature of view cameras, it is easy to incorrectly set the aperture or shutter speed, and a gust of wind can blur a photograph. At 2:30 pm with two glass plates remaining, Adams was ready to take the photograph of Half Dome he had envisioned in his mind. Despite the constraints, the photograph was made in a single exposure.

== Development process and technique ==
Adams was previously aware of the photographic technique photogenia, which is the practice of intentionally manipulating lighting, exposure, and printing to communicate meaning. With photogenia in mind, he took his first exposure of Half Dome using a K2 Yellow filter. The product was Half Dome with K2 Yellow Filter, 1927, but Adams thought that the contrast would not create a dramatic enough feeling, as with the yellow filter, the sky would still be light and there would be minimal tonal contrast. Adams was determined to conjure a photo that expressed the same overwhelming feeling that he felt standing on the "Diving Board" looking up at Half Dome that afternoon. Photographic emulsions are less sensitive to red light, so photographs of reds are darker and underexposed. Adams used a deep-red filter to transform the bright sky into a dark black background. The contrast between the white snow and black sky work to make smaller details more clear, drawing the eye to the highlighted elements. Monolith was Adam's first time controlling the viewer's experience of his photos in this manner and was his first time using photographic principles that are reflected and refined in his later work.

== Visualization and the zone system ==
Monolith prompted Adams to coin the term "visualization". Monolith broke through straight photography and introduced "visualization" as a method in which a photographer knows the way they want the photo to look, and carefully controls aspects of the scene, emulsion, filter, and developmental process to create their exact "envisionment". Adams said, "I see my finished platinum print on the ground glass in all its desired qualities, before my exposure". With Monolith, visualization was an essential element to its creation. In regards to the photograph, Adams stated, "I began to think about how the print was to appear, and if it would transmit any of the feeling of the monumental shape before me in terms of its expressive-emotional quality. I realized that only a deep red filter would give me anything approaching the effect I felt emotionally."

Additionally, the Zone System that Adams created was a structured way photographers could use dark-room and development techniques to achieve their visualizations. The "Zone System" works to carefully control exposure and development of the negative, and promotes using the dark room and framing techniques to emote a visual experience. Adams created ten different zones to describe a numerical range of the whitest photos to the blackest photos. A photographer can visualize how they want a print to look, choose the corresponding number in the zone range, then follow subsequent exposing, developing and printing methods to create desired tones.

== Lasting significance ==
The lasting significance and display surrounding Monolith is crucial to the development of modern photography, the environmentalist movement, and photography's role in social movements. The distribution and expansion of audience is something that makes Monolith and Ansel Adams' work particularly important. He enlarged his photographs on photomurals, cards, posters, and "coffee-table" books; media that are easily accessible to all members of society. Monolith is the cover image for his most published book, Yosemite.

Having been originally published in 1927, the photograph fell into the United States public domain, meaning it lost its existing copyright status and protection, on January 1, 2023.

== Public collections ==
There are prints, among other visual arts museums, in the Metropolitan Museum of Art, in New York City, the Museum of Modern Art in New York City, the Museum of Fine Arts, in Boston, Massachusetts, and the San Francisco Museum of Modern Art, in San Francisco, California.

== See also ==
- List of photographs considered the most important
