= Half Dome =

Granitic dome in Yosemite National Park, California

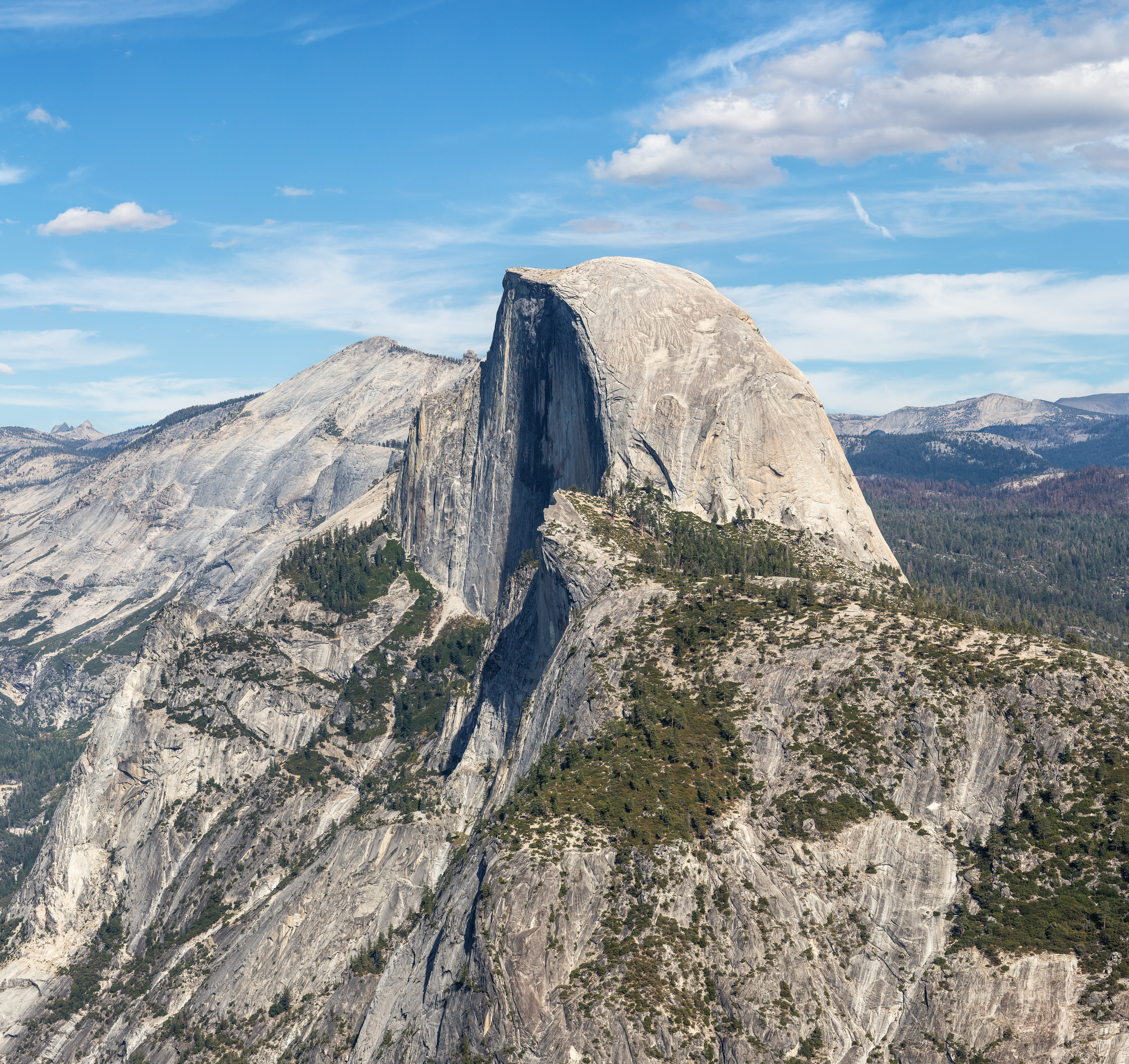
- Half Dome seen from Glacier Point

Highest point
- Elevation: 8,846 ft (2,696 m) NAVD 88
- Prominence: 1,360 ft (410 m)
- Parent peak: Clouds Rest
- Listing: Highest mountains of Yosemite NP
- Coordinates: 37°44′46″N 119°31′59″W

Geography
- Location within California
- Country: United States
- State: California
- County: Mariposa
- Parent range: Sierra Nevada
- Topo map: USGS Half Dome

Geology
- Rock age(s): Cretaceous, 93 Myr
- Mountain type: Quartz monzonite batholith

Climbing
- First ascent: 1875 by George Anderson
- Easiest route: Cable route

Half Dome is a quartz monzonite batholith at the eastern end of Yosemite Valley in Yosemite National Park, California. It is a well-known rock formation in the park, named for its distinct shape. One side is a sheer face while the other three sides are smooth and round, making it appear like a dome cut in half. It stands at over 8,800 feet above sea level and is composed of quartz monzonite, an igneous rock that solidified several thousand feet within the Earth. At its core are the remains of a magma chamber that cooled slowly and crystallized beneath the Earth's surface. The solidified magma chamber was then exposed and cut in half by erosion, therefore leading to the geographic name Half Dome.

== Geology ==
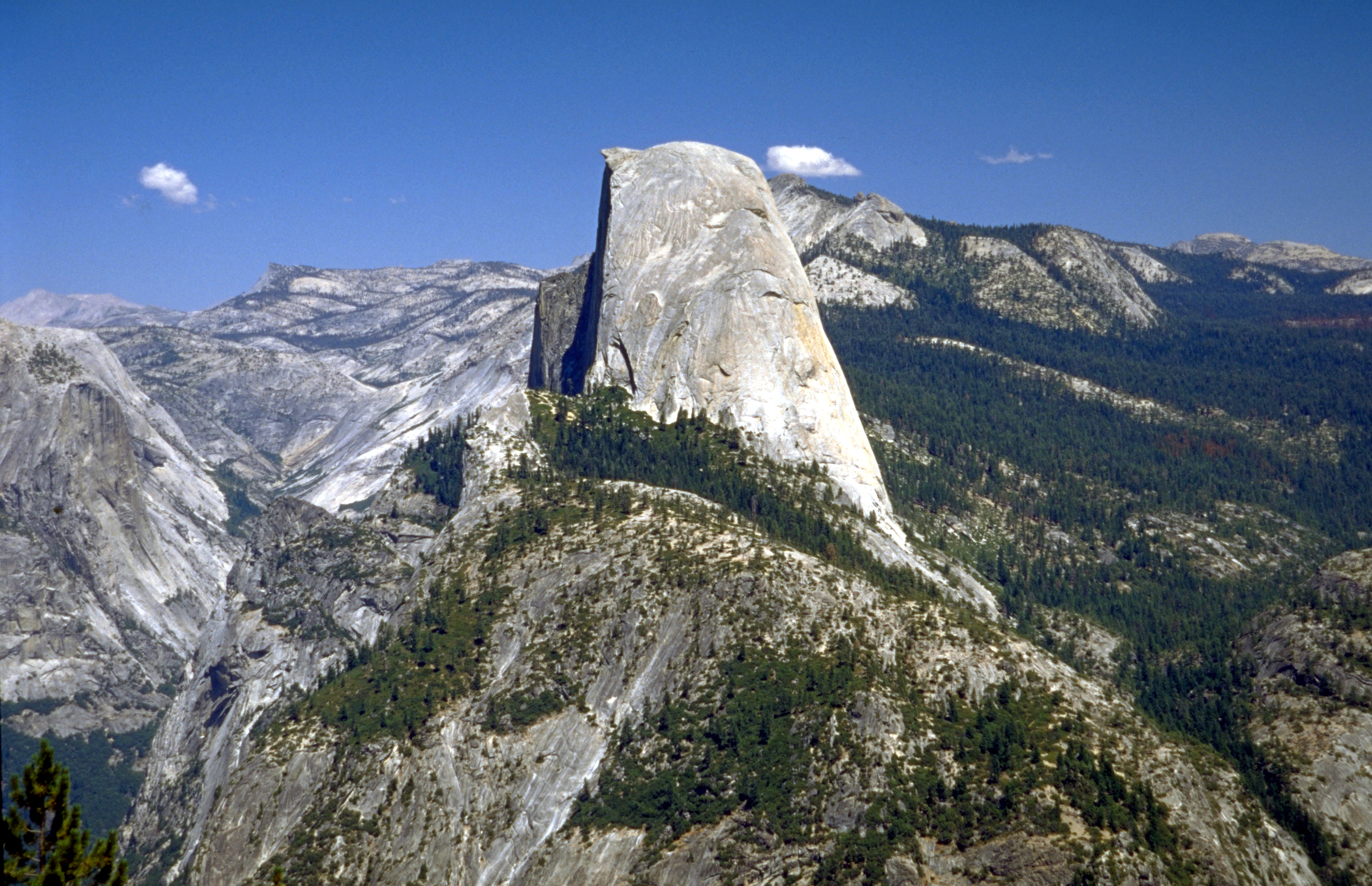
Half Dome seen from Washburn Point

The impression from the valley floor that this is a round dome that has lost its northwest half, is just an illusion. From Washburn Point, Half Dome can be seen as a thin ridge of rock, an arête, that is oriented northeast–southwest, with its southeast side almost as steep as its northwest side except for the very top. Although the trend of this ridge, as well as that of Tenaya Canyon, is probably controlled by master joints, 80 percent of the northwest "half" of the original dome may well still be there.

== Ascents ==
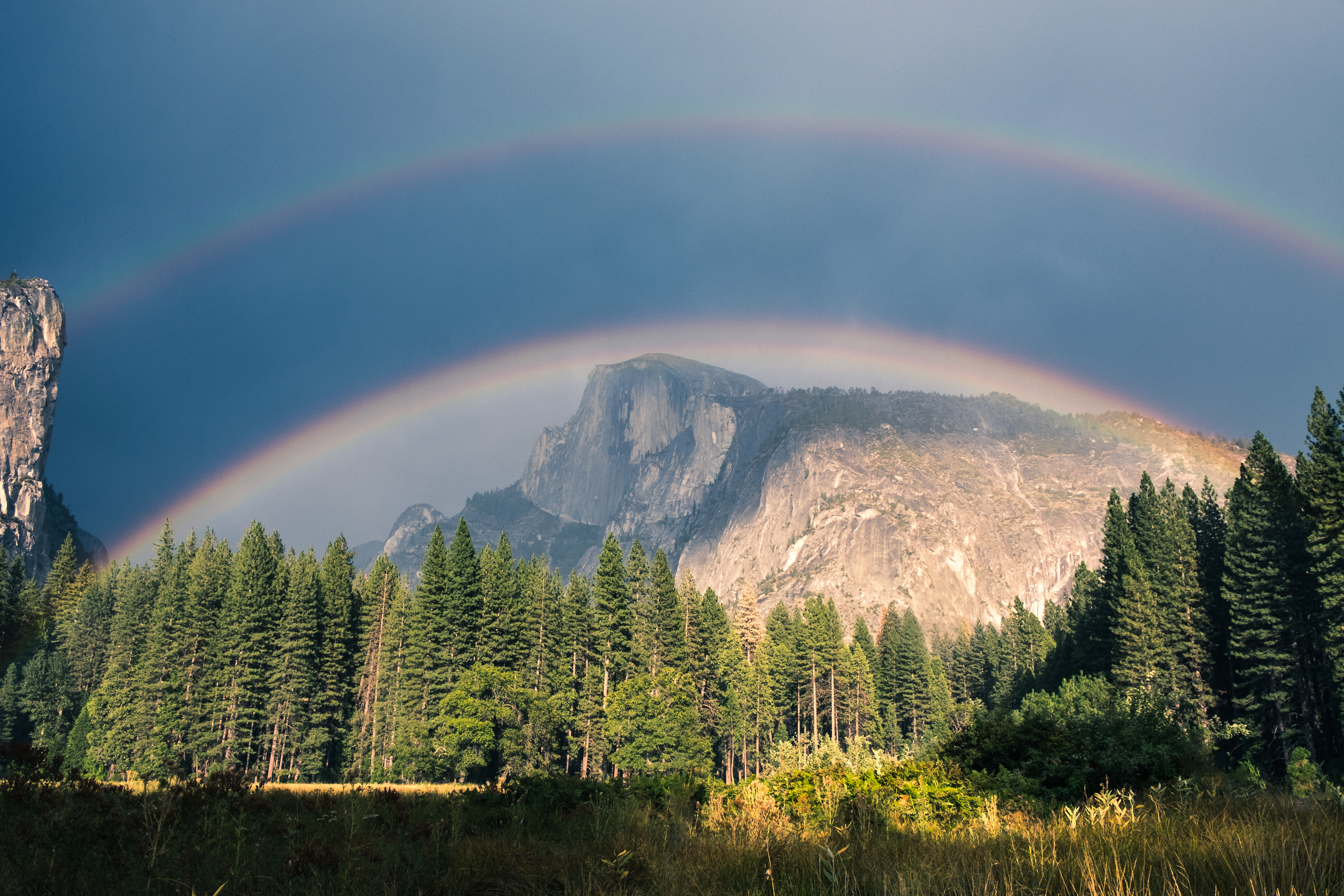
A rainbow over Half Dome

As late as the 1870s, Half Dome was described as "perfectly inaccessible" by Josiah Whitney of the California Geological Survey. The summit was reached by George Anderson in October 1875, via a route constructed by drilling and placing iron eye bolts into the smooth rock. Anderson had previously tried a variety of methods, including using pitch from nearby pine trees for extra friction.

Anderson subsequently went on to add ropes to his eye bolts, so that other people could climb. Among those who took advantage was S. L. Dutcher, of San Francisco, the first woman to climb Half Dome, in 1876. In 1877 James Mason Hutchings along with Anderson led a climb which included Hutchings' daughter Cosie, his son Willie, his 65-year-old mother-in-law Florantha Thompson Sproat, and two other women.

Today, Half Dome may be ascended in several different ways. Thousands of hikers reach the top each year by following an 8.5 mi (13.7 km) trail from the valley floor. After a rigorous 2 mi (3.2 km) approach, including several hundred feet of rock stairs, the final pitch up the peak's steep but somewhat rounded east face is ascended with the aid of a pair of post-mounted steel cables originally constructed close to the Anderson route in 1919.

Alternatively, over a dozen rock climbing routes lead from the valley up Half Dome's vertical northwest face. The first technical ascent was in 1957 via a route pioneered by Royal Robbins, Mike Sherrick, and Jerry Gallwas, today known as the Regular Northwest Face. Their five-day epic was the first Grade VI climb in the United States. Their route has now been free climbed several times in a few hours' time. Other technical routes ascend the south face and the west shoulder.

== Hiking the Cable Route ==
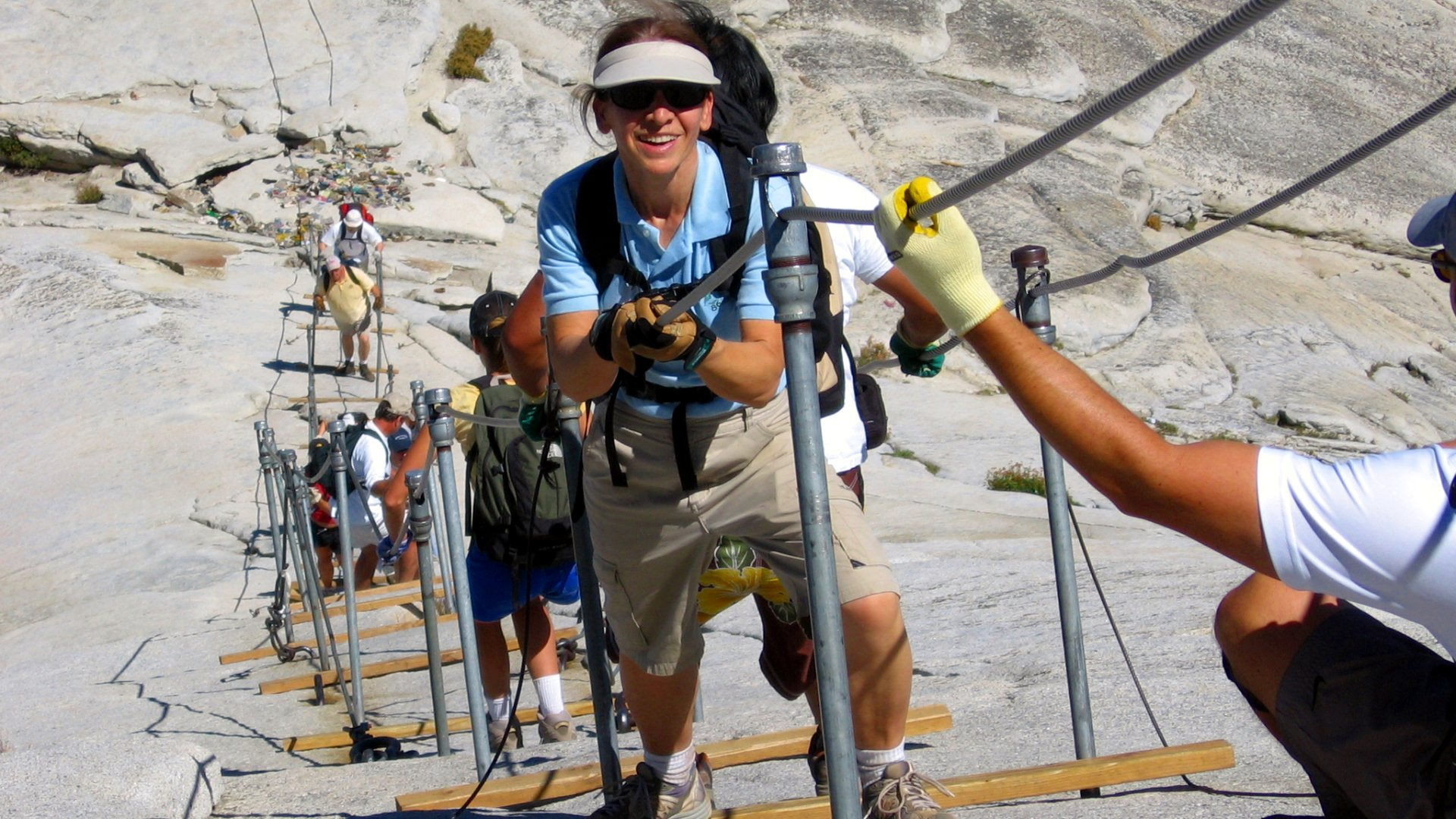
Hikers use cables to ascend Half Dome

The Half Dome Cable Route hike runs from the valley floor to the top of the dome in 8.2 mi (13 km) (via the Mist Trail), with 4,800 ft (1,460 m) of elevation gain. The length and difficulty of the trail used to keep it less crowded than other park trails, but trail traffic grew to as many as 1,000 people a day, and about 50,000 per year, before a permit system was introduced in 2010. The hike can be done from the valley floor in a single long day, but many people break it up by camping overnight in Little Yosemite Valley. The trail climbs past Vernal Fall and Nevada Fall, then continues into Little Yosemite Valley, then north to the base of the northeast ridge of Half Dome itself.

The final 400 ft (120 m) ascent is steeply up the rock between two steel cables used as handholds. The cables are fixed with bolts in the rock and raised onto a series of metal poles in late May. The poles do not anchor the cables. The cables are taken down from the poles for the winter in early October, but they are still fixed to the rock surface and can be used. The National Park Service recommends against climbing the route when the cables are down, or when the surface of the rock is wet and slippery. The Cable Route is rated class 3, while the same face away from the cables is rated class 5.

The Cable Route gets crowded on the weekends

The Cable Route can be crowded. Since 2010, all hikers who intend to ascend the Cable Route must first obtain permits when the cables are up between May and October. Permits are limited to 300 per day. These permits could be transferred to other individuals, and unfortunately due to scalpers purchasing multiple permits they sold out very quickly, later reselling for upwards of $60 per permit. Due to issues with the previous seasons' permit system the 2012 season saw some changes, under the new system permits were non transferrable and were assigned on a monthly lottery. As of 2024, more than 70,000 applications were received in the pre-season and daily permit lotteries. Permits are checked by a ranger on the trail. Hikers without permits are not allowed to hike beyond the base of the sub-dome or to the bottom of the cables. Hikers caught bypassing the rangers to visit either the sub-dome or main dome without a permit face fines of up to $5,000, and/or 6 months in jail.

Backpackers with an appropriate wilderness permit can receive a Half Dome permit when they pick up their wilderness permit with no additional reservation required. Rock climbers who reach the top of Half Dome without entering the subdome area can descend on the Half Dome Trail without a permit.

The top of Half Dome is a large, flat area where climbers can relax and enjoy their accomplishment. The summit offers views of the surrounding areas, including Little Yosemite Valley and the Valley Floor. A notable location to one side of Half Dome is the "Diving Board", where Ansel Adams took his photograph Monolith, the Face of Half Dome on April 10, 1927. Often confused with "the Visor," a small overhanging ledge at the summit, the Diving Board is on the shoulder of Half Dome.

The Cable Route was added to the National Register of Historic Places in 2012.

=== Incidents and risks ===
As of 2024, there have been 10 confirmed deaths on the cable section since they were erected in 1919.

On July 13, 2024, during a sudden rainstorm, a woman was descending, when she lost her footing and slid just beyond her father's reach and tumbled 200 feet to her death. In August 2024, there were calls to double the number of wooden rungs on the climb, to increase safety. Most accidents occur when the rock is wet, and climbers are advised to check the weather before attempting the summit.

Cloud-to-ground lightning strikes can be a risk while on or near the summit. On July 27, 1985, five hikers were struck by lightning, resulting in two fatalities.

== Notable ascents ==
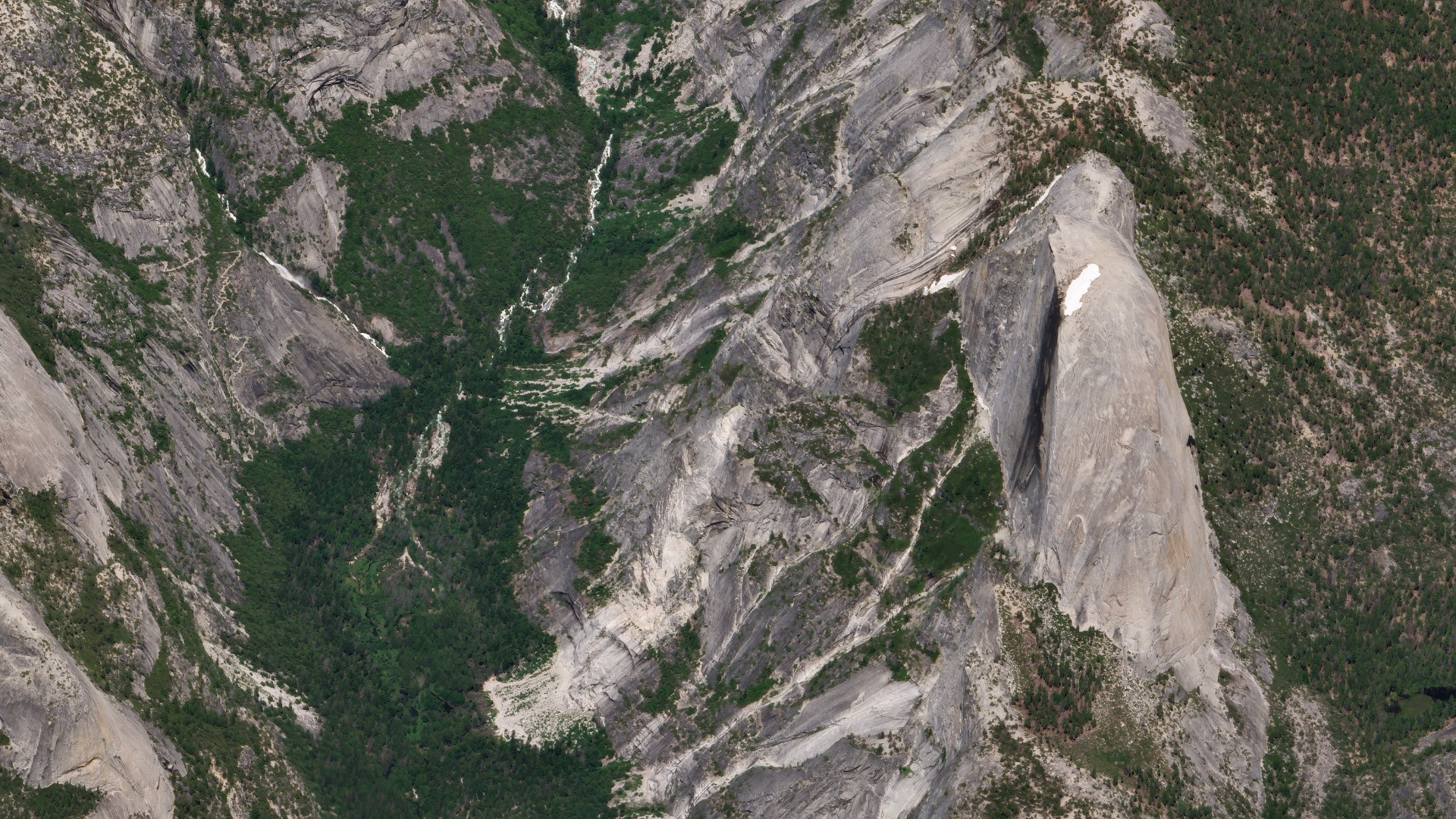
Half Dome and Yosemite, as seen from a SkySat satellite

- 1875 (October 12) George Anderson via drilled spikes on the east slope.
- 1875 (before November 10) John Muir
- 1946 Salathe Route on southwest face (IV 5.7 A3), FA by John Salathe and Anton Nelson
- 1957 Northwest Face (VI 5.8 A3), FA by Royal Robbins, Jerry Gallwas and Mike Sherrick. First Grade VI in North America.
- 1963 Direct Northwest Face (VI 5.9 A5), FA by Royal Robbins and Dick McCracken
- 1967 Liz Robbins becomes the first woman to complete a Grade IV climb when she and Royal Robbins repeat the Direct Northwest Face route.
- 1969 Tis-sa-ack (VI 5.9 A4), FA by Royal Robbins and Don Peterson.
- 1973 First "clean ascent" of NW face by Dennis Hennek, Doug Robinson, and Galen Rowell, Hennek is on the cover of June 1974 National Geographic leading a nut protected traverse see Super Topo too
- 1987 The Big Chill (VI 5.9 A4), FA by Jim Bridwell, Peter Mayfield, Sean Plunkett and Steve Bosque
- 1989 Shadows (VI 5.10 A5), FA by Jim Bridwell, Charles Row, Cito Kirkpatrick, William Westbay
- 1989 Kali Yuga (VI 5.10 A4+), FA by John Middendorf, Walt Shipley
- 1997 Blue Shift (VI 5.11c a4) FA by Jay Smith and Karl McConachie.

== Notable free climbs ==
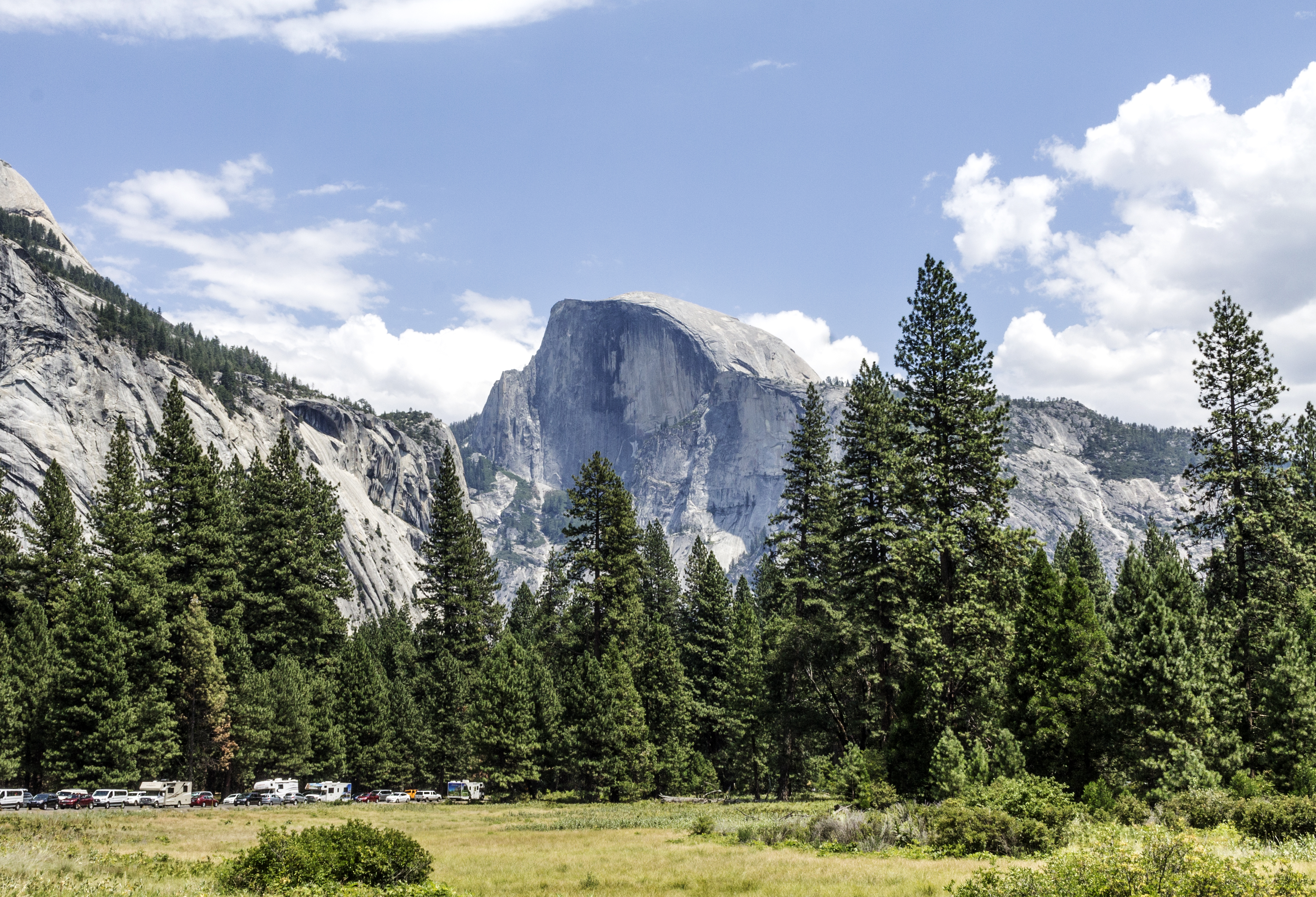
Half Dome seen from the Yosemite Falls Trailhead in Yosemite Valley, California

- 1964 Salathe Route (5.10), FFA by Frank Sacherer, Bob Kamps & Andy Lichtman
- 1965 Snake Dike (5.7), FFA by Eric Beck, Jim Bridwell and Chris Fredericks
- 1976 Regular Northwest Face, Higbee variation (VI 5.12b) by Art Higbee and Jim Erickson.
- 1985 The Autobahn (5.11+/5.12a) by John Middendorf and Charles Cole.
- 1988 Southern Belle (V 5.12d) by Dave Schultz and Scott Cosgrove
- 2008 Regular Northwest Face, Higbee variation (VI 5.12a, 23 pitches), free solo climb by Alex Honnold.

== In culture ==
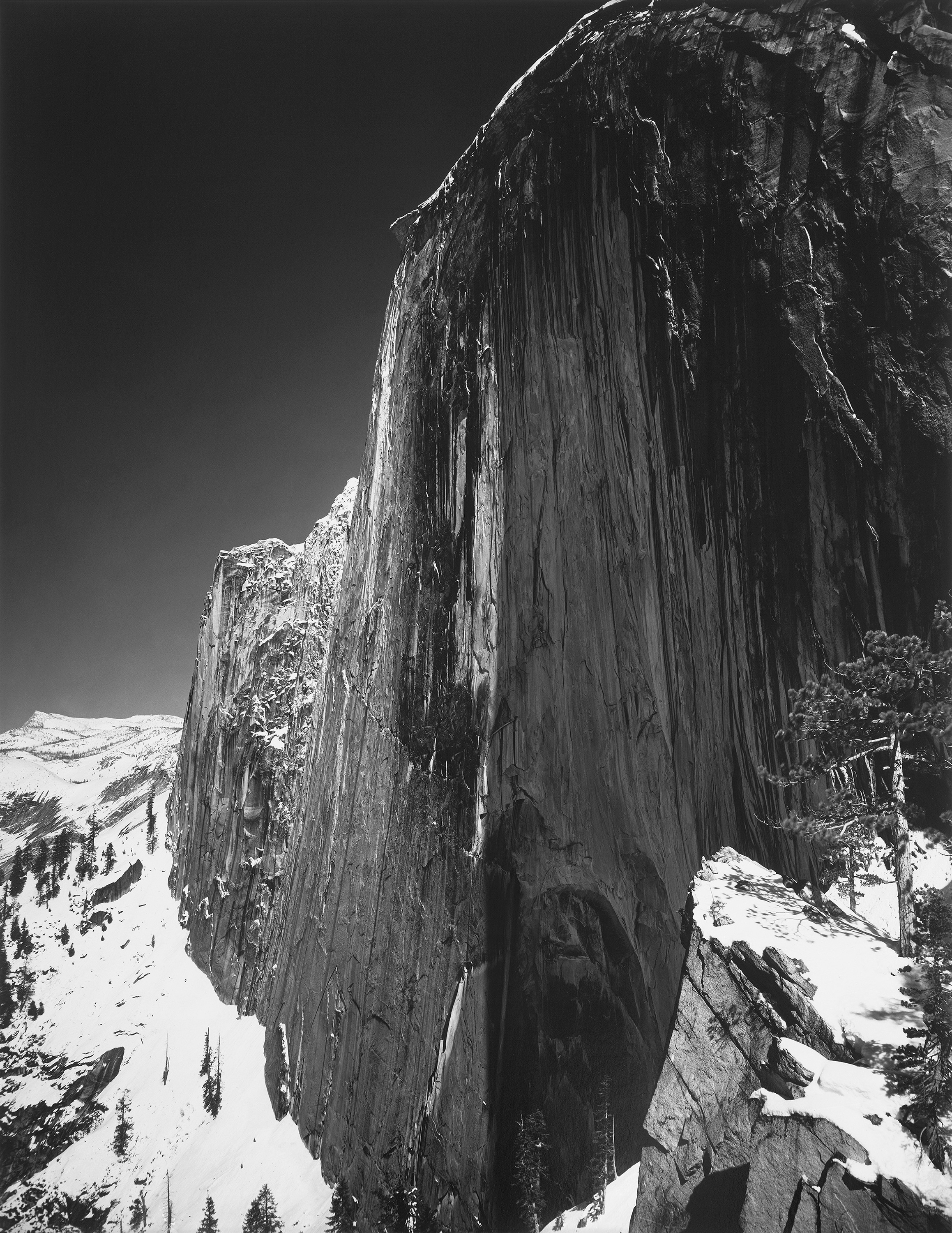
The 1927 Ansel Adams photograph Monolith, the Face of Half Dome

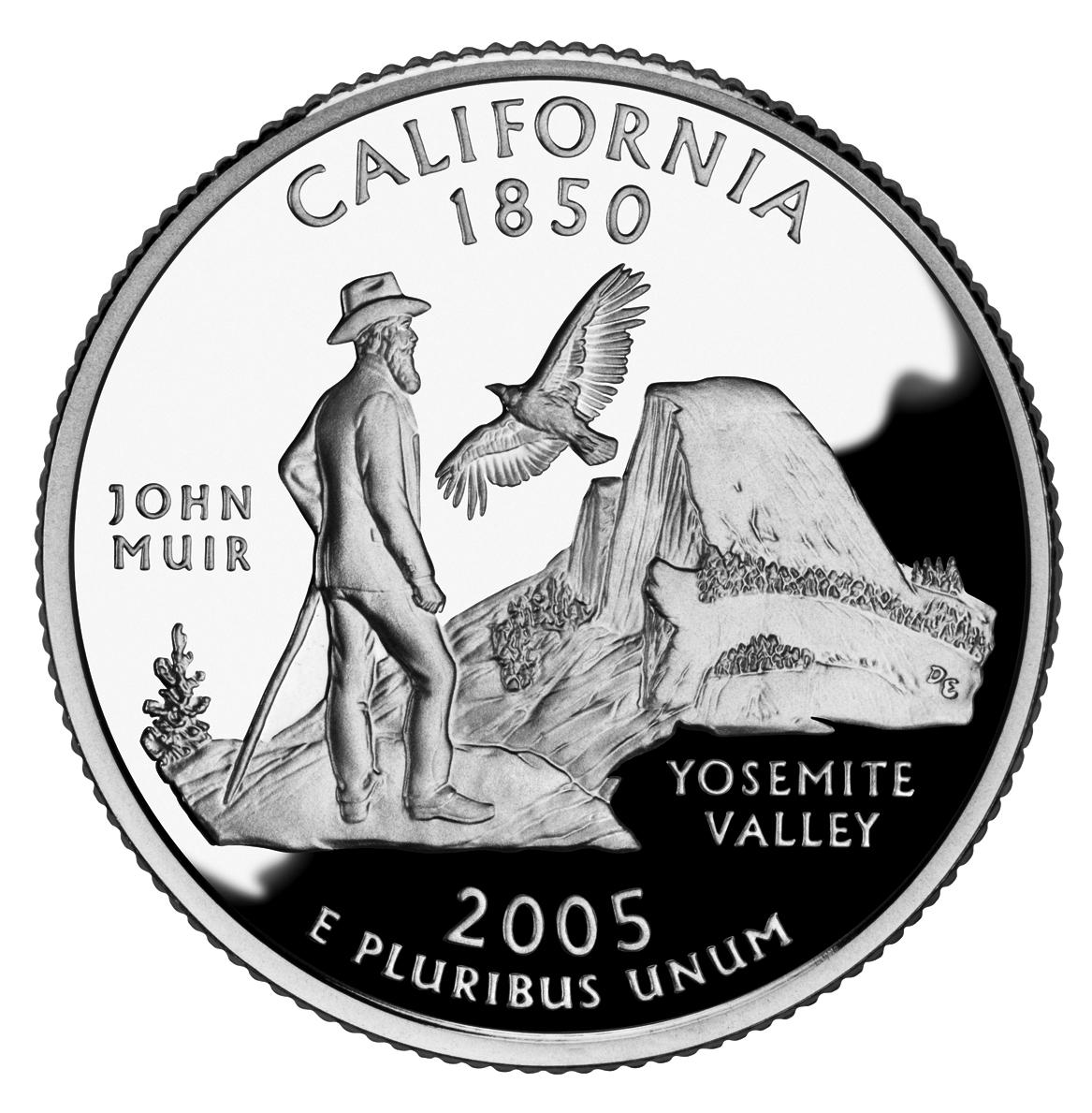
California "State quarter"

Half Dome was originally called "Tis-sa-ack", meaning Cleft Rock in the language of the local Ahwahnechee people. Tis-sa-ack is also the name of the fourth route on the formation, ascended by Royal Robbins and Don Peterson over eight days in October 1969. Tis-sa-ack is the name of a mother from a native legend. The face seen in Half Dome is supposed to be hers. Tis-sa-ack is the name of a Mono Lake Paiute girl in the Yosemite Native American legend. John Muir interchangeably used "Tissiack," "South Dome," and "Half Dome" in his writings.

Others say Ahwahneechee Native Americans named Half Dome "Face of a Young Woman Stained with Tears" ("Tis-se'-yak") because of the colonies of brown-black lichens that form dark vertical drip-like stripes along drainage tracks in the rock faces.

Jack London's 1900 short story "Dutch Courage" tells of a fictional climb of Half Dome.

Monolith, the Face of Half Dome is a black and white photograph taken by Ansel Adams in 1927 that depicts the western face of Half Dome as seen from the "Diving Board". It was used by the Sierra Club as a visual aid for the environmental movement, and was a part of the portfolio Parmelian Prints of the High Sierras. The ashes of Ansel Adams were later scattered on Half Dome after he died.

Half Dome was used as the logo for a software company, Sierra On-Line.

In 1971, outdoor recreation and climbing equipment company The North Face created their company logo, based upon a stylized depiction of the Half Dome formation. It is still their logo 50 years later.

In 1988, the video for the single "Just Like Paradise" was released, featuring clips of singer David Lee Roth rock climbing at Half Dome shot by Emmy Award-winning mountain climbing photographer David Breashears.

Also in 1988, Half Dome was featured on a 25 cent United States postage stamp. An image of Half Dome, along with John Muir and the California condor, appears on the California State Quarter, released in January 2005.

From 2010 until the introduction of REAL ID, California driver's licenses featured an illustration of Half Dome.

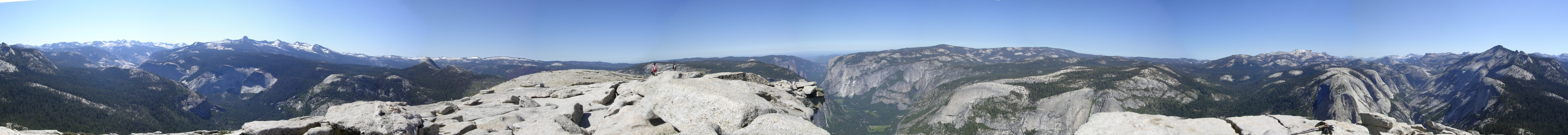
A 360° panorama from the summit of Half Dome, taken in July 2005

== See also ==
- Bornhardt
- El Capitan
- Monolith, the Face of Half Dome, a photograph by Ansel Adams
- North Dome
- Quarter Domes
- Sentinel Dome
