= Wayne Freedman =

American journalist

Wayne Freedman is a former feature reporter for KGO-TV; the ABC owned television station in San Francisco, California.

== Early life and education ==
Freedman was raised in Los Angeles by his parents, Alicia Krug Freedman, a Broadway performer, and Mike Freedman, who worked as a director, producer, and cameraman for ABC for 42 years.

Freedman's education included Hughes Junior High School in Woodland Hills, California. Through his work in the school newspaper, he became published with a regular column in a Los Angeles newspaper at the age of fourteen. Wayne graduated from Chaminade High School 1n 1972, where he participated on the Track Varsity team as a pole vaulter. He worked as an apprentice at KABC-TV while earning a bachelor's degree in political science from the University of California, Los Angeles. He then studied journalism at the University of Missouri, earning a master's degree in 1978.

== Career ==
In the late 1970s Freedman began his television reporting career at WLKY-TV in Louisville, Kentucky before moving to WAVE-TV. Freedman then worked at KDFW-TV in Dallas, Texas and then moved to San Francisco in 1981 to work for KRON-TV. He also worked for the CBS News morning show for a year and a half.

In 1991, he began his tenure at KGO-TV and during his career, his coverage included Russia in 1992 and Hurricane Katrina. Following the September 11, 2001 attacks, he traveled across the United States by train, speaking with people along the way to Ground Zero. In 2006 he repeated this trip to mark the five-year anniversary of the attack.

Freedman is the author of a book, It Takes More Than Good Looks To Succeed In Television Reporting, first published in 2003. In a 2005 review for Journalism & Mass Communication Educator, Lee Hood writes, "Freedman, one of the pre-eminent feature reporters in the country, effectively weaves examples from more than a quarter century of experience in local news (he is now at KGO in San Francisco) and network news (CBS) to illustrate important points about the art of television news reporting." In 2011, his book had been assigned in courses at 50 universities.

Freedman also wrote articles for the Golf Writers Association of America and wrote for the Northern California Golf Guide at KGO-TV.

In 2021, he announced his retirement from KGO-TV.

== Awards ==
- 54 Emmy awards from the Northern California chapter of the National Academy of Television Arts and Sciences.
- 2002 inductee into the Silver Circle of the Northern California chapter of the National Academy of Television Arts and Sciences
- 2021 Governors' Award, Northern California chapter of the National Academy of Television Arts and Sciences
- 2022 Career Achievement Award, Northern California Chapter Society of Professional Journalists

== Works ==
- Wayne Freedman (2017). "Wayne Freedman". In Chimbel, Aaron (ed.). Why I'm a Journalist. Routledge. pp. 123–130. doi:10.4324/9781315229201-31. ISBN 9781315229201.
- It Takes More Than Good Looks to Succeed at Television News Reporting Chicago : Bonus Books, ©2003 ISBN 9781566251884

== Media ==
In 1999, Freedman was featured in the short documentary Wayne Freedman's Notebook by Aaron Lubarsky. In a review for the Chicago Tribune, Steve Johnson writes, "At less than 30 minutes, "Wayne Freedman's Notebook" only suggests what it might have been, an in-depth profile of a haunted but admirable figure and a damning portrait of local TV news painted from an unusual perspective. But it is a vivid and worthwhile illumination of one man with a soul trying to survive within the strictures of a limiting medium."

== Personal life ==
He lives in Marin County, California. In 2021, he said he plans to move to North Carolina with his wife.

== See also ==
- KGO-TV
- ABC News
