= Sonoma (magazine) =

- Editor-in-Chief: Abigail Peterson
- Publisher: Steve Childs
- Country: United States
- Based in: Santa Rosa, California
- Language: English
- Website: sonomamag.com

Sonoma is a magazine published by SMI Media about the Napa Valley and Sonoma Valley areas of California. The offices are in Santa Rosa, California.

== Awards ==
- 2019 EPPY Award (of Editor & Publisher): best digital magazine with under one million unique monthly visitors (tie)
- It received five finalist selections in the 2019 National City and Regional Magazine Awards, with the Missouri School of Journalism managing the award process, bestowed by the City and Regional Magazine Association (CRMA)
