= Betty Grable =

American actress and pin-up girl (1916–1973)

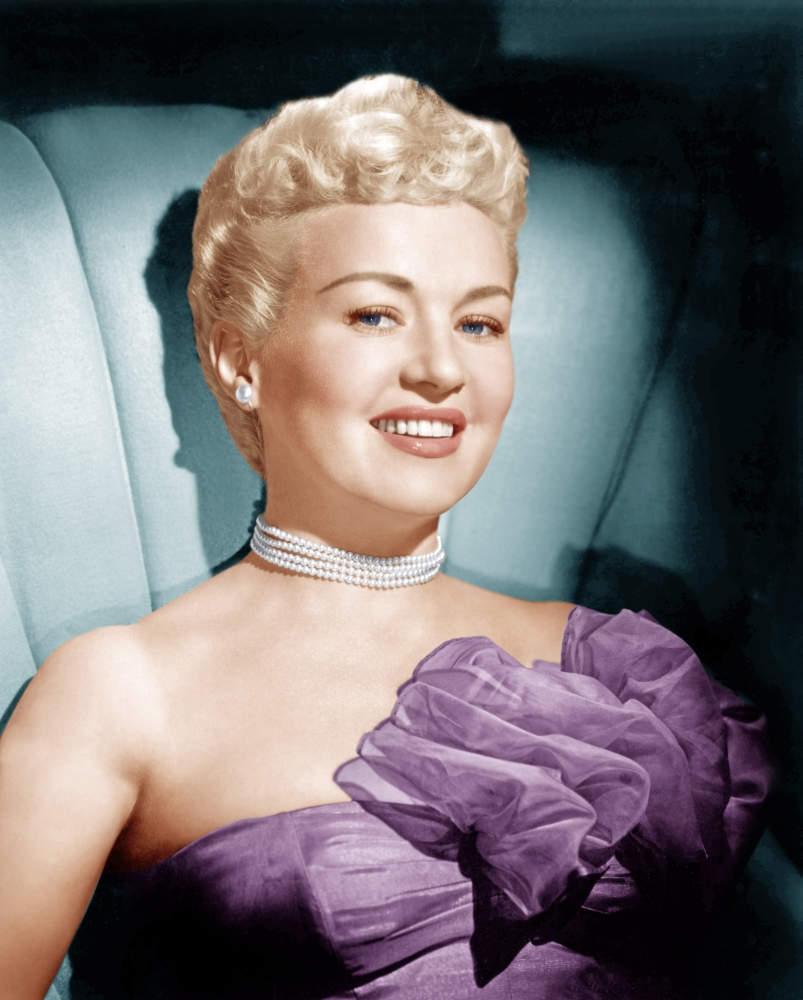
- Grable in the 1950s
- Born: Elizabeth Ruth Grable; December 18, 1916; St. Louis, Missouri, U.S.
- Died: July 2, 1973 (aged 56); Santa Monica, California, U.S.
- Resting place: Inglewood Park Cemetery
- Other name: Frances Dean
- Occupations: Actress; pin-up girl; dancer; model; singer
- Years active: 1929–1973
- Works: Full list
- Political party: Republican
- Spouses: Jackie Coogan (m. 1937; div. 1939) Harry James (m. 1943; div. 1965)
- Partner: Bob Remick (1965-)
- Children: 2
- Relatives: Virginia Pearson (second-cousin)
- Awards: Hollywood Walk of Fame

Elizabeth Ruth Grable (December 18, 1916 – July 2, 1973) was an American actress, pin-up girl, dancer, model, and singer. Her 42 films during the 1930s and 1940s grossed more than $100 million, and for 10 consecutive years (1942–1951) she placed among the Quigley Poll's top 10 box office stars (a feat only matched by Doris Day, Julia Roberts and Barbra Streisand, although all were surpassed by Mary Pickford, with 13 years). The U.S. Treasury Department listed her as the highest-salaried American woman in 1946 and 1947, and she earned more than $3 million during her career.

Grable began her film career in 1929 at age 12 and was later fired from a contract for having signed with a false identification. She studied acting with Neely Dickson at the Hollywood Community Theater. She had contracts with RKO and Paramount Pictures during the 1930s and appeared in a string of B movies, mostly portraying college students. She came to prominence in the Broadway musical Du Barry Was a Lady (1939), which brought her to the attention of 20th Century-Fox.

She replaced Alice Faye in Down Argentine Way (1940), her first major Hollywood film, and became Fox's biggest film star throughout the next decade. Fox cast Grable in a succession of Technicolor musicals during the decade that were immensely popular, costarring with such leading men as Victor Mature, Don Ameche, John Payne and Tyrone Power. In 1943, she was the number-one box-office draw in the world. Two of her greatest film successes were the musical Mother Wore Tights (1947) and the comedy How to Marry a Millionaire (1953), one of her later films. Grable retired from screen acting in 1955 after she withdrew from her Fox contract, but she continued to perform on the stage and on television.

Throughout her career, Grable was a celebrated sex symbol. Her bathing-suit poster made her the top pin-up girl of World War II, surpassing Rita Hayworth. The photo was later included in the Life magazine project "100 Photographs That Changed the World". Hosiery specialists of the era often noted the ideal proportions of Grable's legs and thighs (18.5 in (47 cm)), calf (12 in (30 cm)) and ankle (7.5 in (19 cm)). Her legs were insured by her studio for $1 million as a publicity stunt. Describing her film career, Grable said: "I became a star for two reasons, and I'm standing on them."

== Early life ==
Grable was born on December 18, 1916, in St. Louis, Missouri, the youngest of three children of Lillian Rose (née Hofmann) and John Conn Grable, a stockbroker. Her second cousin was silent-film actress Virginia Pearson.

Her siblings were Marjorie Lucille Arnold (née Grable) and John Karl "Jackie" Grable. The Grable children were of Dutch, English, German, Swiss German and Irish ancestry. Nicknamed Betty as a child, she was pressured by her mother to become a performer. She was entered into multiple beauty contests, winning many and receiving considerable attention. Despite her success, she suffered from a fear of crowds and somnambulism.

== Career ==
=== Early career: 1929–1939 ===
A 12-year-old Grable and her mother travelled to Hollywood in 1929, shortly after the stock market crash. In Hollywood, Grable studied at the Hollywood Professional School and the Ernest Blecher Academy of Dance. To obtain jobs for her daughter, Lillian Grable lied about her daughter's age, claiming that she was 15 to film producers and casting agents. That same year, she made her uncredited film debut as a chorus girl in the Fox Studios all-star revue Happy Days (1929). This success led to chorus-girl roles in Let's Go Places (1930) and New Movietone Follies of 1930 (1930).

In 1930, at age 13, Grable (under the pseudonym Frances Dean) signed with producer Samuel Goldwyn, thereby becoming one of the original Goldwyn Girls, along with Ann Sothern, Virginia Bruce, Claire Dodd and Paulette Goddard. As a member of the group, Grable appeared in a series of small parts in films, including the hit Whoopee! (1930), starring Eddie Cantor. Although she received no on-screen credit for her performance, she led the film's opening musical number, titled "Cowboys".

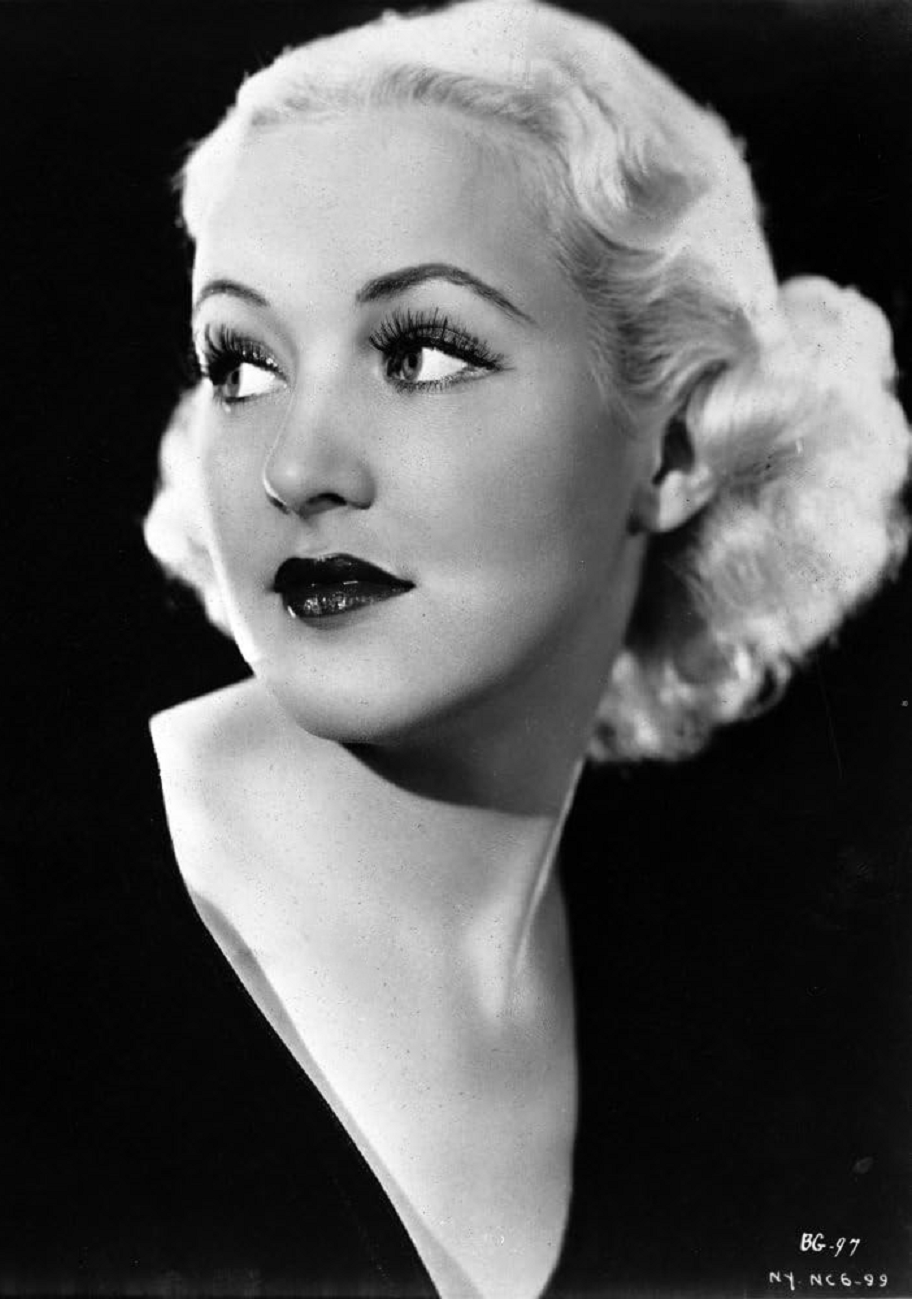
Publicity photo (1935)

In 1932, aged 15, Grable signed a contract with RKO Radio Pictures, and she was assigned to a succession of acting, singing and dancing classes at the studio's drama school. At age 14, her first film for the studio, Probation (1932), provided her first credited screen role. Over the next few years, she was again relegated to uncredited minor roles in a series of films, many of which became worldwide successes, such as Cavalcade (1933). She received larger roles in The Gay Divorcee (1934) and Follow the Fleet (1936).

After her brief stint as an RKO contract player, Grable signed with Paramount Pictures, which lent her to 20th Century-Fox to costar in the adolescent comedy Pigskin Parade (1936). Despite the studio's effort to introduce Grable to the mainstream movie audience, her performance was overlooked by audiences and critics in favor of Judy Garland. When Grable returned to Paramount, she began a new phase in her career as the studio began casting her in a series of college-themed films in which she usually portrayed a naïve student, such as This Way Please (1937) and College Swing (1938). In 1939, she appeared opposite her husband Jackie Coogan in Million Dollar Legs, a B-movie comedy that gave Grable her famous nickname.

When the film did not become the hit for which Paramount had hoped, the studio released her from her contract and Grable began preparing to leave Hollywood for a simpler life. However, she changed her mind and decided to try Broadway, accepting Buddy DeSylva's offer to appear in his musical Du Barry Was a Lady, starring Ethel Merman and Bert Lahr. The play was an instant critical and audience success, and Grable was branded a newfound star.

=== Breakthrough at Fox: 1940–1943 ===
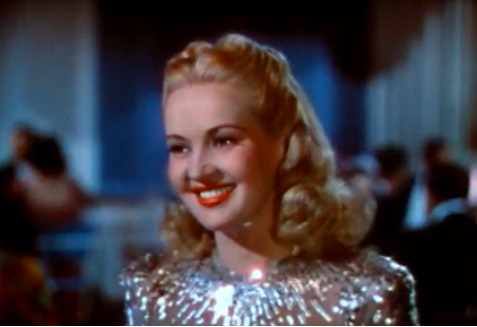
Grable in a scene from Down Argentine Way (1940)

In a 1940 interview, Grable stated she was "sick and tired" of show business and that she was considering retirement. Soon thereafter, she was invited to go on a personal appearance tour, which she readily accepted. The tour brought Grable to the attention of Darryl F. Zanuck, the head of 20th Century-Fox, who offered her a long-term contract. "If that's not luck, I don't know what you'd call it", Grable said in her first interview after signing with the studio. Zanuck, who had been impressed by Grable's performance in Du Barry Was a Lady, was, at the time, in the midst of casting the female lead in the musical film Down Argentine Way (1940). The role had originally been assigned to Alice Faye, Fox's most popular musical film star, but she had to decline the part due to an unspecified illness. After reviewing her screen test, Zanuck cast Grable as Faye's replacement in the movie. The film was a lavish Technicolor musical and co-starred Don Ameche and Carmen Miranda. Grable's performance of the song "Down Argentine Way" is considered a highlight of the film.

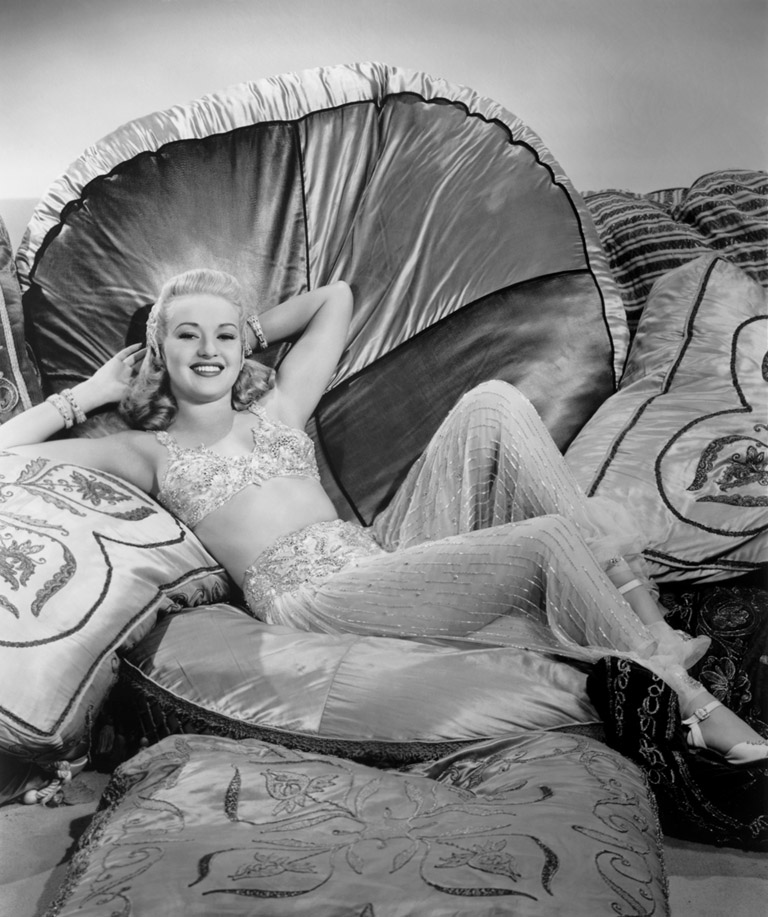
Grable in the film Tin Pan Alley (1940)

Down Argentine Way was a critical and box-office success at the time of its release, and many critics proclaimed Grable to be the successor to Alice Faye. The film's success led to Grable's casting in Tin Pan Alley (1940), co-starring Faye. As the Lily sisters, both Grable and Faye received favorable reviews for their performances. Over the years, rumors have circulated that a rivalry existed between Grable and Faye during filming, but this has been said to be entirely untrue—both actresses denied all accusations of a feud, and each often expressed their admiration for the other. The two reportedly remained friends until Grable's death. After Tin Pan Alley, Grable was teamed again with Ameche in the hit musical Moon Over Miami (1941), which co-starred up-and-coming actress Carole Landis.

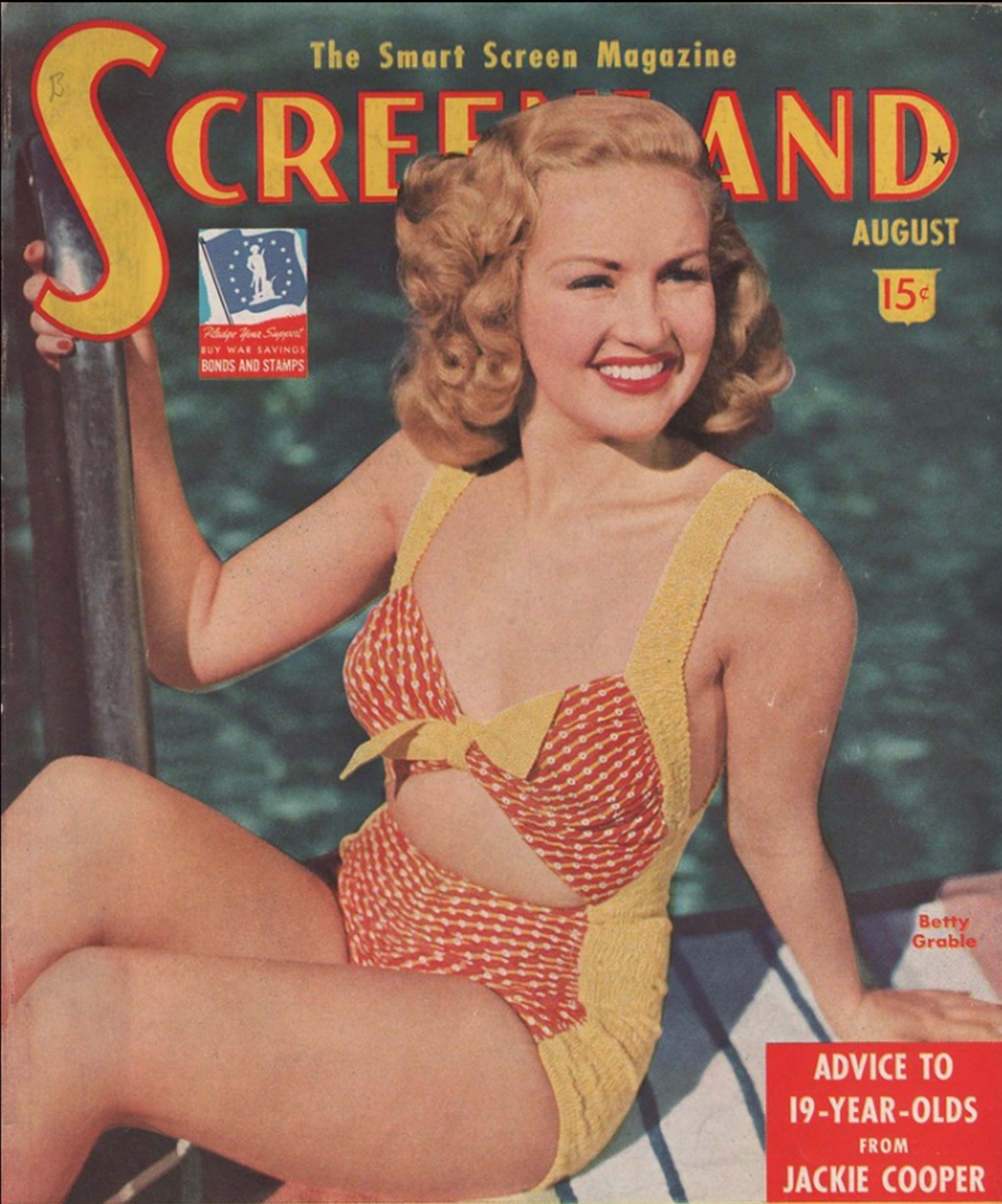
Grable on the cover of Screenland, August 1942

In 1941, Fox attempted to broaden Grable's acting and audience range by casting her in two films with more serious intent than those in which she had starred previously. The first, A Yank in the R.A.F., released in September, co-starred heartthrob Tyrone Power, and cast her as Carol Brown, who works in the Women's Auxiliary Air Force during the day, but is employed as a nightclub singer in the evening. The film followed the lines of other movies of the era, but it was not considered a propaganda movie by the studio. At the time of its release, the film received positive reviews, with many critics singling out the obvious on-screen chemistry between Grable and Power. It was a major box-office success, becoming the fourth-most popular movie of the year.

The second movie, I Wake Up Screaming, released in November, had Grable receiving top billing as Jill Lynn, the sister of a young model who is murdered. The film offered Grable her second teaming with Carole Landis, and it co-starred Victor Mature. Directed by H. Bruce Humberstone, the movie was a traditional black-and-white film noir, containing a combination of suspense and romance. Grable's performance was reviewed favorably by most critics, and the film enjoyed reasonable financial success.

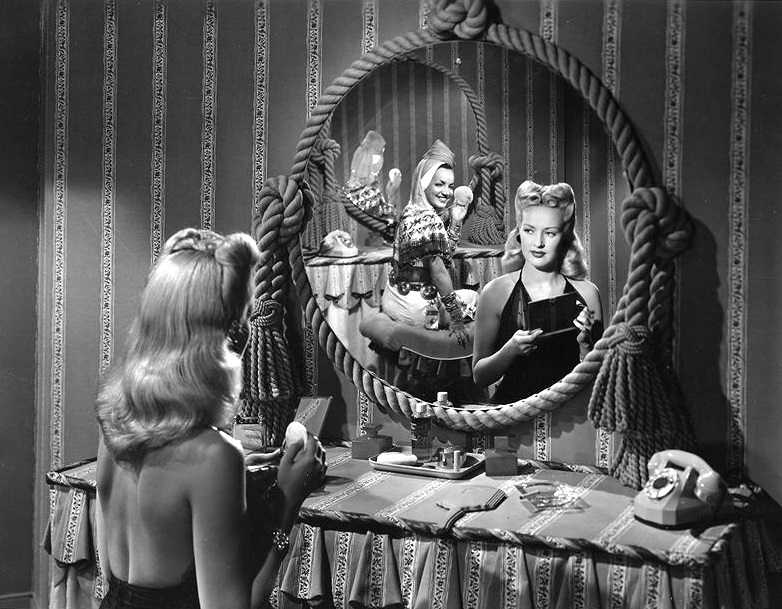
Grable and Carmen Miranda in hit Springtime in the Rockies (1942)

Grable's star continued to rise when she starred in Song of the Islands (1942), co-starring Victor Mature and Jack Oakie. The success of the movie led to her re-teaming with Mature in Footlight Serenade (1942), also co-starring John Payne, in which she played a glamorous Broadway star. Fox then began to develop Philip Wylie's short story "Second Honeymoon", into a script suited for Grable's talents. The resulting movie was Springtime in the Rockies (1942), directed by Irving Cummings, and the featured actors included Payne, Cesar Romero, Carmen Miranda, and her future husband, bandleader Harry James. The film was an immediate hit, Grable's biggest success to date, grossing more than $2 million. The film's success led to Fox increasing her salary and her having a wider choice over the films she made.

Grable was voted the number-one box-office draw by American movie exhibitors in 1943; she outranked Bob Hope, Gary Cooper, Greer Garson, Humphrey Bogart, and Clark Gable in popularity. Coney Island, released in June 1943, was a Technicolor "gay nineties" period musical and co-starred George Montgomery. The film earned more than $3.5 million at the box office and was well received by critics. Sweet Rosie O'Grady (1943), her follow-up feature, was equally successful at the box office, but it failed to obtain the same critical favor.

=== Frank Powolny poster and stardom: 1943–1949 ===
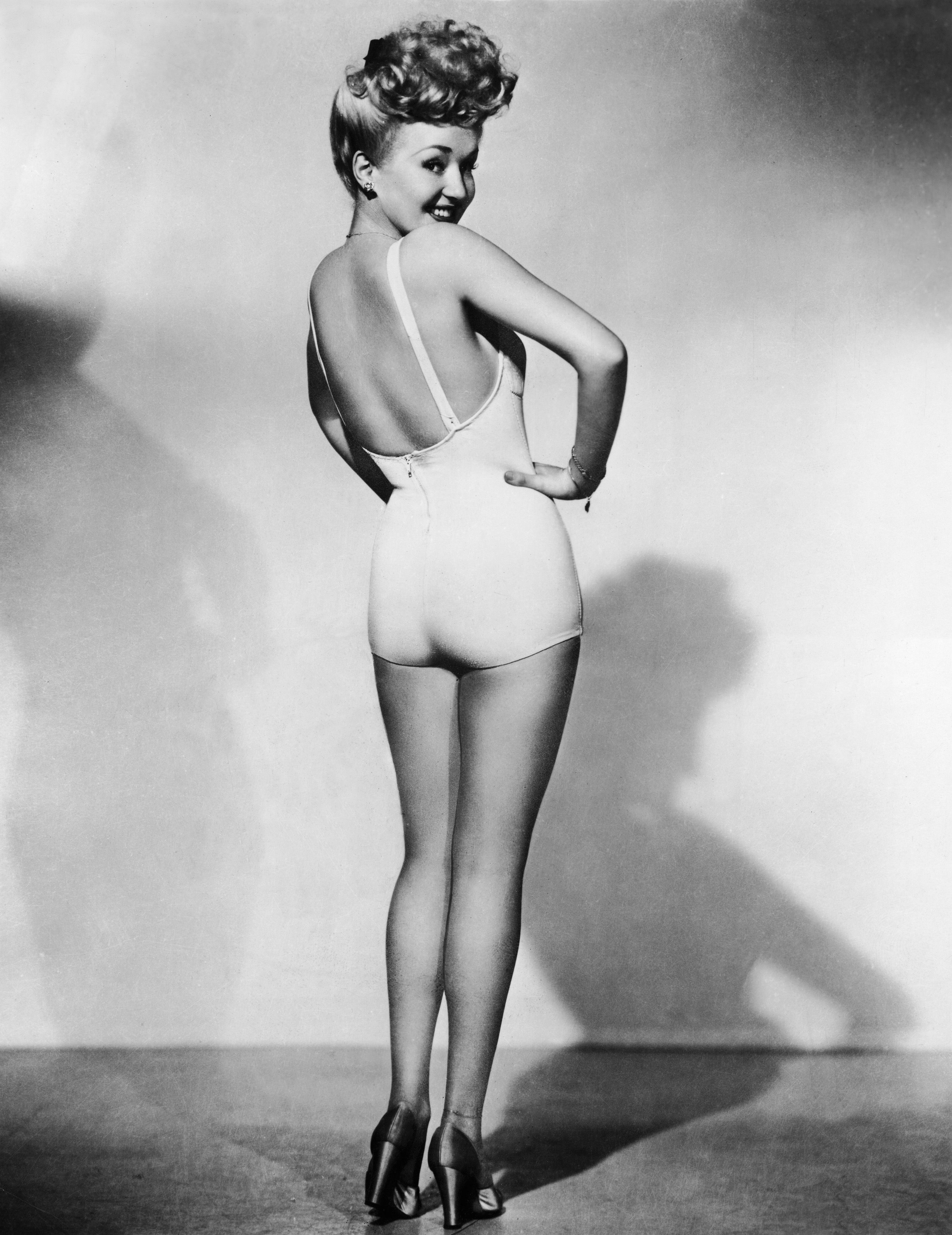
Grable's iconic over-the-shoulder pose from 1943 was a World War II bestseller, showing off her "Million Dollar Legs".

In 1943, she collaborated with photographer Frank Powolny for a regular studio photo session. During the shoot, she took several photos in a tight, one-piece bathing suit. One particular pose showed Grable's back to the camera as she playfully smiled looking over her right shoulder. The picture was released as a poster and became the most requested photo for G.I.s stationed overseas. Grable's photograph sold millions of copies, eventually surpassing the popularity of Rita Hayworth's famous 1941 photo.

Grable's success as a pin-up girl furthered her career as a mainstream movie star. As her star continued to ascend, Fox chief Darryl F. Zanuck expressed interest in broadening Grable's range as an actress. Zanuck tried, on multiple occasions, to cast her in films that challenged her acting abilities, but Grable was reluctant; she felt insecure about her talent and this made her unwilling to accept roles she felt required too much of her. Zanuck relented to Grable's own request not to tamper with her successful screen formula. As a result, the studio prepared a film called Pin Up Girl for her. The film has her as a hostess for a USO canteen who provides entertainment for the troops during their time there. The lavish musical used the pin-up photograph in many scenes, which boosted the photo's sales. Many of the film's later scenes had to be rewritten to hide Grable's pregnancy. Pin Up Girl co-starred comedians Martha Raye and Joe E. Brown and was released in April 1944 to overwhelming success at the box office. Critics, though, were not as accepting of the film. Variety wrote that the film "makes no pretenses of ultra-realism", but also called it "very pleasing and pleasant".

After time off to give birth to her daughter, Grable returned to Fox to star in Billy Rose's Diamond Horseshoe (1945), co-starring Dick Haymes and Phil Silvers. Though the film earned more than $3 million at the box office, it struggled to make a profit because of its high production costs. The Dolly Sisters (1945), her next film, teamed her with newcomer June Haver, an actress Fox was promoting as Grable's successor. Although the press hinted that a tense behind-the-scenes rivalry existed between the two actresses, they both denied it, claiming to be good friends. The Dolly Sisters earned more than $4 million at the box office and was Fox's second-highest earning movie of the year, behind Leave Her to Heaven.

After five years of constant work, Grable was allowed time off for an extended vacation. She briefly returned to filming to make a cameo in Do You Love Me (1946), in which she appeared as a fan of her husband Harry James' character. Grable was reluctant to continue her film career, but Fox was desperately in need of her return. Without Grable's movies, which generated large profits, the studio struggled to stay afloat. The Shocking Miss Pilgrim (1947) was her first film back at Fox. She played Cynthia Pilgrim, a college student who graduated at the top of her typewriting class during the first year of the Packard Business College. Although critics acknowledged that the film "momentarily achieved" brilliance, they also felt that the movie's music was like "sticky toothpaste being squeezed out of a tube". The film also suffered from indifferent ticket sales and lost money. Grable next starred in Walter Lang's Mother Wore Tights, released in September 1947, co-starring Dan Dailey. The film told the story of two aging vaudeville performers as they look back on their heyday through a series of flashbacks. It received critical acclaim from critics and was a box-office hit, earning an estimated $5 million.

Grable was cast in That Lady in Ermine (1948), a film project that had previously been considered for either Jeanette MacDonald or Gene Tierney. It co-starred Douglas Fairbanks Jr and originally was directed by Ernst Lubitsch. After Lubitsch's death early in production, Otto Preminger took over. It was reported that Grable often quarreled with Fairbanks and Preminger and that she nearly walked out on filming, but decided against it on the advice of her agent. When the film was released, it received mixed reviews; it was referred to as "a bright and beguiling swatch of nonsense" and it did not generate the revenue Fox had hoped. Grable immediately thereafter began filming When My Baby Smiles at Me (1948), co-starring Dan Dailey, which became a blockbuster, cementing Grable and Dailey's status as a bankable movie duo. Closing the decade, Grable starred in The Beautiful Blonde from Bashful Bend (1949), an oddball movie that unevenly mixed musical numbers with Western clichés. Despite a casting consisting of Cesar Romero and Rudy Vallée, the film was panned by critics, but it was a reasonable success at the box office.

=== Decline and last films: 1950–1955 ===
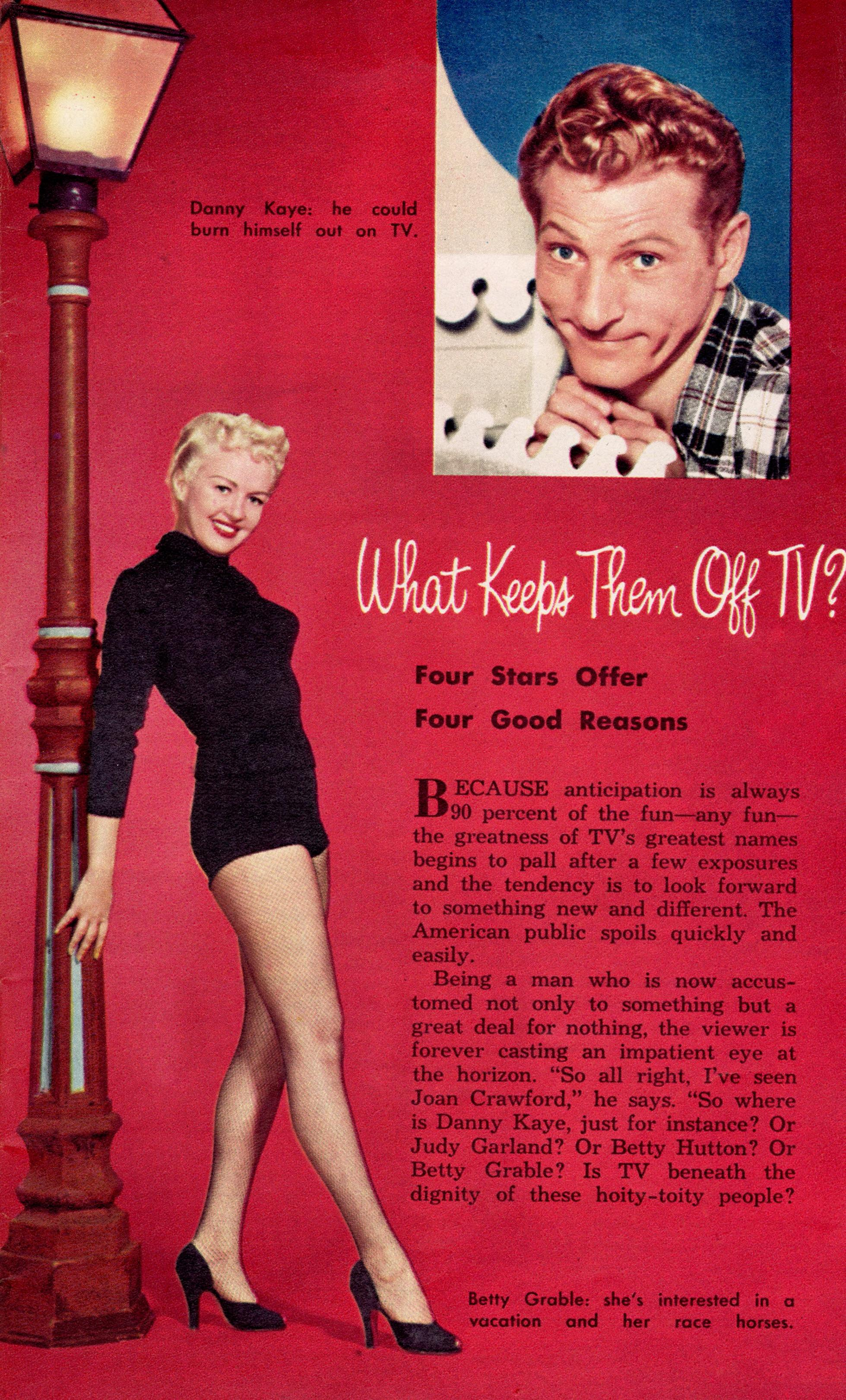
Grable and Danny Kaye in TV Guide, October 23, 1953

Grable had been placed in the "Top Ten Money Making Stars Poll" every year, beginning in 1942. She ranked at the top of the poll in 1943, and ranked second in 1947 and 1948. In 1949, although she still placed in the top 10, she slipped from second to seventh place in popularity. Fox became concerned that Grable might be becoming regarded as passé. Darryl F. Zanuck had the film Wabash Avenue (1950) tailored to fit Grable's talents. The film's plot closely followed the story of Grable's earlier hit Coney Island (1943). Despite the similarities, it had new songs written and dances choreographed to modernize the film. Wabash Avenue was released in May 1950, and was a box-office hit. My Blue Heaven, released in December 1950, re-teamed her with Dan Dailey, and was equally successful financially. In 1950, Grable had regained her status as the most-popular female at the box office; she ranked fourth overall, behind John Wayne, Bob Hope, and Bing Crosby.

Although, by the early 1950s, Grable was searching for originality in the scripts offered to her, she had no luck in finding the movies she wanted to do. She reluctantly agreed to make Call Me Mister (1951) with Dan Dailey, a loose musical remake of A Yank in the R.A.F.. The film was moderately successful and quickly was followed by Meet Me After the Show (1951), co-starring Macdonald Carey, Rory Calhoun, and Eddie Albert. It received favorable reviews from most critics and was a box-office success.

In 1952, Grable began re-negotiating her contract with Fox. She requested a higher salary and the option to make only those films she wanted to do. The studio refused, and she went on strike, which led to her being replaced by Marilyn Monroe in the movie adaptation of Gentlemen Prefer Blondes (1953) and by June Haver in the musical comedy The Girl Next Door (also 1953).

Grable with Marilyn Monroe (left) and Lauren Bacall (right) in How to Marry a Millionaire (1953)

After a year off from filming, Grable reluctantly reconciled with Fox and agreed to star in a musical remake of The Farmer Takes a Wife (1953). The film was an attempt by Fox to recapture Grable's reputation as the studio's biggest star, and although she was paired with Dale Robertson, the film was a critical and box-office flop.

She next starred in How to Marry a Millionaire, a romantic comedy about three models plotting to marry wealthy men, co-starring Marilyn Monroe and Lauren Bacall. During production, Grable and Monroe falsely were rumored to be at odds with each other. Grable, whose career was declining, was assumed to be jealous of Monroe because she was being groomed as Fox's newest star and possibly as Grable's unofficial successor. In fact, Grable and Monroe got along famously; Grable reportedly told Monroe: "Go and get yours, honey! I've had mine!" How to Marry a Millionaire was a box-office triumph when released, grossing an estimated $8 million.

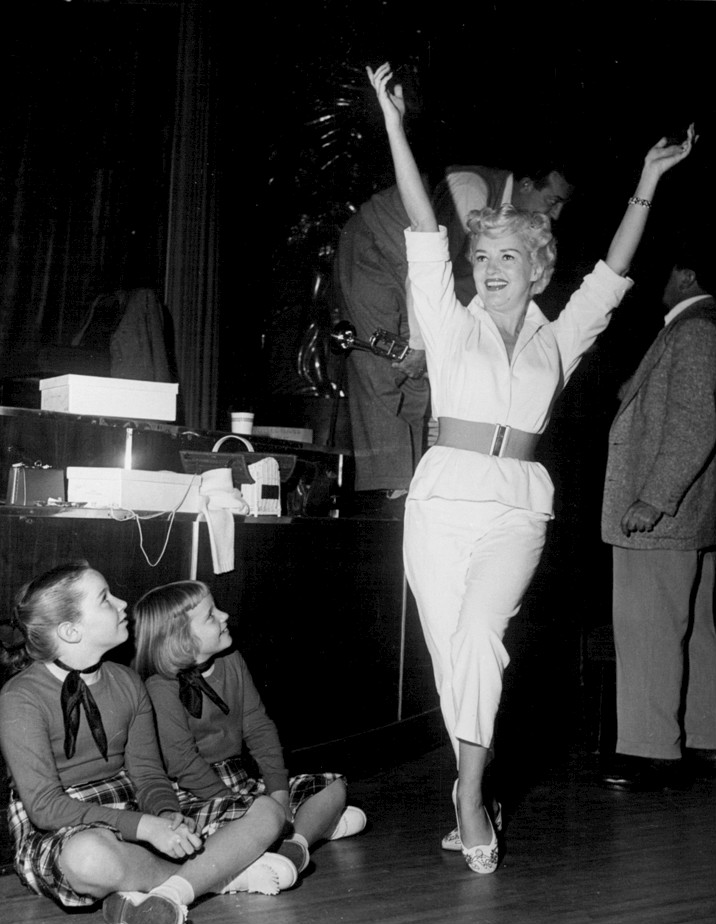
Grable's daughters, Victoria Elizabeth and Jessica, watch her rehearse for her TV debut on Shower of Stars (1954)

After refusing the leading female role in Irving Berlin's There's No Business Like Show Business (1954), Grable again was suspended from her contract. The following year, she appeared in Three for the Show (1955) for Columbia Pictures, her first film made away from Fox in over 15 years, and featuring up-and-coming actor Jack Lemmon and dancers Marge and Gower Champion. Critics called the film a "slight, but cheerful, item", and proclaimed it "does serve to bring Betty Grable back to the screen". It enjoyed reasonable success at the box office, particularly overseas. She agreed to make How to Be Very, Very Popular (1955) for Fox on the assurance Marilyn Monroe would be her co-star. When Monroe withdrew from the production, she was replaced with Sheree North. The release of the film was surrounded by a massive publicity campaign, but despite the promotion, the film failed to fulfill its hype, and critics complained of the lack of chemistry between Grable and North. It was, however, a box-office hit, earning more than $3.7 million. It proved to be Grable's final film appearance. In 1955, she did attempt to return to acting in Samuel Goldwyn's film version of Guys and Dolls (1955). She opted to play the role of Miss Adelaide, but was passed over in favor of Vivian Blaine, who had played the role on Broadway. She then officially retired from motion-picture acting.

Grable thereafter found a new career starring in her own act in Las Vegas hotels and with her husband at the time, musician Harry James. Later, she starred in big Las Vegas stage productions such as Hello, Dolly. She also appeared on Broadway in Hello, Dolly in 1967.

== Personal life and death ==
=== Relationships ===
Grable married former child actor Jackie Coogan in 1937. He was under considerable stress from a lawsuit against his parents over his childhood earnings, and the couple divorced in 1939.

In 1943, she married trumpeter Harry James. They had two daughters, Victoria Elizabeth "Vicki" James Bivens and Jessica James Yahner. Their marriage, which lasted for 22 years, was beset by alcoholism and infidelity, and they divorced in 1965.

Grable entered into a relationship with dancer Bob Remick, 27 years her junior, with whom she remained until she died in 1973.

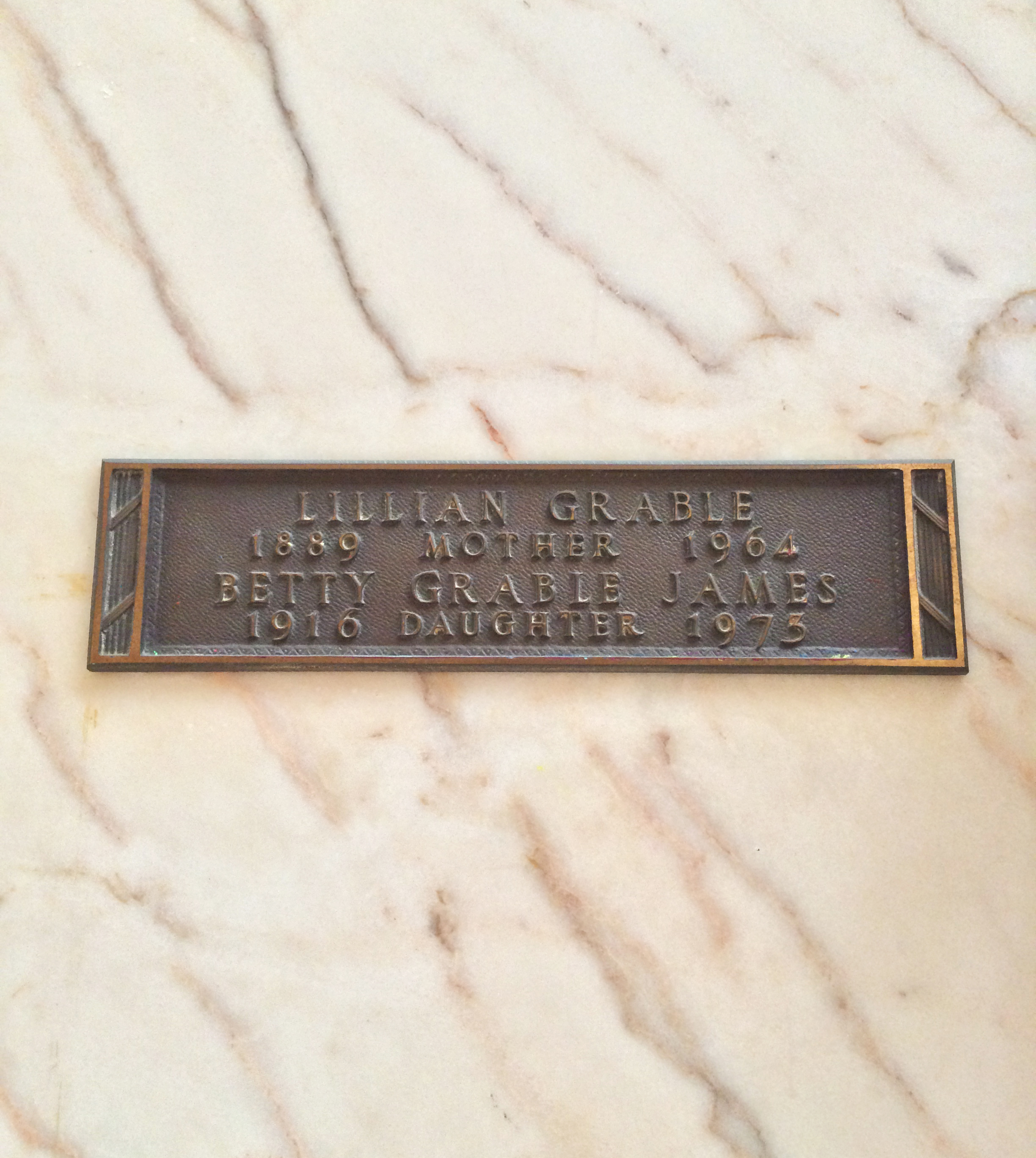
Grable's crypt at Inglewood Park Cemetery

=== Religion ===
Grable was a practicing Episcopalian who emphasized her faith greatly in a personal statement published within the July 1953 publication of Modern Screen Magazine.

=== Death ===
Grable died of lung cancer on July 2, 1973, at the age of 56 in Santa Monica, California.

Her funeral was held two days later and was attended by ex-husbands Jackie Coogan and Harry James as well as Hollywood stars Dorothy Lamour, Shirley Booth, Mitzi Gaynor, Don Ameche, Cesar Romero, George Raft, Alice Faye, Johnnie Ray and Dan Dailey. "I Had the Craziest Dream", the ballad from Springtime in the Rockies, was played on the church organ. Her funeral was held at All Saints Episcopal Church in Beverly Hills, California, where she was a parishioner.

She was entombed at Inglewood Park Cemetery in Inglewood, California.

== Stage work ==
- Tattle Tales (1932)
- Du Barry Was a Lady (Broadway, 1939)
- Guys and Dolls (1962–64; 1968)
- High Button Shoes (1964)
- Hello, Dolly! (Broadway, 1965–67; 1971)
- Born Yesterday (1968–70; 1973)
- Belle Starr (1969)

== Radio appearances ==
Year	Program	Episode/source
1939	The Pepsodent Show Starring Bob Hope	
1942	Command Performance	
1946	Lux Radio Theatre	Coney Island
1949	Suspense	The Copper Tea Strainer
1950	Screen Directors Playhouse	When My Baby Smiles at Me
1952	Lux Radio Theatre	My Blue Heaven

== Cultural depictions and legacy ==
- Two war films set during December, 1944, make reference to Grable's 1943 marriage to Harry James:
  - Battleground (1949), set during the Battle of the Bulge, references the marriage when members of a 101st Airborne Division squad (who are suspicious after having encountered German soldiers dressed as American G.I.s) ask for extra information during a contentious password challenge.
  - In Stalag 17 (1953), a POW character is infatuated with Grable and has photos of her hanging over his bunk. He is melancholic when he mentions that she has married "some orchestra leader."

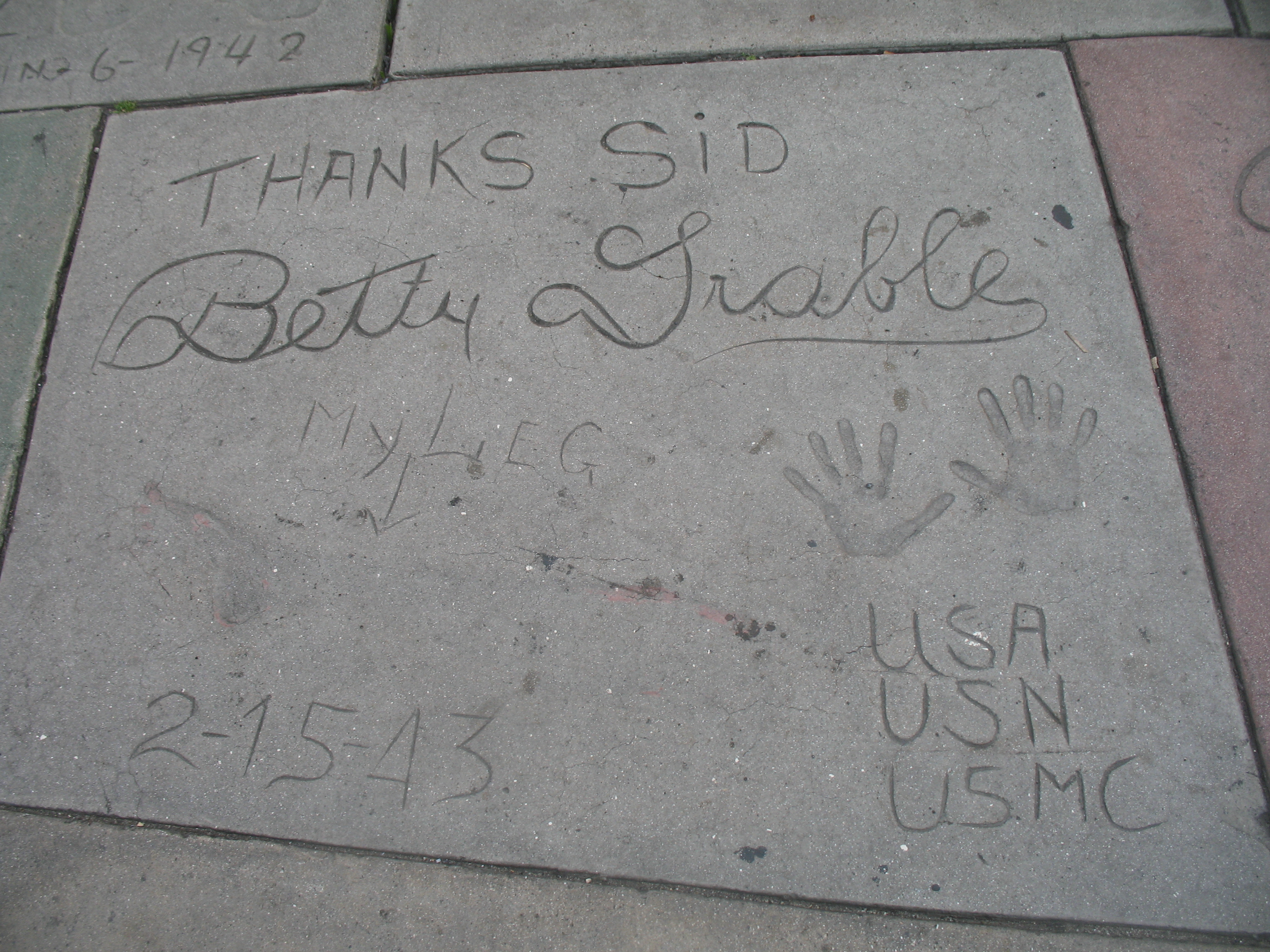
Grable's handprint/signature in front of the Grauman's Chinese Theatre

- Neil Sedaka 1974's song : Betty Grable
- In the Our Miss Brooks episode "Lulu, the Pin-Up Boat", Mitchell mistakes the pin-up photo of Grable that Conklin confiscated from Walter and put into his desk drawer with Connie and Conklin's discussion about Conklin's boat Lulu.
- Grable has a star on the Hollywood Walk of Fame at 6525 Hollywood Boulevard. She also has a star on the St. Louis Walk of Fame.
- She was inducted into the Hall of Famous Missourians. Her iconic pin-up image was named one of Time's 100 Most Influential Photographs of All Time.
- In 2003, she was included in the list of 100 Photographs That Changed the World by Life.
- A few months following her death, Grable was memorialized in song by Neil Sedaka on a track from his 1974 LP Laughter in the Rain.
- Nose art featuring her is painted on the Boeing B-17 Flying Fortress Sentimental Journey.
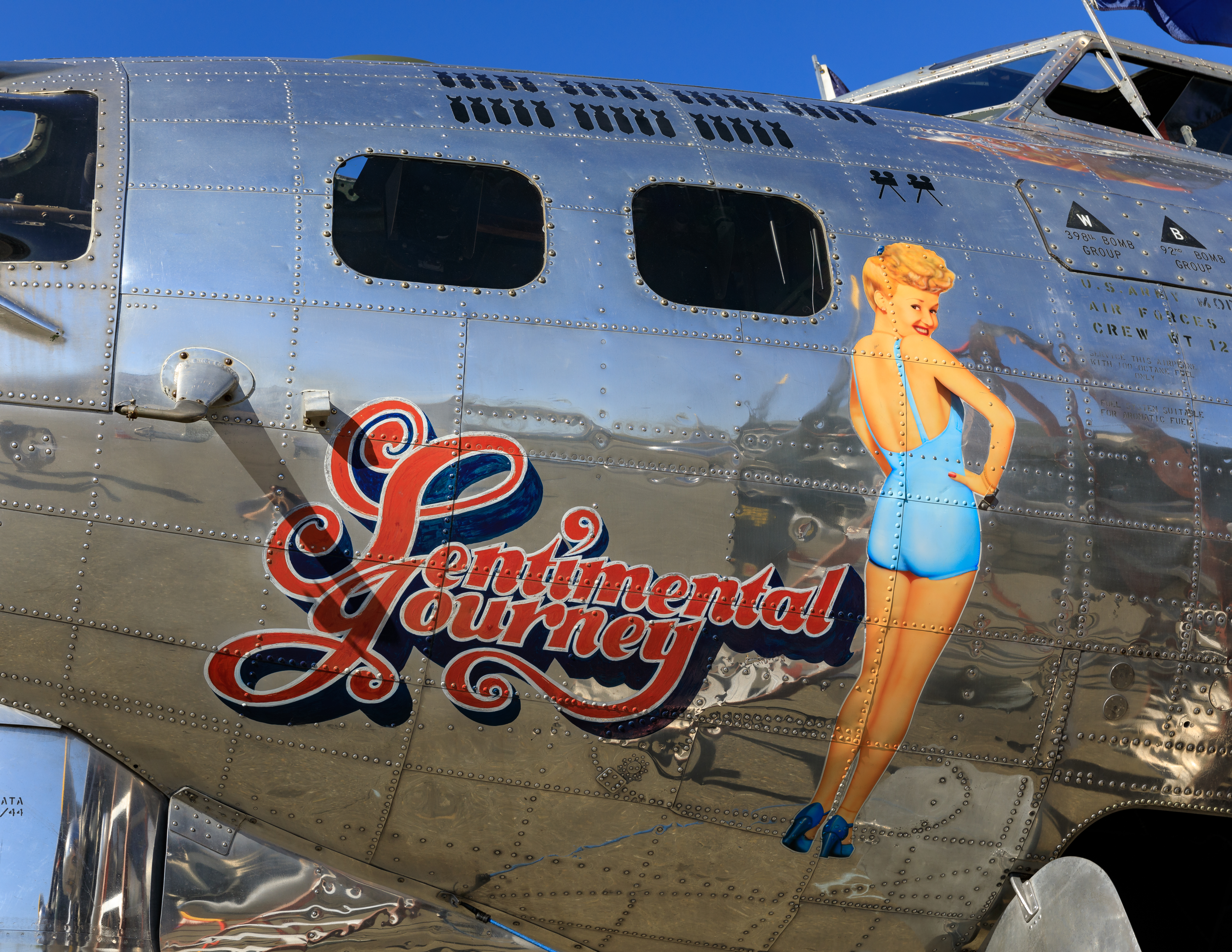
  Close-up of nose art.
- In the American television sitcom Community, Grable is referenced by elderly student Pierce Hawthorne who mentions her full name in an attempt to say something "awesome" to his classmates Troy and Abed, both of whom are some 40 years his junior.

== Biographies on Betty Grable ==
- Billman, Larry (1993). Betty Grable : A Bio-bibliography. Westport, Conn: Greenwood Press. ISBN 9780313281563.
- McGee, Tom (1994). Betty Grable: The Girl with the Million Dollar Legs. Vestal Press. ISBN 978-1-879511-15-6.
- Warren, Doug (1981). Betty Grable : The Reluctant Movie Queen (1st ed.). New York: St. Martin's Press. ISBN 9780312077327.

== Sources ==
- Sicherman, Barbara; Green, Carol Hurd (1980). Notable American Women - The Modern Period : a Biographical Dictionary. Belknap Press of Harvard University Press. ISBN 978-0-674-62733-8.
- Hill, Constance Valis (2014). Tap Dancing America : A Cultural History. Oxford University Press. ISBN 978-0-19-022538-4.
- Bradley, Edwin M. (2004). The First Hollywood Musicals : A Critical Filmography of 171 Features, 1927 Through 1932. McFarland. ISBN 9780786420292.
- Ciment, James; Russell, Thaddeus, eds. (2007). The Home Front Encyclopedia: United States, Britain, and Canada in World War II. Vol. 1. ABC-CLIO. ISBN 9781576078495.
- Parish, James Robert; Pitts, Michael R. (2003). Hollywood Songsters: Garland to O'Connor. Vol. 2. New York: Taylor & Francis. ISBN 978-0-415-94333-8.
