= 100 Photographs that Changed the World =

2003 book by Life magazine

- Front Cover
- Author: Editors of Life
- Language: English
- Published: August 1, 2003 (Time, Inc.)
- Publication place: United States
- Media type: Print (hardback)
- ISBN: 1-931933-84-7

Life: 100 Photographs that Changed The World is a book of photographs, that are believed to have pushed towards a change, accumulated by the editors of Life magazine in 2003.

== History ==
The project began with an online question posted on Life's website in 2003 and The Digital Journalist: Can photographs create the same historical effect as literature? The question remained on the website for visitors to openly answer to for several weeks. Most responses were in favor of the idea with the exception of a rebuttal from documentary photographer Joshua Haruni who said, "photographs can definitely inspire us, but the written word has the ability to spark the imagination to greater depths than any photograph, whose content is limited to what exists in the frame."

Life determined that "a collection of pictures that 'changed the world' is a thing worth contemplating, if only to arrive at some resolution about the influential nature of photography and whether it is limited, vast or in between." Pictures nominated by the public were reviewed by editors who then compiled 100 photographs that they felt portrayed technological photographic achievements, documented historic events and accomplishments or have achieved iconic cultural and, symbolic status. The book was edited by Robert Sullivan and picture editor Barbara Baker Burrows, and published by Time, Inc. Home Entertainment. An updated edition of the book was published August 9, 2011.

== Sections ==
The work is divided into four major chapters and three accompanying subsections. The major quarters are:

- The Arts (concentrating on photography's evolution throughout the 19th century and its later application to cultural exploitation);
- Society (documenting images that captured moments that shifted public acquaintance with political, social, cultural and environmental issues);
- War (pivotal moments of conflict and associated violence); and
- Science and Nature (capturing technological triumphs, defeats and horrors).

The three subsections are:

- Photographic Art (early works of artists whose primary medium was photography);
- Trick Photography (infamous scams perpetrated through photographs); and
- Stop Action (photos that are in fact captures taken from film).

== Photographs ==
Some of the included photos are identified with larger events, such as H.S. Wong's 1937 photograph of a lone child crying at a demolished train station on "Bloody Saturday" as representative of the entire bombing of Shanghai. Other photographs are excerpts from larger historic collections, such as Roger Fenton's and Alexander Gardner's respective groundbreaking documentations of the Crimean War and American Civil War. Margin notes document the circumstantial background of many photographs, as well as instances where the images have been accused of being staged.

== Gallery ==
Some of the photos are depicted below. Only images in the public domain in the US can be displayed here.

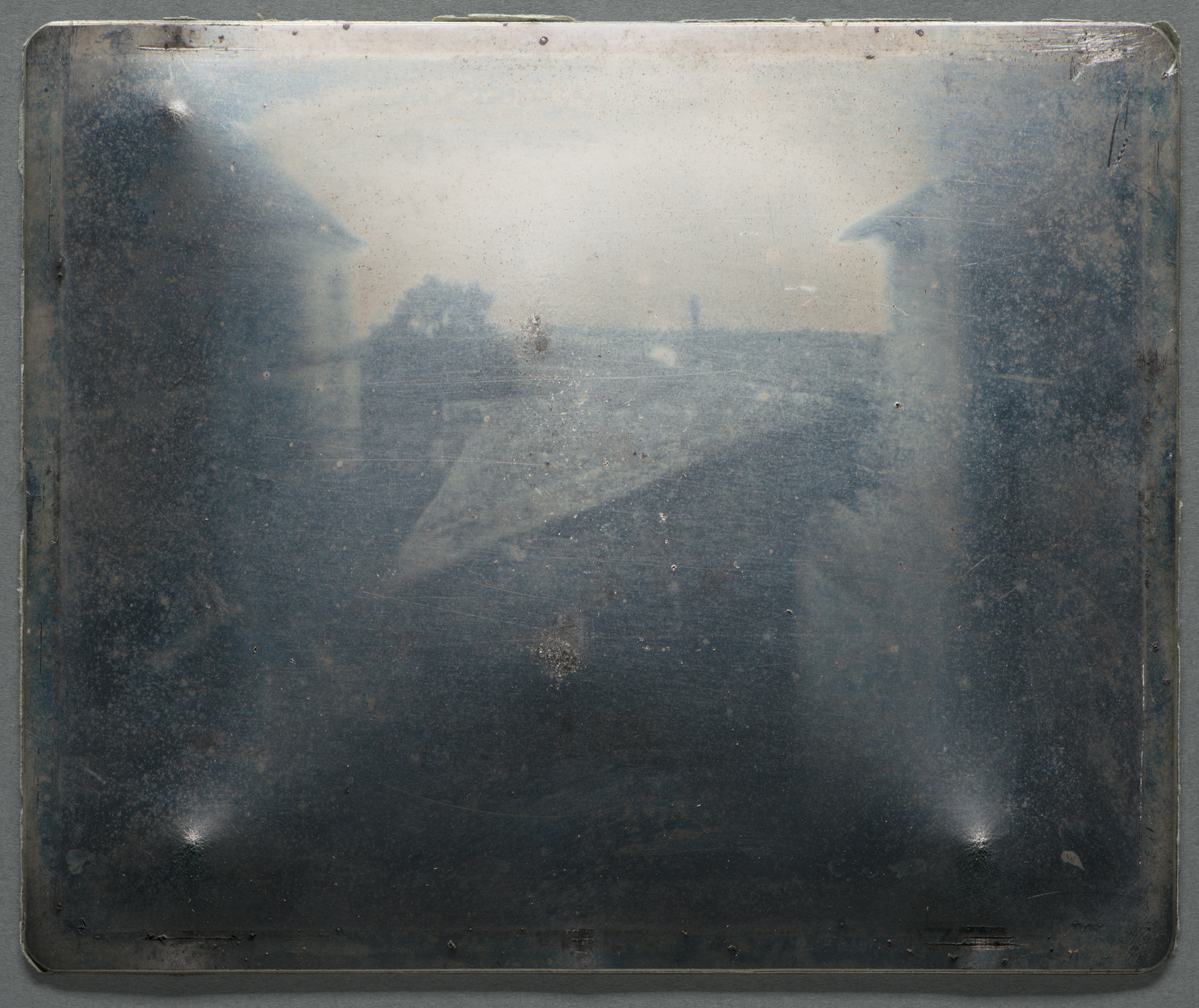
View from the Window at Le Gras, 1826

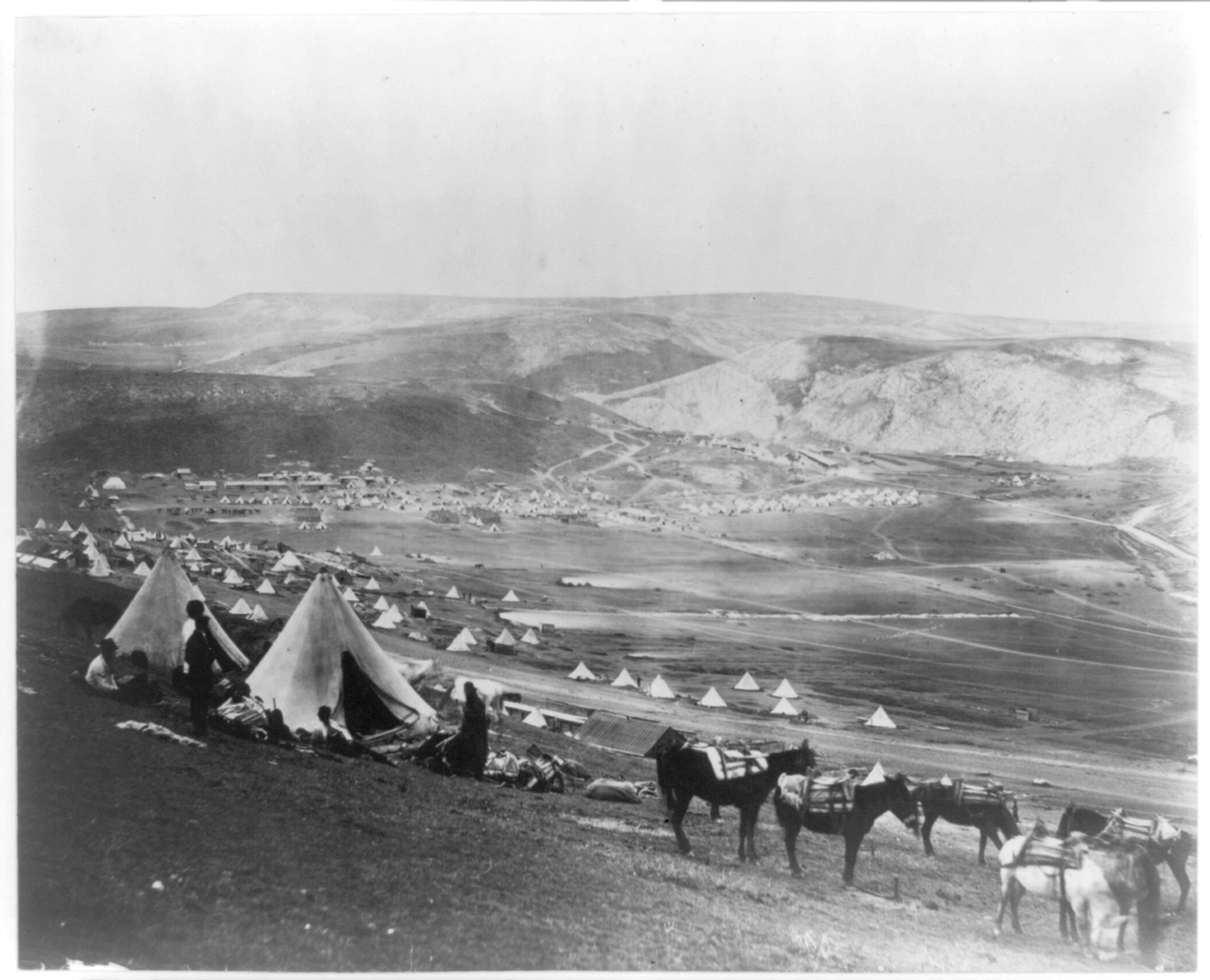
Cavalry camp near Balaklava – Crimean War, 1855

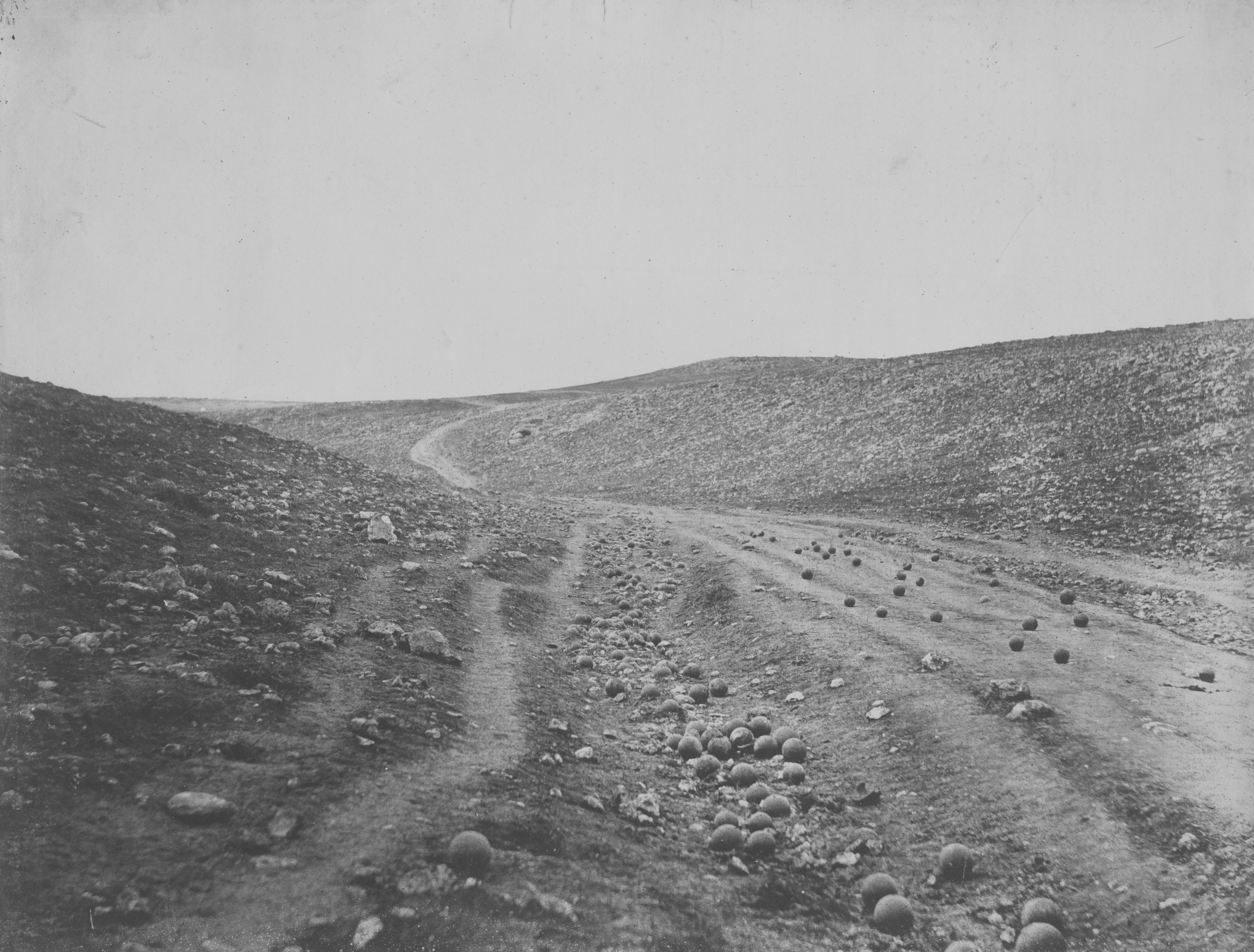
The Valley of the Shadow of Death – Siege of Sevastopol, Crimean War, 1855

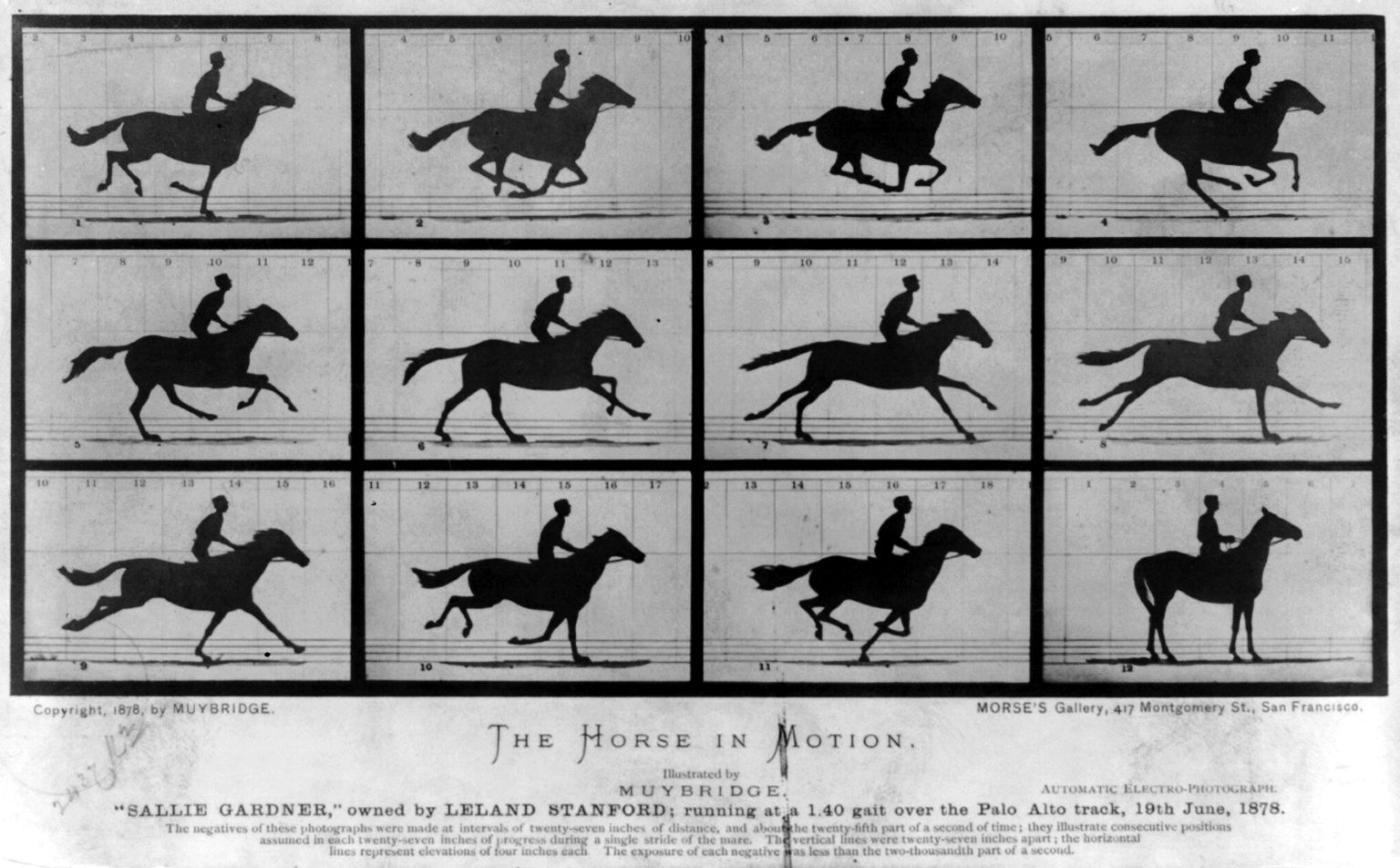
The Horse in Motion, 1878

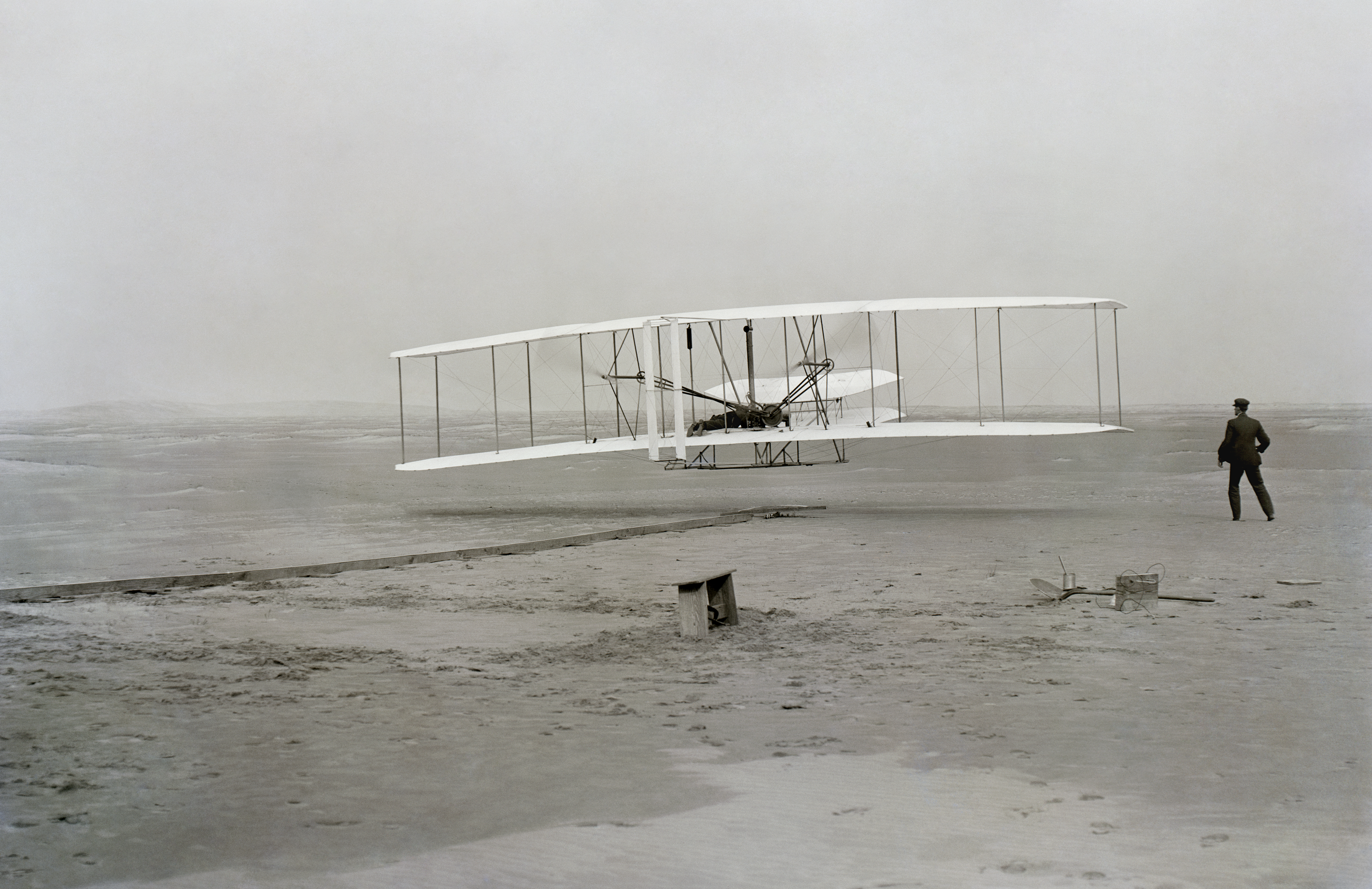
First successful flight by the Wright brothers, 1903

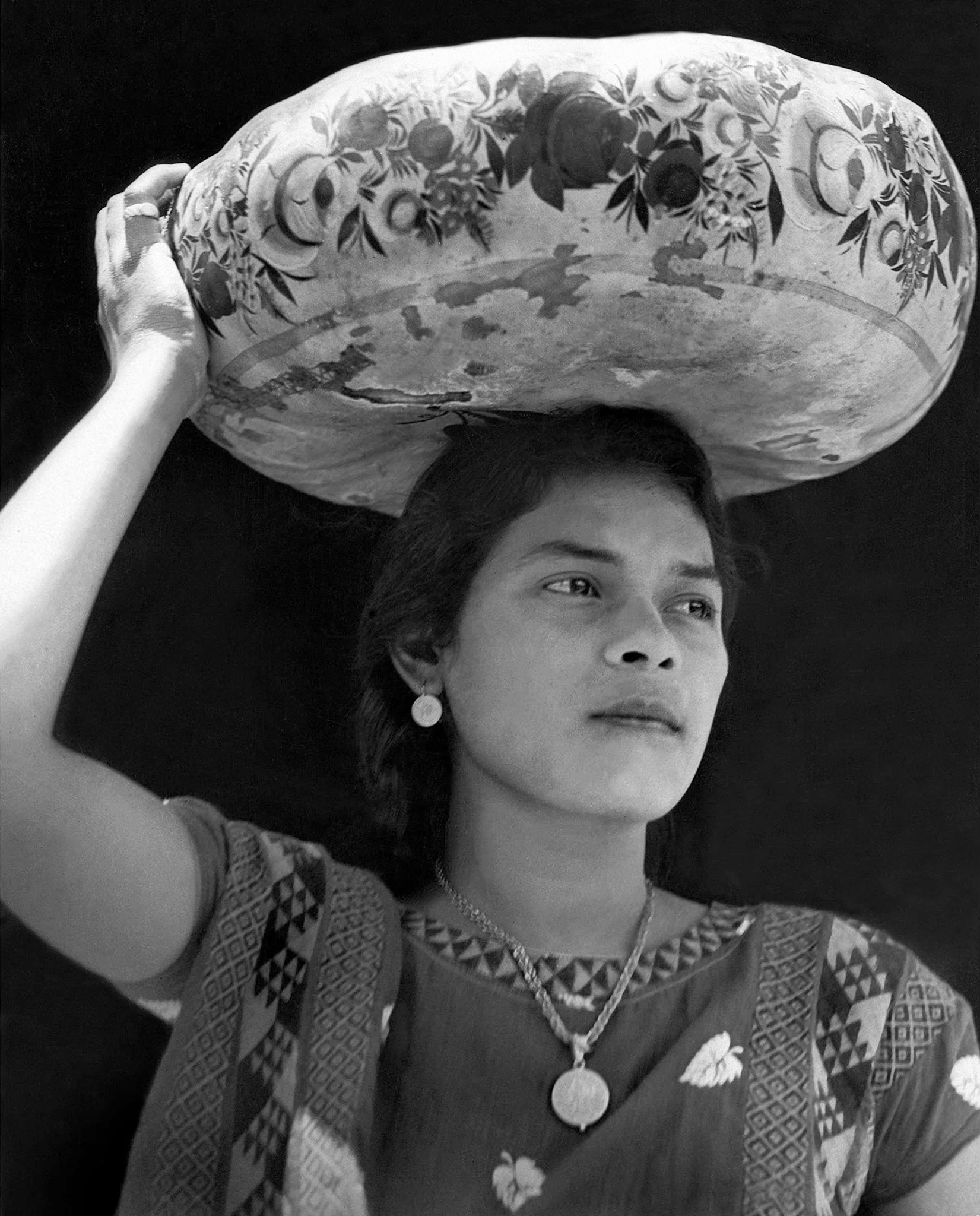
Woman of Tehuantepec by Tina Modotti, 1929

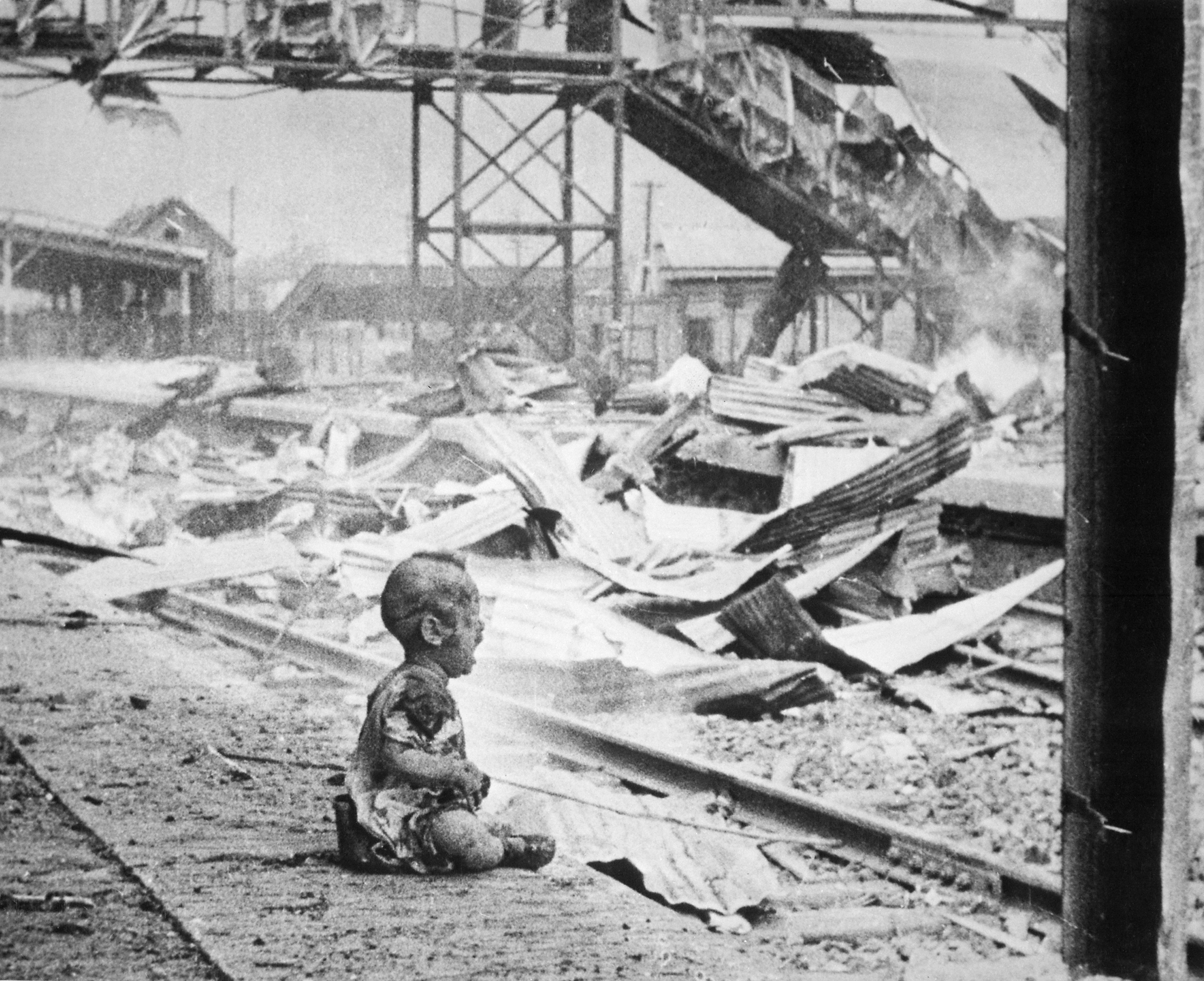
Bloody Saturday – Battle of Shanghai, 1937

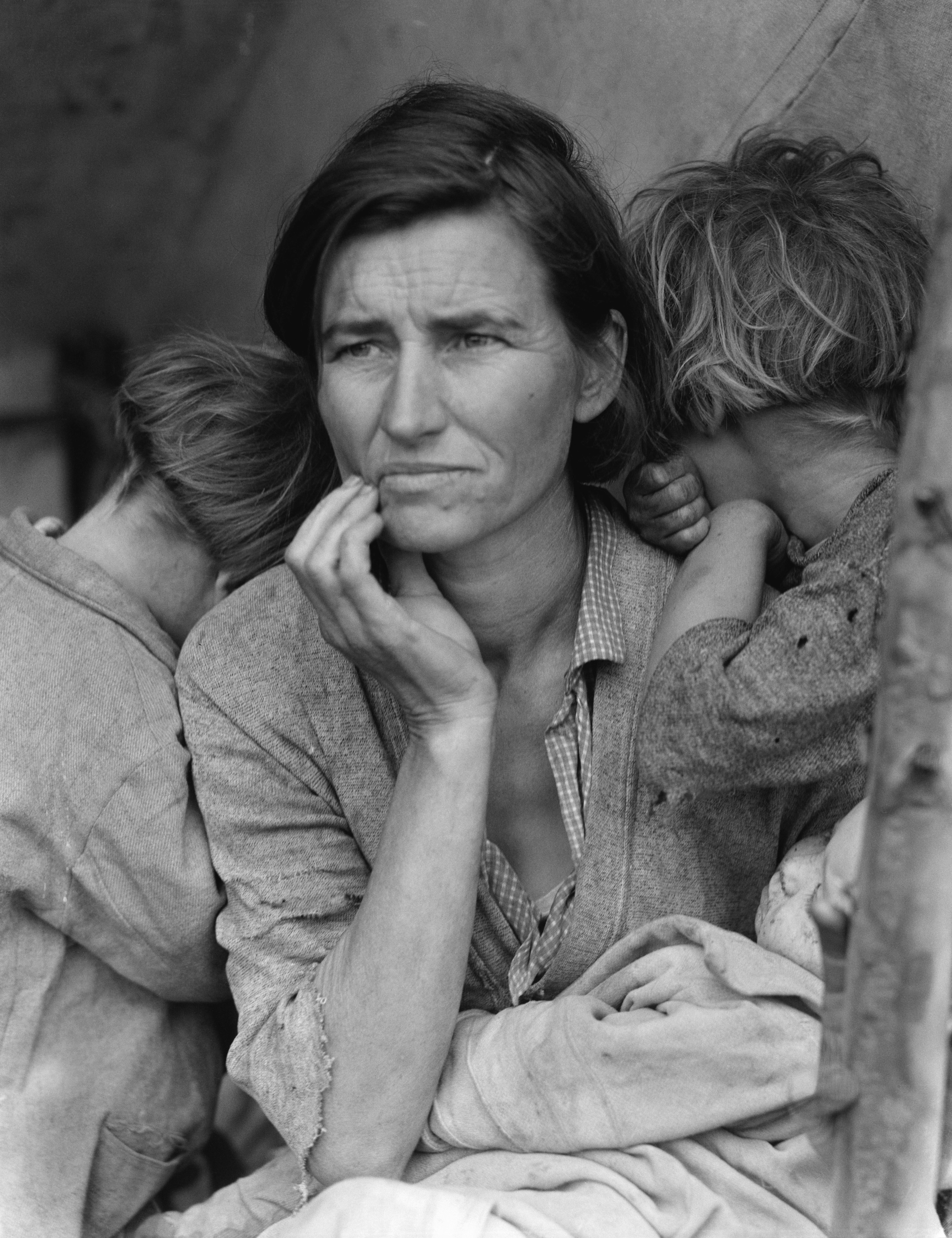
Migrant Mother, 1936

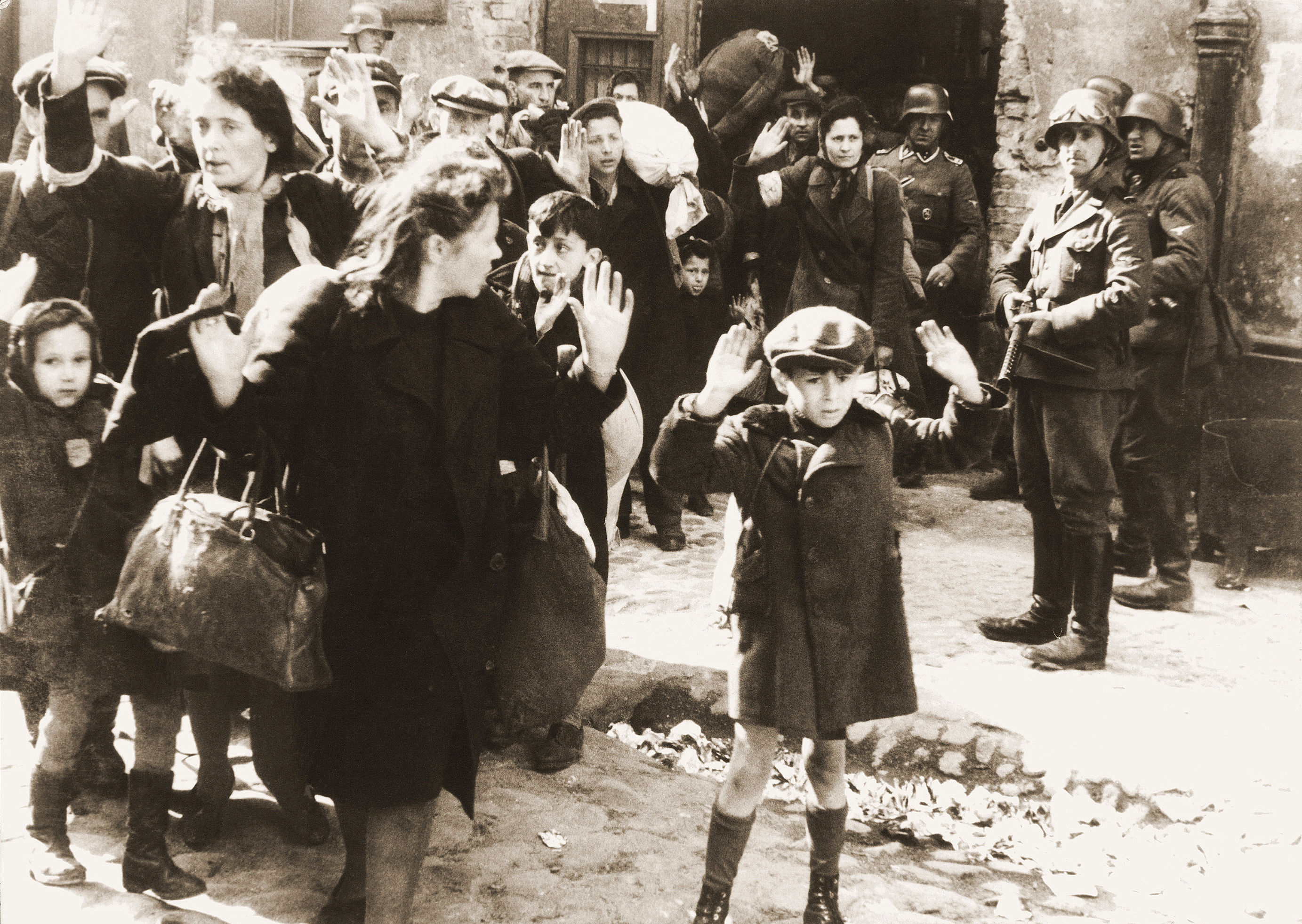
Warsaw Ghetto Uprising, 1943

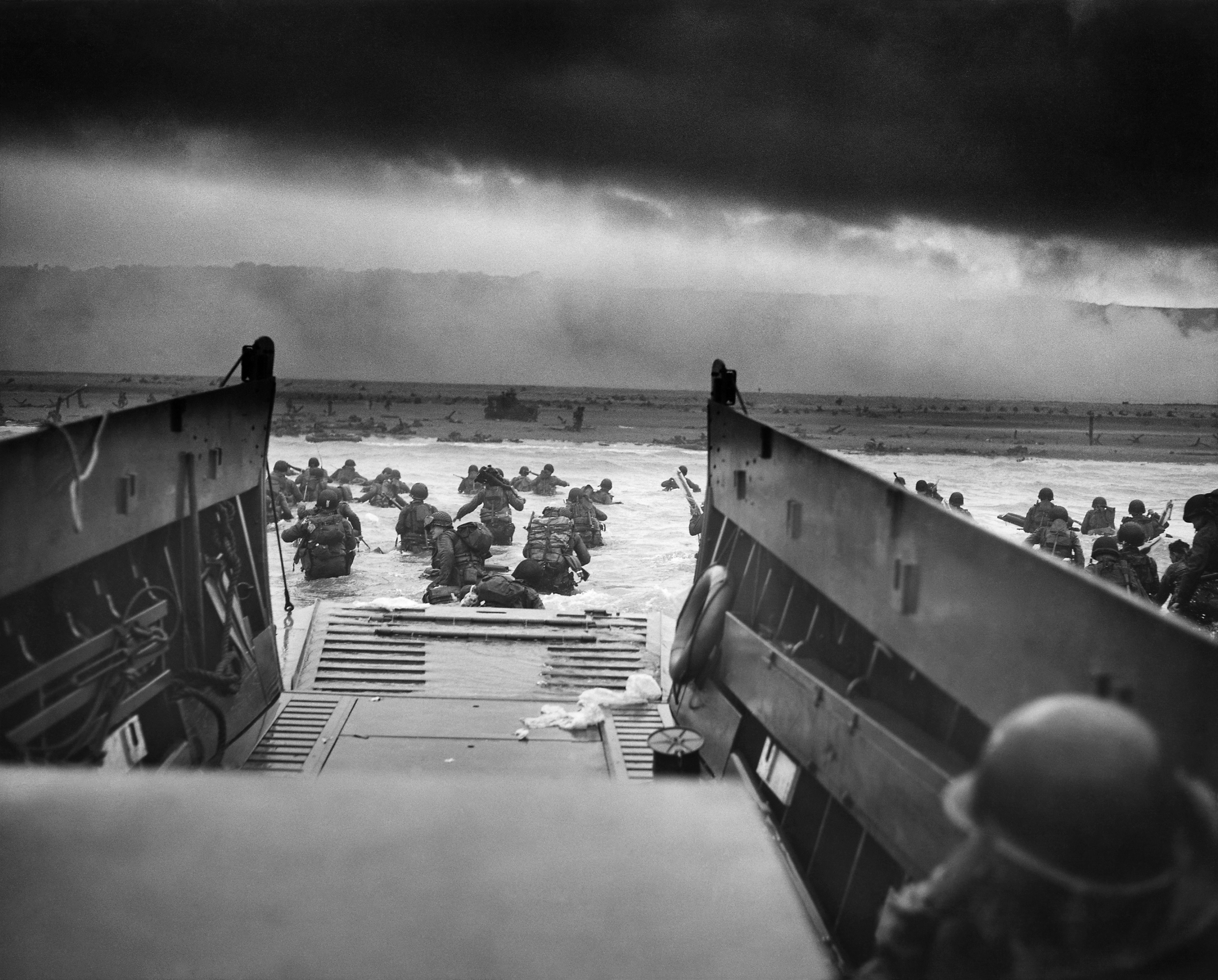
Into the Jaws of Death, 1944

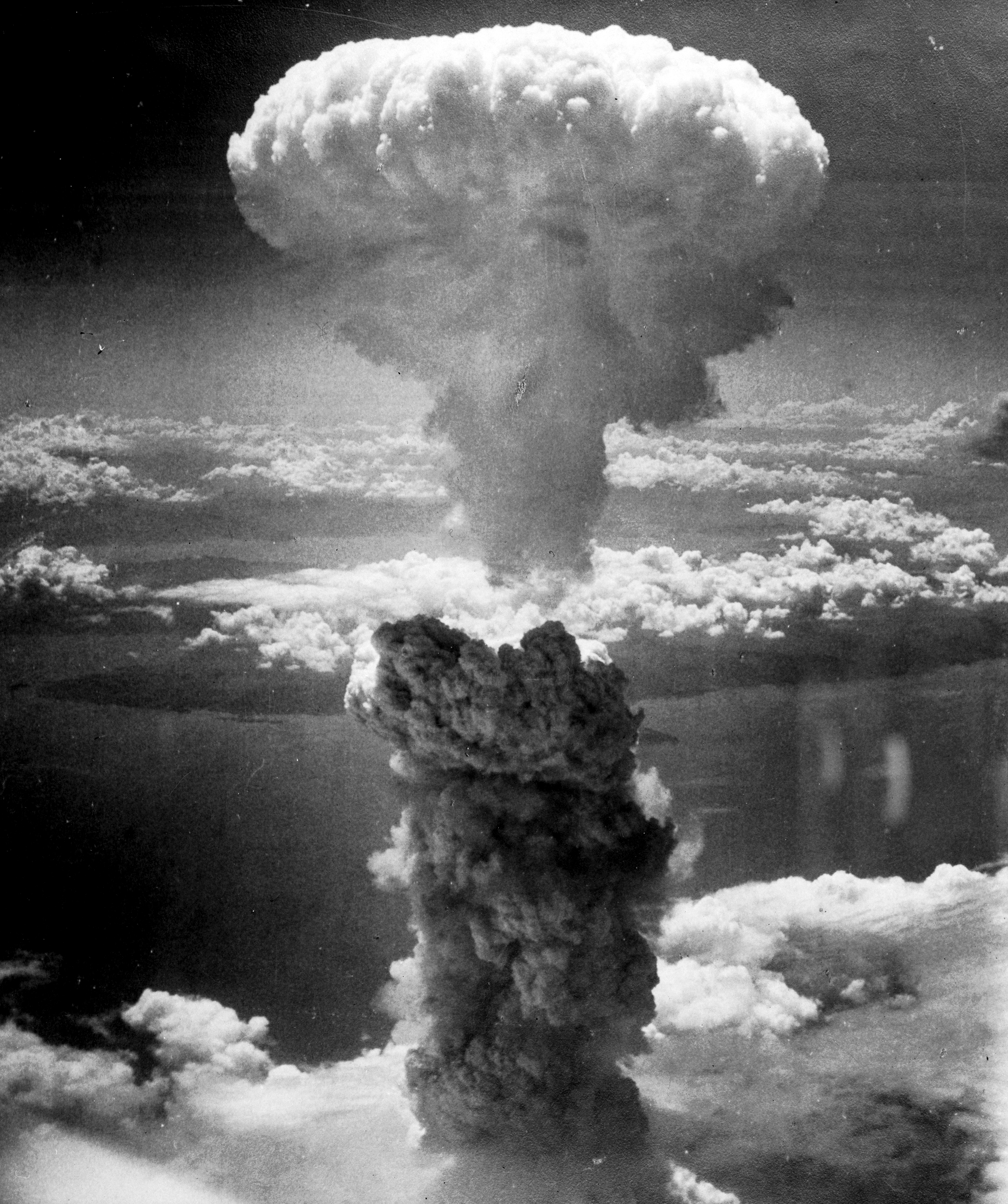
Atomic Cloud Rises Over Nagasaki, 1945

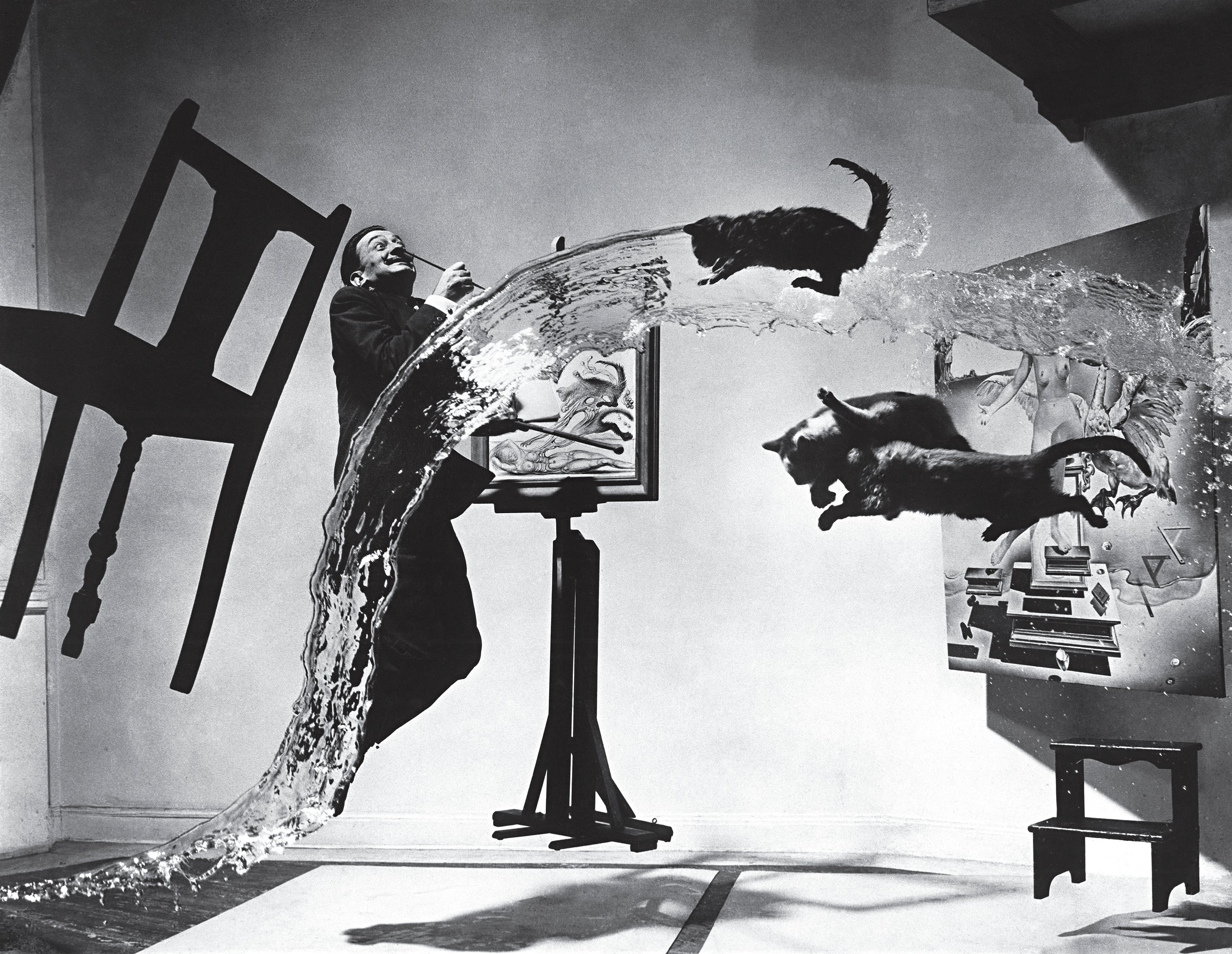
Dalí Atomicus, 1948

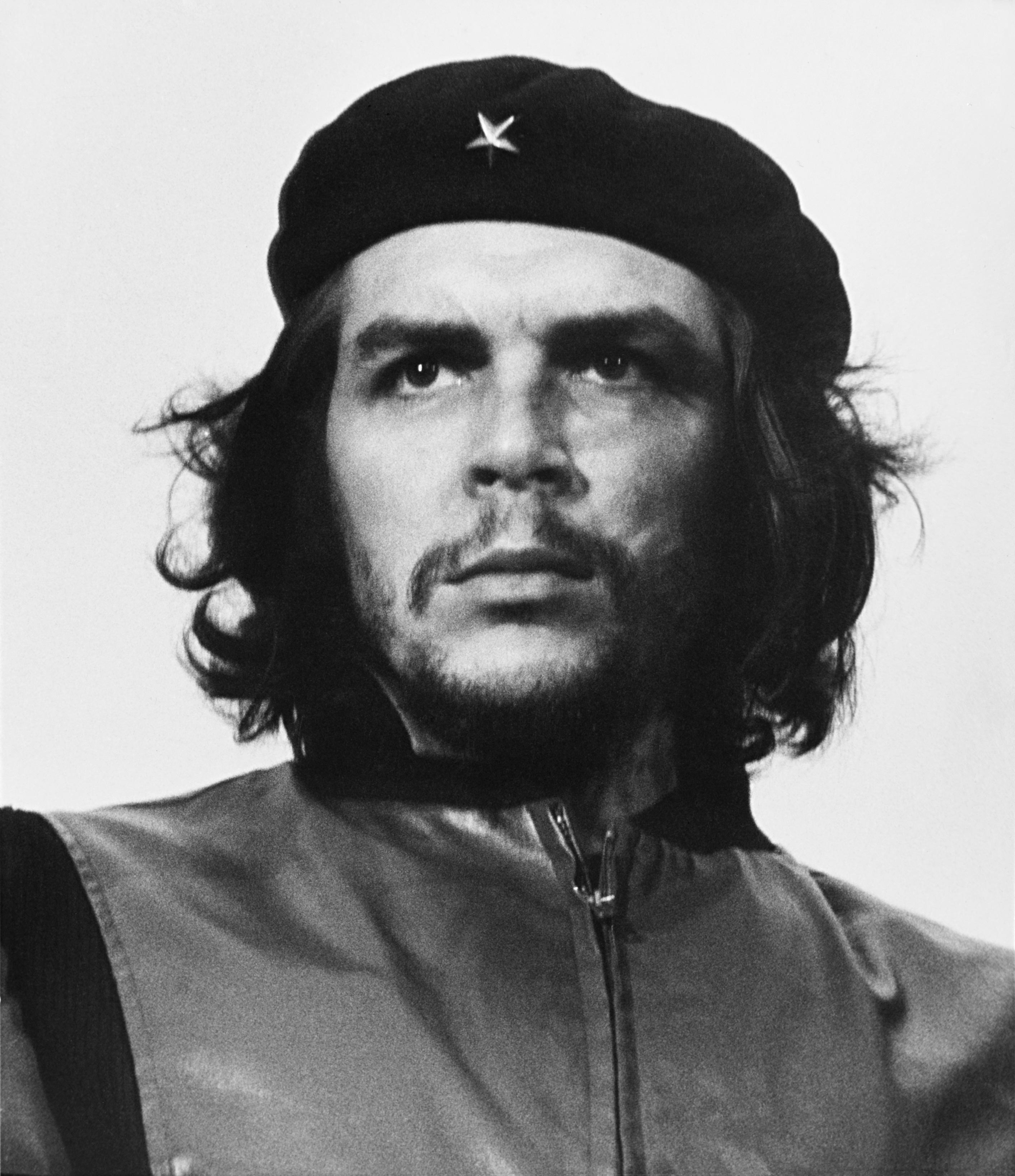
Che Guevara, 1960

East German border guard Konrad Schumann leaping over barbed wire to defect to West Germany, 1961

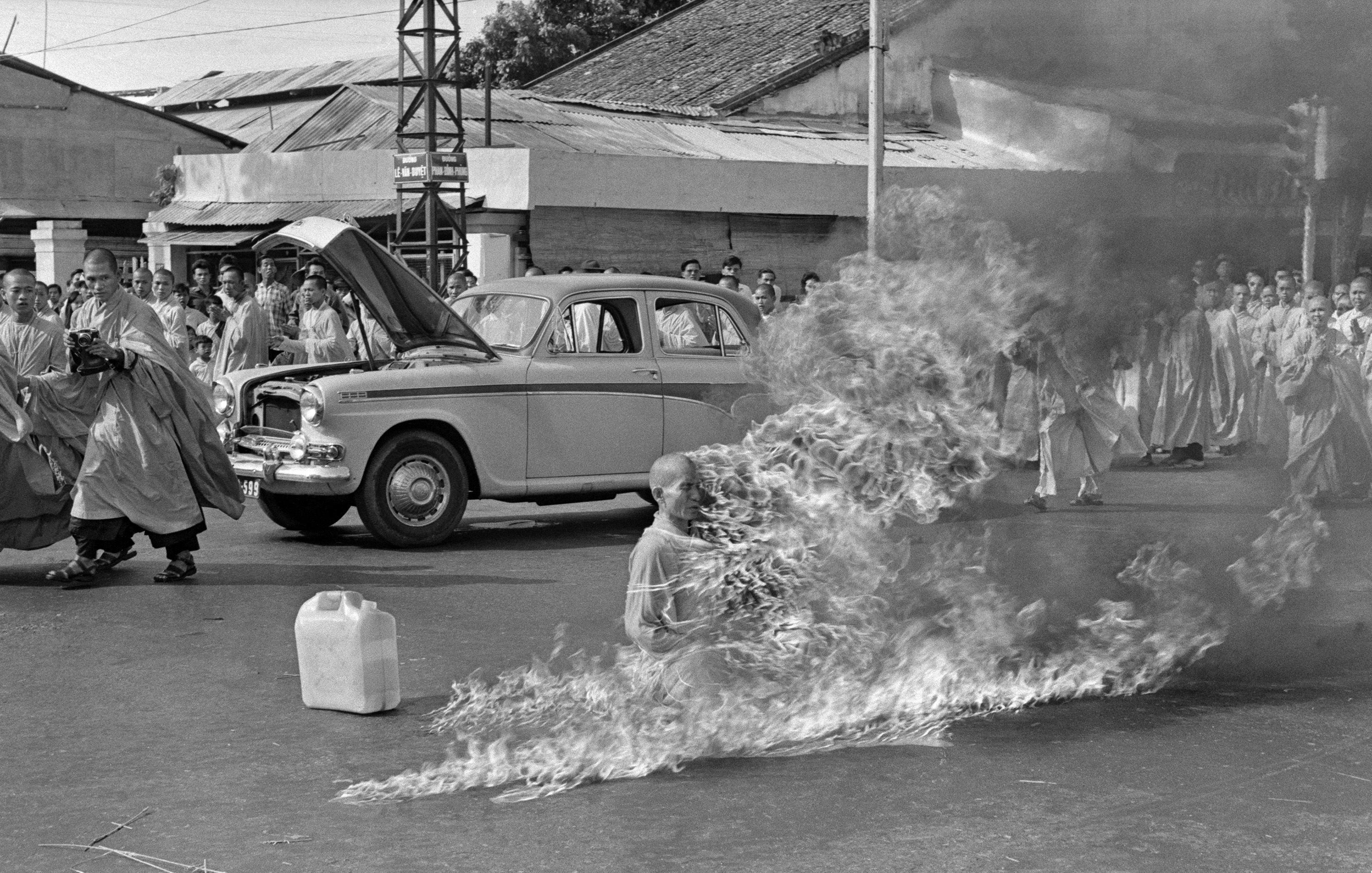
Thích Quảng Đức self-immolation, 1963

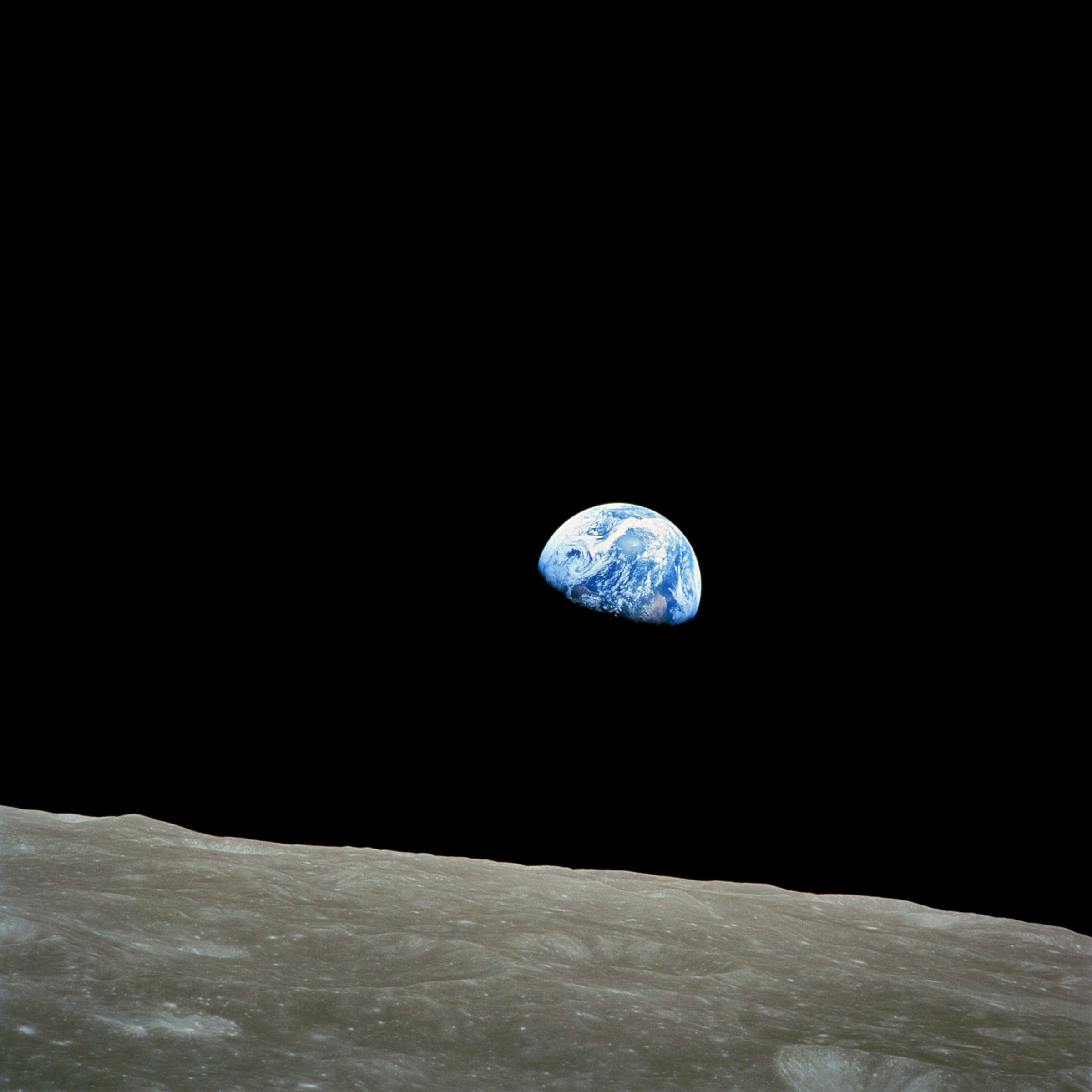
Earthrise, 1968, by William Anders

Buzz Aldrin's boot print on the Moon, 1969

Phan Thi Kim Phuc being burned by napalm, Vietnam, 1972.

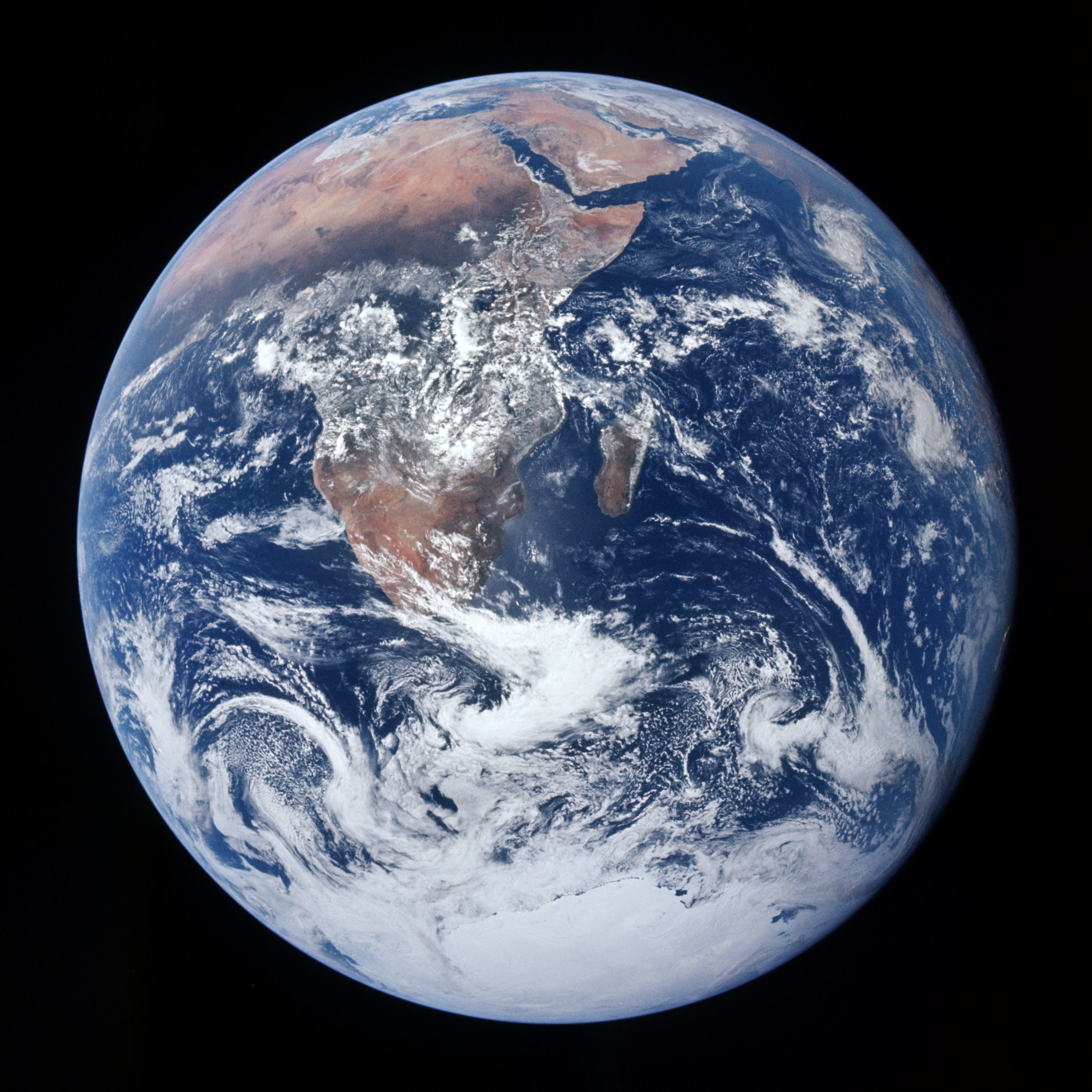
The Blue Marble, 1972

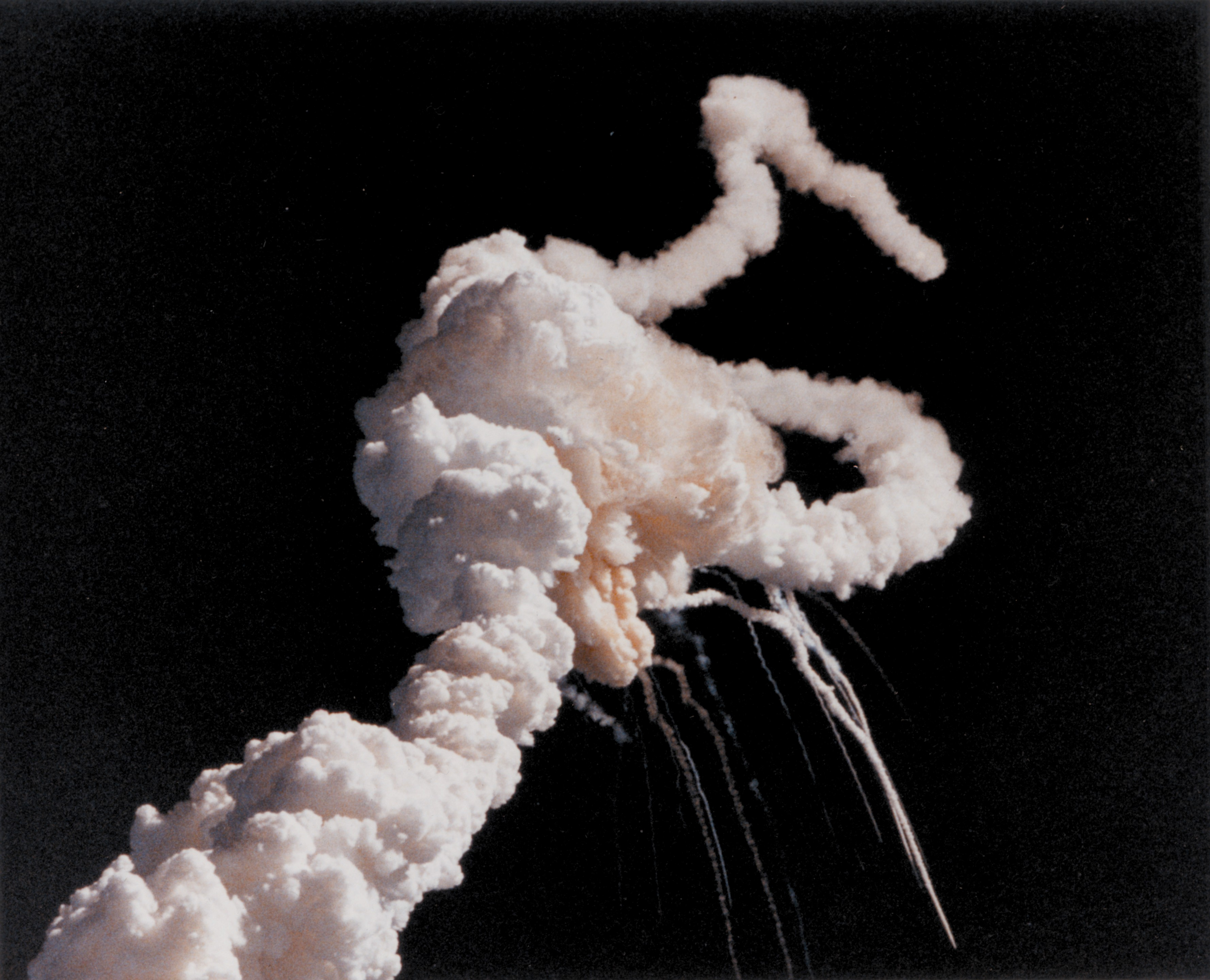
Space Shuttle Challenger explosion, 1986

== See also ==
- List of photographs considered the most important
