= Bloody Saturday (photograph) =

Photograph by H. S. Wong

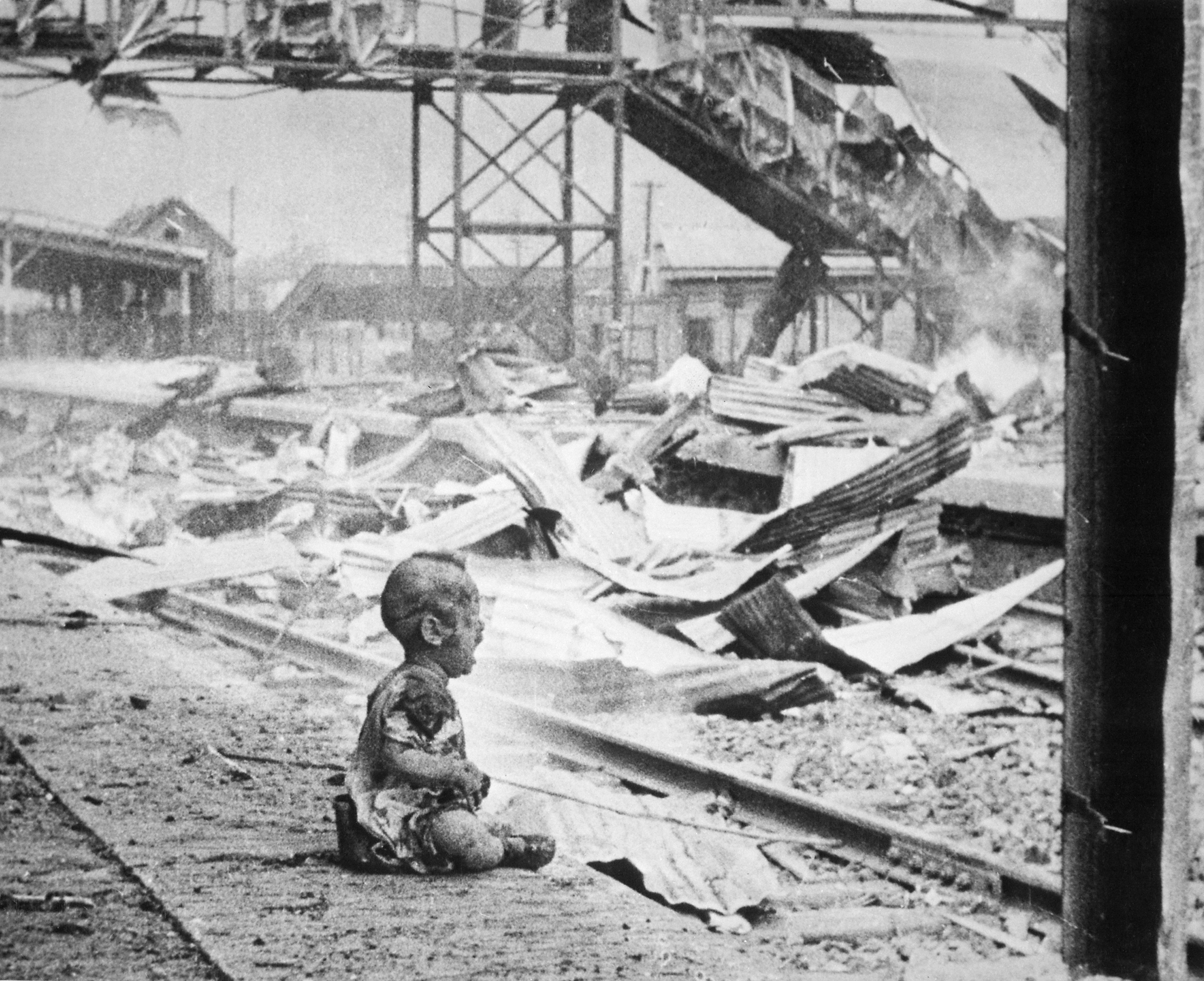
Bloody Saturday, by H. S. Wong

Bloody Saturday (Chinese: 血腥的星期六; pinyin: Xuèxīng de Xīngqíliù) is a black-and-white photograph taken on 28 August 1937, a few minutes after a Japanese air attack struck civilians during the Battle of Shanghai in the Second Sino-Japanese War. Depicting a Chinese baby crying within the bombed-out ruins of Shanghai South railway station, the photograph became known as a cultural icon demonstrating Japanese wartime atrocities in China. The photograph was widely published, and in less than a month had been seen by more than 136 million viewers. The photographer, Hearst Corporation's H. S. "Newsreel" Wong, also known as Wong Hai-Sheng or Wang Xiaoting, did not discover the identity or even the sex of the injured child, whose mother lay dead nearby. The baby was called Ping Mei. One of the most memorable war photographs ever published, and perhaps the most famous newsreel scene of the 1930s, the image stimulated an outpouring of Western anger against Japanese violence in China. Journalist Harold Isaacs called the iconic image "one of the most successful 'propaganda' pieces of all time".

Wong shot footage of the bombed-out South Station with his Eyemo newsreel camera, and he took several still photographs with his Leica. The famous still image, taken from the Leica, is not often referred to by name—rather, its visual elements are described. It has also been called Motherless Chinese Baby, Chinese Baby, and The Baby in the Shanghai Railroad Station. The photograph has been denounced by Japanese nationalists who claim that it was staged.

== Capturing the image ==
During the Battle of Shanghai, part of the Second Sino-Japanese War, Japanese military forces advanced upon and attacked Shanghai, China's most populous city. Wong and other newsreel men, such as Harrison Forman and George Krainukov, captured many images of the fighting, including the gruesome aftermath of an aerial bombing made by three Chinese aircraft against two prominent hotels on Nanking Road on Saturday, August 14, 1937, or "Bloody Saturday". Wong was a Chinese man who owned a camera shop in Shanghai. The National Revolutionary Army began to retreat from the city, leaving a blockade across the Huangpu River. An international group of journalists learned that aircraft from the Imperial Japanese Navy (IJN) were to bomb the blockade at 2:00 p.m. on Saturday, August 28, 1937, so many of these gathered atop the Butterfield & Swire building to take photographs of the bombing attack. At 3 pm, no aircraft were to be seen, and most of the newsmen dispersed, except H. S. "Newsreel" Wong, a cameraman working for Hearst Metrotone News, a newsreel producer. At 4 pm, 16 IJN aircraft appeared, circled, and bombed war refugees at Shanghai's South Station, killing and wounding civilians waiting for an overdue train bound for Hangzhou to the south.

Wong descended from the rooftop to the street, where he got into his car and drove quickly toward the ruined railway station. When he arrived, he noted carnage and confusion:

It was a horrible sight. People were still trying to get up. Dead and injured lay strewn across the tracks and platform. Limbs lay all over the place. Only my work helped me forget what I was seeing. I stopped to reload my camera. I noticed that my shoes were soaked with blood. I walked across the railway tracks, and made many long scenes with the burning overhead bridge in the background. Then I saw a man pick up a baby from the tracks and carry him to the platform. He went back to get another badly injured child. The mother lay dead on the tracks. As I filmed this tragedy, I heard the sound of planes returning. Quickly, I shot my remaining few feet [of film] on the baby. I ran toward the child, intending to carry him to safety, but the father returned. The bombers passed overhead. No bombs were dropped.

Wong never discovered the name of the burned and crying baby, whether it was a boy or a girl, or whether they survived. The next morning, he took the film from his Leica camera to the offices of China Press, where he showed enlargements to Malcolm Rosholt, saying, "Look at this one!" Wong later wrote that the next morning's newspapers reported that some 1,800 people, mostly women and children, had been waiting at the railway station, and that the IJN aviators had likely mistaken them for a troop movement. The Shanghai papers said that fewer than 300 people survived the attack. In October, Life magazine reported about 200 dead.

== Publication ==
Wong sent the newsreel footage on a U.S. Navy ship to Manila and from there, the film was flown to New York City aboard a Pan American World Airways airliner. Beginning in mid-September 1937, the newsreel was shown to movie theater audiences, estimated a month later to number 50 million people in the U.S. and 30 million outside of the U.S. and the still image of the crying baby was printed in Hearst Corporation newspapers and affiliates, some 25 million copies. A further 1.75 million non-Hearst newspaper copies showed the image in the U.S., and 4 million more people saw it as a matte reproduction in other newspapers. Some 25 million people saw it internationally. It first appeared in Life magazine on October 4, 1937, at which point it was estimated that 136 million people had seen it. On the facing page in Life magazine, another photograph showed the baby on a stretcher receiving medical care.

== Reaction ==
The "unforgettable" image became one of the most influential photos to stir up anti-Japanese sentiment in the United States. A "tidal wave of sympathy" poured out from America to China, and the image was widely reproduced to elicit donations for Chinese relief efforts. Catalyzed by the image, the U.S., the United Kingdom and France protested Japanese bombing of Chinese civilians in open cities. Senator George W. Norris was influenced by the image, being convinced to abandon his longtime stance of isolationism and non-interventionism—he railed against the Japanese as "disgraceful, ignoble, barbarous, and cruel, even beyond the power of language to describe." Americans used terms such as "butchers" and "murderers" against the Japanese. Subsequent to Shanghai's surrender, IJN Admiral Kōichi Shiozawa said to a reporter from The New York Times at a cocktail party: "I see your American newspapers have nicknamed me the Babykiller."

The image was voted by Life readers as one of ten "Pictures of the Year" for 1937. In 1944, Wong's newsreel sequence was used within the Frank Capra film The Battle of China, part of the Why We Fight series.

== Legacy ==
While in art school in the late 1940s, Andy Warhol painted a version of the photograph, the earliest of his many paintings based on photographs; the original artwork has not been located and may be lost. Warhol's Disaster Series in the 1960s was a return to that format, to interpretations of the highly visible works produced by photojournalists. In 1977, Lowell Thomas, journalist and narrator for Hearst rival Movietone News, set the photo's influence in America as high as two of the most iconic World War II images: a French man grimacing in tears as his country's soldiers abandon France in June 1940, and Joe Rosenthal's Raising the Flag on Iwo Jima, shot in February 1945.

Wong retired to Taipei in the 1970s and died of diabetes at his home at the age of 81 on March 9, 1981. In 2010, Wong was honored as a pioneering Asian-American journalist by the Asian American Journalists Association.

In 2000, artist and journalist Miao Xiaochun projected the famous image against a white curtain, using the faintness of the projection to signify the diminution of its impact over time. The photograph appeared in the Time–Life book 100 Photographs that Changed the World, published in 2003. National Geographic included the photograph in their Concise History of the World: An Illustrated Timeline in 2006. The "searing image" was said by National Geographic author Michael S. Sweeney to have served as the "harbinger of Eastern militarism".

=== Allegations of falsehood ===
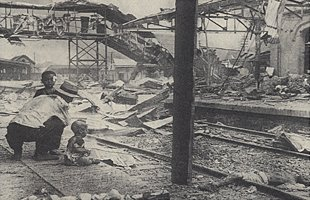
Another of Wong's Shanghai baby photographs was published by Look magazine in December 1937.

At the time, Japanese media denied the authenticity of the photo, and the Japanese government put a bounty of $50,000 on Wong's head: an amount equivalent to $1,120,000 in 2025. Wong was known to be outspokenly critical of Japanese foreign policy and to have leftist political sympathies, and he worked for William Randolph Hearst who was famous for saying to his newsmen, "You furnish the pictures and I'll furnish the war" in relation to the Spanish–American War. Another of Wong's photos appeared in Look magazine on December 21, 1937, showing a man bent over a child of perhaps five years of age, both near the crying baby. The man was alleged to be Wong's assistant Taguchi who was arranging the children for best photographic effect. An article in The Japan Times and Mail said the man was a rescue worker who was posing the baby and the boy for the photographer. Wong described the man as the baby's father, coming to rescue his children as the Japanese aircraft returned following the bombing. Japanese propagandists drew a connection between what they claimed was a falsified image and the general news accounts by U.S. and Chinese sources reporting on the fighting in Shanghai, with the aim of discrediting all reports of Japanese atrocities.

In 1956, Look magazine's Arthur Rothstein supported his earlier opinion that Wong borrowed the baby and staged the photograph. In 1975, Life magazine featured the famous photo in a picture book, and wrote in the caption, "It has been said that this is staged, but it is evident from various points that this is no more than a fabricated rumor."

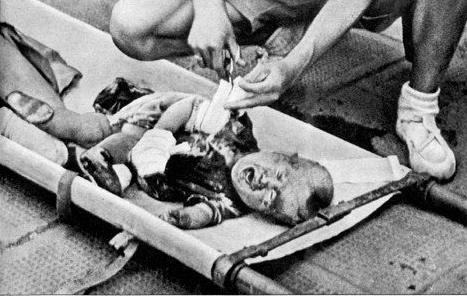
The baby on a stretcher, receiving first aid

In 1999, the Association for Advancement of Unbiased View of History, a nationalist and denialist group founded by Fujioka Nobukatsu, a former professor at Tokyo University, published an article entitled "Manipulation of Documentary Photos in China: Fanning Flames of Hate in the USA" in which Fujioka and Shūdō Higashinakano argue that the photograph shows a man setting first one then two children on the railroad tracks for the purpose of making a "pitiable sight" for American viewers, to ready American citizens for war against Japan. Nobukatsu argues that Wong added smoke to make the image more dramatic, but Rosholt wrote that the train station was still smoking when Wong arrived. Aforementioned Japanese revisionists do not deny the bombing, nor that Chinese civilians were killed and wounded, but claim the presentation of the photograph as a fake allows for the easy interpretation that there are further falsehoods in the historical record. In the article, Nobukatsu and Higashinakano do not mention the additional Wong photo published in Life magazine which shows the baby crying on a medical stretcher as it is given first aid by a Chinese Boy Scout.

Wong filmed more newsreels covering Japanese attacks in China, including the Battle of Xuzhou in May 1938 and aerial bombings in Guangzhou in June. He operated under British protection, but continued death threats from Japanese nationalists drove him to leave Shanghai with his family and to relocate to Hong Kong.

== See also ==
- List of photographs considered the most important
