= H. S. Wong =

Chinese photojournalist

H. S. "Newsreel" Wong

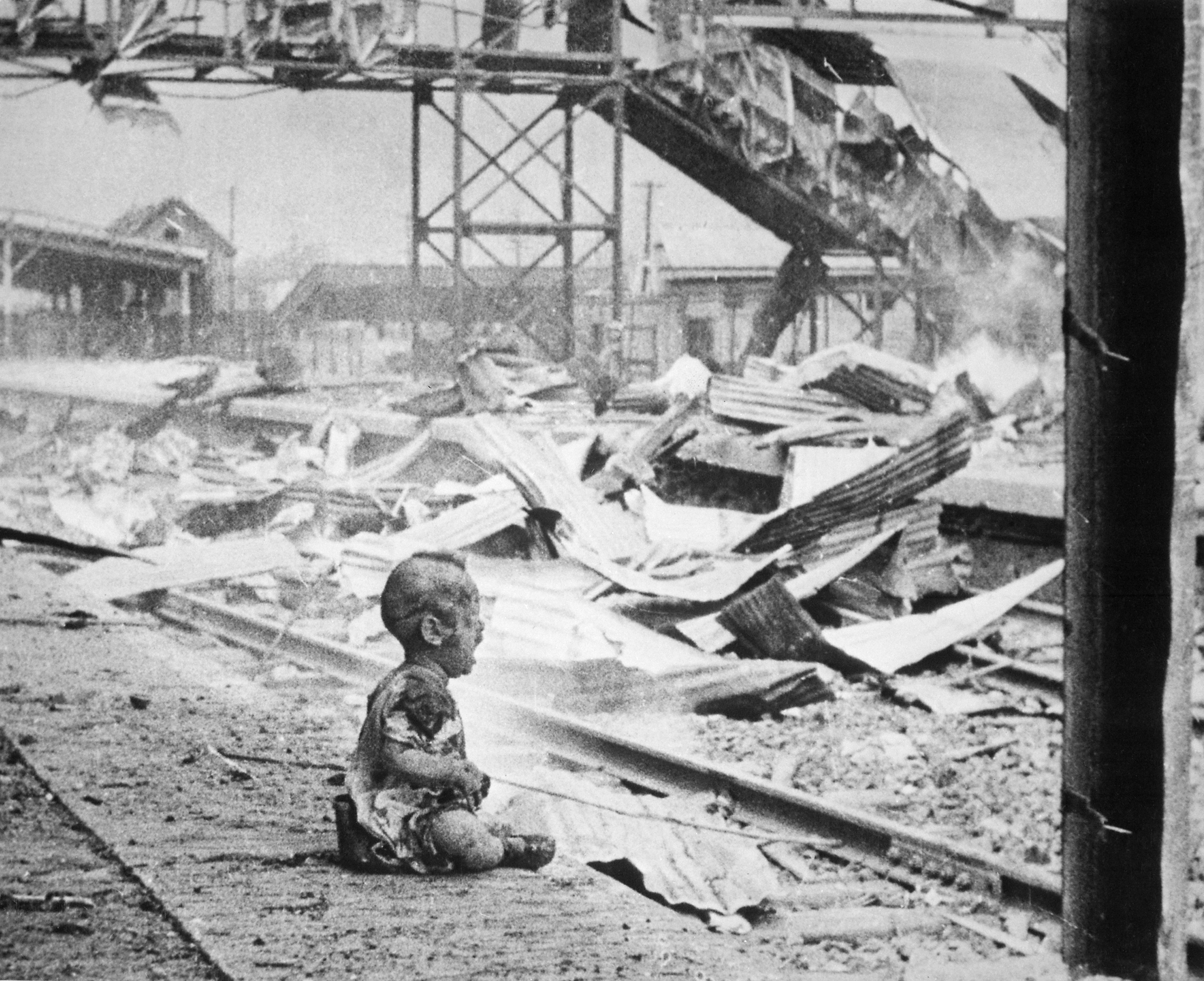
"Bloody Saturday", Wong's most famous photograph

H. S. "Newsreel" Wong (1900 – March 9, 1981) was a Chinese newsreel photojournalist. He is most notable for Bloody Saturday, a photograph of a crying baby in Shanghai that he took during the Second Sino-Japanese War.

Wong was also known as Wang Haisheng (Chinese: 王海升) or Wang Xiaoting (Chinese: 王小亭). He owned a camera shop in Shanghai. For capturing moving images he used an Eyemo newsreel camera, and for still photography he used a Leica.

== Career ==
In the 1920s and 1930s, H. S. Wong worked in China and provided photographs and films for various newspapers and agencies, such as Hearst Metrotone News and Shanghai News. Wong's most famous photo, "Bloody Saturday" or "Shanghai Baby", was taken during the Battle of Shanghai in the Second Sino-Japanese War. It shows a baby sitting up and crying amid the bombed-out wreckage of Shanghai South Railway Station. Within a year of its publishing, the photo was seen by more than 136 million people. In 2010, Wong was honored as a pioneering Asian-American journalist by the Asian American Journalists Association.

Wong filmed more newsreels covering Japanese attacks in China, including the Battle of Xuzhou in May 1938 and aerial bombings in Guangzhou in June. At times, he placed himself in danger to get a photo; once was subjected to bombing and strafing by Japanese aircraft. After angering the Japanese by documenting the violence of their attacks, the Japanese government put a bounty of $50,000 on his head. In China, he operated under British protection, but continued death threats from Japanese nationalists drove him to leave Shanghai with his family and to relocate to Hong Kong.

== Later life and death ==
Wong retired to Taipei in the 1970s and died of diabetes at his home at the age of 81 on March 9, 1981.
