= Treu =

Treu is a surname. Notable people with the surname include:

- Abdias Treu (1597–1669), German mathematician and academic
- Adam Treu (born 1974), American football player
- Blair Treu (born 1957), American film director
- Catharina Treu (1743–1811), German painter
- Georg Treu (1843-1921), German classical archaeologist and curator
- Kurt Treu (1928–1991), German classical philologist
- Paul Treu (born 1971), South African rugby union player and coach
- Philipp Treu (born 2000), German association football player
- Tiziano Treu (born 1939), Italian politician and academic
- Wolfgang Treu (politician) (died 1540), Austrian politician
- Wolfgang Treu (cinematographer) (1930-2018), German cinematographer

== See also ==
- Trieu, Vietnamese surname
