= Richard Caton Woodville =

American painter (1825–1855)

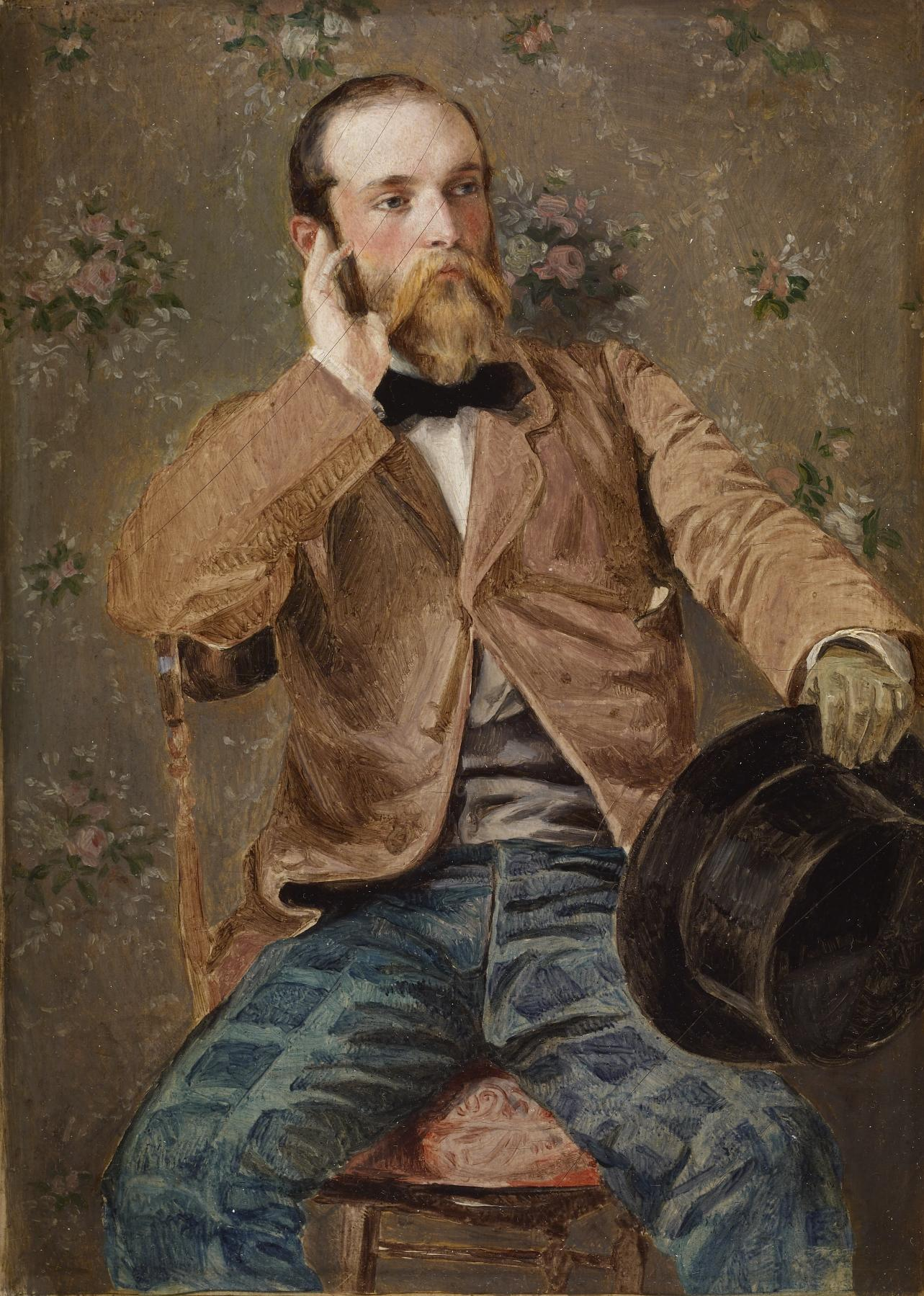
- Self-portrait, 1853
- Born: 30 April 1825; Baltimore, Maryland, U.S.
- Died: 13 August 1855 (aged 30); London, England
- Education: Düsseldorf Academy
- Known for: Genre painting
- Patrons: American Art-Union

Richard Caton Woodville (30 April 1825 – 13 August 1855) was an American artist from Baltimore who spent his professional career in Europe, after studying in Düsseldorf under the direction of Karl Ferdinand Sohn. He died of an overdose of morphine in London at the age of 30. He was the father of Richard Caton Woodville Jr., also a noted artist. In his short career he produced fewer than 20 paintings; but they were well known in their time through exhibition and prints and have remained prominent in the canon of American painters.

== Early life and training ==
Woodville was the eldest son born to a prominent Baltimore family. He displayed early promise in caricatures of his teachers. He attended the University of Maryland Medical School for one year. Woodville would likely have been exposed to the expansive private collection of Baltimore art collector Robert Gilmor Jr.

In 1845 Woodville exhibited and sold his first painting, Two Figures at a Stove, in the annual exhibition at the National Academy of Design in New York. At the age of 20, he left Baltimore with his new wife, Mary Theresa Buckler, for the Kunstakademie Düsseldorf, Germany, where he was formally enrolled for one year. He remained in Düsseldorf for the next six years (1845–1851) studying with instructor and portrait painter Karl Ferdinand Sohn. The Düsseldorf Academy was a popular place of training for American artists in the mid-19th century, known as the Düsseldorf school of painting. Well-known American painters who spent time in Düsseldorf at the same time as Woodville include, Emanuel Leutze, Worthington Whittredge, John Whetton Ehninger, and Eastman Johnson. Under Sohn's guidance, Woodville developed a technique that was praised for its attention to detail and color. From Düsseldorf, Woodville sent paintings back to the United States to be exhibited primarily at the American Art-Union.

== Major works ==
Best known for detailed depictions of contemporary interior scenes, Woodville chose subject matter that was often ambiguous. In 1846, he sent The Card Players back to the United States to be exhibited. The Card Players was a great success for the artist. Politics in an Oyster House was commissioned in 1848 by Baltimore patron John H. B. Latrobe. Like other Woodville paintings, it was reproduced as a popular print. Widely acclaimed by American critics, this painting deals with the "low life" environment of oyster cellars and marginal characters that frequented them. Woodville's great attention to detail is very apparent in this painting. In one of his most popular paintings, Old ’76 and Young ’48 (1849), Woodville provides a glimpse into a tension-filled scene of generational differences between the old Revolutionary war veteran and the young wounded soldier home from the Mexican War. The interesting aspect of this painting is how Woodville continues to show the differences in these two generations through the objects located throughout this interior scene.

== Patronage ==
Woodville's success as an artist had a lot to do with his relationship with the American Art-Union. This subscription-based organization, which published the monthly Bulletin of the American Art-Union, held popular exhibitions in New York each year. The journal frequently praised Woodville's paintings, and his work was purchased and distributed to Art-Union patrons.

== Later years ==
Woodville left Düsseldorf in 1851 to spend time in Paris and London. The American Art-Union came under scrutiny for their lottery fundraising system and was eventually shut down and Woodville lost his American outlet.

In 1855, Woodville died of a morphine overdose in London. He left behind his second wife, Antoinette Marie Schnitzler and their two children, including artist Richard Caton Woodville Jr. who became a famous British battle scene painter. Woodville also fathered two children in his first marriage. Woodville left sixteen finished paintings, but no personal letters or journals.

The Baltimore based Walters Art Museum holds a number of Woodville paintings in its permanent collection, including Politics in an Oyster House, Old '76 and Young '48 and The Sailor's Wedding. A Woodville retrospective exhibition, New Eyes on America: The Genius of Richard Caton Woodville, showcasing the entirety of the artist's career, was organized and exhibited by the Walters March 10, 2013–June 2, 2013.

== Selected works by the artist ==
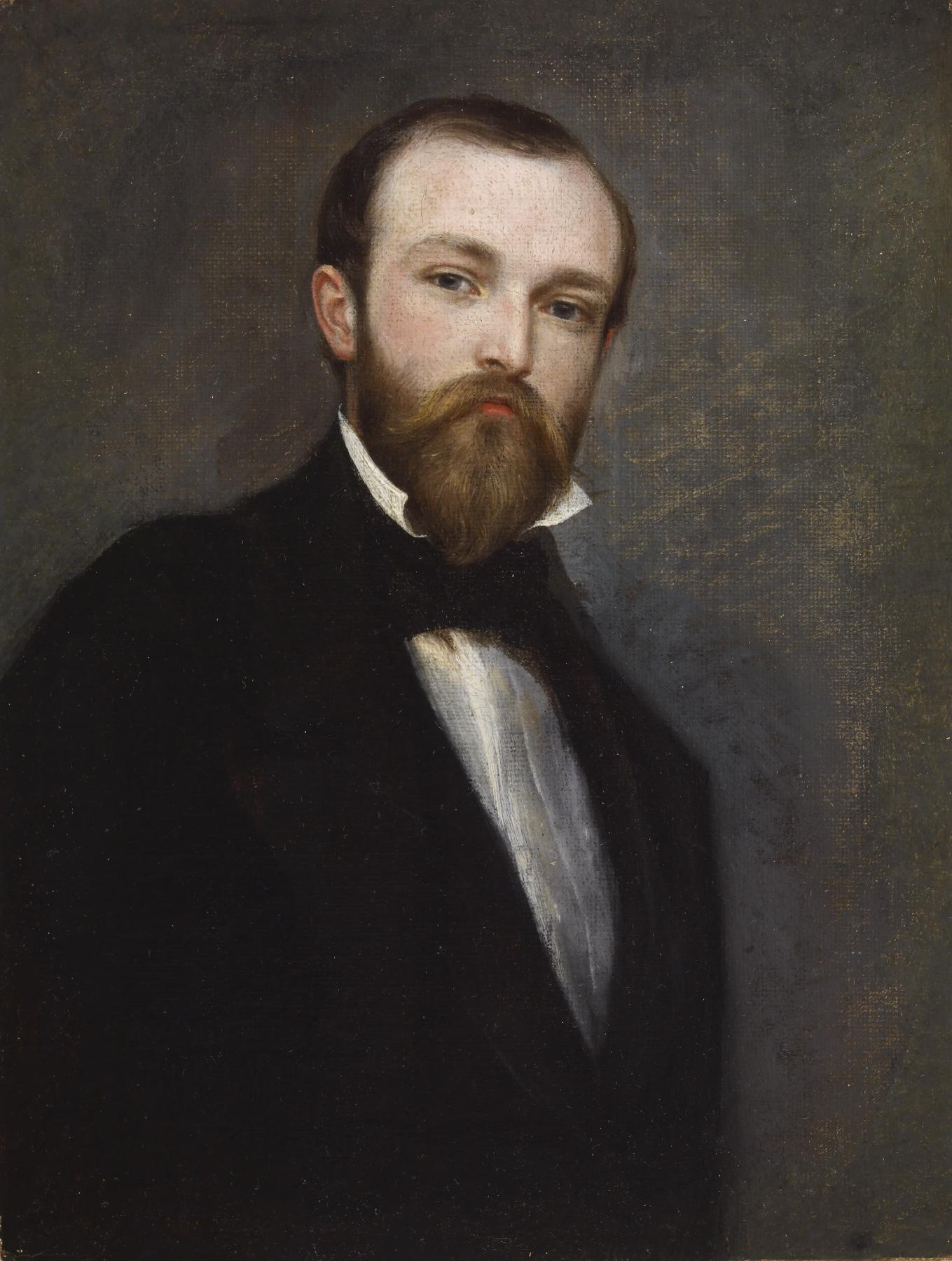
Self-Portrait (19th Century), Collection of Walters Art Museum.

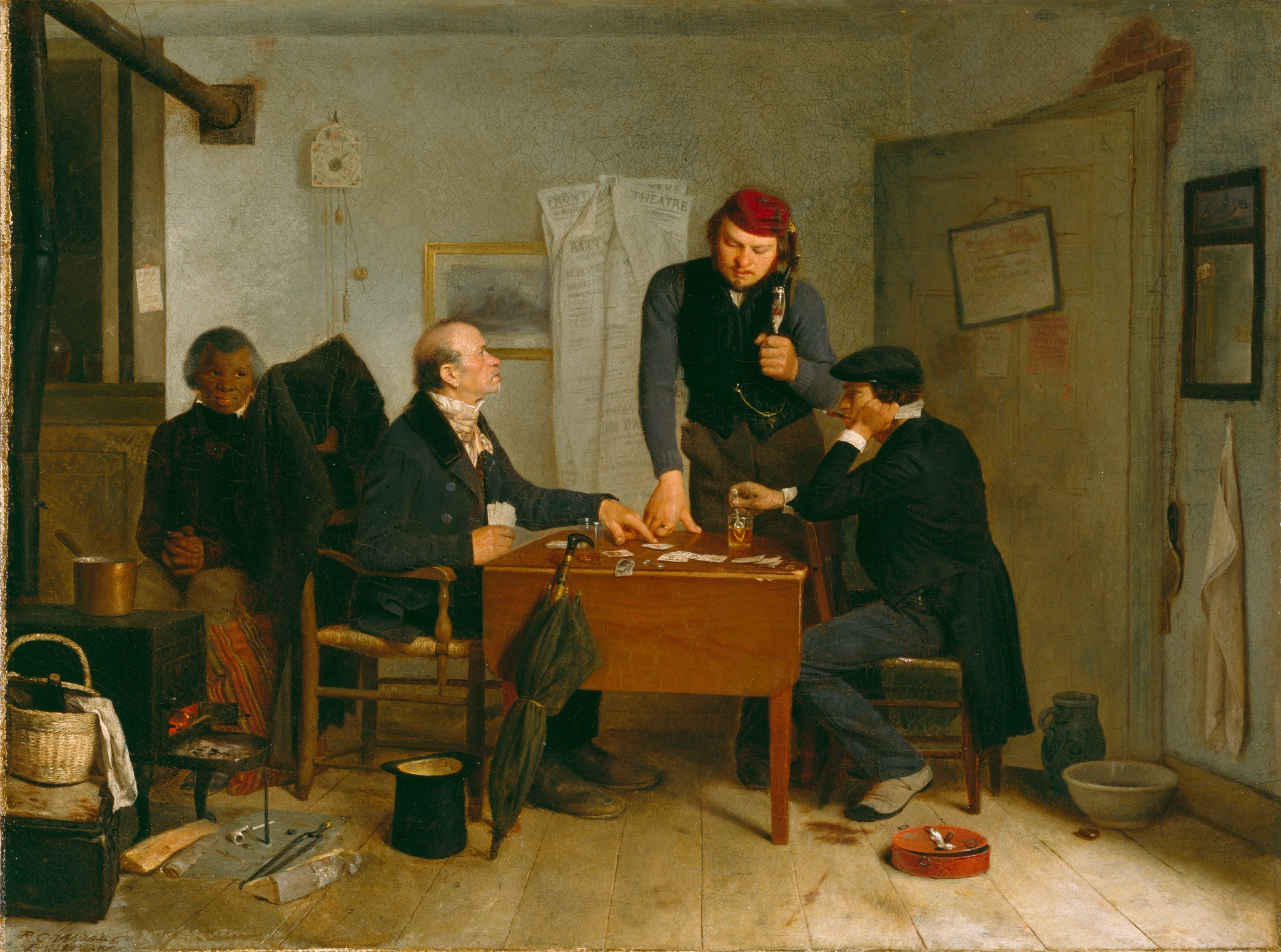
The Card Players (1846), Collection of Detroit Institute of Arts

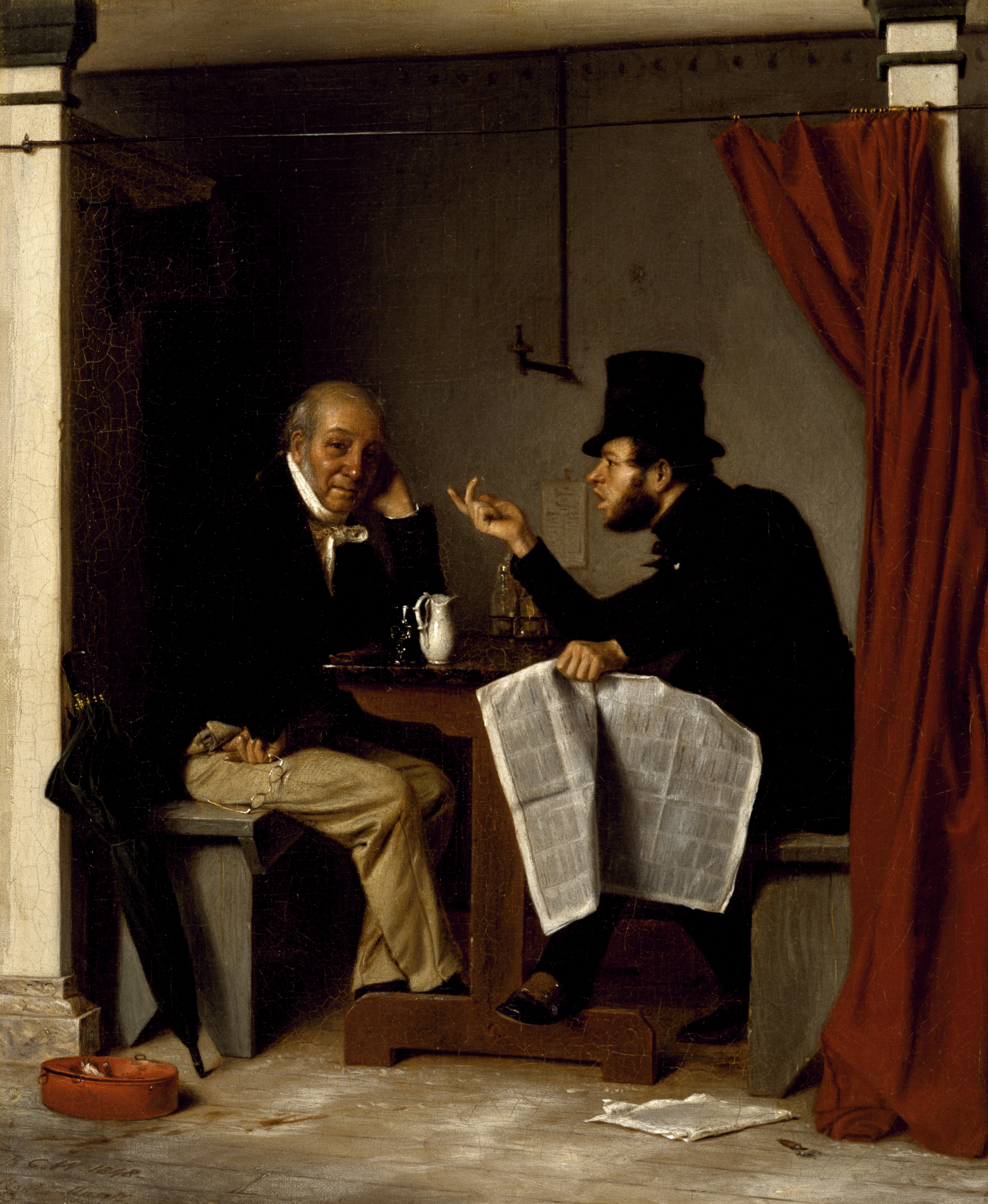
Politics in an Oyster House (1848), Collection of Walters Art Museum.

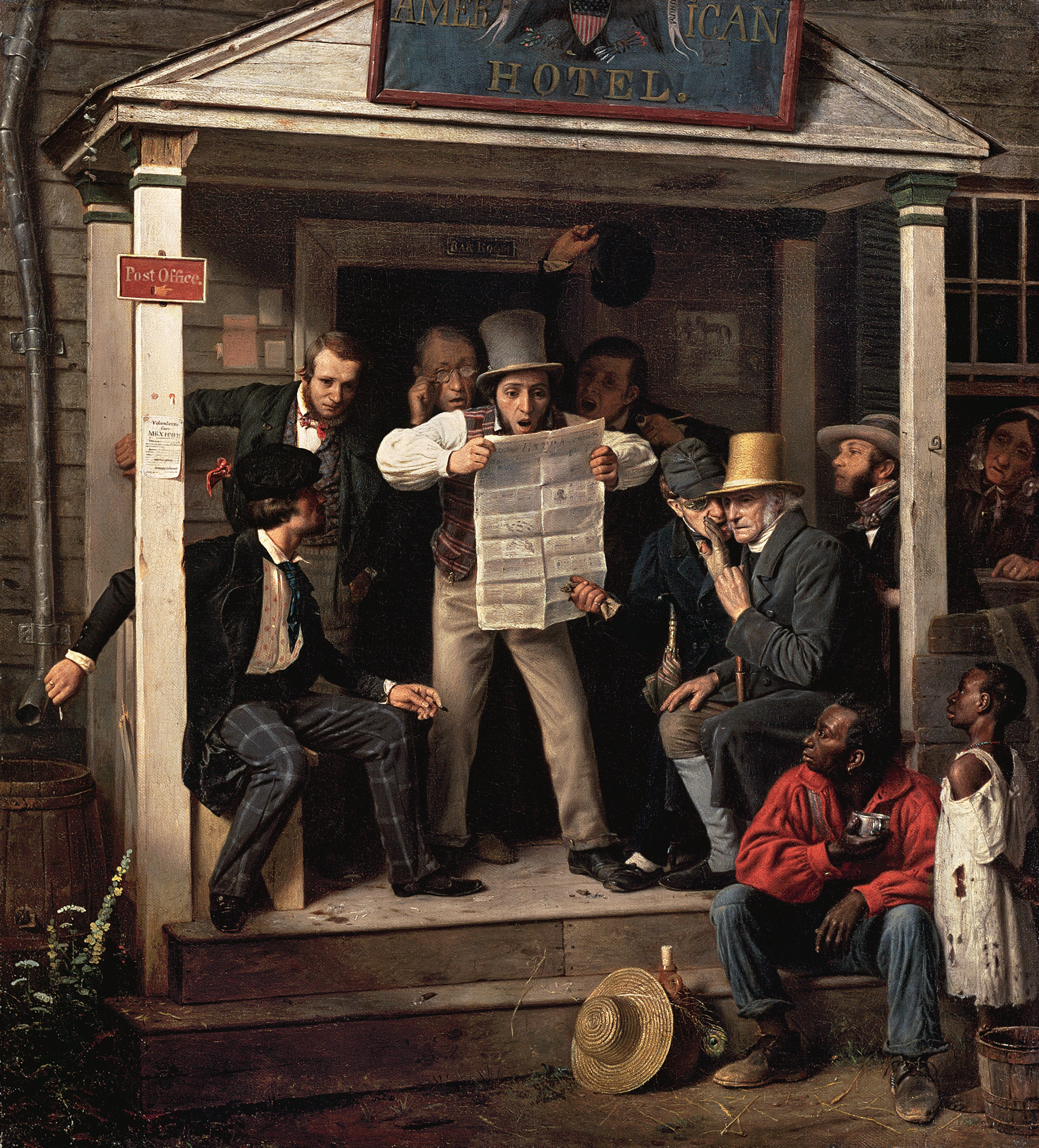
War News from Mexico (1848), Collection of Crystal Bridges Museum of American Art.

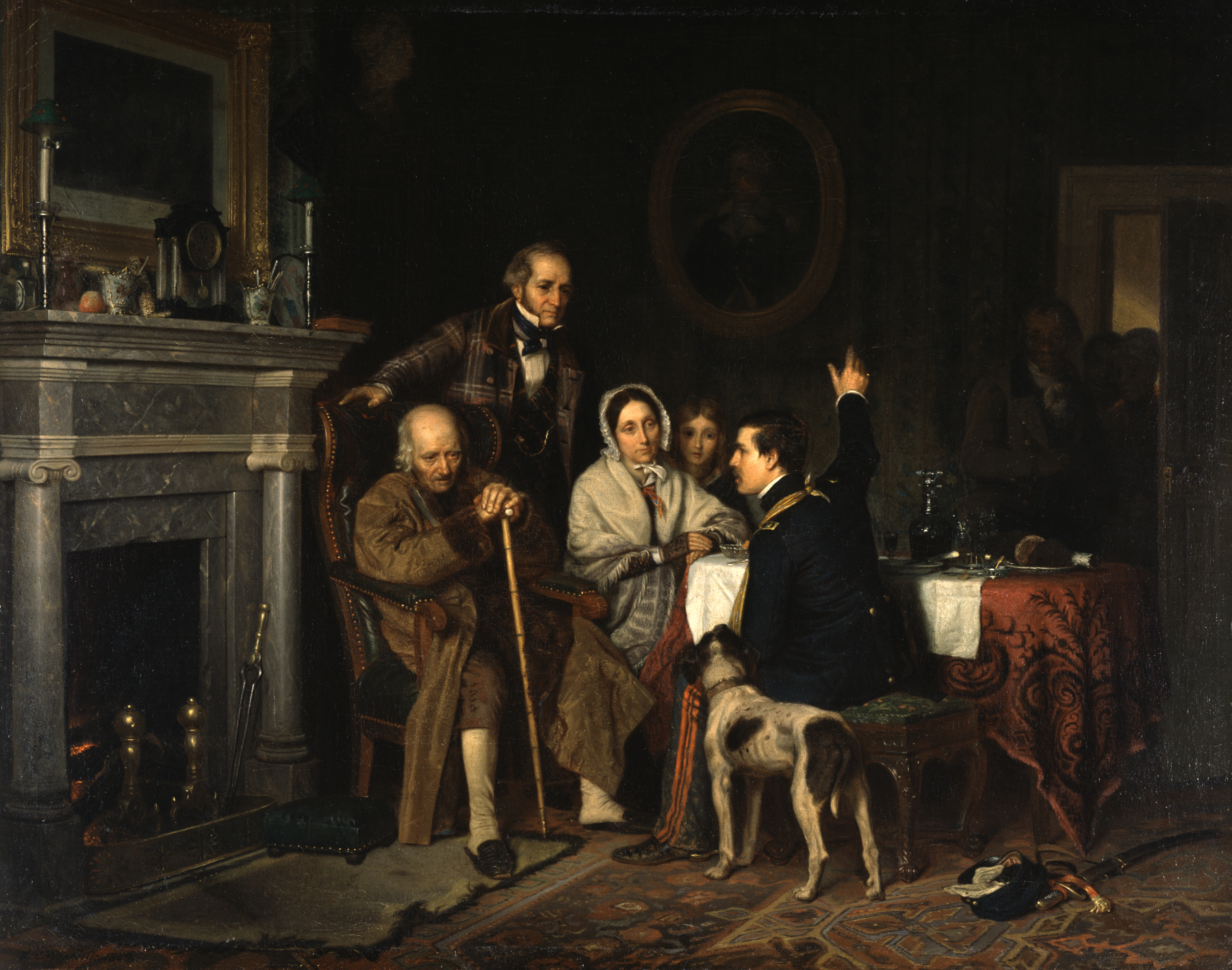
Old '76 and Young '48 (1849), Collection of Walters Art Museum.

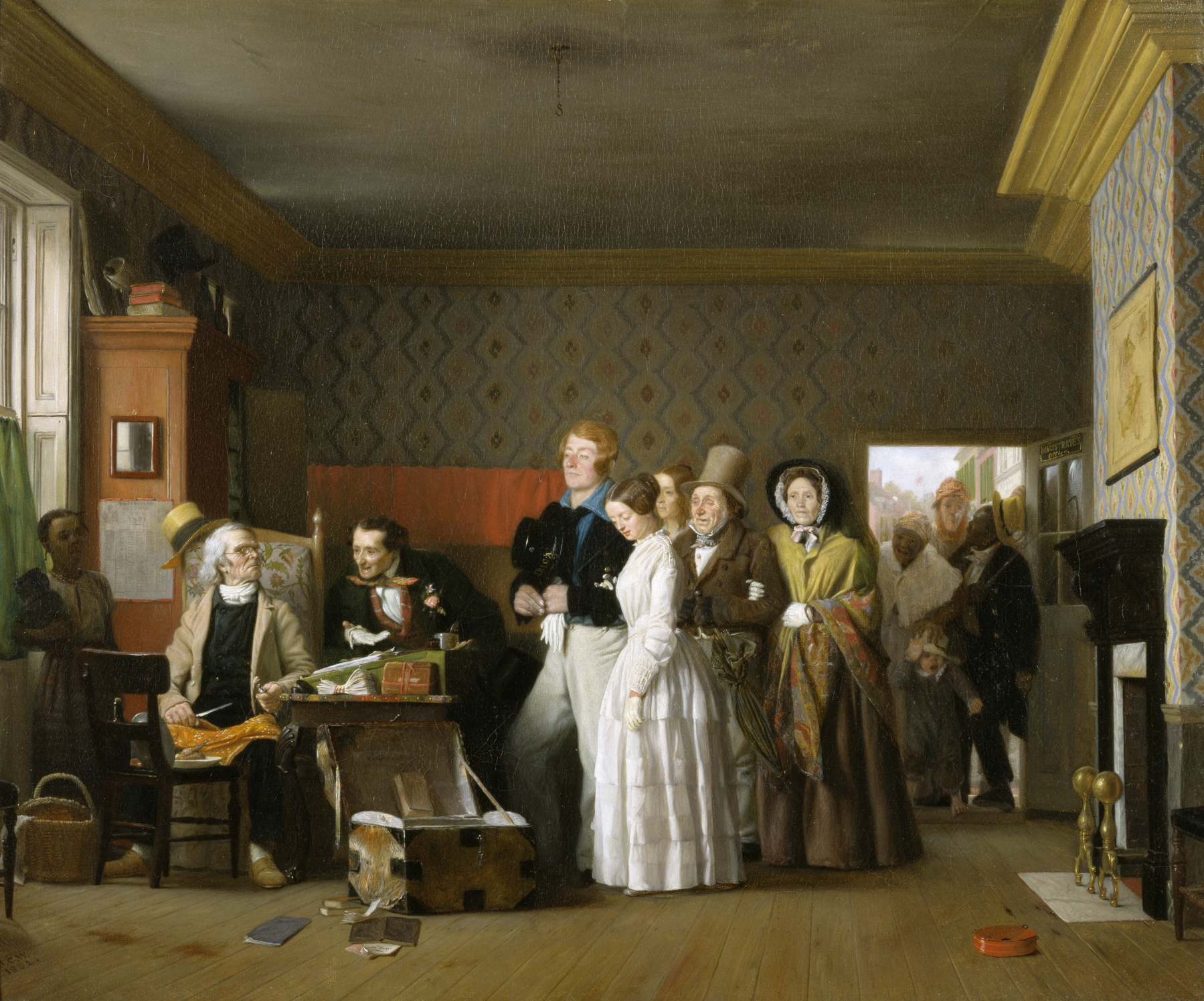
The Sailor's Wedding (1852), Collection of Walters Art Museum.

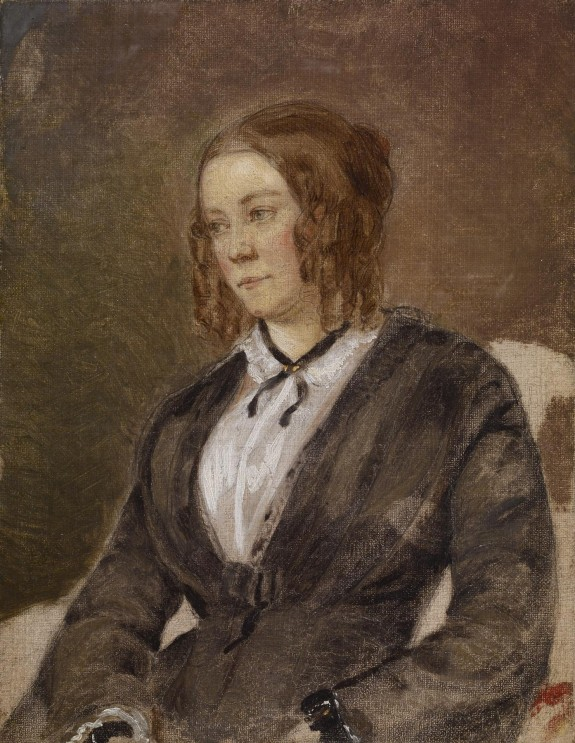
Portrait of a Woman (c. 1853), Collection of Walters Art Museum.
