= Moritz Kellerhoven =

German painter

- Self portrait, c. 1795, Gemäldegalerie, Berlin
- Born: 1758; Troisdorf, Duchy of Berg
- Died: 15 December 1830 (aged 71–72); Munich, Kingdom of Bavaria
- Education: Lambert Krahe
- Known for: Painting; Etching
- Movement: Neoclassicism

Moritz Kellerhoven (1758 – 15 December 1830) was a German portrait painter and etcher.

== Life ==
Kellerhoven was born in the Altenrath district of Troisdorf, to Wilhelm Kellerhoven, an innkeeper, and his wife Juliane. He was still very young when his father died, so he was placed in the care of his maternal uncle (a clergyman) who lived in Düsseldorf. He was originally educated with the intent of his joining the clergy too, but he showed an aptitude for art instead and, at the age of seventeen was sent to the Kunstakademie Düsseldorf, where he studied with Lambert Krahe.

Further studies took him to Antwerp, London and Paris. In 1779, he went to Vienna and, in 1782, to Italy. By 1784, he was well-known and received an appointment as Court Painter to Elector Karl Theodor in Munich. Upon the recommendation of Johann Peter von Langer (an acquaintance from Düsseldorf) he became one of the first professors at the Academy of Fine Arts Munich after its reorganization in 1808. He remained there as a teacher and manager until his death and earned a reputation as one of Germany's greatest portrait painters. He eventually portrayed almost every member of the Bavarian nobility and clergy. His most familiar portrait is that of Maximilian I in his coronation robes, which has been used as an illustration in many historical texts.

Kellerhoven was married, with several daughters and a son, Joseph, who also became a well-known portrait painter. In his last years he suffered from arthritis and gout, which eventually, in the spring of 1830, afflicted his throat and led to his death. He died in Munich and is buried in the Alter Südfriedhof.

== Gallery ==
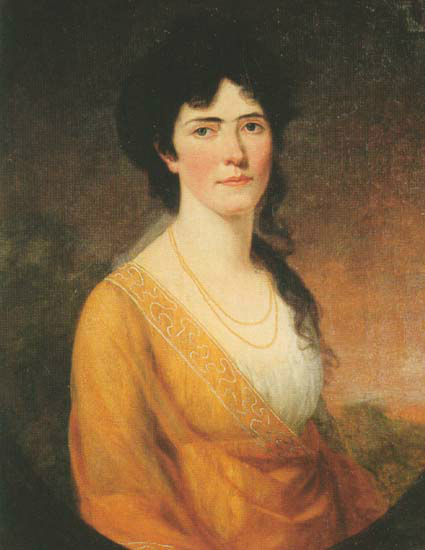
Caroline of Baden, (1776–1841)

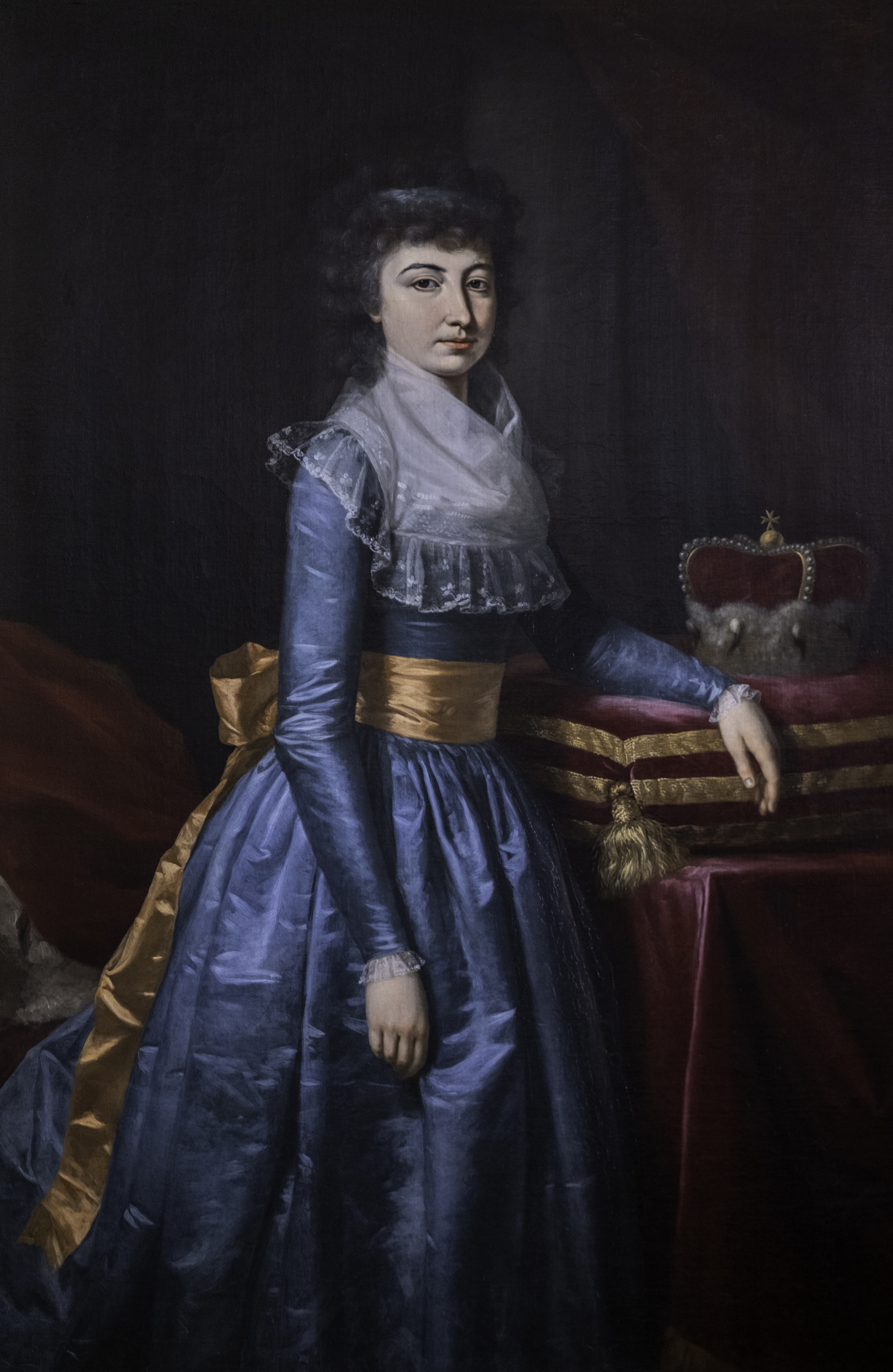
Archduchess Maria Leopoldine of Austria-Este, (1776–1848)

Countess Palatine Maria Anna of Zweibrücken-Birkenfeld (1753–1824)

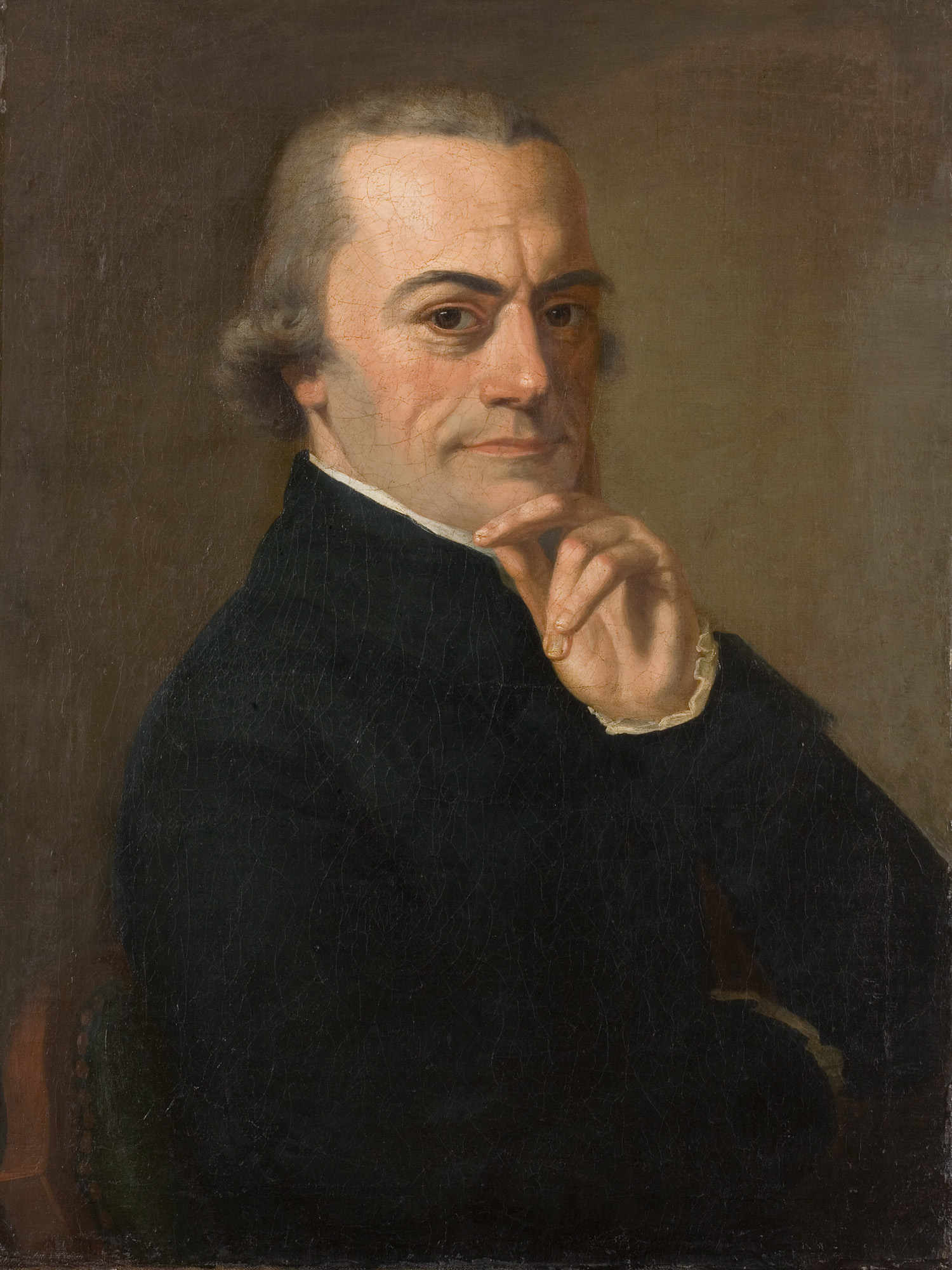
Lorenz von Westenrieder, 1803

Maximilian I Joseph of Bavaria, (1756–1825)

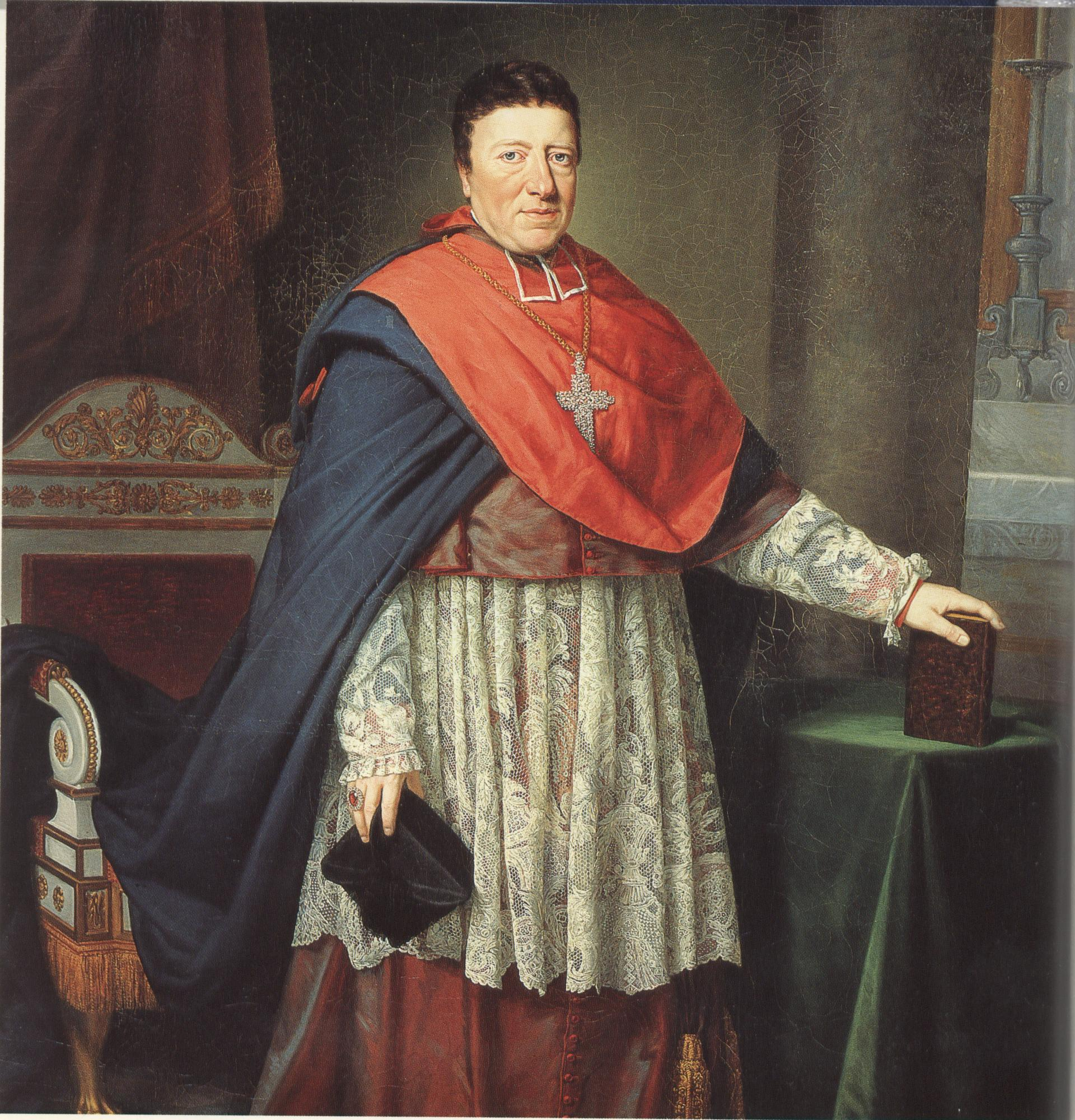
Lothar Anselm von Gebsattel, Erzbischof, (1761–1846)

Wilhelm von Kobell, Maler, {1766–1853}

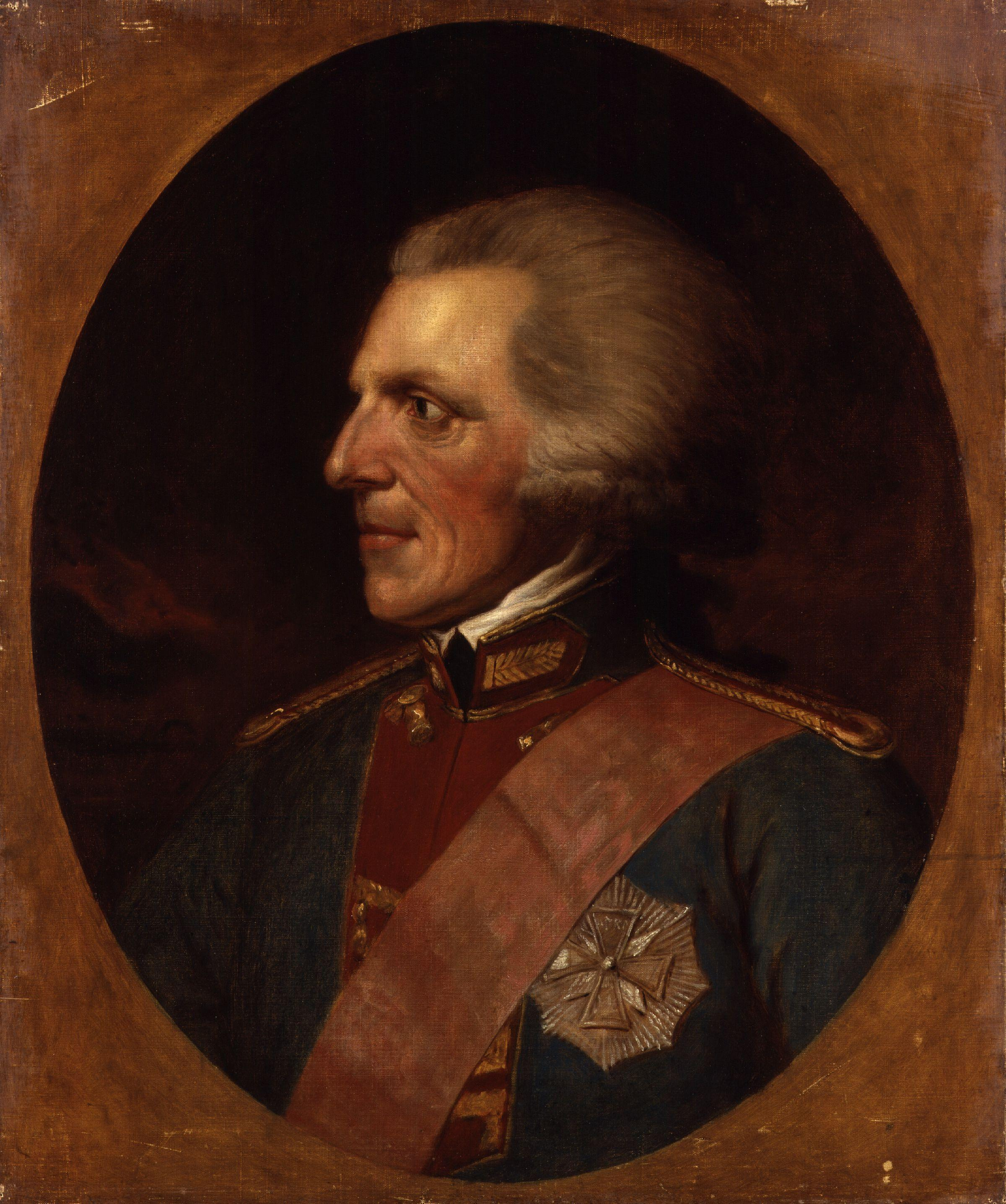
Benjamin Thompson, Graf von Rumford, (1783–1792)
