= Wolfgang Treu =

Wolfgang Treu may refer to:

- Wolfgang Treu (politician)
- Wolfgang Treu (cinematographer)
