= Hedwig Greve =

German painter (1850-1925)

- Born: 29 March 1850; Osnabrück, Kingdom of Prussia
- Died: 10 August 1925 (aged 75); Weilheim,Upper Bavaria
- Occupation: painter

Hedwig von Lepel-Gnitz, also known as Hedwig Greve (born 29 March 1850, in Osnabrück – died 10 August 1925, in Weilheim, Upper Bavaria), was a German genre and portrait painter.

== Life ==
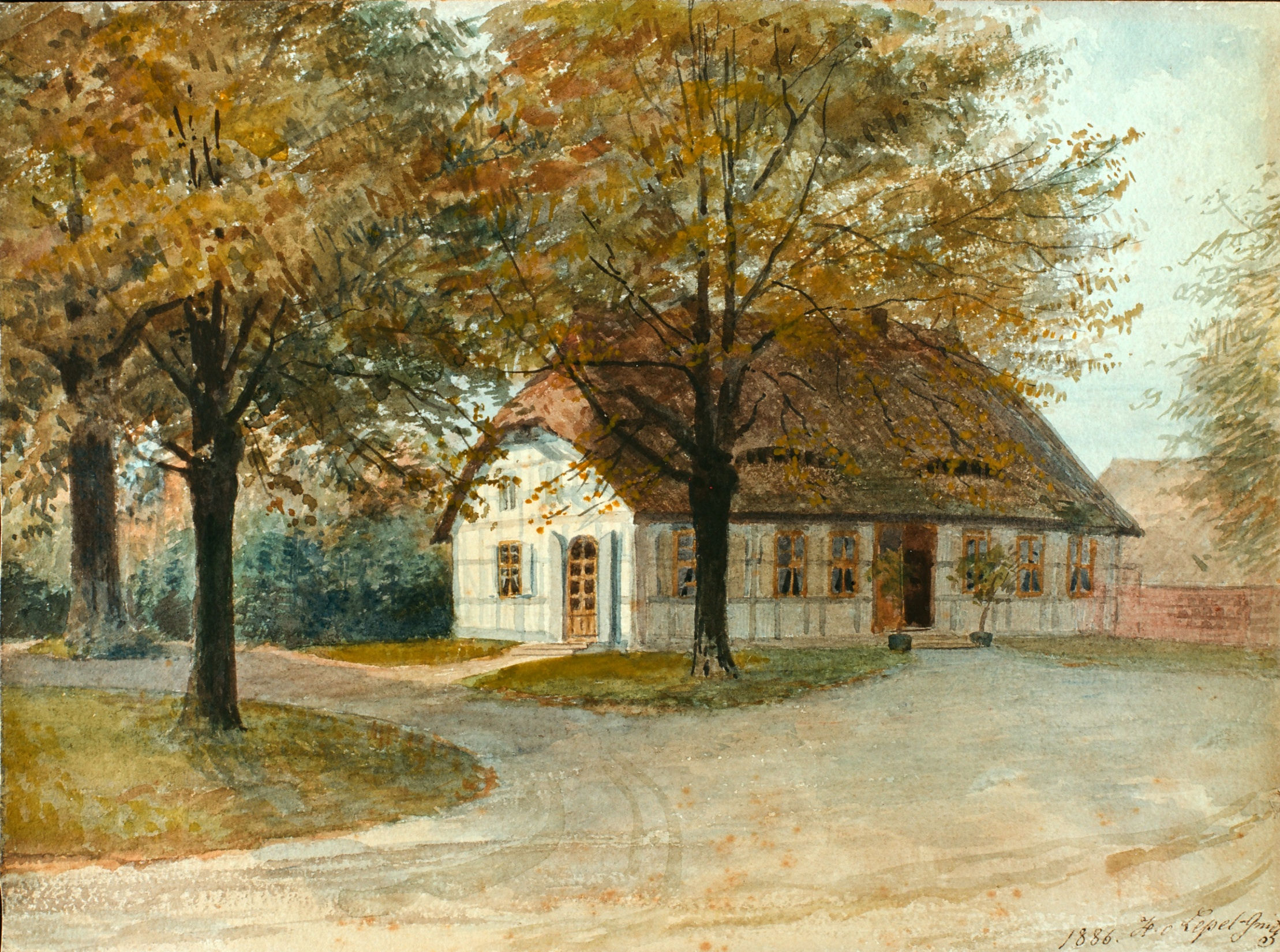
Painting by Hedwig Greve, 1886

Hedwig Greve was the daughter of Dr. Wilhelm Eduard Greve and Franziska Emma Seuss. She regularly attended the Kunstakademie Düsseldorf, where she was a student of Gustav Seuss (presumably her uncle). She then transferred to the Academy of Fine Arts, Munich, where she studied under Sándor Liezen-Mayer. After graduating, she worked as a portrait and genre painter. In 1875, she began her career with a portrait of her teacher, Seuss. From 1890 onward, her paintings, including portraits of Wilhelm I and Minister of Justice Heinrich von Friedberg, were frequently exhibited in Germany. She married the theatre director Bruno von Leppel-Gnitz on September 1880 in Rodenbeck near Minden.

== Works ==
=== Paintings (selection) ===
- Frauenportrait (In 1922, it became part of the collection of the Wallraf-Richartz Museum in Cologne)
- Andacht (1922 Part of the collection of the Chemnitzer Kunsthütte in Chemnitz)
- Alte Frau (1922 Part of the Collection of the Rudolfinums in Prague)
- Die Grablegung (The version of Christ according to Van Dyck in the family chapel in Lütow)

=== Writings ===
- Firlefinzchen und andere Märchen. Loewes Verlag Ferdinand Carl, Stuttgart 1905 (135 Seiten, illustriert mit vier Bunt- und 14 Tonbildern von Karl Fahringer)
- Märchenzauber. Loewes Verlag Ferdinand Carl, Stuttgart 1919 (136 Seiten, illustriert mit vier Bunt- und sieben Tonbildern von Karl Fahringer)
