= Yunhee Min =

South Korean-American artist

Yunhee Min (born 1962 Seoul, Korea) is a Korean-American artist. She lives and works in Los Angeles, California. In 1991 she received a BFA from ArtCenter College of Design. In 1993 she attended the Kunstakademie, Düsseldorf as a guest student under Professor Günther Uecker. In 2007 she received an MA in Design Studies from the Harvard University Graduate School of Design.

Min's two-fold art practice, which includes both painting and site-projects, is rooted in abstraction, as expressed through color, gesture, surface and form.

Her work has been featured in gallery and museum exhibitions including: Los Angeles County Museum of Art; UCLA Hammer Museum, Los Angeles; Yerba Buena Center for the Arts, San Francisco; Art Sonje Center, Seoul, Korea; Artists Space, New York; Museum of Contemporary Art, San Diego and others. She is represented by Vielmetter, Los Angeles and Miles McEnery Gallery, New York. In 2008, she co-founded Silvershed, an artist-run space in Chelsea, NYC with Patrick Meagher. Min is a recipient of the Korea Arts Foundation of America Artist Grant, the City of Los Angeles Cultural Affairs Individual Artist Grant, and University of California Institute for Research in the Arts Grant. In 2022 she was awarded a Guggenheim Fellowship in Fine Art.

Min is a Professor of Art at the University of California, Riverside.

== Public collections ==
- Los Angeles County Metropolitan Transportation Authority (LA Metro)
- UCLA Hammer Museum
- The Altoids Curiously Strong Collection
- Los Angeles County Museum of Art
- Nerman Museum of Contemporary Art
- Stuart House Collection
- Museum of Contemporary Art San Diego
- Museum of Contemporary Art Los Angeles
- Seattle Art Museum
- Microsoft Art Collection
- UBS Art Collection
