= Felix Schramm =

German artist (born 1970)

Felix Schramm (born 1970 in Hamburg) is a German artist who lives and works in Düsseldorf. Schramm's artwork revolves around displacement, which the sculptor addresses in different visual forms within his work. His understanding of sculpture takes the dialectics thereof as a point of departure, from which he generates his modes of spatially oriented work (installation / spatial intervention, sculpture, collage).

== Career ==
After studying sculpture at the Academie Di Belle Arti Di Firenze in Italy and at the Kunstakademie Düsseldorf under Jannis Kounellis and Walther Nikkels, study visits abroad in Tokyo and the Villa Massimo in Rome followed. Engaging with the relations of space and body has led to different approaches in Felix Schramm's sculptural work. The artist works in groups of works, which he arranges systematically through a conceptual allocation.

The group "Intersection" is composed of his sculptural, three-dimensional work, with which he undertakes positings in space. These are divided into the sub-groups "spatial intersection" and "corporal intersection".

"Spatial intersection" connotes his installations, which form a positing in a given space, while also breaking through it: These spatial structures break in upon the pre-existent space and establish visual axes along their surfaces and edges, which only become visible through the insertion of the elements. The exhibition space becomes the visual space. Felix Schramm usually works with industrially manufactured materials, however, they appear as organic growths in his processes of forming space.

"Corporal intersection" involves casts of body parts composed of different materials, which Schramm sometimes sculpts further, or conjoins in doublings or variations.

The group "Multilayer" encompasses collages made out of photographs taken by Felix Schramm of his three-dimensional installation pieces. The merging of torn photographic material produces two-dimensionally abstracted visual spaces of jagged edges and image planes. "Multilayer" refers to Schramm's installation work and simultaneously functions independently on a visual level as a form of spatial construction.

The "Accumulation" group comprises works that unite different aspects of the artist's individual groups of works: Various sculptural techniques of Schramm evolve into a spatial frame of reference. The freestanding installations can be circumnavigated and read in a dramaturgical sequence. They take effect as narrative organisms, which in turn perform a positing within space.

Felix Schramm negotiates shifts in various differentiated creative forms: he regards entirety in its recombinable parts, among them axes, rifts, warps, the potential alignment of the viewer's perspective, and, to that effect, points of intersection – in both a physical and allegorical sense. In Felix Schramm's sculptures and installations the surroundings of the object are seen as part of the space that defines the object. With this, Schramm produces formal systems that derive their structure from the dissolution of (architectural) order.

== Literature ==
"Felix Schramm, Intersection", Verlag für Moderne Kunst, Nuremberg 2012

"ABSTRAKT //// SKULPTUR", exhibition catalog, ed. Mark Wellmann, Berlin 2011

"2009 A-Z", Palais de Tokyo, Volume 3, #18, p. 126, Paris 2010

"Vitamin 3 D new Perspectives in Sculpture and Installation”, Phaidon press Inc. p. 10/268-269, 2009

"Felix Schramm, Savage, Salvage", exhibition catalog, De Vleeshal, Middleburg, 2008

"New Work: Felix Schramm", exhibition catalog, Museum of Modern Art, San Francisco 2007

"Felix Schramm, Soft Corrosion", exhibition catalog, WerkRaum.20 Piepenbrock, Berlin 2006
