= Luise Kimme =

German artist and sculptor

Luise Kimme (4 March 1939 - 19 April 2013) was a German artist, primarily a sculptor. She was a professor at the Kunstakademie Düsseldorf from 1976 to 2002.

Kimme was born in Bremen in 1939 and grew up in Berlin. She worked at a secretary for the German car company Borgward in London in 1957–58, and also worked as an artist's model.

She studied sculpture under Paul Dierkes at the Hochschule für Bildende Künste Berlin (the Berlin Academy of Fine Arts, now part of the Berlin University of the Arts) from 1959 to 1965. During this period she was a "living brush" used by Yves Klein to create his Anthropometry works. She then studied at Saint Martin's School of Art in London from 1966 to 1968, first under a Berlin Airlift Memorial Fellowship and then a British Council scholarship.

She lectured at Wolverhampton Polytechnic from 1968 to 1972, while also creating large fibreglass sculptures at a studio in London, including an 8 metres (26 ft) long untitled work exhibited outside the Laing Art Gallery in Newcastle upon Tyne in 1972 as part of the Peter Stuyvesant "Sculpture in the City" project. She taught at Rhode Island School of Design in 1973 to 1975, and then as a visiting professor at Stanislaus State College (now California State University, Stanislaus) at Turlock, California in 1975–76. She was a professor at the Kunstakademie Düsseldorf (Düsseldorf Art Academy) from 1976 to 2002.

She maintained a studio near Mount Irvine Bay Golf Club on the Caribbean island of Tobago from 1979. She moved to Tobago in 2002, and died of cancer there in 2013.

A museum of her work was established at her Tobago studio, The Castle. She is buried in the grounds of the museum.
