= Rolf Sackenheim =

German painter

- Born: September 26, 1921; Koblenz, Rhineland-Palatinate, Germany
- Died: January 9, 2006 (aged 84); Düsseldorf, North Rhine-Westphalia, Germany

Rolf Sackenheim (September 26, 1921 – January 9, 2006) was a German artist.

== Life and work ==
In 1940 Sackenheim studied arts at Meisterschule für Deutsches Handwerk (Masterschool of German craft) in Trier. The following year, he was drafted for military service, but in 1942 was retired due to a serious wound he had received. In 1943 he began to study art at Academy of Fine Arts, Karlsruhe. After a two-year-break in the years 1947–1950 he continued his studies under the instruction of Karl Hubbuch. In 1950 he moved to Eifel, where he painted in watercolors, did drawings and worked out his theoretical statements on painting. Two years later he went to Kunstakademie Düsseldorf, where he was awarded "Master scholar" (Meisterschüler) of Otto Coester in the same year.

From 1960 on he became guest lecturer at the Werkkunstschule in Krefeld (School of arts and crafts). In 1963, he became regular lecturer at the Kunstakademie Düsseldorf, later received the title of professor and became head of the Class of Printmaking. From 1969 to 1970 and from 1972 to 1976 he also was the vice director of the academy. In 1984, he was awarded honorary member of the Academy of Fine Arts, Münster. He retired in 1984 in Düsseldorf and kept on painting. His art works, pictures, etchings and graphic art were shown in multiple exhibitions as well as many personal shows.

== Bibliography ==
- Rolf Sackenheim : graphische Arbeiten 1950 – 1985. Staatliche Kunstakademie Düsseldorf. Der Kleine Verlag, Düsseldorf 1985. ISBN 3-924166-08-0.
- Paul Good, Die nervöse Hand : zur Semantik der Linien von Rolf Sackenheim. DuMont, Köln 1991. ISBN 3-7701-2969-5.
- Rolf Sackenheim : Handzeichnungen, Druckgraphik und Mappenwerke. Aus dem Besitz des Clemens-Sels-Museums. Museum, Neuss 1992.
- Rolf Sackenheim : Zeichnungen 1946 – 1987. Förderverein Museum Schloss Moyland e.V., Bedburg-Hau 1991.
- Brigitte Schmidt, Manfred Schmidt (eds.), Rolf Sackenheim : Photographien. Galerie Art 204, Düsseldorf 1994.
- Arbeitsgemeinschaft 28 Düsseldorfer Galerien (ed.): Düsseldorfer Avantgarden. Persönlichkeiten, Bewegungen, Orte. Richter Verlag, Düsseldorf 1995, ISBN 3-928762-45-1.
- Paul Good (ed.), Organon & Harfe : der Künstler Rolf Sackenheim. Parerga, Düsseldorf, Bonn 1996. ISBN 3-930450-07-0.
- Rolf Sackenheim : Werke im Wilhelm Lehmbruck Museum Duisburg. Wilhelm Lehmbruck Museum, Duisburg 1996. ISBN 3-89279-525-8. (October 6 – November 17, 1996).
- Rolf Sackenheim : kreuz und quer. Galerie Art 204, Düsseldorf 2001.
- Rolf Sackenheim – Zeichnungen, Radierungen, Lithographien. Museum Wiesbaden, Wiesbaden 2003. ISBN 3-89258-052-9. (Museum Wiesbaden, March 23 – June 1, 2003)
- Rolf Sackenheim : frühe Sprünge – weite Schwünge. Galerie Art 204, Düsseldorf 2004.
- Sackenheim, Franta, Hofschen, González Bravo. Galerie Art 204, Düsseldorf 2005.
