= Johannes Hüppi =

Swiss painter

Johannes Hüppi (born 1965) is a Swiss painter.

The son of Alfonso Hüppi, Johannes Hüppi studied fine arts at the Kunstakademie Düsseldorf from 1984 to 1990, where he was a student of Fritz Schwegler and Dieter Krieg. From 1997 to 2000 he ran a studio in New York City and in 2000/2001 in Miami, Florida. Since 2004 he lives and works in Basel.

From 2004 to 2007 Hüppi was Professor of Painting at the Hochschule für Bildende Künste Braunschweig.
