= Thomas Grünfeld =

German artist & professor

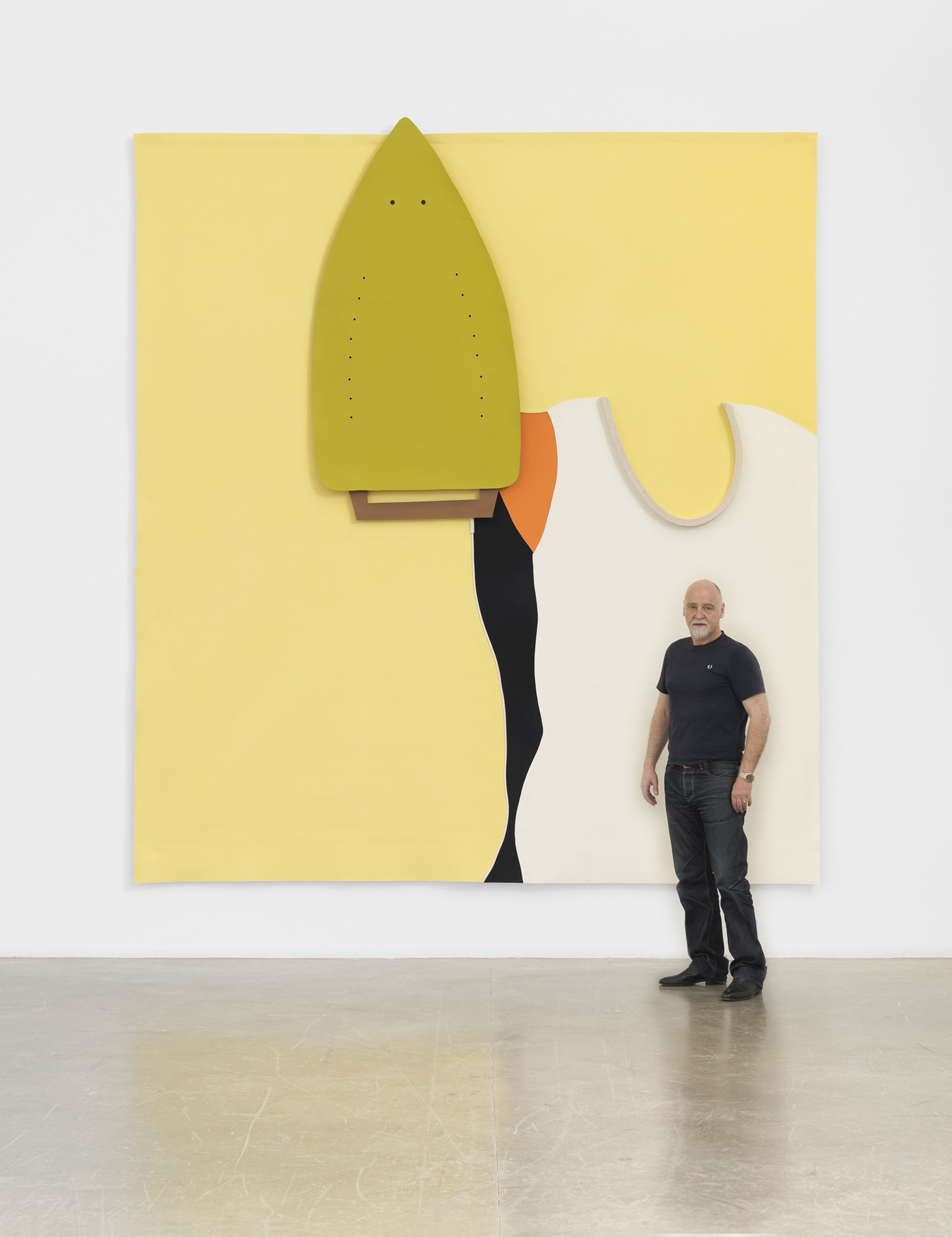

Thomas Grünfeld (born 29 June, 1956 in Leverkusen) is a German artist. He is Professor for Sculpture at the Kunstakademie Düsseldorf since 2004. He lives and works in Cologne and Casola in Lunigiana.

== Life ==
From 1978 to 1983, Thomas Grünfeld studied at the State Academy of Fine Arts in Stuttgart (class of Paul Uwe Dreyer). In 1986, his second exhibition at the Tanja Grunert Gallery in Cologne showed works which, influenced by Richard Artschwager, oscillate between art objects and apparent usability. The names of English gentlemen's clubs were used as titles.

In 1990, at the first presentation of his animal preparations (misfits) at the Karsten Schubert Ltd. gallery in London, animal rights activists provoked a scandal, resulting in police intervention. In 1997, in the exhibition Déformation Professionnelle at the Kölnischer Kunstverein (Cologne), he combined two of his work groups (misfits and rubbers) with dresses from the summer collection '97 by Rei Kawakubo (Comme des Garçons), which focussed on the deformation of the female body. In 2008, Grünfeld made his first attempt to bring together as many of his work groups as possible in one exhibition in the Thébaïde exhibition at Galerie Michael Janssen in Berlin. In 2013, the Museum Morsbroich in Leverkusen presented the artist's first retrospective, which then travelled 2014 to the Villa Croce Museum of Contemporary Art in Genoa.

== Work ==
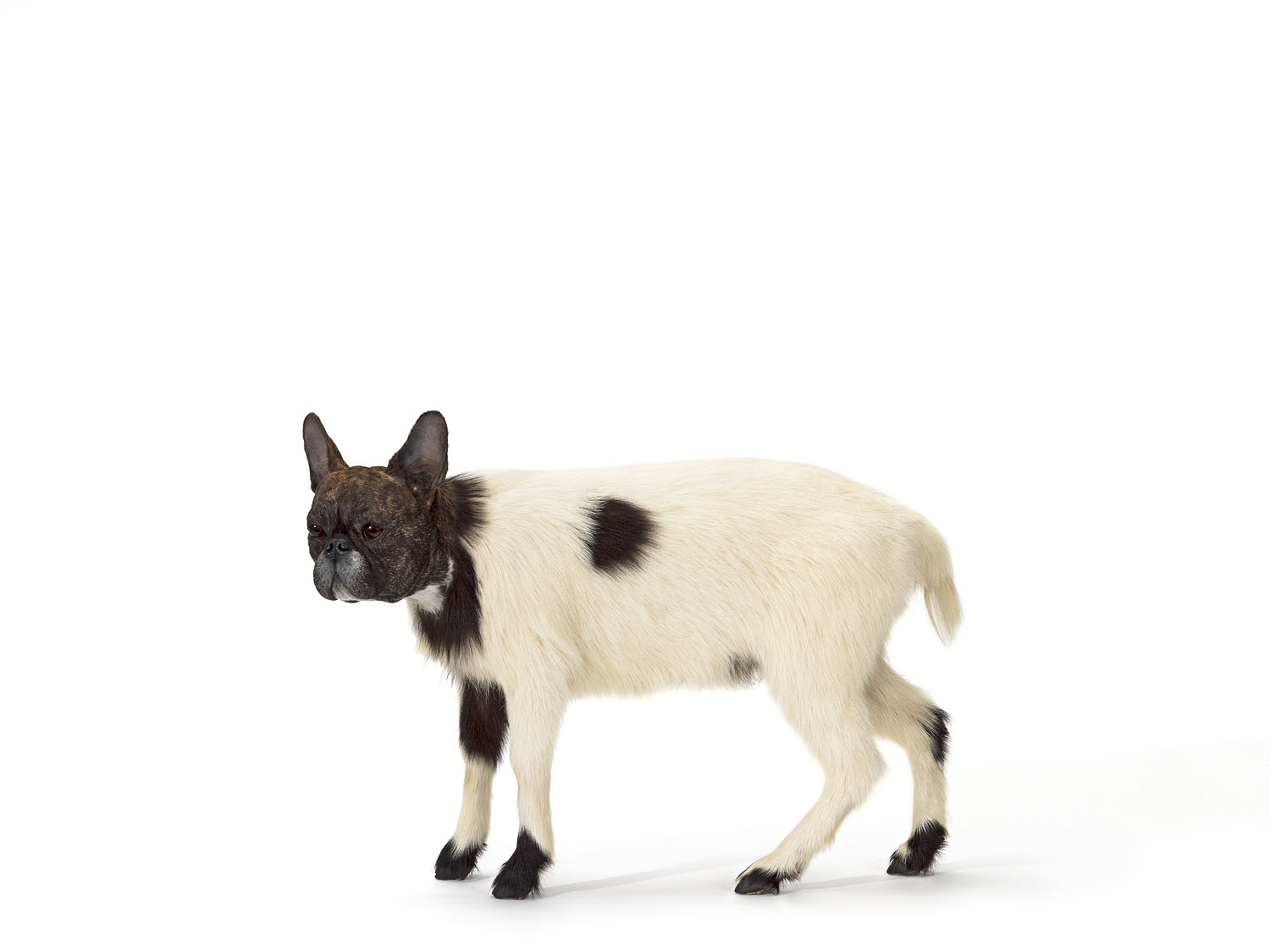
From the work group „misfits“

His work is characterised by strictly separate groups of works. The best known is that of his animal preparations (misfits), each composed of different species (since 1990). The other groups of works since 1986: trays, skirts, cushions, rubbers, eye pictures and felts.

== Exhibitions (selection) ==
Works 1981–2013, with a list solo exhibitions, published in: Biography Thomas Grünfeld, 2013.

- 1986: Galerie Tanja Grunert, Cologne
- 1989: Einleuchten; Will, Vorstel und Simul in HH (curated by Harald Szeemann), Deichtorhallen Hamburg
- 1990: misfits I-VII, Karsten Schubert Ltd, London
- 1990: Aperto, Venice Biennale
- 1992: Humpty Dumpty's Kaleidoscope, A New Generation of German Artists, Museum of Contemporary Art Australia, Sydney
- 1994: Frankenstein: Exploration in Manipulations and Surrationality, Art Gallery of Ontario (AGO), Toronto
- 1997: Young German Artists II, Saatchi Gallery, London
- 1997: Déformation Professionnelle, Kölnischer Kunstverein, Cologne
- 2003: OUTLOOK (curated by Christos M. Joachimides), Benaki Museum, Athens
- 2008: Thébaïde, Galerie Michael Janssen, Berlin
- 2013: Thomas Grünfeld - homey. Works from 1981 to 2013, Morsbroich Museum, Leverkusen
- 2014: Thomas Grünfeld - homey. Works from 1981 to 2013, Villa Croce Museum of Contemporary Art, Genoa
- 2025: Freaks of Nature – Thomas Grünfeld & die Faszination von Mischwesen, 11. April bis 26. Oktober 2025, Schloss Benrath, Düsseldorf

== Collections ==
- Barcelona, CAL CEGO Collection (ES)
- Berlin, National Gallery (Berlin) (GER)
- Düsseldorf, Akademiegalerie (GER)
- Hamburg, Falckenberg Collection (GER)
- Hannover, Sprengel Museum (GER)
- Leverkusen, Morsbroich Museum (GER)
- Lisbon, Berardo Collection Museum (P)
- Louisville, Museum 21Century (USA)
- Metz, Frac Lorraine (F)
- Mexico City, Museo Universitario Arte Contemporáneo (MEX)
- Oiron, Château d'Oiron (F)
- Paris, Centre Pompidou (F)
- Rotterdam, Caldic Collection (NL)
- Rotterdam, Museum Boijmans Van Beuningen (NL)
- Stuttgart, Staatsgalerie Stuttgart (GER)
- Stuttgart, Kunstmuseum (GER)
- Stuttgart, Sammlung Landesbank Baden-Württemberg (GER)
- Toulouse, Les Abattoirs (F)
- Wolfsburg, Kunstmuseum (GER)

== Prizes and awards ==
- 2015: Prize of the Dieter Krieg Foundation

== Literature ==
- Udo Kittelmann (ed.): Déformation Professionnelle, Hatje Cantz Verlag, Ostfildern 1999, ISBN 978-3-89322-358-9.
- Uta Grosenick (ed.): Art at the Turn of the Millenium, Taschen Verlag, Cologne 1999, ISBN 978-3-8228-7195-9.
- Erika Költzsch (ed.): GRÜN FELD FELT, Text: Hans Irrek, Galerie Haas AG, Zurich 2010, ISBN 978-3-033-02534-9.
- Hidde van Seggelen Gallery (ed.): young Steerer (junger Lenker), Text: Magnus Mills, London 2011, ISBN 978-0-9555763-2 -
- Galerie Klaus Gerrit Friese (ed.): Über, DruckVerlag Kettler, Bönen 2012, ISBN 978-3-86206-170-9
- Fritz Emslander (ed. ): Thomas Grünfeld - Homey (accompanying exhibition catalogue of his first retrospective at Museum Morsbroich Leverkusen), Verlag Kettler, Bönen (Westphalia) 2013, ISBN 978-3-86206-254-6
- Corbett vs. Dempsey (ed.): Almanac, Chicago 2015, ISBN 978-0-9963510-4-1
