= Patrick Meagher (artist) =

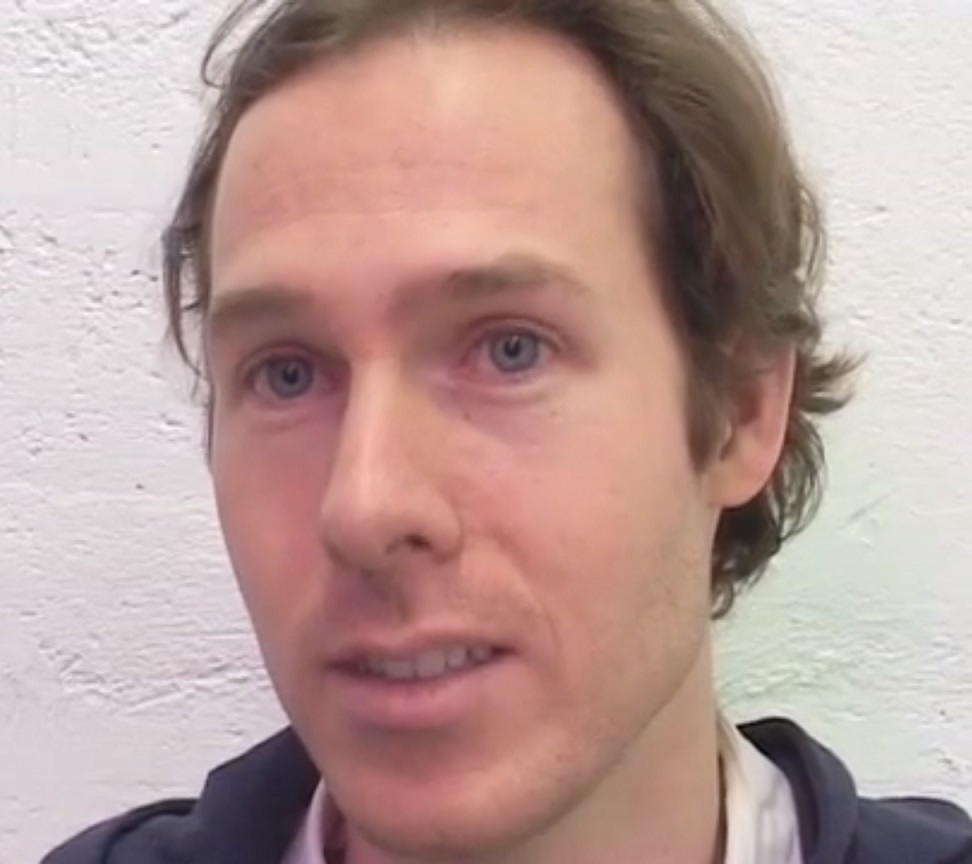
Patrick Meagher

Patrick Meagher (born 1973 in Manhattan, New York) is an artist, curator and arts organizer based in New York City and the Catskills. He holds a Master of Landscape Architecture degree from Harvard University, a BFA from Carnegie Mellon, and has studied at MIT and the Kunstakademie Düsseldorf under Swiss artist Alfonso Huppi.

Meagher is a post-conceptual artist who works in painting, sculpture, installation, and video. His work explores the emotional and spiritual impact of the digital age. He has also written for art publications and works as an art organizer and curator.

He is a co-founder of the Silvershed artist collective in Chelsea, New York. Silvershed has been featured in Harper's Bazaar and on the cover of Art Review, as a space for creative thinking and collaboration with projects in New York, Berlin and Los Angeles.

With curators Melinda Wang and Yunhee Min he co-founded the Collective Show, a grassroots arts advocacy project which brought together artist collectives for “group shows of group shows,” working with over 130 contemporary art collectives of over 1,100 individual artists for shows in New York City, Los Angeles, and Mexico City.

He was a commissioned artist and collaborator at Eyebeam in 2006.

Exhibitions

In 2002, at the New Museum of Contemporary Art's Out of Site: A Group Show of Fictional Architectural Space, Meagher's interactive computer projection showed "architecture in the process of change," and his work Flight Path was exhibited at the Socrates Sculpture Park. Both were reviewed by Holland Cotter in the New York Times. His art has been exhibited in New York at the Dorsky Museum, MoMA PS1, Eyebeam Art and Technology Center, the Storefront for Art and Architecture, with E-flux, and at the Night of 1,000 Drawings benefit at Artists Space. In 2015 he was in group shows at the Hyde Park Art Center in Chicago, at L&M Arts in Los Angeles, and at the inaugural exhibition of the New York Artists Equity Association's Equity Gallery. Meagher curated a booth at the SPRING/BREAK Art Show in Los Angeles in 2024.

== Catalogues ==
- Moukhtar Kocache and Erin Shirreff, New York, 2004 Site Matters: The Lower Manhattan Cultural Council's World Trade Center Artist Residency 1997–2001, ISBN 0-9726973-1-4

== Books ==
- Neil Ramsay, Patrick Meagher, Alfred Steiner, Sha Weï, Jamie-May Minjie, Lydia Smith, ANTONYM: An IRL/URL Exhibit of Text-based Art & Poetry NFTs, Crome Yellow Press: San Francisco, 2022, ISBN 979-8987287033
