= Joseph Kellerhoven =

German portrait painter (1789–1849)

Joseph Willibald Kellerhoven
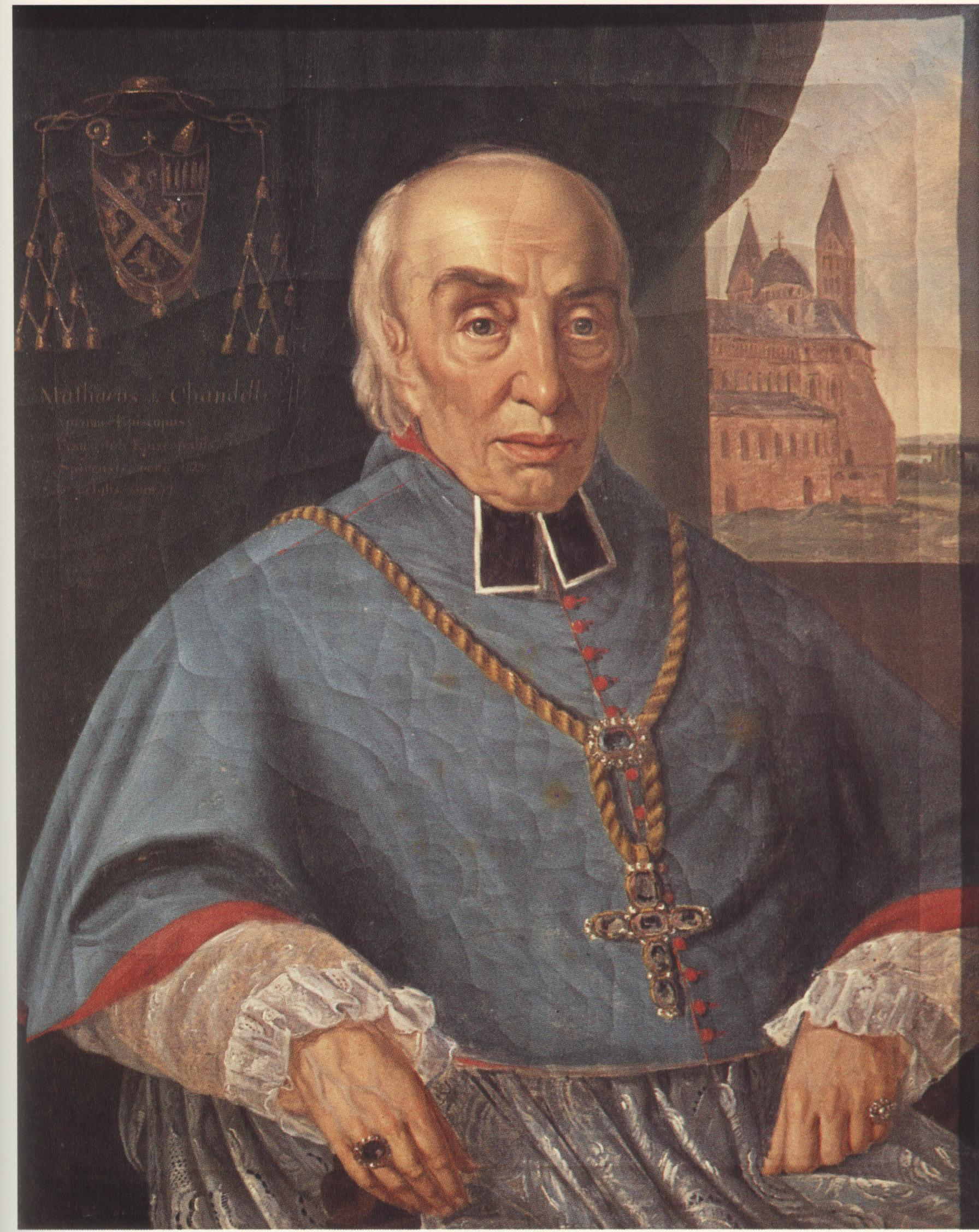
- Portrait of Bishop Matthäus Georg von Chandelle
- Born: April 27, 1789; Mannheim, Electorate of Bavaria, Holy Roman Empire
- Died: June 18, 1849 (aged 60); Speyer, Kingdom of Bavaria
- Education: Academy of Fine Arts, Munich
- Occupation: Painter
- Years active: c. 1814–1842
- Known for: Portrait painting
- Spouse(s): Friederike Feiler (m. 1818; died 1827); Elisabeth Werner (m. 1840)
- Parent: Moritz Kellerhoven (father)

Joseph Willibald Kellerhoven (27 April 1789 – 18 June 1849) was a German portrait painter.

== Biography ==
Kellerhoven was born and raised in Mannheim, Germany. He was the son of Moritz Kellerhoven, court painter for Charles Theodore, Elector of Bavaria and, in 1808, one of the first professors at the expanded Academy of Fine Arts, Munich.

Kellerhoven entered the Academy in 1809 and received practical training in the history painting department. His father was his primary teacher, but he also studied with Joseph Hauber, Andreas Seidl and Johann Georg von Dillis. He exhibited his works for the first time in 1814.

In 1818, he married Friederike Feiler, the daughter of Friedrich Feiler, an official in the Prussian Ministry of War. Shortly after, he moved to Speyer, to accept a position as a drawing teacher at the Royal gymnasium. In 1825, the city opened a trade school, so he left the gymnasium to accept a similar position there, as the salary was higher. Friederike died two years later, aged only twenty-nine. Both of their sons died before reaching adulthood.

After 1839, he worked as an art teacher at the newly-established Catholic school. In 1840, he remarried, to Elisabeth Werner, the daughter of a local landowner. The marriage remained childless.

In 1842, he suffered what was most likely a brain hemorrhage, which left him partially paralyzed and unable to work. Elisabeth cared for him in Speyer until his death, seven years later.

== Sources ==
- Fritz Klotz: "Der Speyerer Maler Joseph Kellerhoven". In Pfälzer Heimat, 1965, pps.8–11
- Viktor Carl: Lexikon Pfälzer Persönlichkeiten. Hennig Verlag, Edenkoben, 2004, pg. 434 ISBN 978-3-9804668-5-1
- Georg Kaspar Nagler: Neues allgemeines Künstler-Lexicon. Vol. 6, Munich, 1838, pg. 555 Online @ Google Books
