= Catharina Treu =

German painter

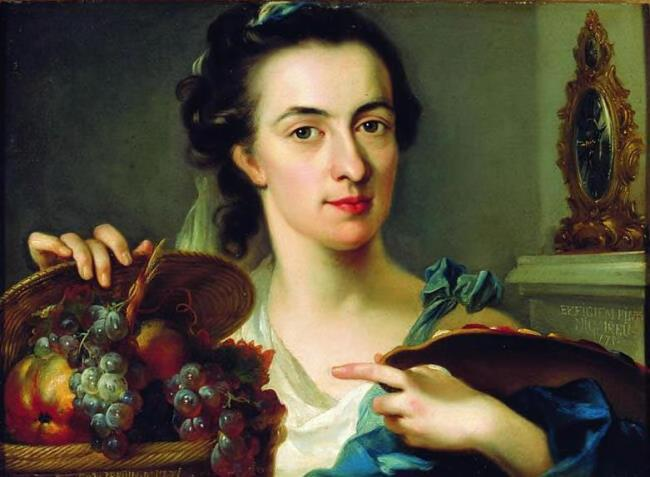
- 1771 portrait of Catharina by her brother Nikolaus with an example of her work by herself
- Born: 21 May 1743; Bamberg
- Died: 11 October 1811 (aged 68); Mannheim

Catharina Treu (21 May 1743 – 11 October 1811) was a German still life painter, and court painter for Charles Theodore, Elector of Bavaria in 1769.

Treu was born in Bamberg in a family of painters. She was taught to paint along with her brothers and sisters by their father, Joseph Marquard Treu, in Bamberg. She became a local celebrity for her copies of 17th-century still life paintings and was selected by the Prince-Bishop of Bamberg, Adam Friedrich von Seinsheim, to paint a few overdoors for his Würzburg Residence in 1762. This caused her work to become more widely known and she received a commission for overdoors in Schloss Bruchsal in 1766. In the same year she followed the move of the court of Charles Theodore to Schloss Benrath in Düsseldorf where she was appointed the first female teacher under Lambert Krahe at the Kunstakademie Düsseldorf.

== Copies ==
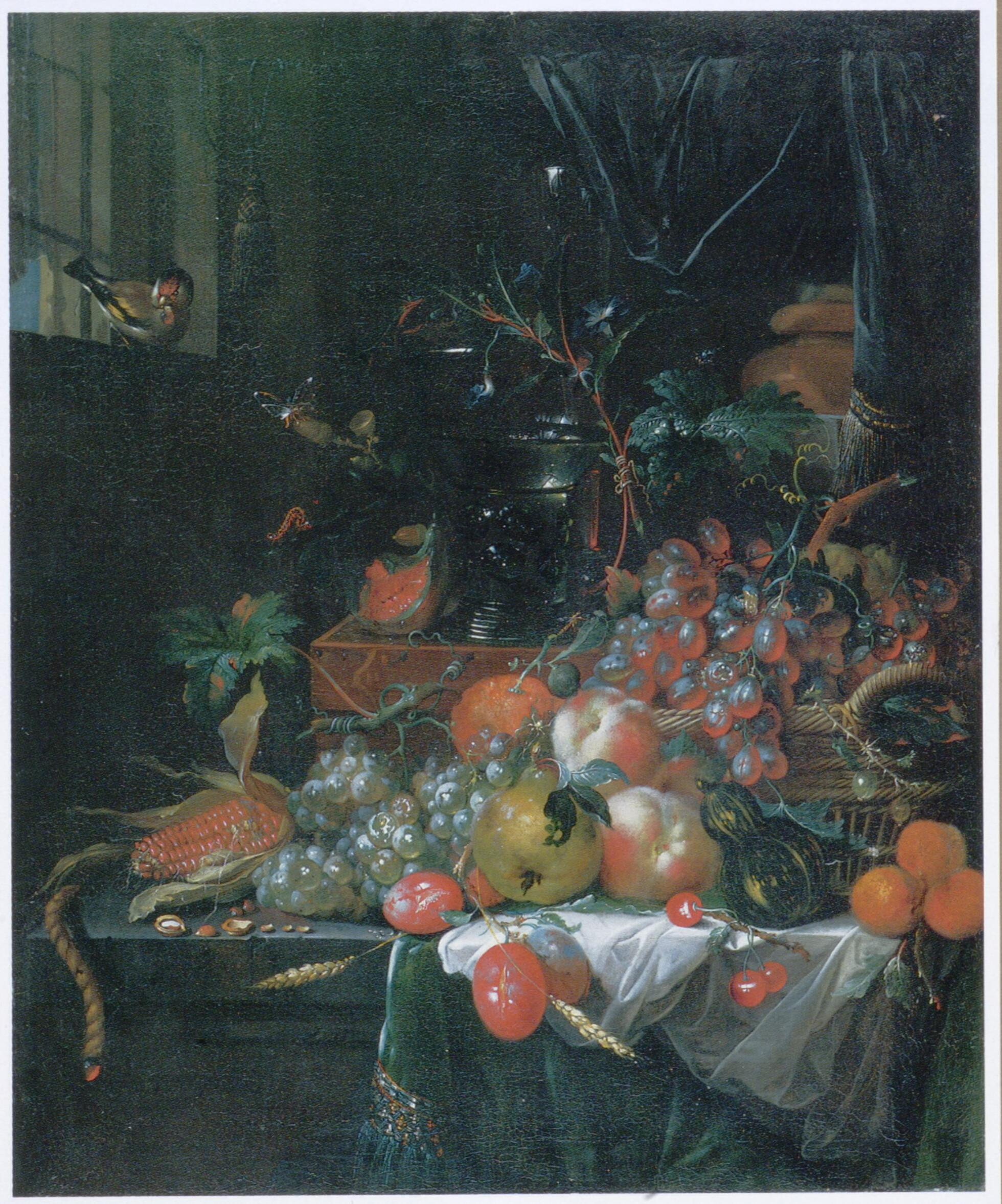
Copy by Treu, 1760s?

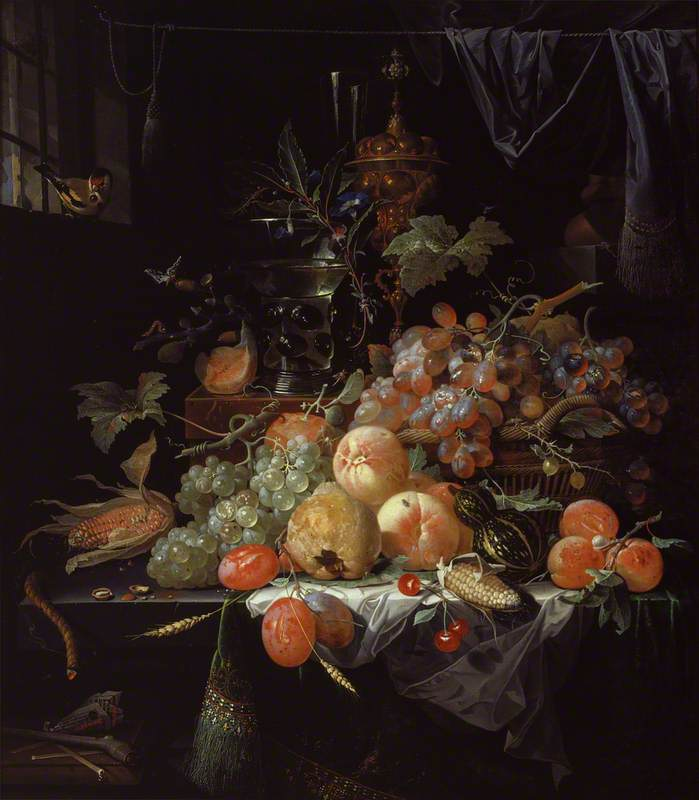
Original by Abraham Mignon, c.1670

In 1769 she received the court painter title of cabinet painter for Charles Theodore's second residence at Mannheim Palace. When he moved to Munich, she remained in Düsseldorf where she married Jakob Konig in 1781. After this period several of her paintings are listed in inventories as by Mme König. Due to the bombing and other war damage to installed paintings by her hand in various buildings, her works today are mostly known from archives and inventories, though she died a notable resident of Mannheim.

== Works ==
She is best known for her works in series, often produced as overdoors in large palaces. Here is a pair of pendants that came into the collection of the Margraves and Granddukes of Baden in 1803. Dated 1768, they were possibly painted for the palace in Mannheim.

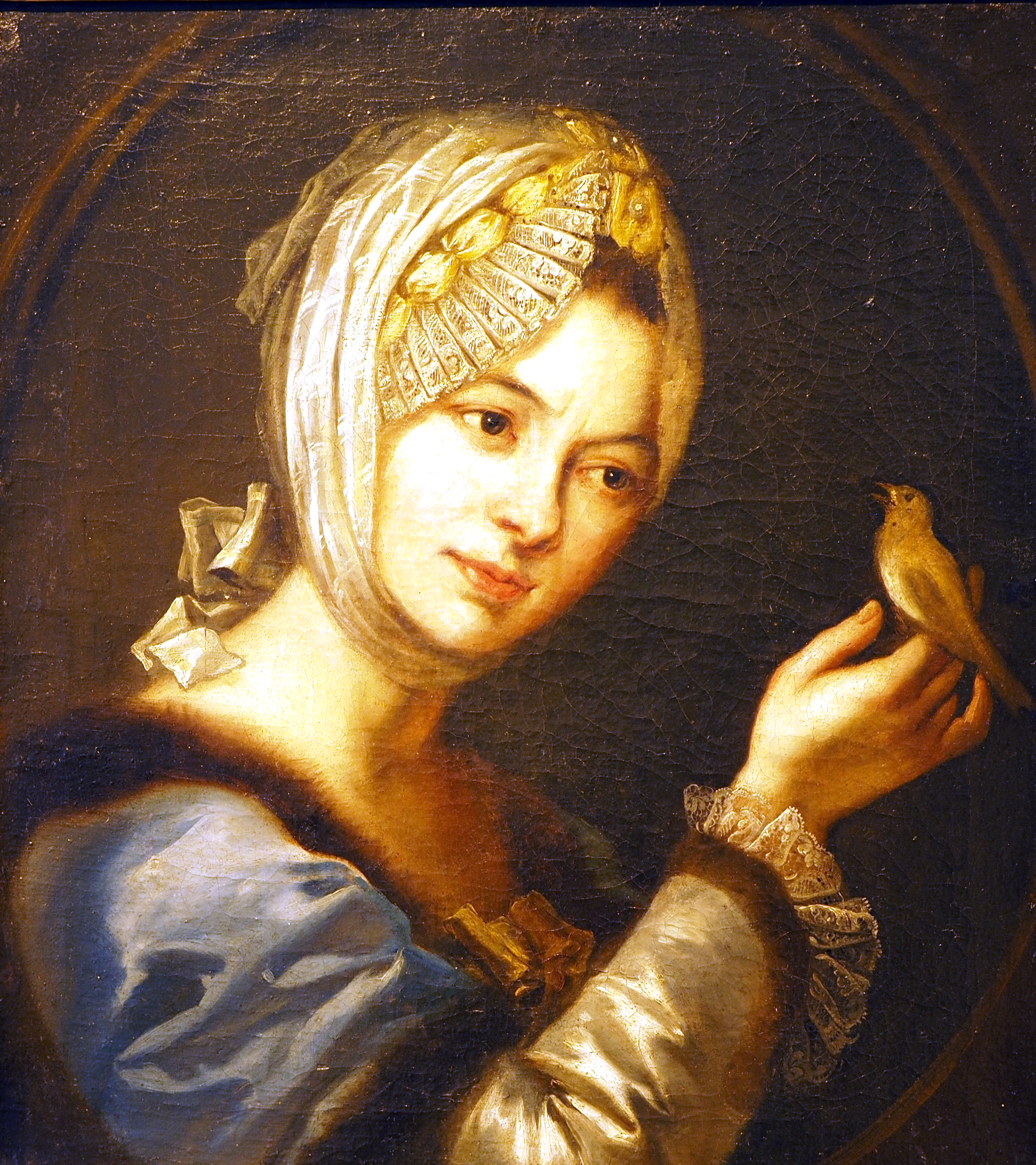
A woman with a bird on the indexfinger of the right hand, 1786

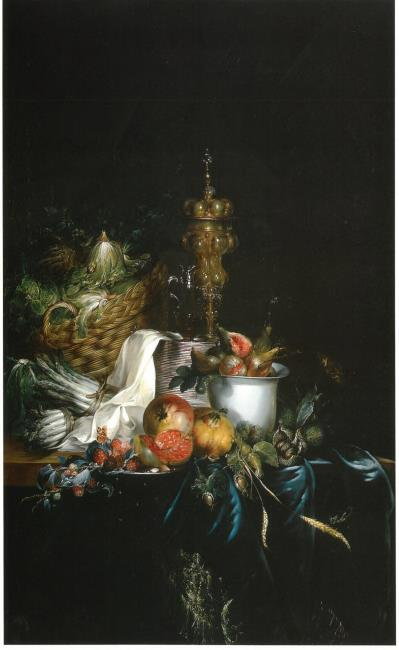
Sumptuous table with fruit and covered beaker, 1768

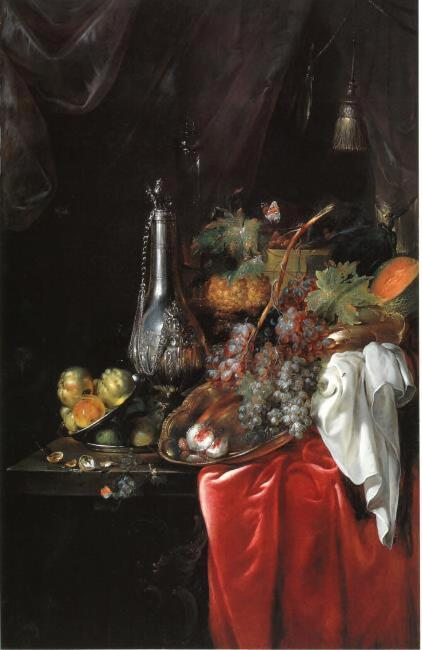
Sumptuous table with fruit and silverware, 1768
