= Johann Peter von Langer =

German painter (1756–1824)

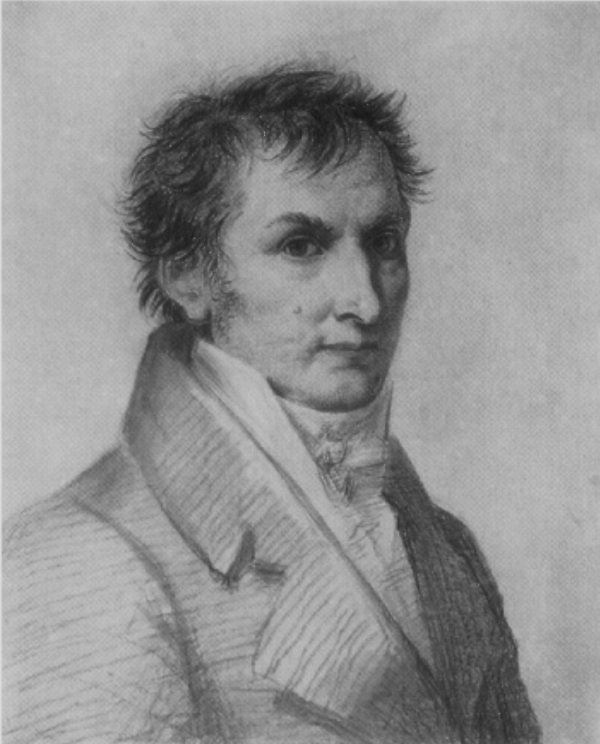
Johann Peter von Langer; chalk drawing by Marie Ellenrieder

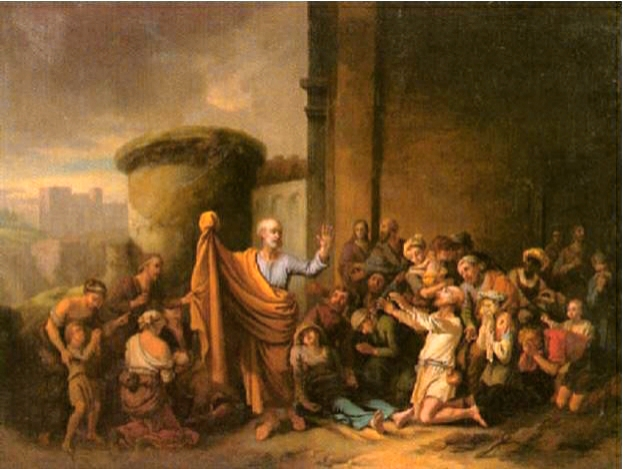
Saint Peter Raising Tabitha From the Dead

Johann Peter Langer, after 1808, von Langer (baptized 1 July 1756, Kalkum – 6 August 1824, Munich) was a German painter, engraver and wallpaper designer.

== Biography ==
His father, Anton Langer (1721–1788), was the gardener for the Hatzfeld family at their estate surrounding Schloss Kalkum. He began his studies in 1775, under Lambert Krahe at the Kunstakademie Düsseldorf, where he won second prize at the Academy exhibition of 1776 and first prize, which came with a scholarship, in 1778.

In 1781, he married Maria Josepha Kleyen (1760–1843), daughter of the engraver Johann Joseph Kleyen, and they had three sons. She created etchings under the name "Josephine Langen" and one of their sons, Robert, also became a well-known painter.

He was named a professor at the academy in 1784. Five years later, after a lengthy study trip in Holland, he became its director. In 1794, when the War of the First Coalition brought a halt to activities at the academy, he and his family moved to Duisburg, where he and the entrepreneur, Johann Böninger (1756–1810), created the "Mechanographische Institut"; producing flower- and figure-patterned wallpaper. Their product was displayed at fairs throughout Germany, and Johann Wolfgang von Goethe was said to be one of their regular customers.

In 1801, after the Treaty of Lunéville redrew France's borders, Böninger moved the factory to Paris to avoid the new import taxes. Langer returned to Düsseldorf, where he helped resurrect the academy and once more took up his position as director, with special attention to the art gallery. In 1806, when the gallery was moved to Munich, he followed it there and became the first director of the new Academy of Fine Arts. In 1808, he was elevated to the nobility. He retained his position as director until his death in 1824 and was succeeded by Peter von Cornelius

His paintings were mostly religious in nature. Many of his sketches and drawings are preserved at the Staatliche Graphische Sammlung in Munich.
