= Weilheim =

Weilheim is the name of several towns in Germany:

- Weilheim in Oberbayern, capital of the district Weilheim-Schongau
- Weilheim (electoral district), comprising Weilheim-Schongau and Garmisch-Partenkirchen
- Weilheim, Baden-Württemberg, a municipality in the district of Waldshut
- Weilheim an der Teck, a town in the district Esslingen
- A part of Tübingen
- A part of Rietheim-Weilheim
- A part of Hechingen
- A part of Blindheim
- A part of Monheim, Bavaria
