= John Whetton Ehninger =

American painter

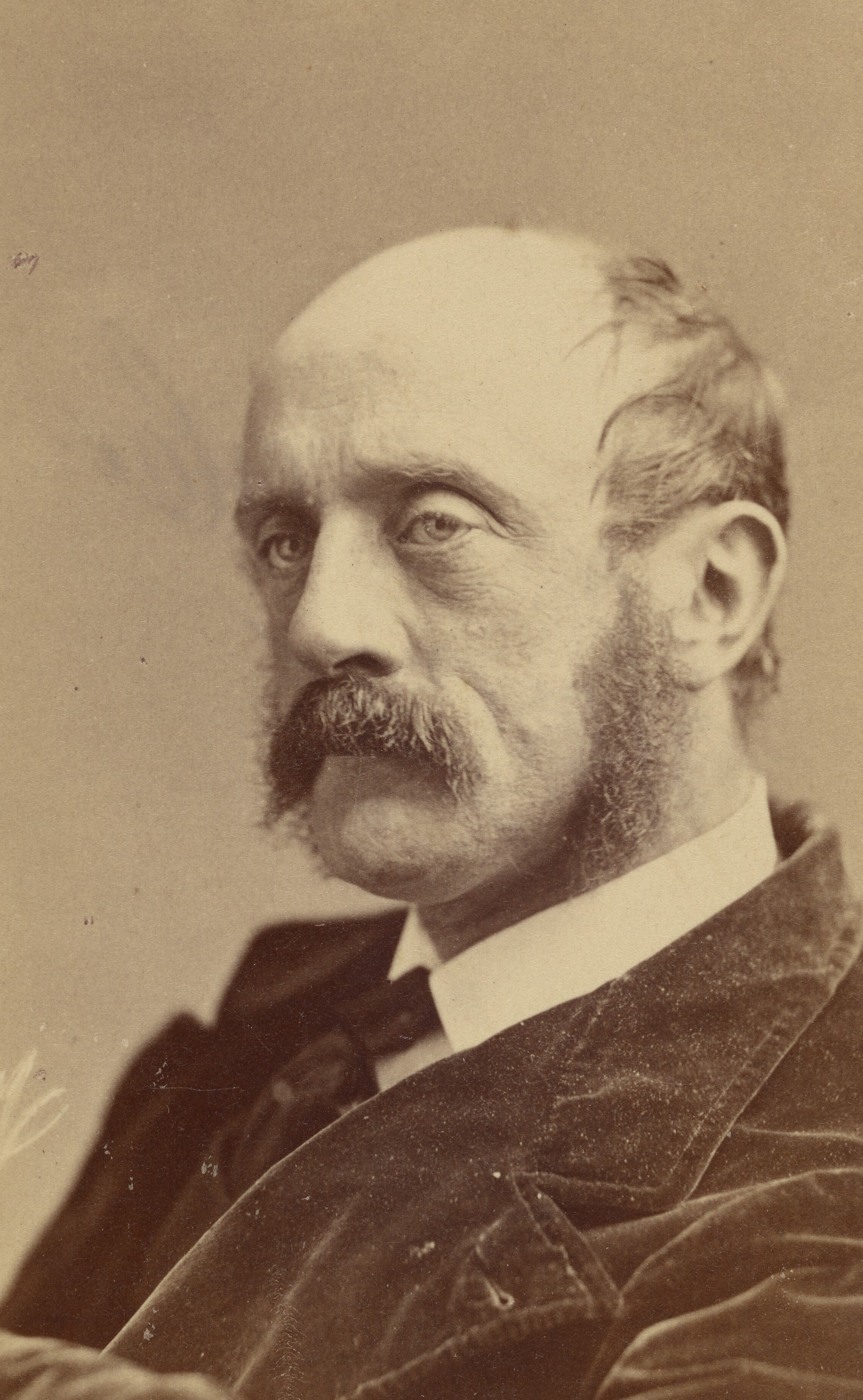
- Born: July 22, 1827; New York City, New York, U.S
- Died: January 22, 1889 (aged 61); Saratoga, New York, U.S.
- Occupations: painter, etcher

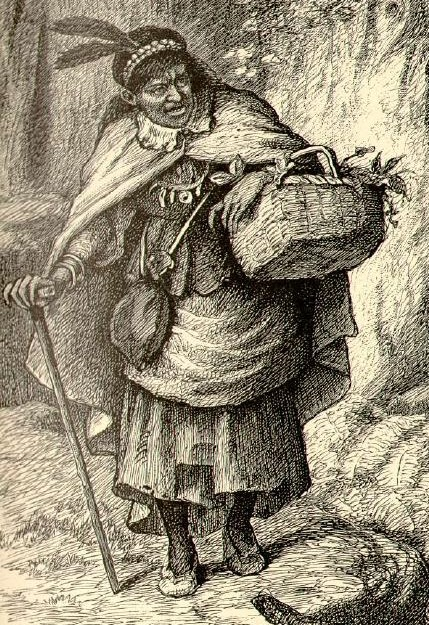
Tituba, detail from an illustration by Ehninger of a poem by Henry Wadsworth Longfellow

John Whetten Ehninger (July 22, 1827, in New York City – January 22, 1889, in Saratoga, New York) was an American painter and etcher.

== Biography ==
He graduated from Columbia University in 1847. He was a pupil of Thomas Couture in Paris from 1848 until 1849, and afterward studied at Düsseldorf and other art centres 1851 to 1853.

Ehninger moved to Europe after graduating from Columbia University. There, he pursued his academic training in France, Germany, and Italy. A budding artist, he was eager to learn more about the old masters and to hone his skills. He spent some time in Germany. During his time there he developed a penchant for drawing scenes of daily life, a trait that was to remain for the rest of his career.

== Return to New York ==
After nearly three years in Europe, Ehninger returned to the U.S. and began living in New York City. Six years of working and exhibiting in the city followed. In 1860, he became a member of the National Academy of Design. Ehninger took another trip to Europe. After returning from that trip he settled in Newport, Rhode Island. A few years after, in 1872, he moved to Saratoga, New York, where he spent the rest of his life.

Among his paintings, which include landscape and figure subjects, are:

- "Peter Stuyvesant" (1850)
- "Autumn Landscape" (1867)
- "Monk" (1871)
- "Vintage in the Valtella" (1877)
- "Twilight from the Bridge of Pau" (1878)
- "Death and the Gambler" (Saratoga, 1895)
- "New England Farmyard"
- "Yankee Peddler"
- "Love me, Love my Horse"
- "The Foray"
- "The Sword"
- "Lady Jane Grey"
- "Christ Healing the Sick"

He was a clever and versatile draftsman and is best known for his illustrations of Longfellow's Miles Standish (1858), Irving's Dolph Heylinger and Ye Legend of St. Gwendolyn (1867). The drawings for the latter were considered so delicate, that they were reproduced by photography — an unusual method in that day.

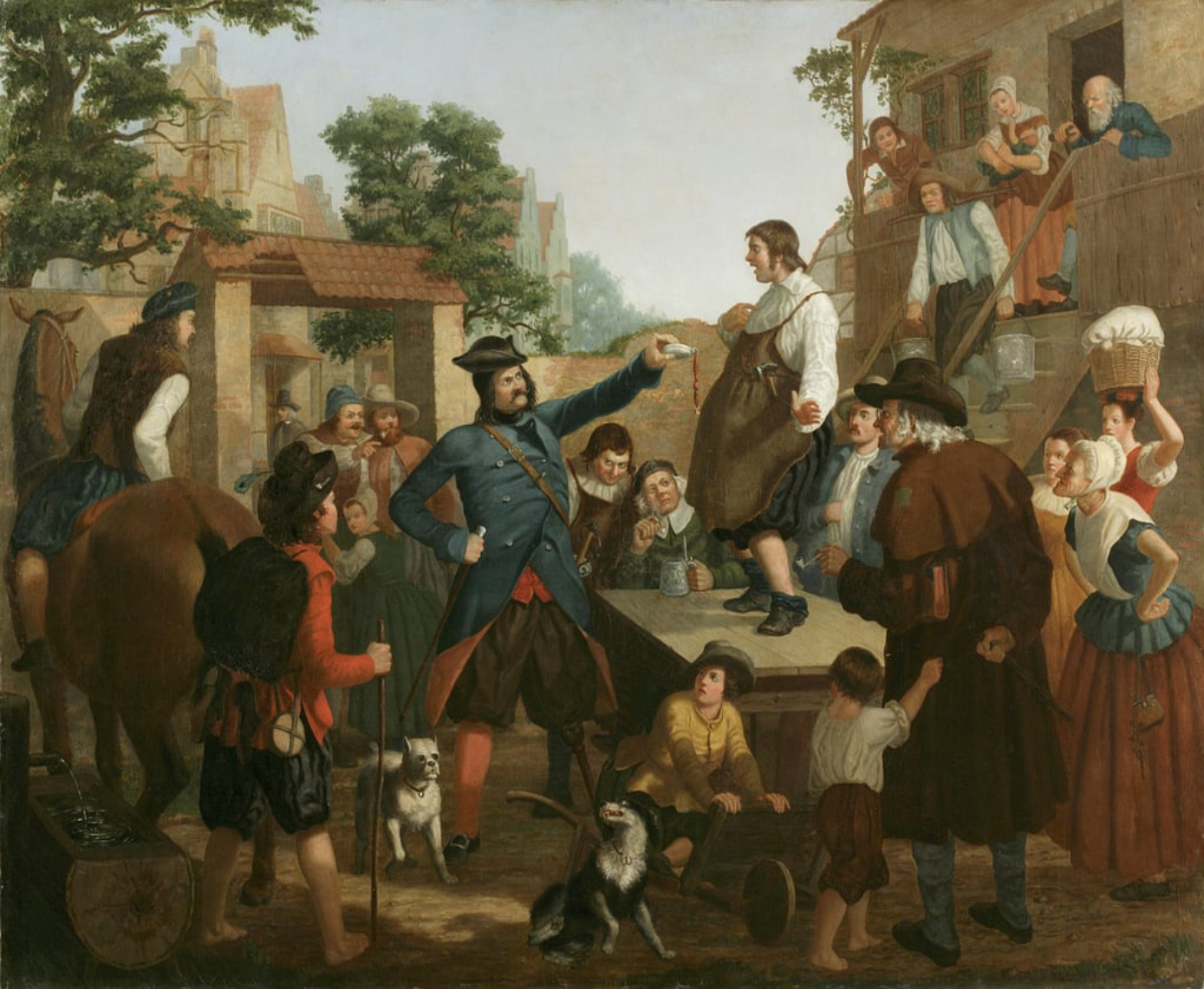
Peter Stuyvesant and the Cobbler, c1850
