= Wolfgang Treu (politician) =

Austrian politician

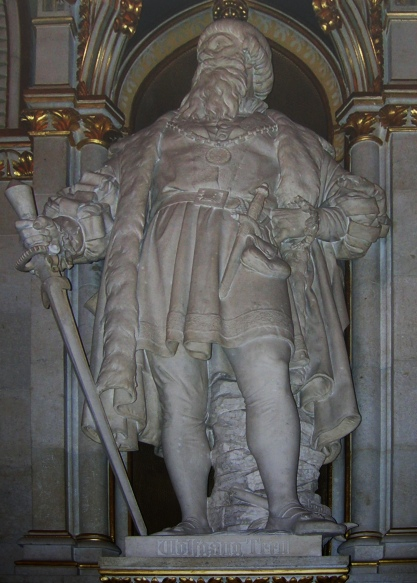
A statue of Wolfgang Treu in a hall within the Vienna City Hall

Wolfgang Treu (died 1540, Vienna) was the mayor of Vienna from 1528 to 1530, 1532 to 1533 and 1536 to 1537. The Siege of Vienna occurred during his first term in office.
