= Lambert Krahe =

German painter

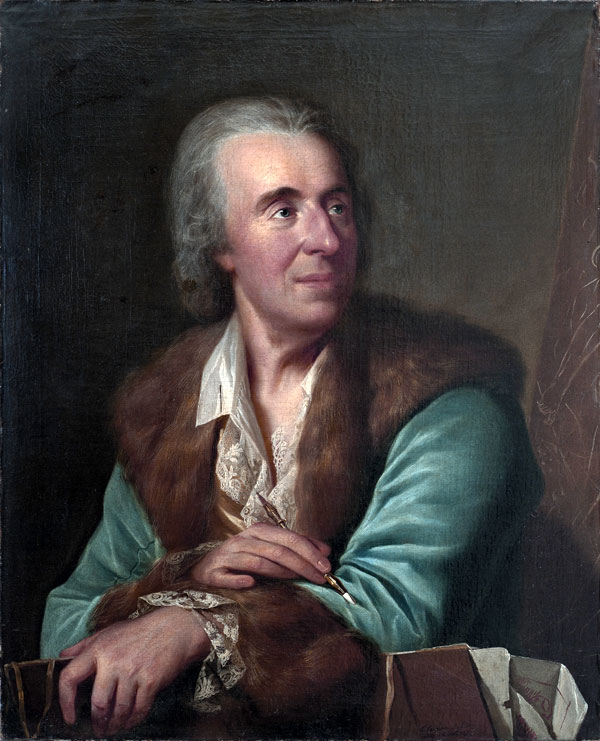
- Lambert Krahe (Portrait by Erik Pauelsen, 1781)
- Born: 15 March 1712; Düsseldorf, Duchy of Berg
- Died: 2 November 1790 (aged 78); Düsseldorf, Duchy of Berg
- Known for: Painting

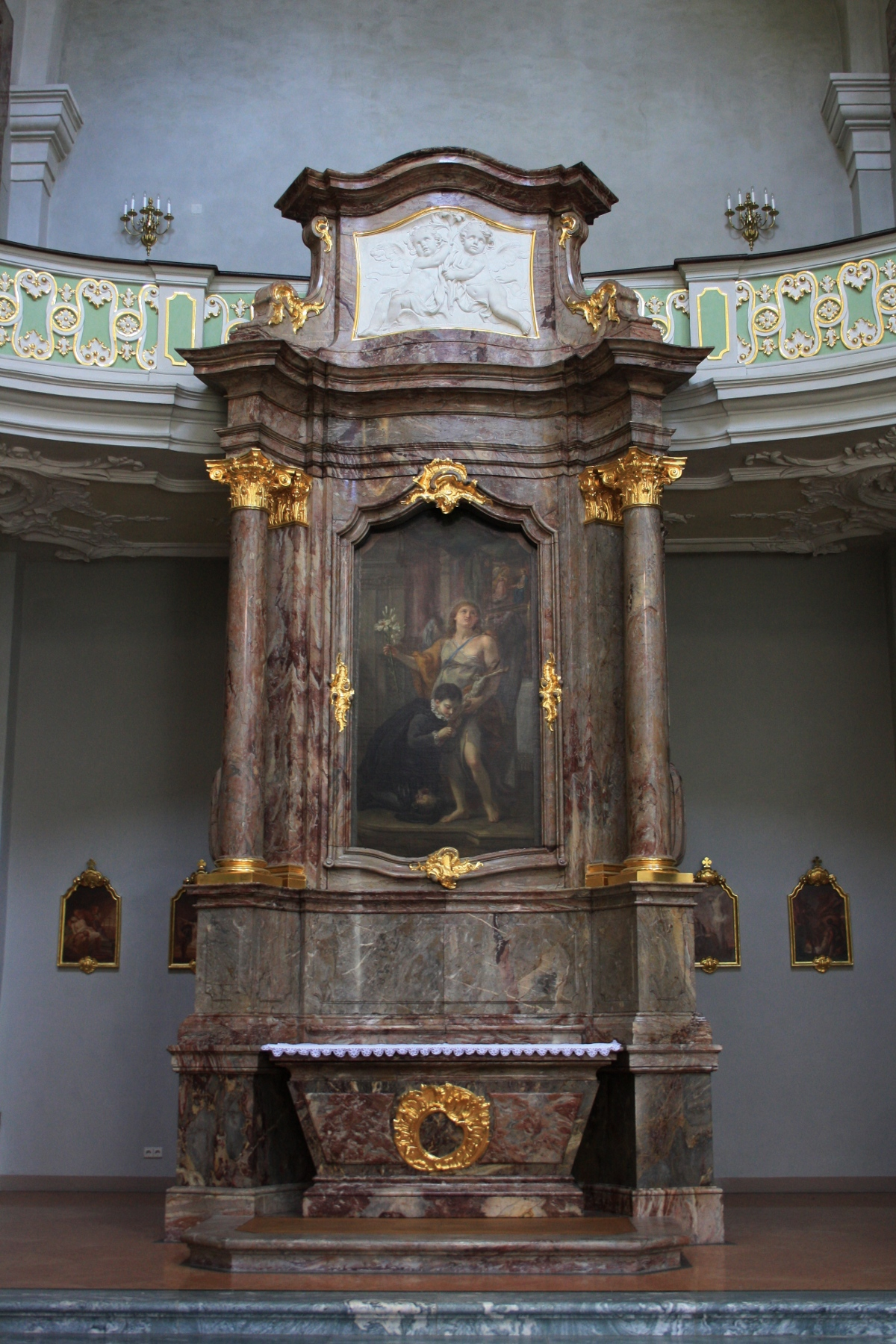
Painting in the Jesuit Church, Mannheim

Wilhelm Lambert Krahe (15 March 1712 – 2 November 1790) was a German history painter and art collector.

== Life ==
He was born in Düsseldorf as the son of a government clerk. Nothing is known of his early education. He found a patron in Ferdinand von Plettenberg, who took Krahe along when he was appointed Imperial Envoy to the Papal Court in 1736. When Plettenberg died suddenly in 1737, Krahe found support from the German Jesuits. He is also said to have worked in the studios of Marco Benefial and Pierre Subleyras. His patrons at that time included Cardinal Alessandro Albani and Johann Joachim Winckelmann.

In 1749, upon the recommendation of Silvio Valenti Gonzaga, the Cardinal Secretary of State, he was pensioned to Charles Theodore, Elector of Bavaria, on whose behalf he painted altarpieces for the Jesuit Church in Mannheim. In 1756, he became head of the Düsseldorf Art Gallery. Later, the Elector appointed him to oversee the creation of new galleries in Mannheim and Munich. In 1761, he was commissioned to paint ceilings in the library and ballrooms at Schloss Benrath.

He started an art school in 1762. Eleven years later, his school was designated the "Electorate of the Palatinate Painting, Sculpture and Architecture Academy" (later, the Kunstakademie Düsseldorf) and Krahe became its first director. In his last years, an eye ailment prevented him from painting. He died in 1790 in Düsseldorf.

The Classical architect Peter Joseph Krahe was his son. Moritz Kellerhoven was one of his best-known students.

== Art collection ==
Although Krahe was a popular painter during his lifetime, his art collection constitutes his most important achievement. Begun when he was in Rome, and expanded during travels throughout Germany, Holland and France, it came to include 332 paintings and oil sketches, as well as thousands of drawings and prints from the 15th to 18th centuries. It remains one of the world's most important collections of Italian Baroque drawings.

In 1778, the collection was purchased by the Duchy of Berg for use at the academy. Since 1932, most of it has been on permanent loan from the academy to the Museum Kunstpalast in Düsseldorf. Smaller selections may be seen at the Wallraf-Richartz Museum in Cologne and the Louvre.

The centerpiece of the collection consists of graphic works by Raphael, Michelangelo and Paolo Veronese, with larger works by Gian Lorenzo Bernini, Pietro da Cortona and Giuseppe Passeri. The collection also includes woodcuts by Albrecht Dürer, engravings by Martin Schongauer and etchings by Rembrandt.
