= Kunstakademie Düsseldorf =

Art school in Düsseldorf, Germany

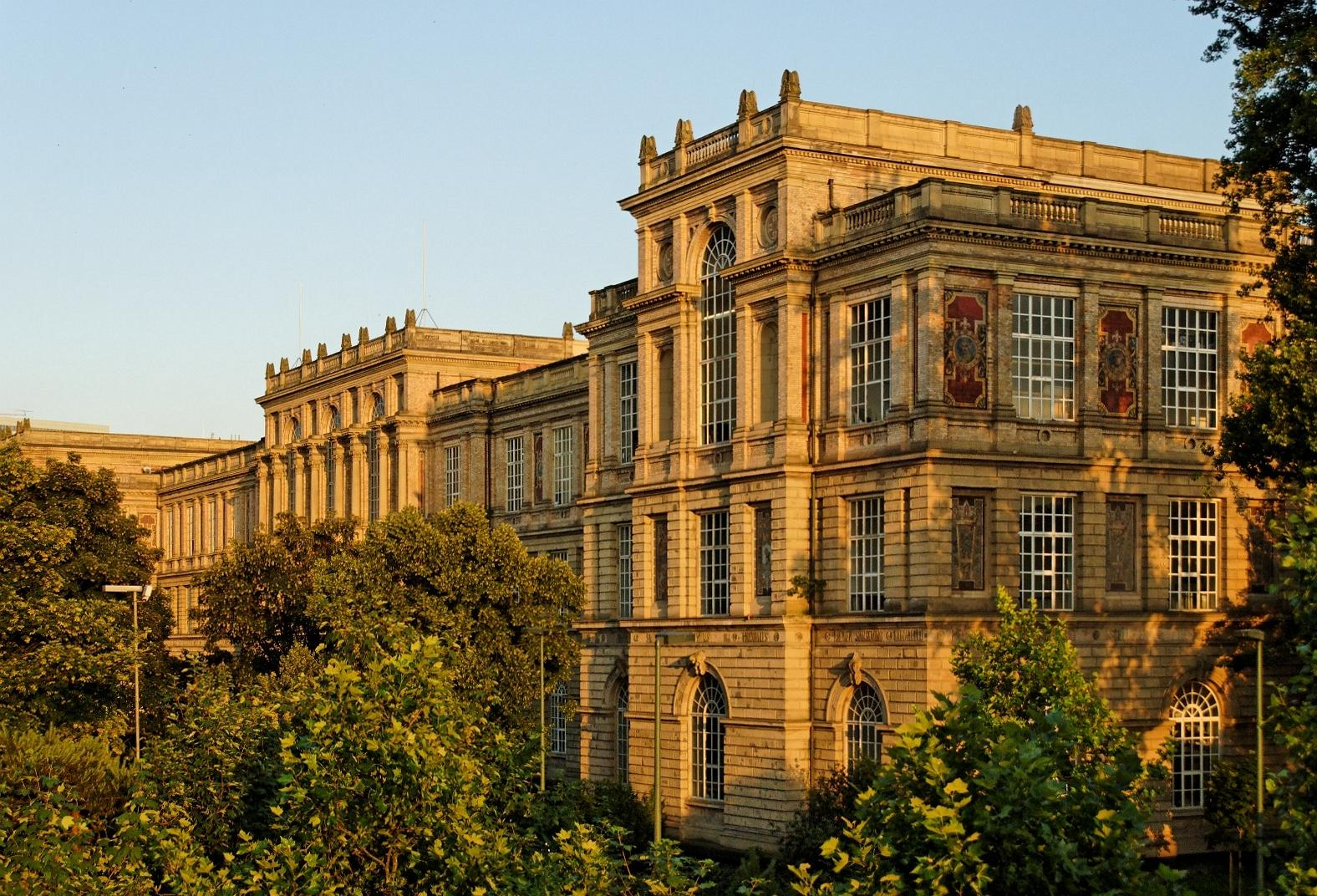
- Kunstakademie Düsseldorf
- Established: 1762; 264 years ago
- Founder: Lambert Krahe
- Rector: Donatella Fioretti
- Location: Düsseldorf, North Rhine-Westphalia, Germany; 51°13′50″N 6°46′25″E
- Website: www.kunstakademie-duesseldorf.de

The Kunstakademie Düsseldorf is the academy of fine arts of the state of North Rhine Westphalia at the city of Düsseldorf, Germany. Notable artists who studied or taught at the academy include Joseph Beuys, Gerhard Richter, Blinky Palermo, Magdalena Jetelová, Gotthard Graubner, Nam June Paik, Nan Hoover, Katharina Fritsch, Tony Cragg, Ruth Rogers-Altmann, Sigmar Polke, Anselm Kiefer, Rosemarie Trockel, Thomas Schütte, Katharina Grosse, Michael Krebber and photographers Thomas Ruff, Thomas Demand, Christopher Williams, Thomas Struth, Andreas Gursky and Candida Höfer. In the stairway of its main entrance are engraved the Words: "Für unsere Studenten nur das Beste" ("For our Students only the Best").

== Early history ==
The school was founded by Lambert Krahe in 1762 as a school of drawing. The first female professor, Catharina Treu, was appointed in 1766. In 1773, it became the "Kurfürstlich-Pfälzische Academie der Maler, Bildhauer- und Baukunst" (Academy of Painting, Sculpture and Architecture of the Electorate of the Palatinate). During the Napoleonic Wars, the count palatine's art collection was inherited by the Wittelsbach family and moved to Munich, prompting the Prussian government—who had annexed the Düsseldorf region after Napoleon had surrendered—to change it into a Royal Arts Academy in Düsseldorf, in 1819.

In the 1850s, the Kunstakademie Düsseldorf became internationally renowned, with many students coming from Scandinavia, Russia and the United States to learn, among other things, the genre and landscape painting associated with the Düsseldorf school.

== Photography ==
Bernd Becher was professor from 1976 to 1998. In 1976, Becher founded a photography class at the Kunstakademie Düsseldorf. Students of Bernd and Hilla Becher there included Laurenz Berges, Elger Esser, Bernhard Fuchs, Andreas Gursky, Candida Höfer, Axel Hütte, Simone Nieweg, Tata Ronkholz, Thomas Ruff, Jörg Sasse, Josef Schulz, Thomas Struth, Petra Wunderlich. In the 2010 catalogue Der Rote Bulli. Stephen Shore und die Neue Düsseldorfer Fotografie is a list of all the students

In November 2021 the academy cooperated with the City of Düsseldorf, Die Photographische Sammlung/SK Stiftung Kultur (Cologne) and the non-profit DFI e. V. (Verein zur Gründung und Förderung eines Deutschen Fotoinstituts e. V.) to support plans to establish the Deutsches Fotoinstitut in Düsseldorf.

== Directors ==
- 1773–1789 Lambert Krahe
- 1789–1806 Johann Peter von Langer
- 1819–1824 Peter von Cornelius
- 1826–1859 Friedrich Wilhelm von Schadow
- 1859–1867 Eduard Julius Friedrich Bendemann
- 1867–1870: Hermann Altgelt
- 1868–1895: Hermann Wislicenus
- 1895–1908 Johann Peter Theodor Janssen
- 1908–1924 Fritz Roeber
- 1924–1933 Walter Kaesbach
- 1933–1937 Peter Grund
- 1937–1945 Emil Fahrenkamp
- 1945–1946 Ewald Mataré
- 1946–1949 Werner Heuser
- 1949–1954 Heinrich Kamps
- 1956–1965 Hans Schwippert
- 1965–1972 Eduard Trier
- 1972–1981 Norbert Kricke
- 1981–1988 Irmin Kamp
- 1988–2009 Markus Lüpertz
- 2009–2013 Tony Cragg
- 2013–2017 Rita McBride
- 2017–2022: Karl-Heinz Petzinka
- Since April 2023: Donatella Fioretti

== Notable professors and students ==
A

- Tomma Abts (2010–present Professor)
- Aljoscha (Student)
- Andreas Achenbach (1827–1834 Student)
- Oswald Achenbach (1835–1841 Student; 1863–1872 Professor)
- Sonja Alhäuser (1989–1994 Student)
- Peter Angermann (1968–1973)
- Karl Aegerter (1888–1969)
- Ernst Aufseeser (1912–1933 Professor)

B

- Hermann Heinrich Becker (1817–1885), student
- Bernd Becher (1976–1996 Professor)
- Hilla Becher, born Wobeser (1958–1961 Student)
- Joseph Beuys (1947–1952 Student, 1961–1972 Professor (kicked out), Visiting, 1980–85)
- Edward Beyer (1820–1865)
- Albert Bierstadt (1830–1902 Student)
- Paul Bindel (1930–1960 Professor of painting)
- Wolfgang Binding (1959–1963 Student)
- Anna and Bernhard Blume (1960–1965 Students)
- Laurenz Berges (1992–1997 Student)
- Arnold Böcklin (1827–1901 Student)
- Christian Ludwig Bokelmann (1844–1894 Student)
- Gottfried Brockmann (1926–1932 Student, 1933 Professor)
- Christoph Büchel (1992–1997 Student)
- Maria Buras (1980–1985 Assistant Professor)
- Michael Buthe (1944–1994 Professor)

C

- Max Clarenbach (1894–1901 Student, 1917–1945 Professor)
- Gregory Coates (1985–1987 Student)
- Otto Coester (1938–1967 Professor)
- Tony Cragg (1979–1988 Assistant Professor, 1988–2001 Professor, 2010 Director)
- Siegfried Cremer (1977–1994 Professor of Drawing Technique)
- Abraham David Christian (1976–1978 Lecturer)
- Rolf Crummenauer (1952–1967 Lecturer, 1967–1990 Professor)

D

- Richard Deacon (2009-2015 Professor)
- Thomas Demand (Student)
- Eugen Denzel (Student)
- August Deusser (1890–1897 Student under Peter Janssen d.Ä., 1917 Professor)
- Jan Dibbets (1984–2004 Professor)
- Thea Djordjadze (1994–2001 Student)
- Peter Doig (2005–present Professor)
- Max Dudler (2004–present Professor and Vice Dean)
- Eugen Dücker (1872–1916 Professor)
- Udo Dziersk (1983–1988 Student, 2002–present Professor)

E

- Adam Eberle (1819–1825 Student under Peter von Cornelius)
- Tatiana Echeverri Fernandez (1997 – 2001 Student)
- Alfred Eckhardt (1947–1952 Student, 1961–1977 Professor of Drawing Technique)
- Franz Eggenschwiler (1981–1995 Professor)
- John Whetton Ehninger (c. 1848–1849) – (Student)
- Joseph Enseling (1938–1952 Professor)
- Elger Esser (1991–1997 Student under Bernd Becher)

F

- Helmut Federle (1999–2007 Professor)
- Anselm Feuerbach (1845–1848 Student)
- Eduard Frederich (1836–1843 Student)
- Katharina Fritsch (1977–1984 Student, 2010 present Professor of Sculpture)

G

- Rupprecht Geiger (1965–1976 Professor)
- Isa Genzken (Student)
- Emily Gernild (Student)
- Karl Otto Götz (1959–1979 Professor)
- Bruno Goller (1949–1964 Professor)
- Eugen Gomringer (1977–1990 Professor)
- Kuno Gonschior (1957–1961 Student)
- Paul Good (1983–2008 Professor for Philosophy)
- Martin Gostner (2004– Professor)
- Günter Grass (1948–1952 Student)
- Gotthard Graubner (1954–1959 Student, 1976–1992 Professor)
- Hedwig Greve (1868–1875 Student)
- Michael Growe (1983–1989 Student, master-student of Gotthard Graubner)
- Durs Grünbein (2005– Professor of Poetry)
- Thomas Grünfeld (2004– Professor of Sculpture)
- Andreas Gursky (1981–1987 Student, master-student of Bernd Becher, since 2009 Professor)

H

- Johann Peter Hasenclever (1827–1829 Student)
- Erwin Heerich (1958–1965 Student, 1969–1988 Professor)
- Sophie von Hellermann (Student)
- Georg Herold (Professor for sculpture)
- Anatol Herzfeld (Student, 1964–1972)
- Werner Heuser (1926–1938 Professor for drawing, 1946–1949 Director)
- Robert Alexander Hillingford (Student)
- Hans Hollein (1967–1965 Professor)
- Candida Höfer (1973–1982 Student)
- Ottmar Hörl (1979–1981 Student, 2005– President Akademie Nuremberg)
- Bernhard Hoetger (1874–1949 Student)
- Oskar Hoffmann (Student, 1872–1877)
- Hans Hollein (1967–1976 Professor)
- Nan Hoover (1986–1996 Professor)
- Julius Hübner (1826–1828 Student)
- Alfonso Hüppi (1974–1999 Professor of painting)
- Johannes Hüppi (1984 bis 1990 master-student of Dieter Krieg)
- Axel Hütte (1973–1981 Student)
- Gerhard Hoehme (1960–1984 Professor)

I

- Jörg Immendorff (1963–1969 Student, 1996–2007 Professor)
- Christoph Ingenhoven (1980–1981 student at Hans Hollein)

J

- Georg Jabin (1850–1855 Student at Johann Wilhelm Schirmer)
- Renata Jaworska (2000 – 2006 Master Student at Jörg Immendorff)
- Johann Peter Theodor Janssen (1858–1864 Student, 1877– Professor)
- Peter Tamme Weyert Janssen (1923–1925 Student)
- Rudolf Jordan (1833–1840 Master Class)
- Julius Paul Junghanns (1904–1945 Professor of painting)
- Helmut Jürgens (1924–1926, student)

K

- Stanislaus von Kalckreuth (1846–1849 Student)
- Arthur Kampf (1879–1891 Student and Professor)
- Ernst Kasper (Architekt, 1971–2000 Professor for Architecture)
- William Keith (1869–1870 Student)
- Hubert Kiecol (since 1993 Professor for Integration Fine Arts and Architecture)
- Anselm Kiefer (early 1970s, Student)
- Luise Kimme (1976–2002 Professor)
- Konrad Klapheck (1954–1956 student, 1979 professor)
- Ludwig Knaus (1845–1852 Student)
- Karl Kneidl (1974–2008 Professor of stage design)
- Imi Knoebel (1964–1971 Student at Joseph Beuys)
- Paul Klee (1931–1933 Professor)
- Georg Klusemann (1964–1968 Student)
- Louis Kolitz (Academy Professor Kassel)
- Klaus Köhler-Achenbach (Professor)
- Heinrich Christoph Kolbe (dates unknown, Student; 1822–1832 Professor)
- Attila Kotányi
- Walter Köngeter (1952–1967 Professor of Constructive Arts)
- Kasper König (1985 Professor at the Institute art and the public)
- Ralf König (1981–1986 Student)
- Dieter Krieg (1978–2002 Professor of Painting)
- Jannis Kounellis (1993–2001 Professor for Sculpture)
- Wilhelm Kreis, 1920–1926 Professor of Architecture)
- Norbert Kricke (Professor, Director)
- Dieter Krieg (1978–2002 Professor of painting)
- Livia Kubach (1987–1994 Student of Tony Cragg, 1995 Master Student of Günther UeckerRother Renaissance – We Are Reimagining

L

- Ants Laikmaa (1896–1899 Student)
- Rainer Maria Latzke (1972–1976 Student of G.Richter, 1976 Master Student, 2008 Professor)
- Johann Peter von Langer (Student at Krahn, 1784 Professor, 1789–1806 Director)
- Wilhelm Lehmbruck (1902–1906 Student)
- Emanuel Leutze (1840–1842 Student)

M

- August Macke (1904–1909 Student)
- Josef Mages (1938–1961 Professor of Sculpture)
- Rita McBride (2003–present Professor, 2013–2017 Director)
- Lucy McKenzie, Professor
- Patrick Meagher (artist), student
- Christian Megert ((1976–2002 Professor for Integration Fine Arts and Architektur)
- Georg Meistermann (1928–1933 Student, 1955–1959 Professor)
- Carlo Mense (1906–1908 Student at Peter Janssen)
- Gerhard Merz (1991–2004 Professor)
- Orlando Mohorovic (1970–1974 master-student of Joseph Beuys)
- John Morgan (2016–present Professor of Typography)
- Adolf Mosengel (1854–1857, student)
- Heinrich Mücke (1844–1848 lectureship, 1848–1867 Professor for painting)
- Christoph Mügge (Student 2006-2013)
- Andreas Müller (1856– Professor)
- Norbert Müller-Everling, 1973–1979 Student at Erwin Heerich)

N

- Yoshitomo Nara (1988–1993 Student)
- Heinrich Nauen (1921–1937 Professor)
- Thomas Neumann (1997–2004 Student)
- Simone Nieweg (1984-1990 Student)

O

- Albert Oehlen (2000– Professor)
- Markus Oehlen (1976–1982 Student)
- Carl Oesterley junior (1857– Student)
- Laurids Ortner (1987– Professor)
- David Ostrowski (2004–2009 Student)
- Teo Otto (1959–1968 Professor of stage design)

P

- Nam June Paik (1979–1996 Professor of Video Art)
- Blinky Palermo (1962–1967 master-student of Joseph Beuys)
- Otto Pankok (1947–1958 Professor)
- Jürgen Partenheimer (1985 visiting Professor)
- A. R. Penck (1988–2003 Professor)
- Heinrich Ludwig Philippi (1857–1860 Student)
- Alois Plum (1955–1957 Student)
- Sigmar Polke (1961–1967 Student)

R

- Willy Reetz (1920–1924 Student)
- Gerhard Richter (1961–1963 Student, 1971–1993 Professor)
- Ivo Ringe (1972–1977 Student), master-student of Professor Rolf Sackenheim
- Klaus Rinke (1974–2004 Professor)
- Römer + Römer (Torsten and Nina Römer, master students of A. R. Penck)
- Ulrike Rosenbach (1964–1970 Student)
- Hannes Rosenow (c.1946–1948 Student)
- Rudolph von Ripper (c.1920 Student)
- Rissa (1959 Student, 1969–1975 and 2004–2007 Lecturer, 1975–2003 Professor for painting)
- Thomas Ruff (Student, Professor)

S

- Rolf Sackenheim (1963–1985 Professor)
- Jörg Sasse (1982–1988 Student, master-student of Bernd Becher)
- Adolf Schill (1880–1911 Professor of decoration and ornamentation)
- Johann Wilhelm Schirmer (1826 Student, 1834 assistant teacher, 1839–1854 Professor for Landscape Painting, first Director of Karlsruher Kunstschule)
- Christoph Schlingensief (1986 Lecturer)
- Johann Heinrich Schmidt Professor of Art History)
- Jürgen Schmitt (1970–1976 Student, master-student)
- Bruno Schmitz (1874–1878 Student)
- Michael Schmitz-Aufterbeck (Lecturer in Theatre Studies)
- Gregor Schneider, 1990–1994 Student)
- Andreas Schulze, (since 2008 Professor)
- Felix Schramm
- Rudolf Schwarz (1953–1961 Professor)
- Marcus Schwier (1993–1998 Student)
- HA Schult (1958–1961 Student)
- Thomas Schütte (1973–1981 Student)
- Rudolf Schwarz, 1953–1961 Professor
- Fritz Schwegler (1973–1975 Assistant Professor, 1975–2001 Professor)
- Peter Schwickerath (1966–1968 Student)
- Hans Schwippert (1959–1965 Professor and Director)
- Adolf Seel (1844–1850 Student)
- Dirk Skreber (1982–1988 Student)
- Karl Ferdinand Sohn (1826 Student, 1859–1863 Professor)
- Wilhelm Sohn (1867 Professor)
- Willy Spatz (Student, 1897–1926 Professor for painting)
- Werner Spies (1975–2002 Professor of the history of arts)
- Pia Stadtbäumer (1981–1988 Student)
- David D. Stern (1980–1982 Student)
- Thomas Struth (1973–1978 Student)
- Zoltan Székessy (1952–1964 Professor)

T

- Adolph Tidemand (1837–1841 Student)
- André Thomkins (1971–1973 Professor)
- Johan Thorn Prikker (1923–1926 Professor of monumental painting)
- Myriam Thyes (1986–1992 student of Rissa and Nan Hoover)
- Catharina Treu (1766- Professor)
- Rosemarie Trockel (1998–present Professor)

U

- Günther Uecker (1953–1957 Student, 1976–1995 Professor)
- Oswald Mathias Ungers

V

- Jana Vizjak (1991–1993 Student)
- Heinrich Vogeler (1890–1895 Student)
- Max Volkhart (1848–1924 Student)
- Wolf Vostell (1955–1958 Student)
- Nathalie de Vries (2013–Present Professor of Constructive Arts)

W

- Rebecca Warren (2014–present Professor)
- Marie Wiegmann (born Hancke, about 1843 Student)
- Rudolf Wiegmann (1838–1865 Professor for Architecture and perspective)
- Oswald Wiener (1992–2004 Professor for Aesthetics)
- Christopher Williams (since 2007 Professor for Photography)
- Karl Ferdinand Wimar (c. 1851 Student)
- Karl Wimmenauer (in the 1960s Professor for Architecture)

Z

- Herbert Zangs, 1945–1949 Student
