= Boros Collection =

Private collection of contemporary art

The Boros Collection is a private collection of contemporary art by Karen and Christian Boros, which has been on display since 2008 in the Reichsbahnbunker Friedrichstraße in Berlin, Germany. The collection comprises artworks in the mediums of sculpture, photography and painting by international contemporary artists. The works are installed on five floors of the bunker, which the architect Jens Casper transformed into a compendium of individual rooms that interconnect on multiple floors. While some rooms were transformed into classic white cube spaces, others still bare traces of the bunker's lineage when it was used as a prison, storage facility and techno club. Each exhibition in the bunker additionally includes site-specific works that refer to and interact with the various interior spaces and their history.

The collection is accessible to the public from Thursdays through Sundays only in the form of guided tours via prior application on the website of the collection.

The Boros Foundation is directed by Raoul Zoellner.

The fifth presentation of the collection, on view since May 2026, brings together newly acquired works with works from the early 2000s.

== Boros Collection/ Bunker Berlin #1 (2008–2012) ==
- Michael Beutler
- John Bock
- Olafur Eliasson
- Elmgreen und Dragset
- Kitty Kraus
- Robert Kusmirowski
- Mark Leckey
- Manuela Leinhoß
- Sarah Lucas
- Kris Martin
- Henrik Olesen
- Manfred Pernice
- Daniel Pflumm
- Tobias Rehberger
- Anselm Reyle
- Bojan Sarcevic
- Santiago Sierra
- Florian Slotawa
- Monika Sosnowska
- Katja Strunz
- Rirkrit Tiravanija

The first exhibition was visited by over 120,000 guests.

== Boros Collection/ Bunker Berlin #2 (2012–2016) ==
- Ai Weiwei
- Awst & Walther
- Dirk Bell
- Cosima von Bonin
- Marieta Chirulescu
- Thea Djordjadze
- Olafur Eliasson
- Alicja Kwade
- Klara Lidén
- Florian Meisenberg
- Roman Ondák
- Mandla Reuter
- Stephen G. Rhodes
- Thomas Ruff
- Michael Sailstorfer
- Tomás Saraceno
- Thomas Scheibitz
- Wolfgang Tillmans
- Rirkrit Tiravanija
- Danh Võ
- Cerith Wyn Evans
- Thomas Zipp

The second exhibition was visited by over 200,000 guests.

== Boros Collection/ Bunker Berlin #3 (2017-2022) ==
- Martin Boyce
- Andreas Eriksson
- Guan Xiao
- He Xiangyu
- Uwe Henneken
- Yngve Holen
- Sergej Jensen
- Daniel Josefsohn
- Friedrich Kunath
- Michel Majerus
- Fabian Marti
- Kris Martin
- Justin Matherly
- Paulo Nazareth
- Katja Novitskova
- Peter Piller
- Pamela Rosenkranz
- Avery Singer
- Johannes Wohnseifer

The third exhibition was visited by over 220,000 guests.

== Boros Collection/ Bunker Berlin #4 (2022-2026) ==
- Jean-Marie Appriou
- Julian Charrière
- Eliza Douglas
- Thomas Eggerer
- Louis Fratino
- Cyprien Gaillard
- Ximena Garrido-Lecca
- Yngve Holen
- Klára Hosnedlová
- Anne Imhof
- Alicja Kwade
- Victor Man
- Kris Martin
- Nick Mauss
- Jonathan Monk
- Adrian Morris
- Paulo Nazareth
- Berenice Olmedo
- Amalia Pica
- Bunny Rogers
- Michael Sailstorfer
- Wilhelm Sasnal
- Pieter Schoolwerth
- Anna Uddenberg
- Julius von Bismarck
- Eric Wesley
- He Xiangyu

The fourth exhibition was visited by over 244.000 guests.

== Boros Collection/ Bunker Berlin #5 (2026-present) ==
- Tomma Abts
- Lorenzo Amos
- Ed Atkins
- Oliver Bak
- Adriano Costa
- Grant Falardeau
- Louis Fratino
- Cyprien Gaillard
- Salim Green
- Lukas Heerich
- Samuel Hindolo
- Klára Hosnedlová
- Brook Hsu
- Kitty Kraus
- Mire Lee
- Benjamin Lallier
- Klara Lidén
- Conny Maier
- Kresiah Mukwazhi
- Jill Mulleady
- Jonathan Okoronkwo
- Silke Otto-Knapp
- Rim Park
- Jeremy Shaw
- Pol Taburet
- Sung Tieu
- Paloma Varga Weisz
