= Reichsbahnbunker Friedrichstraße =

Air-raid shelter

Coordinates: 52°31′24″N 13°23′2″E

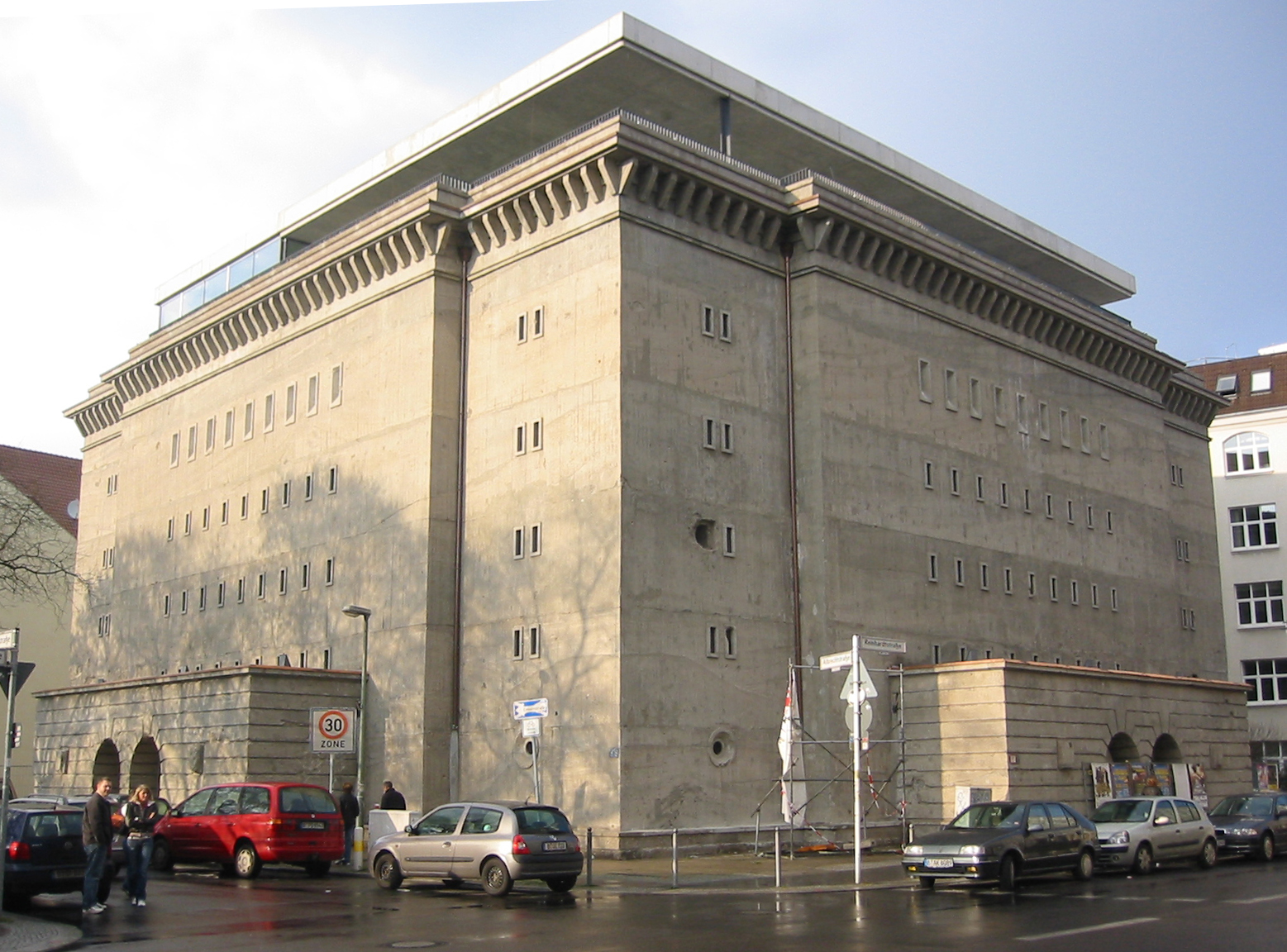
Der Bunker

Location of the Bunker in Berlin

The Reichsbahnbunker Friedrichstraße in Berlin-Mitte, Germany, is a listed air-raid shelter that was constructed in 1943 and is now used as an art gallery and private apartment.

== History and description ==
Originally based on plans of the architect Karl Bonatz, it was constructed in 1943 by Nazi Germany to shelter up to 3,000 Reichsbahn train passengers. The square building has an area of 1,000 square metres (11,000 sq ft) and is 18 metres (59 ft) high; its walls are up to 3 metres (9.8 ft) thick. There are 120 rooms on five floors.

In 1945 the MGB, a former Soviet intelligence and counterintelligence agency, one of the forerunners of the KGB, established one of many command centers in this building. Buildings next to the bunker, formerly used as secret prisons for political prisoners by the Gestapo, a brutal Secret State Police of the Nazis, have also been taken under MGB control and continued to be used as such as.

From 1949, it was used to store textiles and from 1957, as storage for dry and tropical fruit, which is why the building was known as the Banana Bunker among East Berliners.

In the summer of 1992, it was turned into a hardcore techno and fetish club called "Bunker". Gabba, hard trance, house and breakbeat parties were held on four floors. After a police raid in 1995 the events became more irregular. A further raid in 1996 placed severe building restrictions on the tenants, causing the club to close. The annual Fuckparade began in part to protest the closing of the club; for several years, and again in 2026, the demonstrations would start at the Bunker.

In 2001, real estate investor Nippon Development Corporation GmbH bought the building from the government. In 2002, it was the venue of the Berlin art festival "Insideout".

=== Boros Collection ===
Christian Boros purchased the bunker for his private collection of contemporary art in 2003. He subsequently had architects Jens Casper and Petra Petersson convert the building into a 32,000-square-foot (3,000 m^{2}) exhibition space and build a 4,800-square-foot (450 m^{2}) glass-walled penthouse on the roof. The renovation work was finished in 2007. The interior design of the penthouse was featured in a 2017 Financial Times article.

The first exhibition of the permanent collection opened in 2008, featuring selected sculptures, installations, and light and performance works by, among others, Olafur Eliasson, Elmgreen and Dragset, Robert Kusmirowski, Sarah Lucas, Tobias Rehberger, Anselm Reyle, Monika Sosnowska, Santiago Sierra, and Rirkrit Tiravanija. That show opened in 2008 and attracted 120,000 visitors during its nearly four-year run.

Opened in 2012, "Sammlung Boros #2," features 130 works by 23 artists, including Ai Weiwei, Thea Djordjadze, Klara Liden, Wolfgang Tillmans, Cerith Wyn Evans.

This was replaced in 2018 by "Boros Collection / Bunker #3", which includes works from the artists Martin Boyce, Andreas Eriksson, Guan Xiao, He Xiangyu, Uwe Henneken, Yngve Holen, Sergej Jensen, Daniel Josefsohn, Friedrich Kunath, Michel Majerus, Fabian Marti, Kris Martin, Justin Matherly, Paulo Nazareth, Peter Piller, Katja Novitskova, Pamela Rosenkranz, Avery Singer, Johannes Wohnseifer.

== See also ==
- List of electronic dance music venues
