= Museum of Contemporary Art in Kraków =

Art gallery in Kraków, Poland

Coordinates: 50.025°N 19.574°E

MOCAK
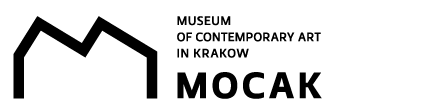

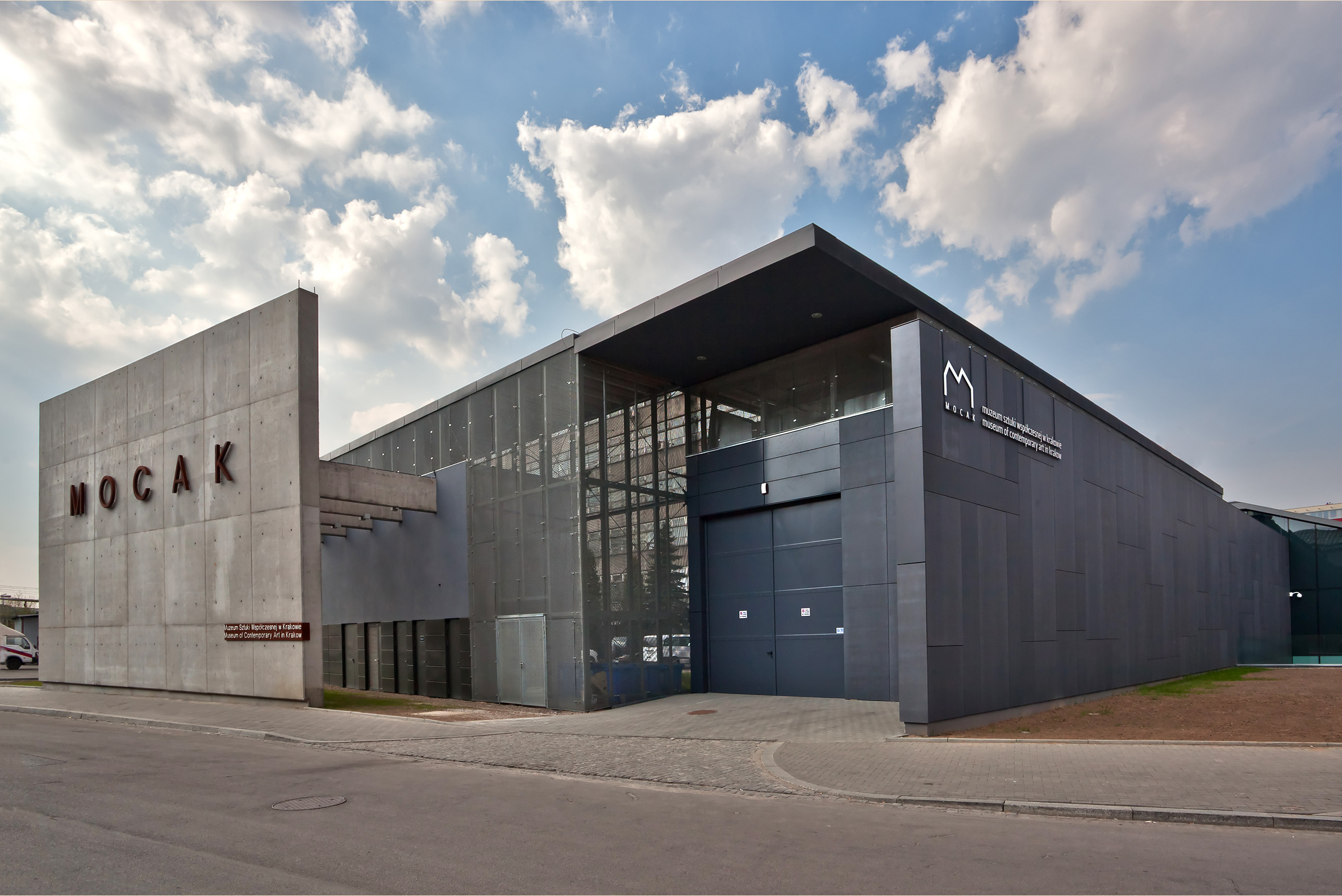
- Established: 1 February 2010
- Location: Kraków, Poland
- Type: Museum of Contemporary Art
- Director: Grzegorz Kuźma (acting)
- Website: en.mocak.pl

Interior of the museum

The Museum of Contemporary Art in Kraków (MOCAK) (Polish: Muzeum Sztuki Współczesnej w Krakowie) is a contemporary art gallery in Kraków, Poland that opened on 19 May 2011. Situated 3 kilometres from the centre of the city, on a demolished part of the factory of Oskar Schindler, the aim of the gallery is to present and support contemporary art and artists, in particular art from the last two decades.

The Museum includes a library, bookshop, café and contemporary art conservation laboratory.

The museum houses works by such artists as AES+F, Krzysztof Wodiczko, Beat Streuli, Ragnar Kjartansson, Robert Kuśmirowski, Tomasz Bajer, Krištof Kintera, Maria Stangret, and Edward Dwurnik. The permanent exhibition is located on the first floor of the building and temporary exhibitions are displayed on the second floor.

The building of the museum was designed by Claudio Nardi and it was inspired by neomodern architecture. The exhibition area is divided into several sections and covers the area of 4,000 square metres while the area of the whole museum covers 10,000 square metres. The cost of the museum is estimated at 70 million PLN (ca. €16 million) and its construction was co-financed from the European Union funds.

Masza Potocka was museum's director from its inception in 2010 until 2024; while Delfina Jałowik worked as museum's Head of the Art Department. Potocka was dismissed due to allegations of workplace bullying that were confirmed by the court. Potocka's successor Adam Budak was dismissed from directorial office in May 2026, due to allegations of workplace bullying. Grzegorz Kuźma has been an acting director since.
