= Delfina Jałowik =

Art curator and historian

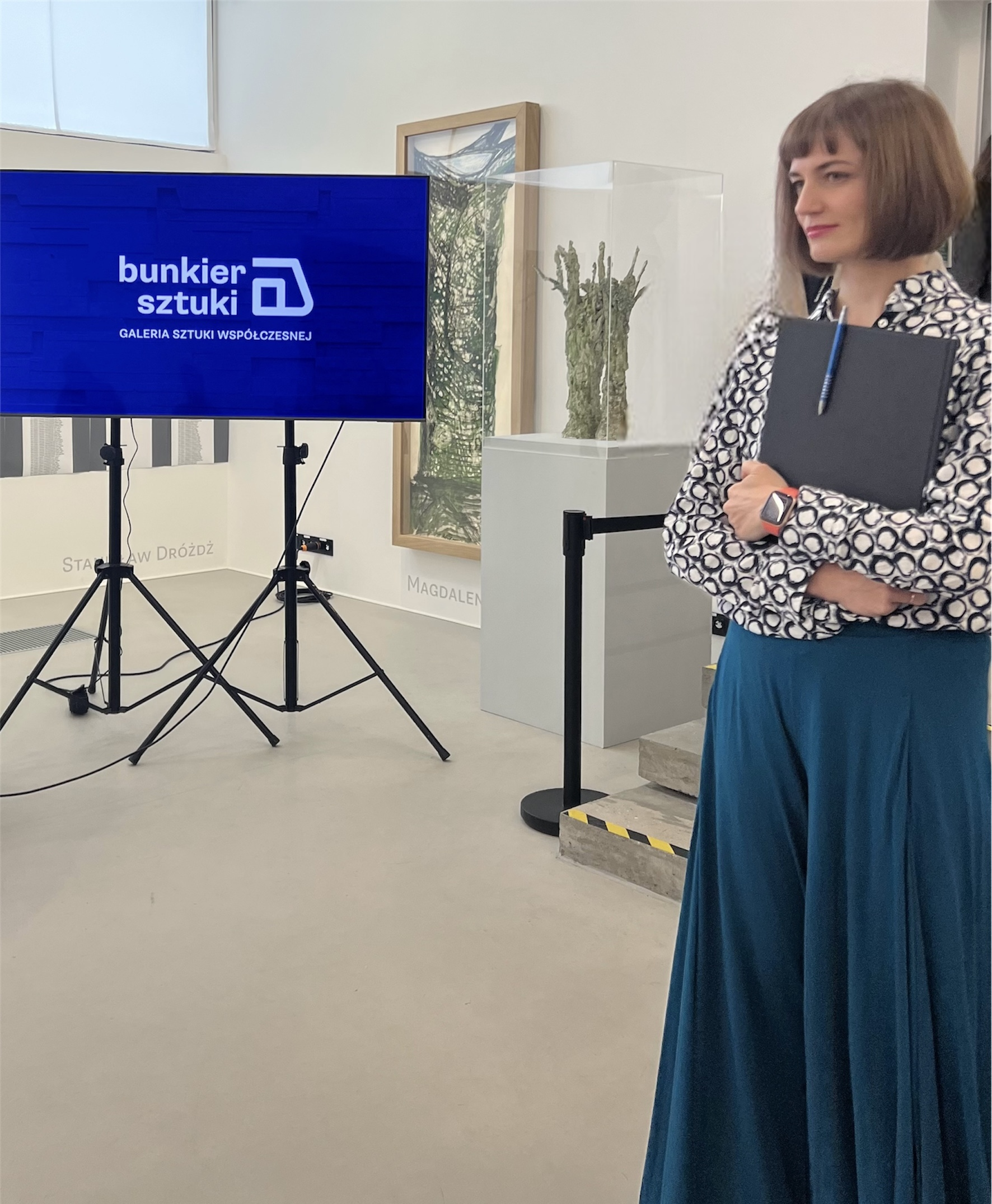
- Delfina Jałowik, 2024
- Education: Jagiellonian University
- Occupations: Art curator, art historian

Delfina Anna Jałowik is an art curator and historian who was appointed director of Bunkier Sztuki in March 2024, replacing Masza Potocka in the position.

== Biography ==
From 2010 to 2024 she worked at the Museum of Contemporary Art in Kraków, where she was Head of the Art Department. From 2005 to 2011, she studied Inter-faculty Individual Studies in the Humanities at the Jagiellonian University, majoring in philosophy and art history. She held scholarships at Ruprecht Karl University of Heidelberg and Humboldt University of Berlin. In 2017 she obtained doctorate in philosophy at the Jagiellonian University, upon dissertation Ciało aktywne, ciało społeczne. Teorie estetyczne wobec zaangażowanych postaw społeczno-politycznych w sztuce współczesnej supervised by Krystyna Wilkoszewska.

== Books (edited by) ==
- Filozofia a Zagłada. Kraków. 2021. ISBN 978-83-65851-44-4.
