= Lin Qiang =

Lin Qiang may refer to:

- Lin Qiang (footballer) (born 1960), Chinese footballer
- Lin Qiang (politician) (born 1969), Chinese politician
- Lim Giong (林強; Lín Qiáng, born 1964), Taiwanese musician and actor
