= Bonatz =

Bonatz is a surname. Notable people with the surname include:

- Heinz Bonatz (1897–1981), German naval officer
- Karl Bonatz (1882–1951), German architect, brother of Paul
- Paul Bonatz (1877–1956), German architect
