= Christian Boros =

German entrepreneur and art collector

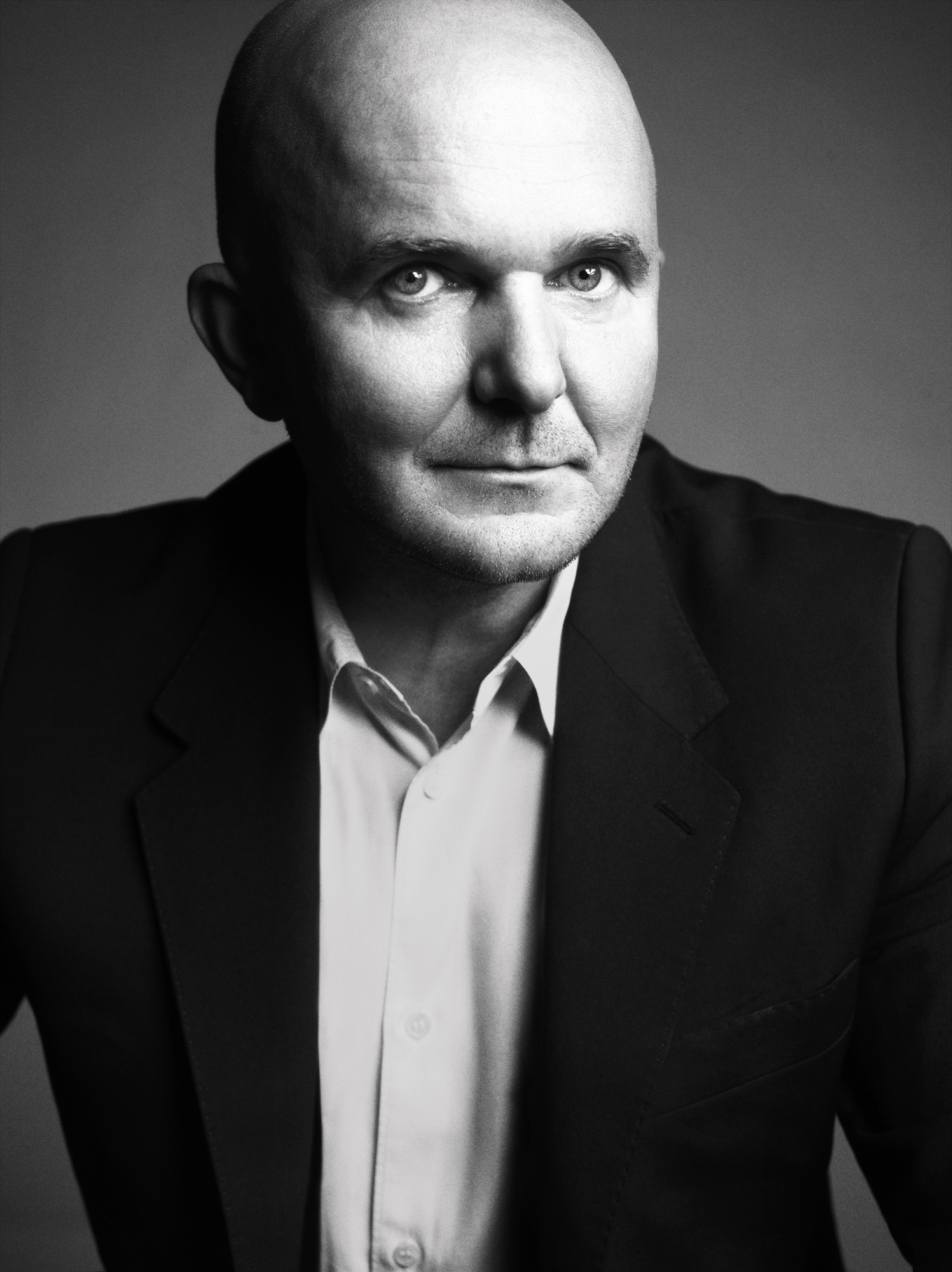
- Born: Christian Boros; 1964 (age 61–62); Zabrze, Poland
- Education: University of Wuppertal
- Known for: advertising agency founder and art collector
- Spouse: Karen Lohmann

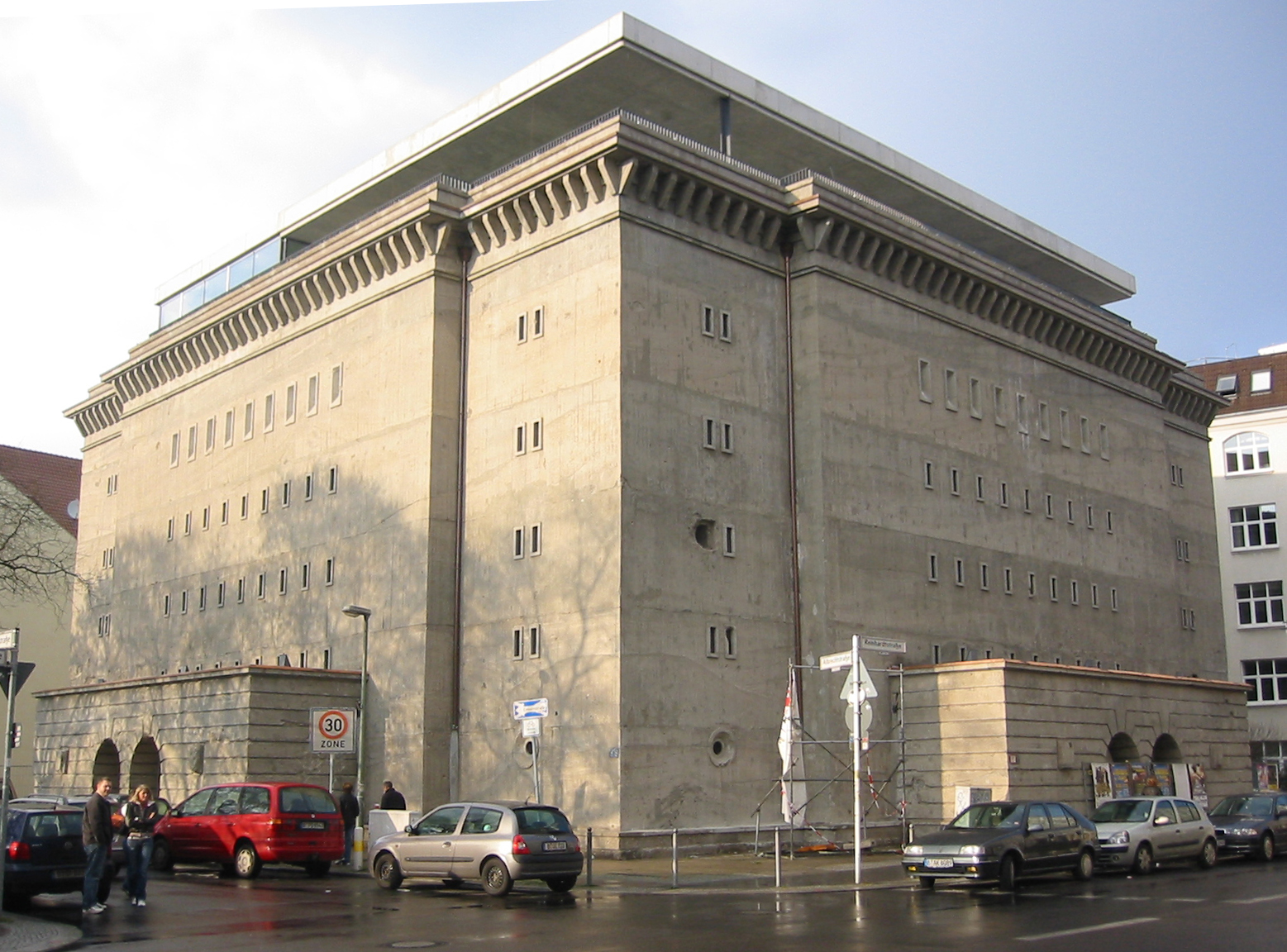
The Reichsbahnbunker, now an art gallery owned by Boros

Christian Boros (born 1964) is a German advertising agency founder and art collector, who owns an art gallery in a former bunker in Berlin.

== Early life ==
Christian Boros was born in Zabrze, Poland in 1964. His family moved from Poland to Cologne, West Germany, in order to escape communism. Boros earned a degree in communication design from the University of Wuppertal, Germany. He wrote his thesis on the aesthetic of the evil characters in James Bond.

== Career ==
Boros founded an eponymous advertising agency in Wuppertal. Boros has appeared in the ARTnews list of the top 200 collectors since 2006.

In 2003, Boros and his wife purchased a former Second World War bomb shelter, the Reichsbahnbunker in Mitte, Berlin. The bunker was converted by Casper Mueller Kneer, who are responsible for White Cube in London. In 2008, Boros opened his gallery in the bunker. The gallery space of 30,000 square feet (2,800 m^{2}) was designed by Realarchitektur, including the rooftop residential penthouse, and contained pieces that Boros had been collecting for over 30 years. The collection includes numerous works by Danh Vo, Elizabeth Peyton, Wolfgang Tillmans, Ai Weiwei, Thomas Ruff, Klara Lidén, Anselm Reyle, Tobias Rehberger and Olafur Eliasson. Entrance to the gallery is by guided tour only.

Boros' bunker was built in 1943 by the architect Karl Bonatz on the orders of Adolf Hitler. After the Second World War, the bunker was used as a fruit warehouse, before later becoming a fetish nightclub, with a reputation for being the "most hardcore club in the world," featuring techno music and frequent sadomasochism (S&M) nights, or "raves and sex parties" according to ARTnews.

Boros bought a building which was home to a children dancing school for twenty years. After the purchase, there was a controversy about doubling of the rental fee in 2009 and alleged speculation. As a result, the dancing school had to leave the building in 2019.

== Personal life ==
Boros is married to Karen Lohmann, and they live in Berlin, in a 550 sq metre (5920 sq feet) penthouse flat above their gallery.
