= Manon Awst =

British sculptor, artist (born 1983)

Manon Awst is a Welsh artist who makes sculptures, installations and performances exploring themes of place, identity and landscape.

Awst grew up in Anglesey, and studied architecture at the University of Cambridge. She lived in Berlin and collaborated with German artist Benjamin Walther between 2007 and 2017. Besides her art career, Awst also writes poetry and is based in Caernarfon, Wales.

She has been selected to represent Wales in Venice at the Venice Biennale in 2026 in collaboration with artist-writer Dylan Huw. They will participate as official collateral events, rather than as pavilions.

== Biography ==
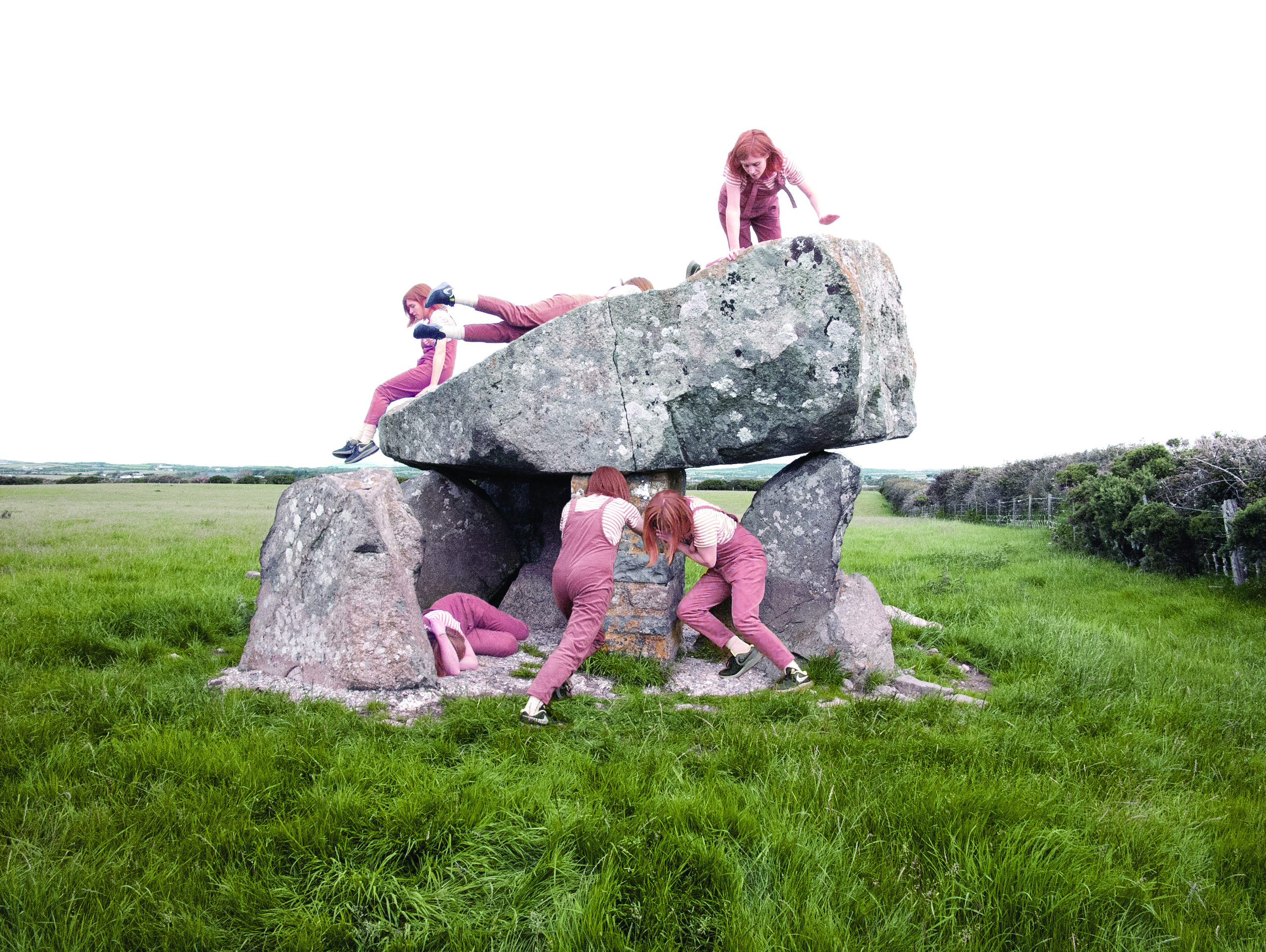
Manon Awst: Portal, July 2020

Growing up on Anglesey in North Wales, speaking Welsh as her first language, Awst attended Ysgol Uwchradd Bodedern and went on to study architecture at Cambridge University. She was awarded the Architecture Scholarship at the National Eisteddfod of Wales in 2004 before moving to Berlin as part of the art collective Pankof Bank, with artist Simon Fujiwara and architect Sam Causer. Their main projects were Pankof Bank Architects at the Architecture Foundation, London and Suppermarket for Deptford X festival, 2005.

From 2006 she worked as part of artist-duo Awst & Walther, exhibiting in the Boros Collection, Kunstmuseum Wolfsburg, Kunstverein Nürnberg, Cass Sculpture Foundation and National Museum Cardiff.

In 2013-15 she studied Artistic Research at the Royal College of Art, London and received a Creative Wales Award from the Arts Council of Wales in 2015, establishing a studio in Caernarfon. She is also known as a Welsh poet, having been a founding member of the female poet group Cywion Cranogwen and participating regularly at events such as Y Talwrn and Ymryson y Beirdd.

She received a Future Wales Fellowship in 2023-25 awarded by Arts Council Wales and Natural Resources Wales and a Henry Moore Institute Research Fellowship in 2025.

== Awst & Walther ==
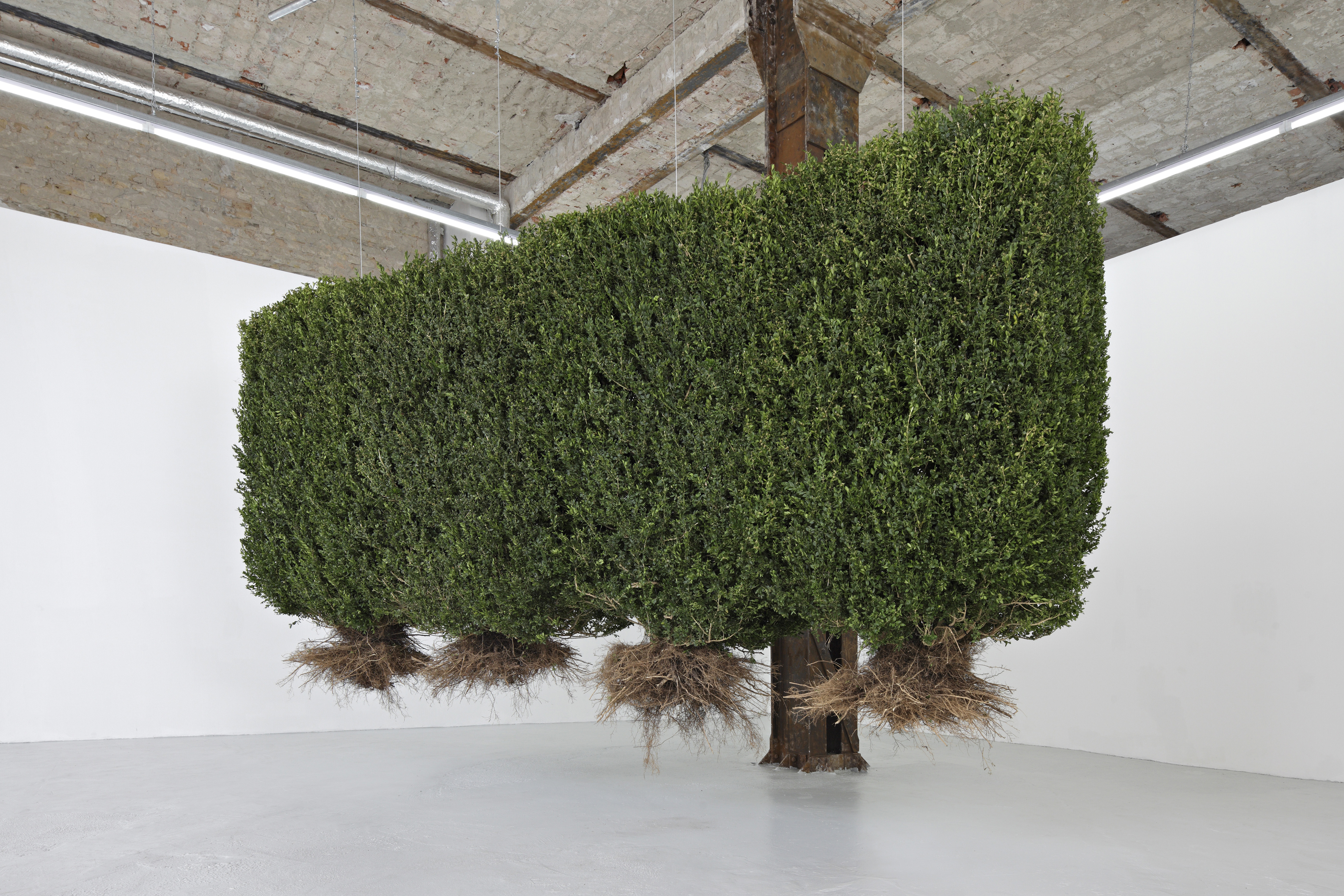
Awst & Walther: Ground to Sky, 2014

Manon Awst and German artist Benjamin Walther collaborated for over ten years, making spatial, diverse and challenging artworks. They were commissioned by the German Embassy, London to create an installation to commemorate the 20th anniversary of the Fall of the Berlin Wall, 2009. 'Work in Progress' was a huge ice wall which stopped the traffic on Belgrave Square, London on 9 November 2009.

In 2010 they received a Fellowship for Artists from the Henry Moore Foundation for a residency at the Künstlerhaus Bethanien, Berlin and were also resident artists at Meetfactory, Prague following an award from the Goethe Institute.

Two of their installations Latent Measures and The Line of Fire were part of the second Boros Collection exhibition at the bunker in Berlin from 2012 to 2016.

Other major works include Ground to Sky, Berlin and Gap to Feed, a permanent installation on Rosa-Luxemburg-Platz, Berlin made from thousands of mussel shells collected on the Menai Strait, North Wales.

They have a permanent installation Far and Wide located at Nant Gwrtheyrn, which was originally made for an interdisciplinary forum at Barclodiad y Gawres, Anglesey.

In 2019, Distanz Verlag published the catalogue Awst & Walther, a comprehensive monograph showcasing the sculptures and creative interventions the artists created over a decade.
