= Szczepański Square =

Square in Kraków, Poland

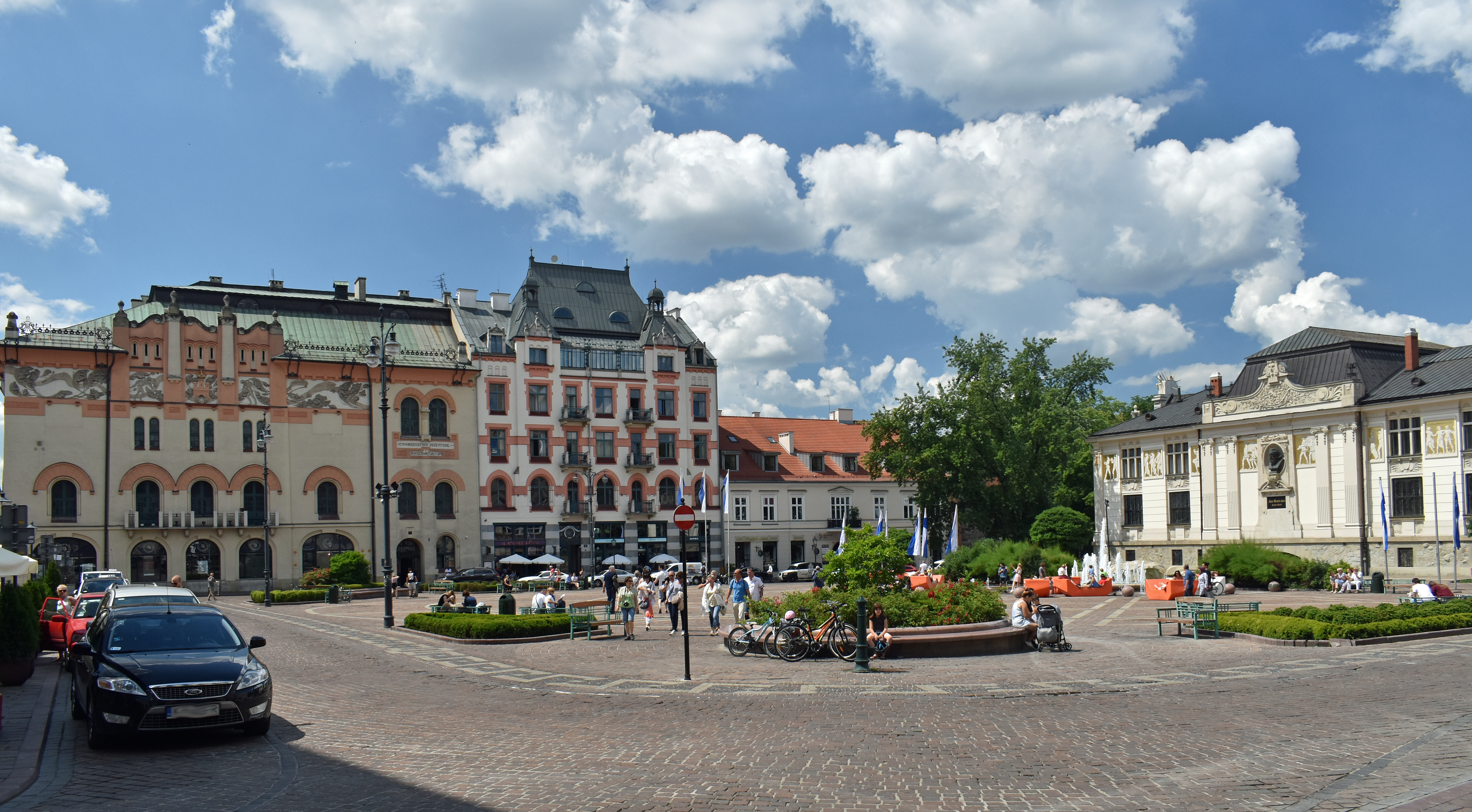
- View of the square in 2012
- Interactive map of Szczepański Square
- Native name: plac Szczepański (Polish)
- Former name: Plac Gwardyi Narodowey
- Location: Kraków
- Coordinates: 50°03′50″N 19°56′08″E

UNESCO World Heritage Site
- Type: Cultural
- Criteria: iv
- Designated: 1978
- Part of: Historic Centre of Kraków
- Reference no.: 29
- Region: Europe and North America

Historic Monument of Poland
- Designated: 1994-09-08
- Part of: Kraków historical city complex
- Reference no.: M.P. 1994 nr 50 poz. 418

Szczepański Square (Polish: Plac Szczepański, lit. Stephen Square) - a historic square located in the Old Town of Kraków, Poland, between Planty Park and św. Tomasza and Szczepańska streets.

== History ==
Szczepański Square was built at the beginning of the 19th century after the demolition of the medieval church of St. Stephen, to which the name of the square refers, and the church of St. Matthias and Matthew together with the adjacent former Jesuit buildings. Initially, it was named Plac Gwardyi Narodowey, because on August 3, 1811, the first review of the National Guard established in Kraków was carried out here. To commemorate this event, a black marble plaque with the following inscription was placed on the Szołayski tenement house located at the square: ''Plac Gwardyi Narodowey ogłoszony dnia 3-go sierpnia 1811 roku''. This name, however, did not catch on among the inhabitants of Kraków and soon the current name of the square was finally established – used colloquially since around 1808. Since the 19th century, one of the largest marketplaces in Kraków operated here, and in the second half of the 20th century (until 2007) – a parking lot. In 2010, the square was modernized, including: adding a fountain on it.

== Buildings ==
The square is surrounded by a number of buildings, including:

- No 1. The 19th-century Art Nouveau building of the Stary Theater, built according to the design of Franciszek Mączyński.
- No 2. Art Nouveau tenement house built in 1908-1909 according to the design of Wiktor Miarczyński. Originally, this place was the rectory of the church of St. Stephen. It was a two-story building, with seven windows at the front, a high roof and a semicircular gate in the central part of the facade, vaulted at the top. The lower part of the facade was made of hewn stone. In the early 19th century, the tenement house was owned by the Estreicher family. On the first floor, at the front, there was a living room decorated with front porches painted by Dominik Estreicher. The house was demolished in 1908, and in its place a modern tenement house in the Vienna Secession style was built for the undertaker J. Wolny.
- No 3a. The post-war building housing a contemporary art gallery of that name, designed by Krystyna Różyska-Tołłoczko.
- No 4. Art Nouveau building of the Society of Friends of Fine Arts called the Palace of Art, built in 1901, also designed by Franciszek Mączyński.
- No 5. The building of the Communal Savings Bank, built in 1936 according to the design of Fryderyk Tadanier and Stefan Strojek in the Art Deco style. It is the tallest building in Krakow's Old Town. It has 7 floors.
- No 8. The building of the Agricultural Society, designed by Sławomir Odrzywolski and built in 1909. In this place there once stood a tenement house, which in the 17th century was owned by the alchemist Michał Sędziwoj. General Jan Zygmunt Skrzyneck lived here in the years 1839–1860.
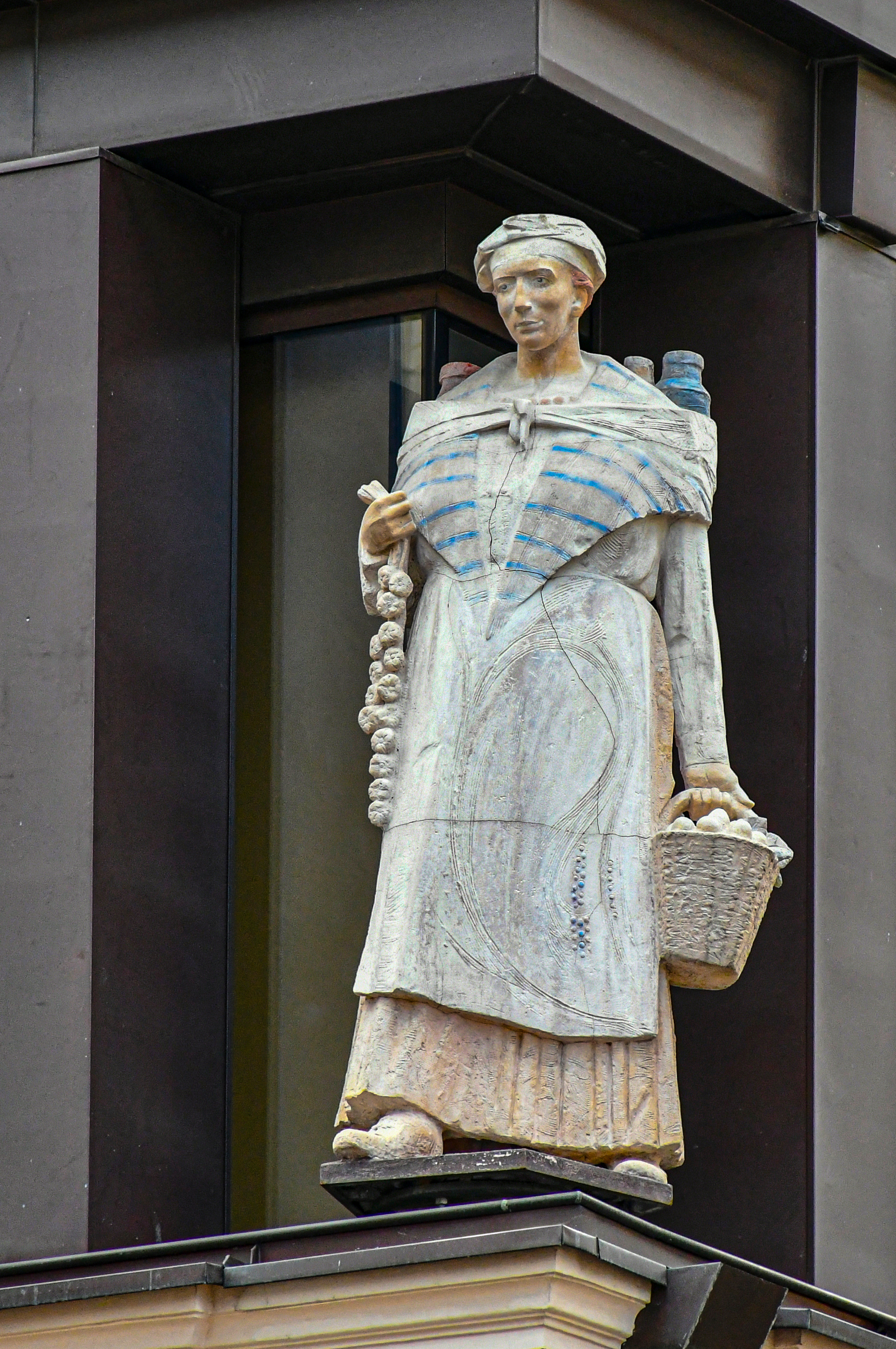
”Miedzianna”-memorial to the vendor from Szczepański Square

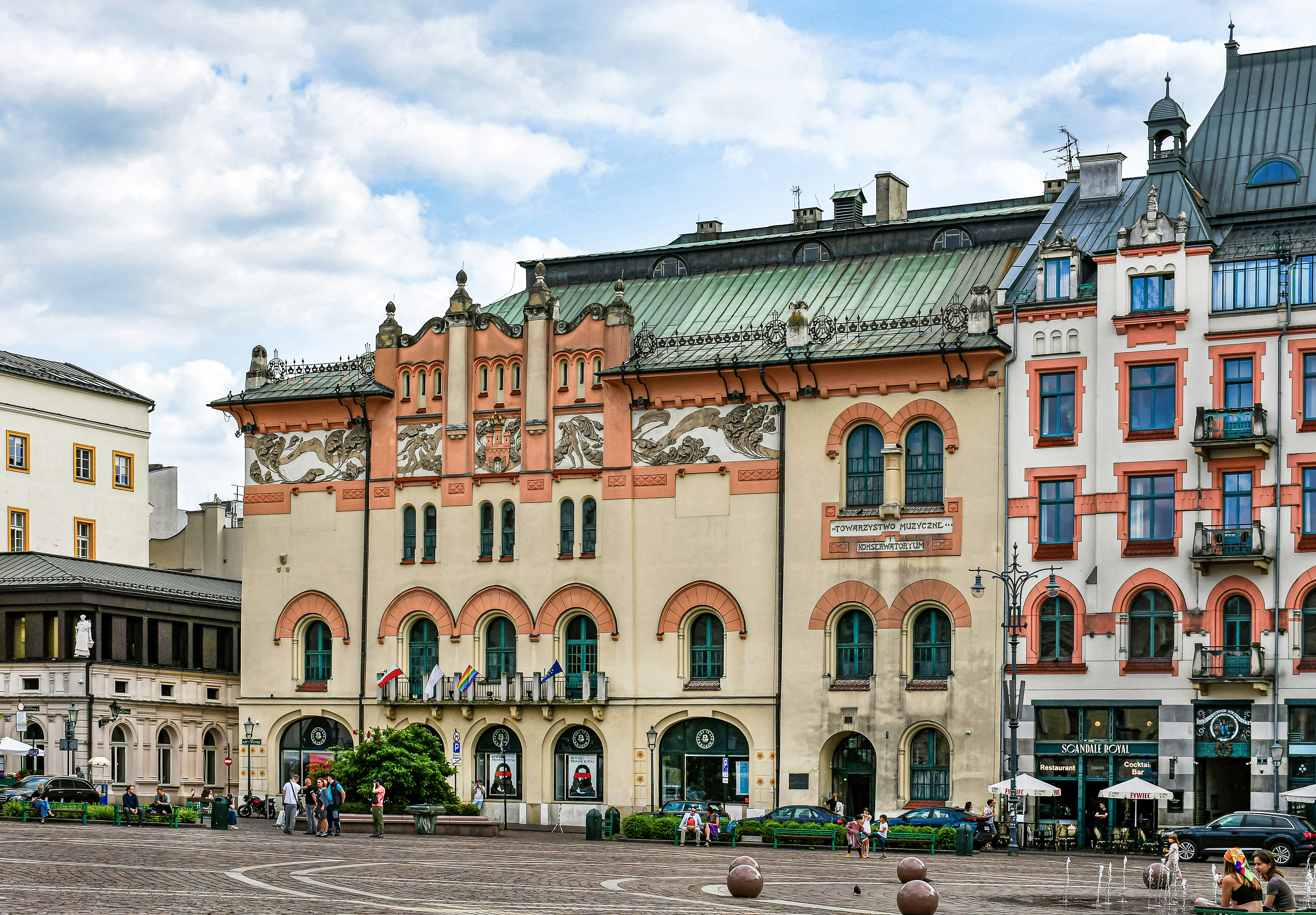
1 Szczepański Sq.
Old Theatre (Stary Teatr)

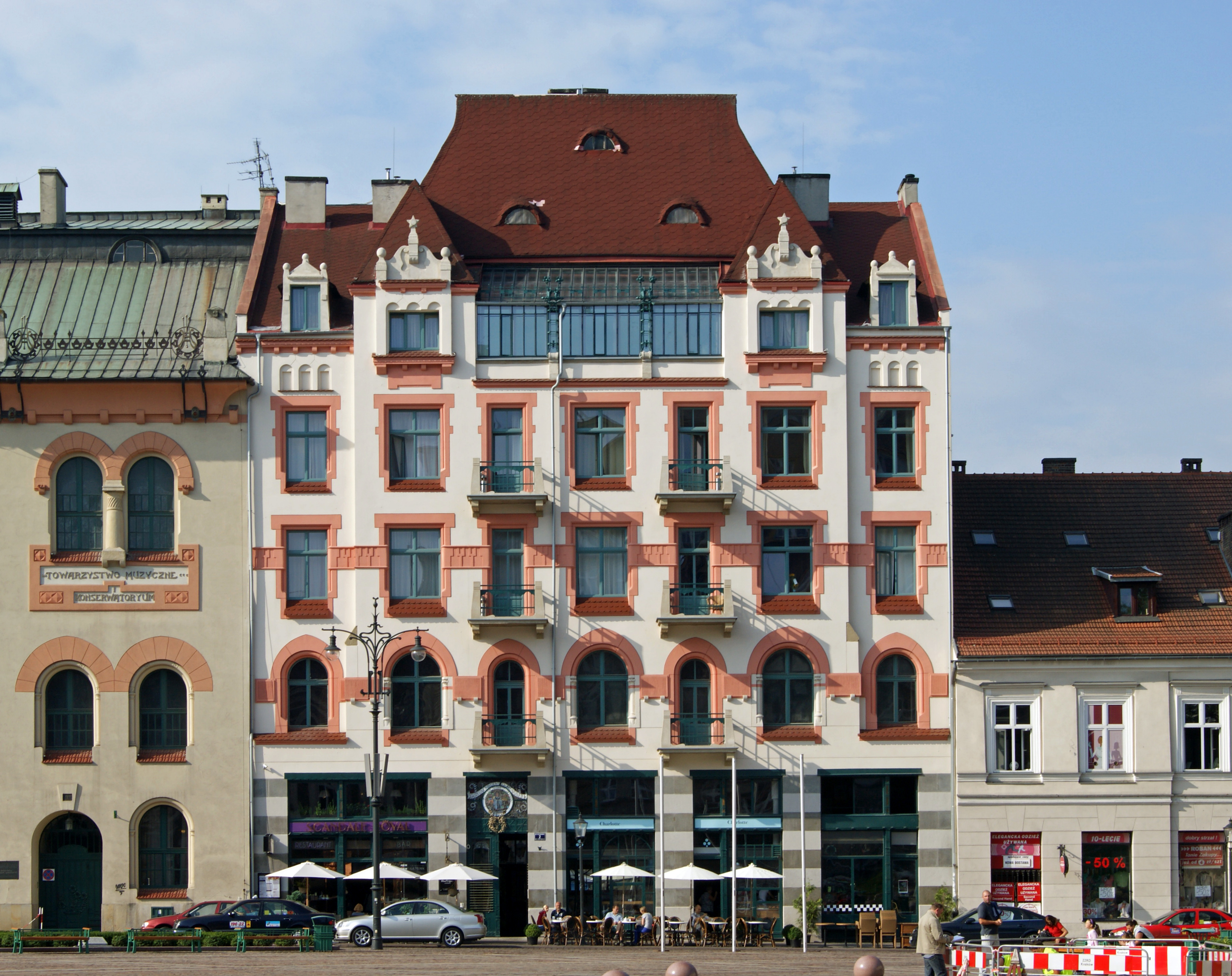
2 Szczepański Sq.
Wolnego Tenement House

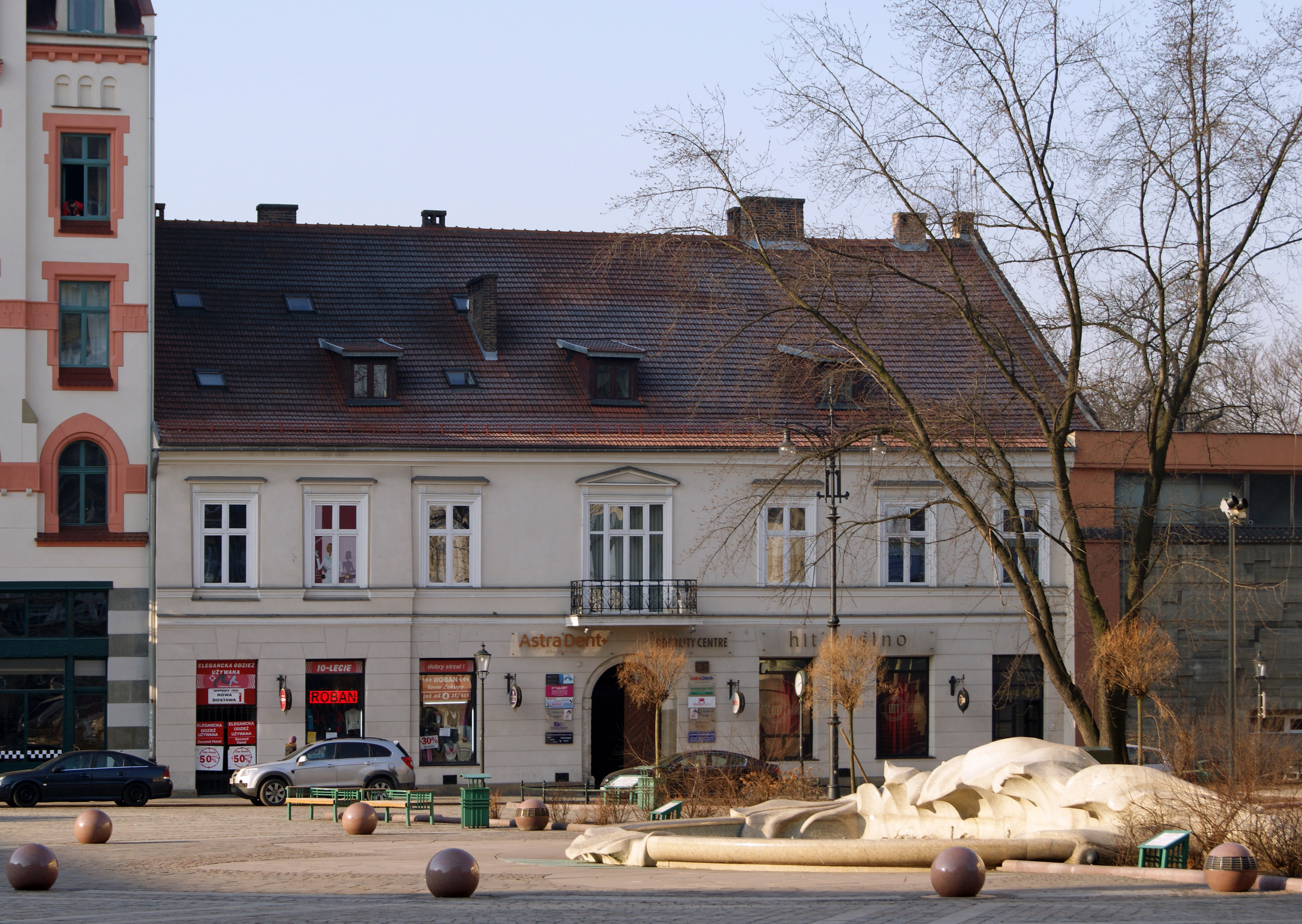
3 Szczepański Sq.
Under the Lord Jesus (Pod Panem Jezusem) Tenement House

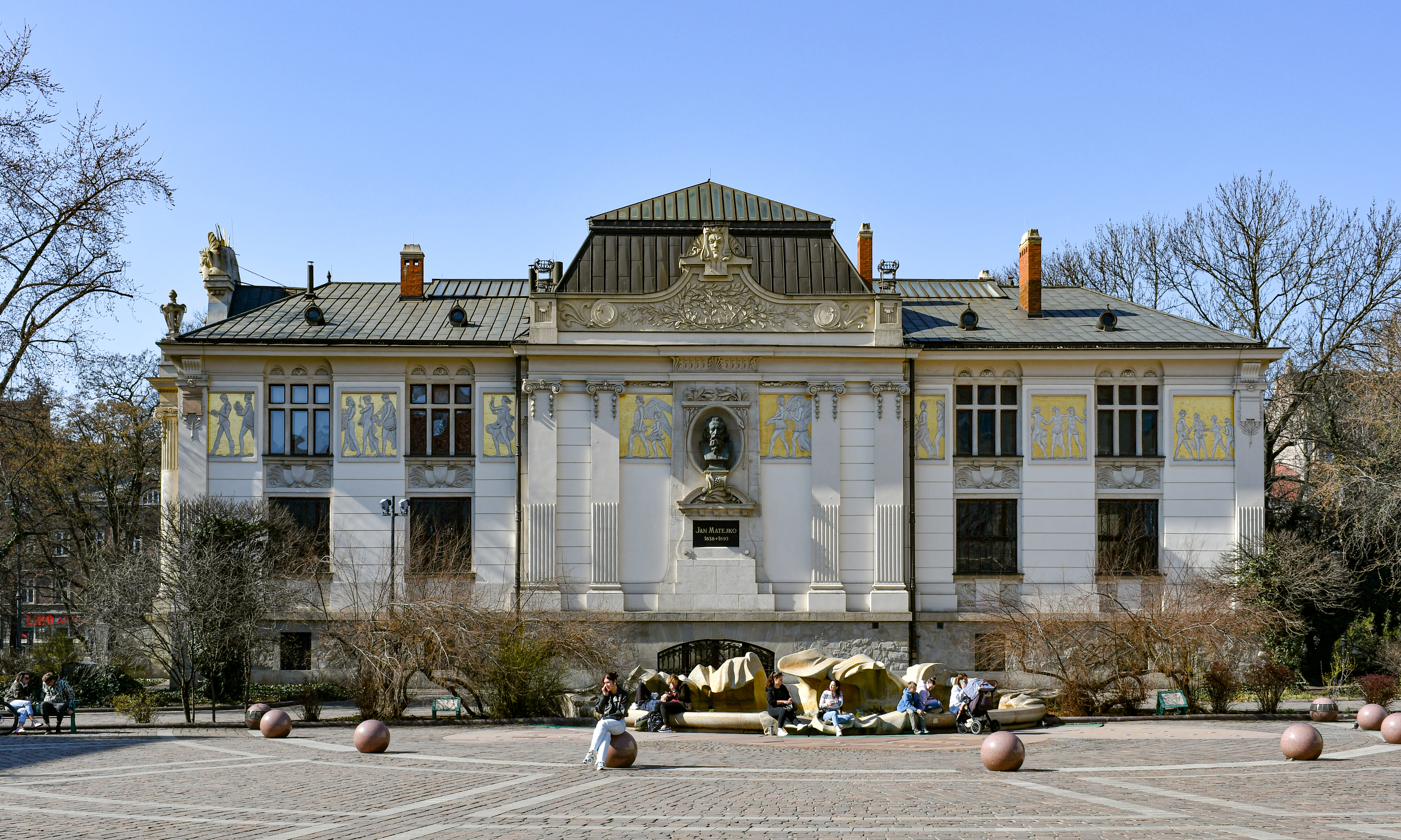
4 Szczepański Sq.
Palace of Art (Pałac Sztuki)
Building of the Kraków Society of Friends of Fine Arts

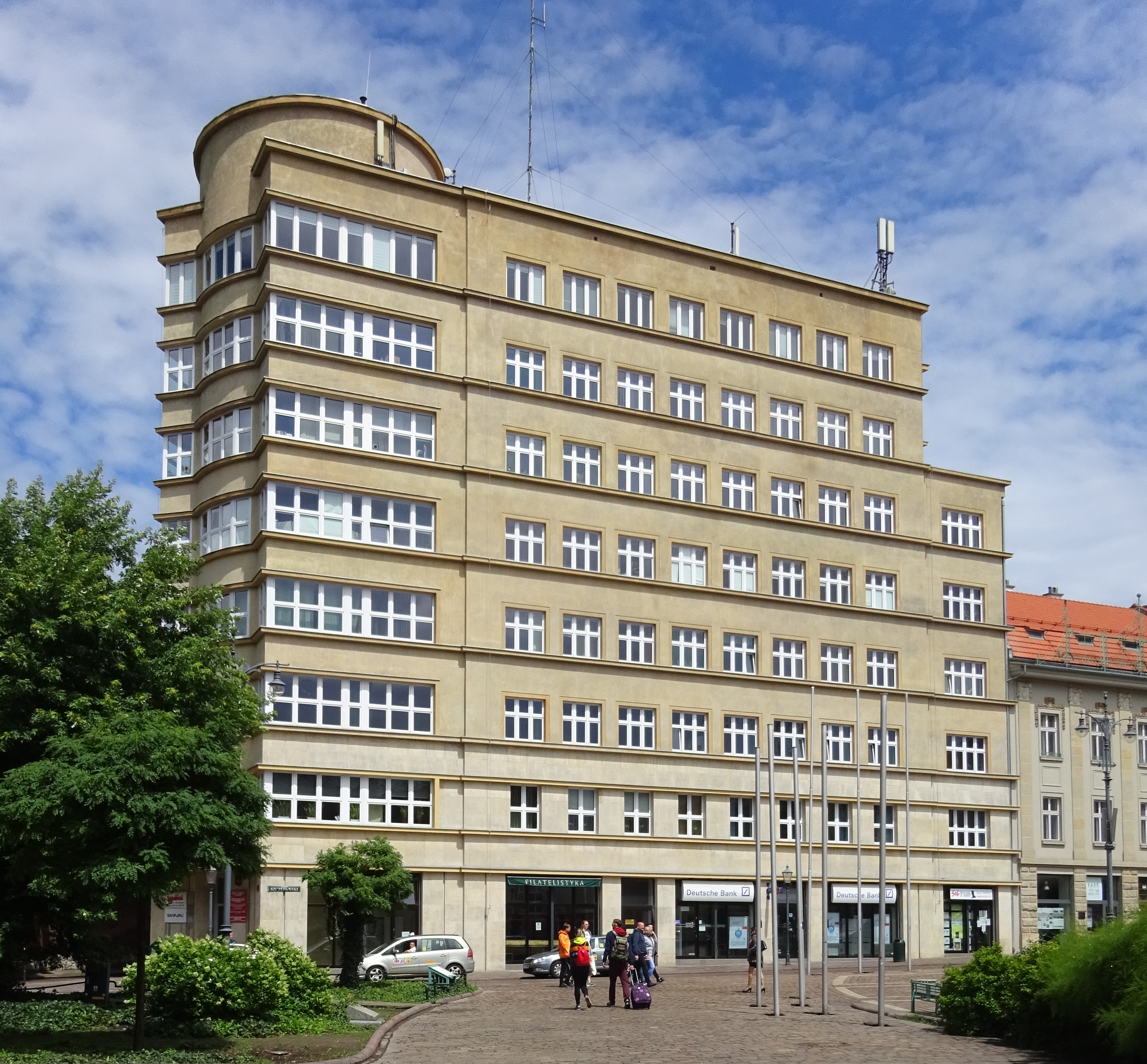
5 Szczepański Sq
Building of the former KKOMK Bank

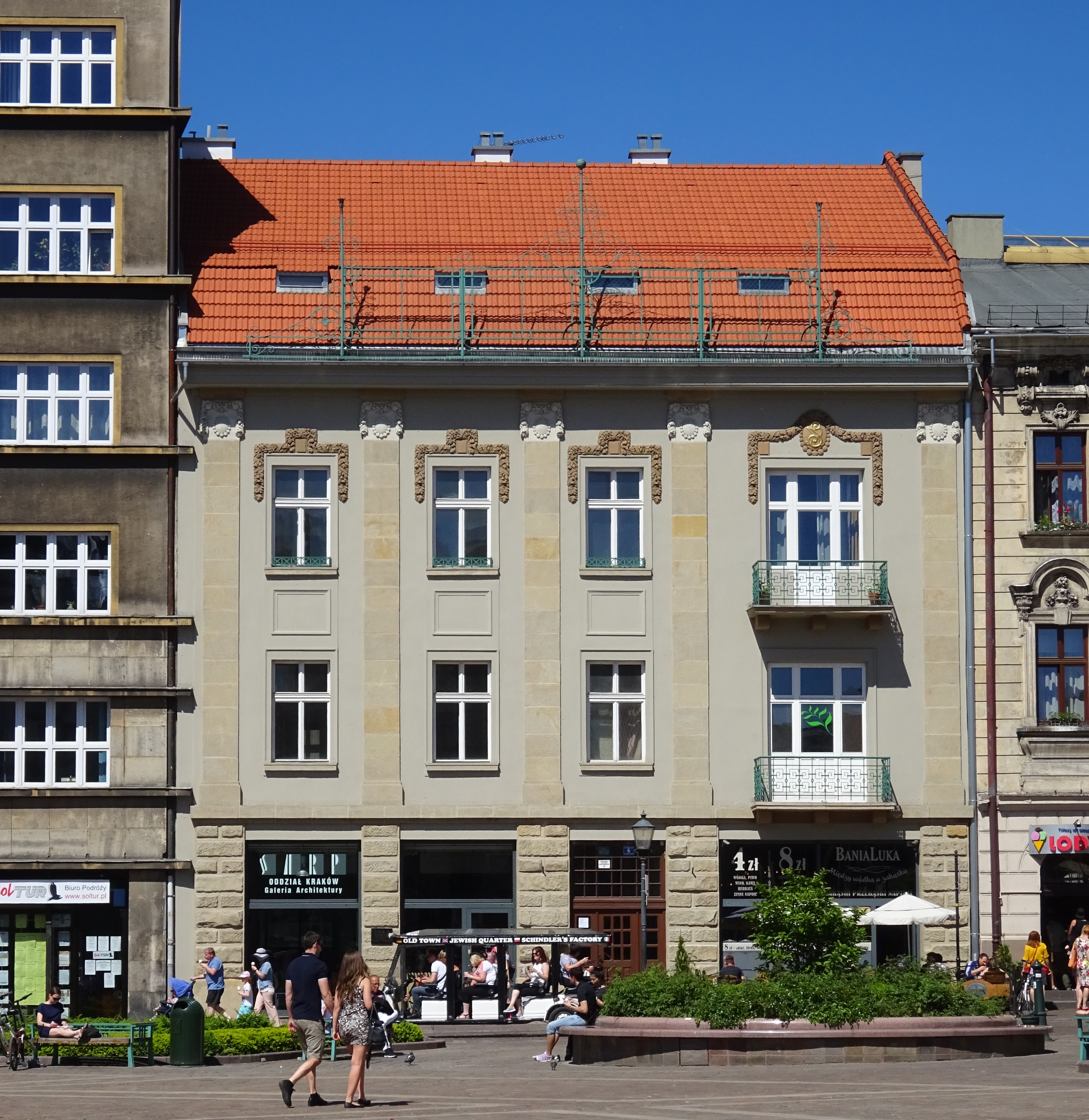
6 Szczepański Sq.
Przechodnia Tenement House

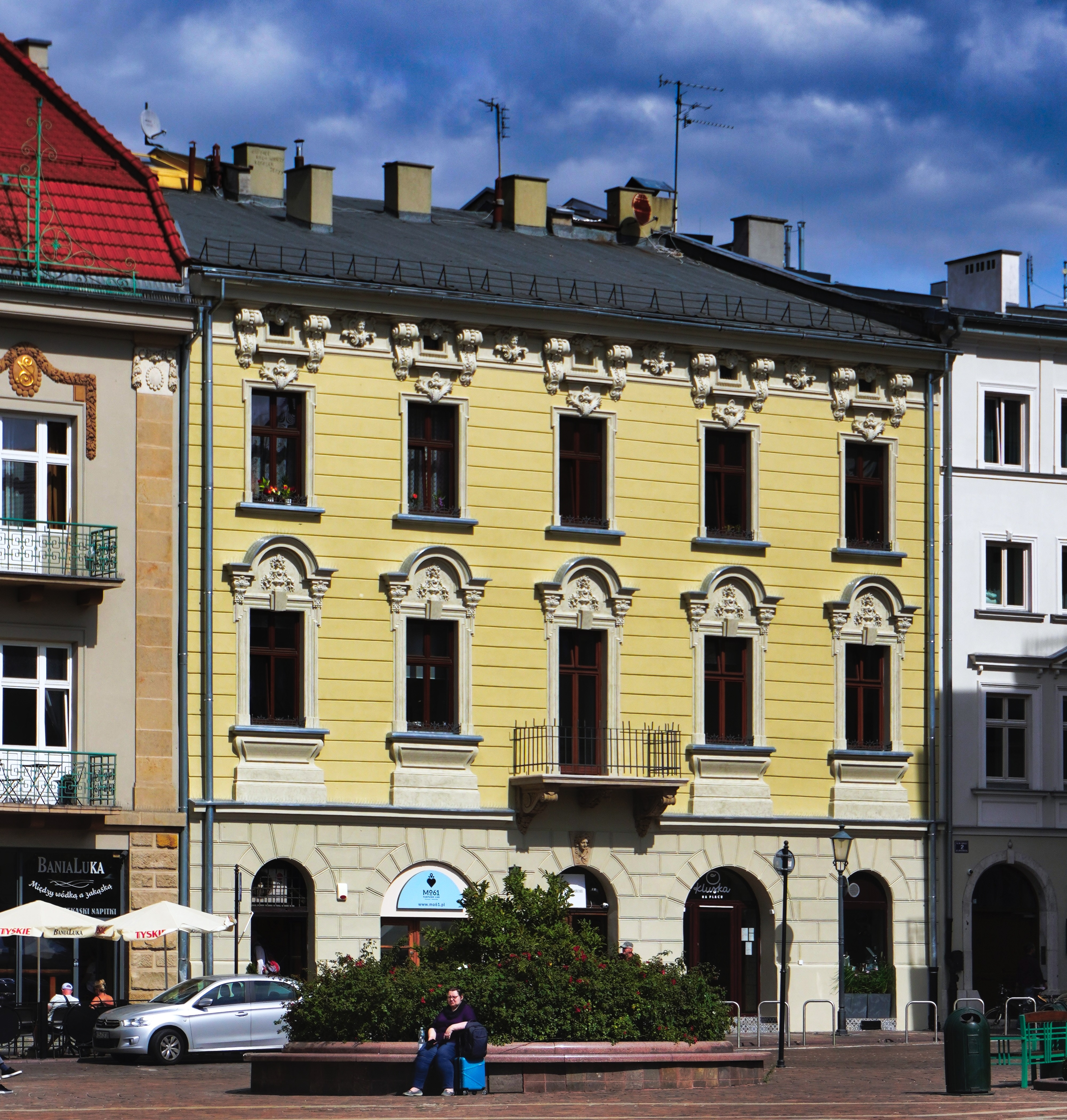
7 Szczepański Sq.
Landauów Tenement House

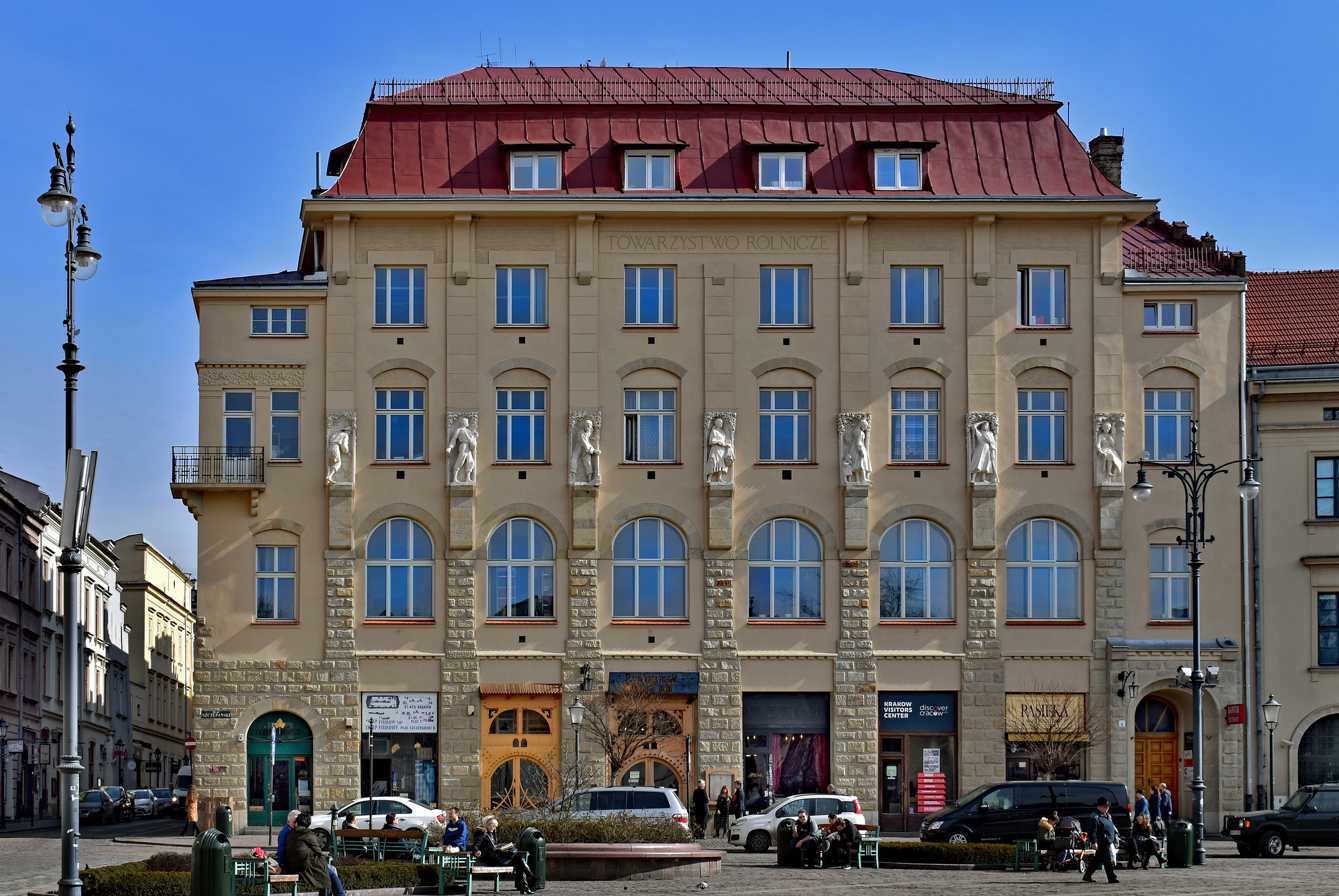
8 Szczepański Sq.
Building of the former Agricultural Society

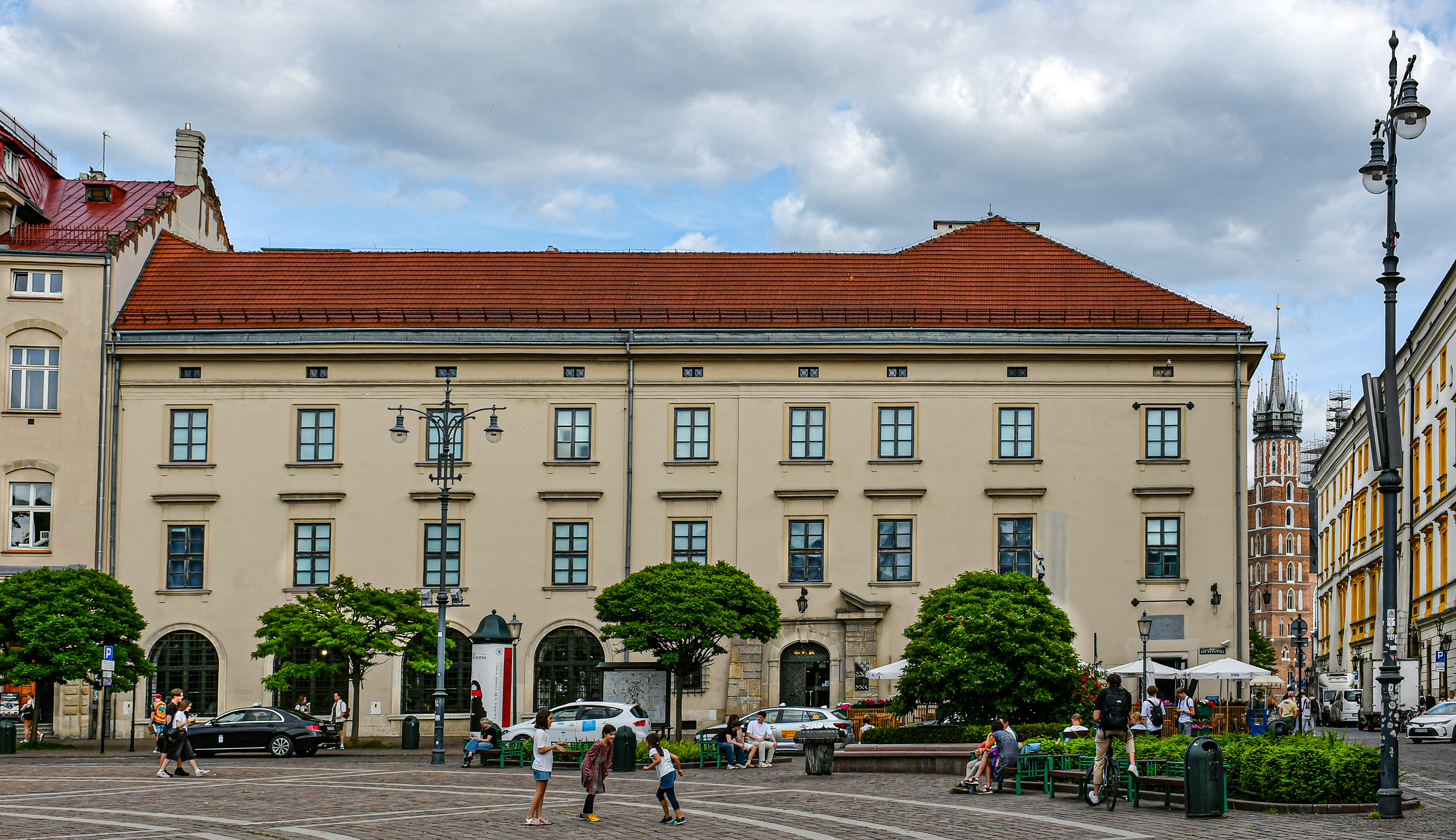
9 Szczepański Sq.
Szołayskich Tenement House

== Bibliography ==
- Encyklopedia Krakowa (in Polish). Wydawnictwo Naukowe PWN. 2000. ISBN 8301133252.
