= Berenice Olmedo =

Mexican artist (born 1987)

- Born: 1987 (age 38–39); Oaxaca, Mexico
- Education: Universidad de las Américas Puebla
- Known for: Sculpture; Performance art

Berenice Olmedo (born 1987) is a Mexican sculptor and performance artist. Her work addresses the body, illness and care, as well as the biopolitics of disability and prosthetic devices. She is based in Mexico City.

== Early life and education ==
Olmedo was born in Oaxaca, Mexico in 1987. She studied at the Universidad de las Américas in Puebla, Mexico.

== Work ==
Olmedo's sculptures are constructed from materials and devices from the medical field, including scoliosis corsets and prosthetic appendages.

A review in Art Papers magazine states that her work "calls into question how ableist and anthropocentric frameworks operate across the sociopolitical spectrum." Writing in Flash Art magazine, Jane Ursula Harris reflects on Olmeda's work as a disruption of "ableist standards of normativity" that allows viewers to "recognize the wellness of diverse bodies."

In her 2012–2015 project Canine Tomatocommerce or The Political-Ethical Dilemma of Merchandise, Olmeda gathered the carcasses of stray dogs killed by vehicles on the streets near Puebla. She created various products from the corpses to display as art including soap made from dog fat and boots, jackets, bags, and fur products from dog skin. She also sold these items at a flea market in Puebla. The carcasses themselves were never directly displayed. Her work was acquired for the Boros Collection in Berlin in 2022.

== Career ==
In 2018, Olmedo displayed sculptures made from secondhand orthotic devices in her first solo exhibition which took place in Cologne. Olmedo has exhibited her work in the 36th São Paulo Art Biennial, the Berkeley Museum and Film Archive, Museum Trondheim, ICA Boston, the Kunsthalle Basel, the Museum of Contemporary Art of Monterrey, and the Museum für Moderne Kunst, Frankfurt.
