= Beat Streuli =

Swiss visual artist (born 1957)

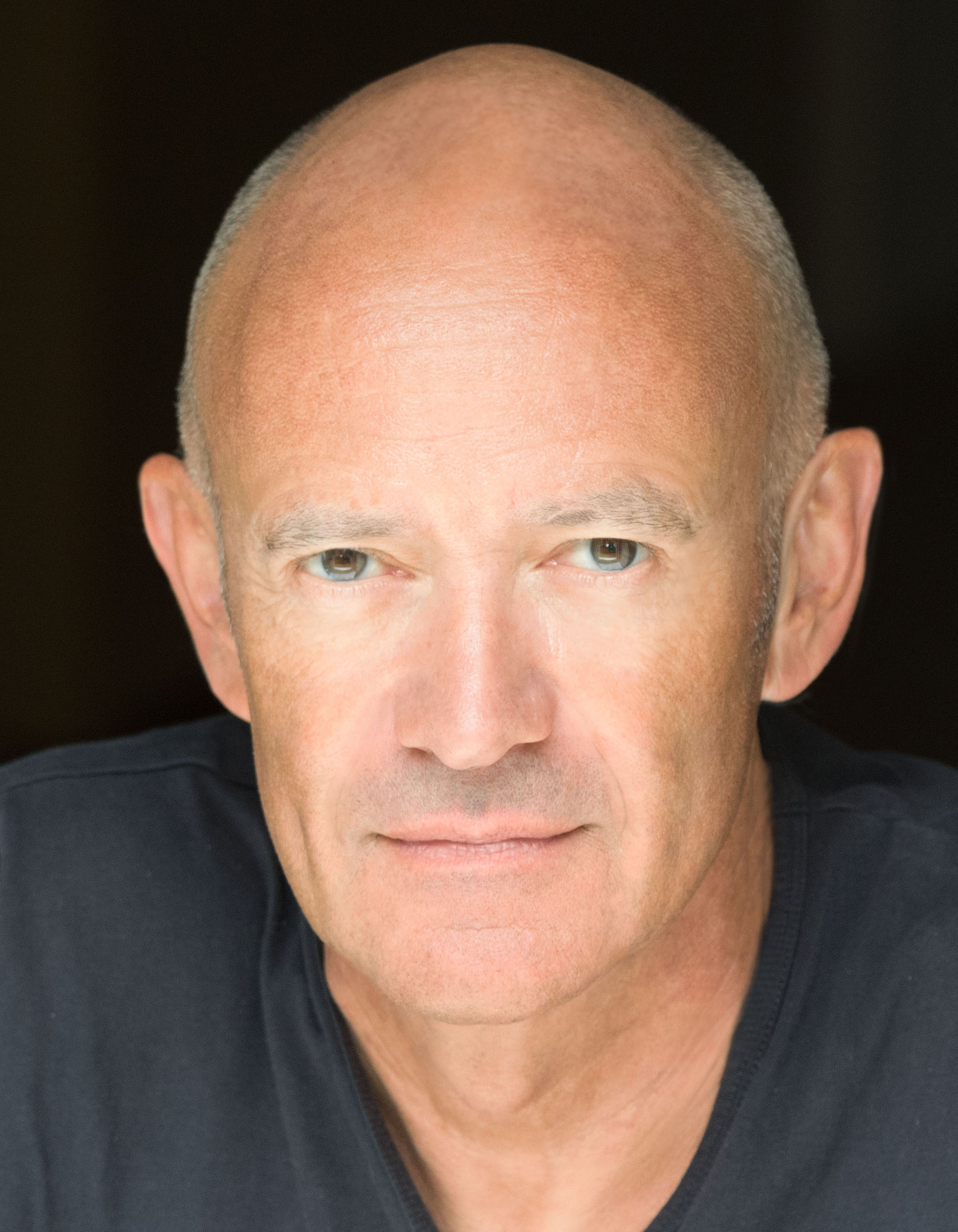
- Streuli in 2015
- Born: 1957 (age 68–69); Altdorf, Uri, Switzerland
- Website: www.beatstreuli.com

Beat Streuli (born 1957) is a Swiss visual artist who works with photo and video based media.

His photographs, videos and window installations have been exhibited in galleries and museums internationally. Permanent installations of his work include those at the Lufthansa Aviation Center, Frankfurt Airport, Germany, the ETH University, Zurich, Switzerland, the Style Company Building, Osaka, Japan, and the immigration hall of Dallas Fort Worth International Airport, Texas, USA.

== Life ==
Streuli was born in 1957 in Altdorf UR. From 1977 to 1983, he attended the Schools of Design in Basel and Zurich and the Hochschule der Künste in Berlin where he lived until 1987. Studio grants followed at Cité des Arts and Fondation Cartier in Paris (1985/1986, 1989 and 1992), at Istituto Svizzero in Rome (1988/1989), in London (1997), and at P.S. 1 in New York City (1993).
Since then Streuli has spent time and worked in cities such as Birmingham, Brussels, Cape Town, New York City and São Paulo, Sydney and Düsseldorf.

== Work ==
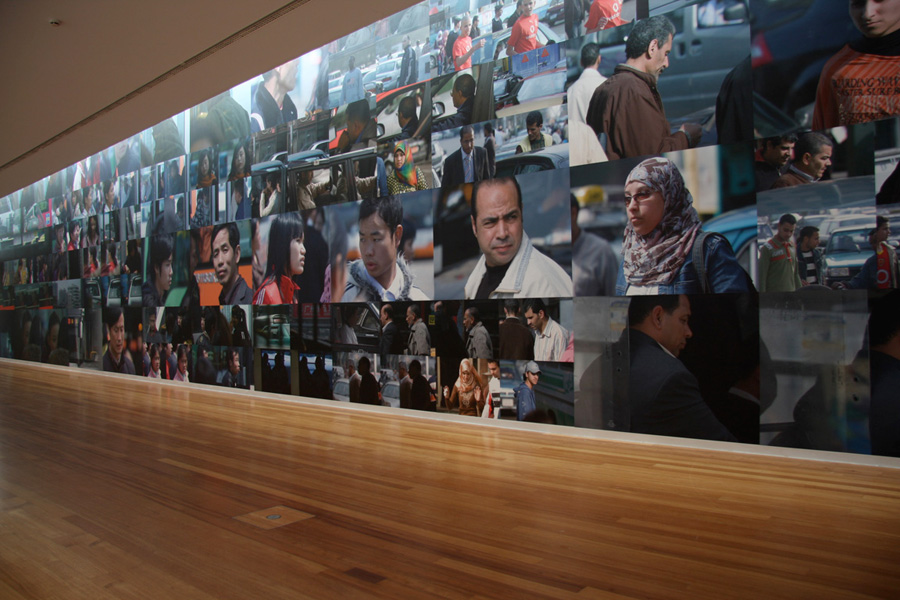
Guangzhou, Cairo, São Paulo 08, 2008 wallpaper installation at Mac's Musée d'Art Contemporain, Grand-Hornu, Belgium 2008

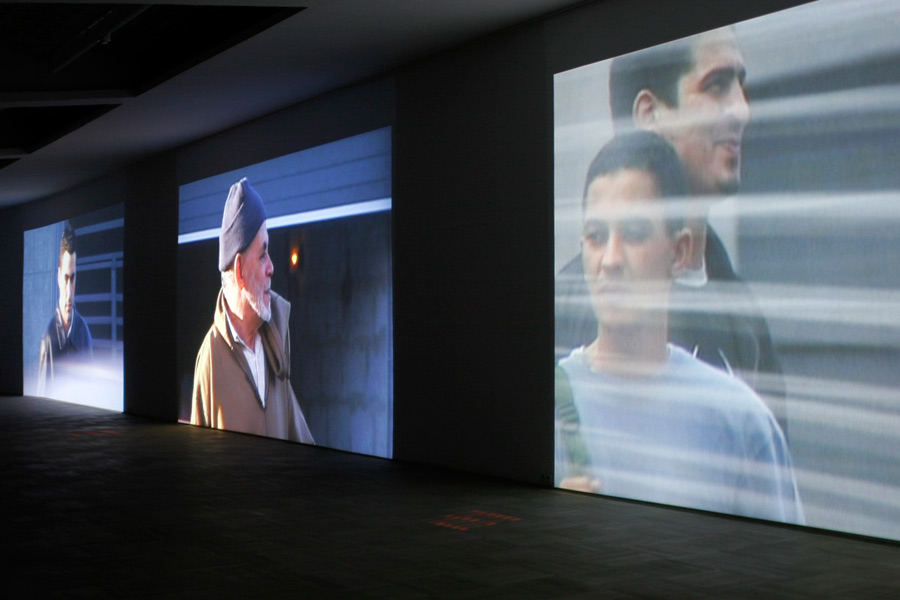
Porte de Flandre / Bruxelles 05, 2006 video screens installations at 'Bunkier Sztuki, Kraków, 2006

Streuli is known for his street portraiture, which has documented the anonymous urban citizen in various cities all over the world, from Sydney and Tokyo to Athens and New York. Streuli's photographs focus systematically on ordinary street dwellers, and the contemporary ‘flaneurs’ going about their daily business. The heterogeneity of the crowd, as the central component of the cultural dynamism of modernity, and the position of the individual in the crowd, lie at the core of Streuli's practice. He works with a variety of presentation media, from large-format colour photographs, and installations of slide and video projections, to billboards and large-scale window installations on the facades of public buildings.

His camera freezes or distills the flow of everyday life, the movement of people in the city, reflecting on daily reality from an entirely anthropocentric perspective. Photographing with the use of a telephoto lens, Streuli captures his subjects in an unguarded state, bringing them in close proximity to the viewer, lending them an iconic aura which transcends the ordinariness of the scene portrayed. Although they remain anonymous, equal under the lens of the camera, a sense of individual lives and diversity emerges. The viewers are implicated through the shared experience of negotiating public space, the natural state of watching and being scrutinized, of moving and paying attention.

== Publications ==
=== Publications by Streuli ===
- Streuli, Beat (1999). CITY. Ostfildern: Cantz / Kunsthalle Düsseldorf and Kunsthalle Zürich.
- Streuli, Beat (2003). New York 2000-02. Ostfildern: Hatje Cantz.
- Streuli, Beat (2008). BXL. Zurich: jrp ringier, Mac's, Grand-Hornu.
- Streuli, Beat (2012). New Street. Birmingham: Ikon Gallery. ISBN 978-1904864806.

=== Publications with contributions by Streuli ===
- Belonging, Sharjah Biennial 7. Sharjah / U.A.E: Sharjah Biennial. 2005.
- Yokohama 2005. Yokohama: International Triennale of Contemporary Art. 2005.
- Guggenheim Collection: 1940s to Now. Melbourne: National Gallery of Victoria. 2007.
- Objectivités. Paris: Musée d'Art Moderne de la Ville de Paris / Paris Musées. 2008.
- Street & Studio. London: Tate Modern / Tate Publishing. 2008.
- Fried, Michael (2008). Why photography matters as art as never before. New Haven / London: Yale University Press.

== Solo exhibitions ==
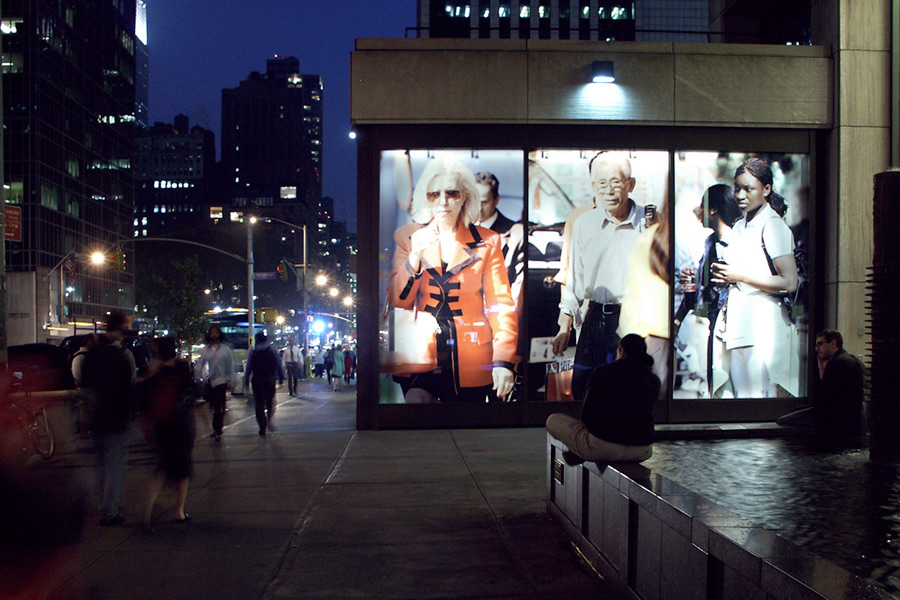
Strangers window installation at International Center of Photography, New York City, 2003

- 1995: Centre d'Art Contemporain / attitudes, Geneva, Galerie Walcheturm, Zurich, Württembergischer Kunstverein, Stuttgart, Le Consortium, Dijon
- 1996: museum in progress, Vienna, Tinglado Dos, Tarragona, ARC, Musée d'Art Moderne de la Ville de Paris, Paris, The New York Kunsthalle, with Adrian Schiess, New York
- 1997: Tate Gallery, London
- 1998: Museu d'Art Contemporani, Barcelona, Yamaguchi Prefecture Museum, Yamaguchi
- 1998: Rencontres d'Arles festival, France
- 1999/2000: Museum of Contemporary Art, Chicago, Kunsthalle, Düsseldorf, Kunsthalle, Zurich, Sprengel Museum, Hannover, Spiral Art Center, Tokyo
- 2000: Stedelijk Museum, Amsterdam, Galleria Civica d'Arte Moderna e Contemporanea, Torino
- 2002: Palais de Tokyo, Paris
- 2004: Jablonka Galerie, Cologne, LACE, Los Angeles, Roberts & Tilton Gallery, Los Angeles
- 2006: Bunkier Sztuki, Kraków, University of Massachusetts, University Gallery, Amherst, Dogenhaus Galerie, Leipzig, Galerie Wilma Tolksdorf, Berlin
- 2007: Galerie Eva Presenhuber, Zurich, Galerie Conrads, Düsseldorf, Museum der bildenden Künste, Leipzig
- 2008: Mac's, Musée des Arts Contemporains, Grand-Hornu
- 2008: Jordan Festival, billboard installation, Petra
- 2008: Elite Runners, South Shields 07, Baltic Centre for Contemporary Art, Sage Gateshead, Gateshead, UK
- 2010: Galerie Erna Hécey, Brussels, Murray Guy, New York
- 2012: Ikon Gallery, Birmingham, UK
