= Lin Qiang (politician) =

Chinese politician

- 林强

Mayor of Tieling
- In office July 2013 – September 2014
- Preceded by: Wu Yesong (吴野松)
- Succeeded by: Sun Yi (孙轶)

Personal details
- Born: May 1969 (age 57) Qinglong County, Hebei, China
- Party: Chinese Communist Party (1991–2015; expelled)
- Education: Shenyang Normal University; Liaoning University

Lin Qiang (simplified Chinese: 林强; traditional Chinese: 林強; pinyin: Lín Qiáng; born May 1969) is a former Chinese politician who spent most of his career in northeast China's Liaoning province. In September 2014, he was put under investigation by the Central Commission for Discipline Inspection; at the time of the investigation, he was serving as the mayor of Tieling.

== Life and career ==
Lin was born and raised in Qinglong County, Hebei. He entered Shenyang Normal University in September 1988, majoring in mathematics, where he graduated in August 1991. Then he was accepted to Liaoning University, majoring in Chinese language. At the same time, he taught at the 74th Middle School in Xinchengzi District. He soon became the president and Chinese Communist Party Committee Secretary of 119th Middle School.

Lin served as Shenyang Municipal Party Committee Secretary of the Communist Youth League and CCP Committee Secretary. He also served as Vice-Mayor of Fuxin between October 2005 to September 2006. Then he was transferred to Liaozhong County and served as CCP Deputy Committee Secretary and County Governor. He served as Deputy Communist Party Secretary of Heping District in April 2011, and one year later promoted to the Communist Party Secretary position.

In February 2013, he was appointed the Deputy Communist Party Secretary of Tieling, he concurrently served as Mayor of Tieling in July 2013, he remained in that positions until September 2014, when he was taken away by the Central Commission for Discipline Inspection for corruption.

On February 9, 2015, after approval by the Liaoning party organization, Lin was expelled from the CCP. He was accused of embezzlement, abuse of power, and taking "massive bribes." He was then turned over to judicial authorities for prosecution.

Government offices
Preceded by Wu Yesong	Mayor of Tieling; 2013–2014	Succeeded by Sun Yi
