= Masza Potocka =

Art critic and curator (born 1950)

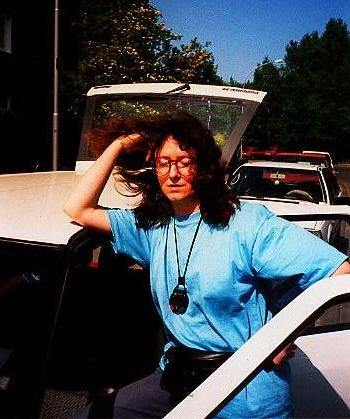
- Masza Potocka, 1992
- Born: 1950 (age 75–76)
- Occupations: Art curator, art critic

Masza Potocka, actually Maria Anna Potocka née Socha (born 1950) is an art critic and curator.

== Biography ==
From 1972 to 2010 she managed contemporary art galleries: Galeria PI, Galeria Pawilon, Galeria Foto-Video, Galeria Potocka. From 2002 to 2010 she was director of Bunkier Sztuki. From 2010 to 2024 she was director of MOCAK. From 2019 to 2024 she was again director of Bunkier Sztuki. She was a member of the jury of the Nike Award in 2016, 2017, 2023, and 2024. She was dismissed from MOCAK in November 2024 due to allegations of workplace bullying that were confirmed by the court. Also in 2024 she resigned from being a jury member of the Nike Award. At the 2024 Nike gala, Adam Michnik compared Potocka to Maria Janion and Jan Błoński.

== Books ==
- Malarstwo. 1995.
- Rzeźba. 2002.
- Estetyka kontra sztuka. 2006.
- To tylko sztuka. 2008.
- Fotografia. 2010.
- Wypadek polityczny. 2010.
- Kobieta postfeministyczna. Dyktatura kobiet. Austeria. 2022.

== Awards ==
- Silver Cross of Merit (2014)
- Austrian Cross of Honour for Science and Art, First Class (2017)
