= He Xiangyu =

Chinese Contemporary Artist

- Born: 1986 (age 38–39); Kuandian, Liaoning, China
- Education: Shenyang Normal University
- Known for: Painting, Installation
- Notable work: Coca-Cola Project, Tank Project

He Xiangyu (Chinese: 何翔宇; born 1986) is a Chinese contemporary artist based in Berlin and Beijing.

== Background ==
He Xiangyu graduated from the Oil Painting Department of Shenyang Normal University in 2008 with a bachelor's degree. His work has been featured in group exhibitions and public collections worldwide. He was a finalist in the 2014 "Future Generation Art Prize", a price founded by the Victor Pinchuk Foundation, Kyiv, Ukraine

== Artwork ==
His art is centered on investigating and engaging with the operating mechanisms and structural relationships of current social systems. He first garnered attention for his large-scale works, such as "The Coca-Cola Project" and "Tank Project", which explore both objects and symbols from everyday life. Through either a physical or conceptual transformation, his works generate a direct and provocative statement while triggering various interpretations and experiences. Since Everything We Create is Not Ourselves in 2013, He began exploring his artistic experiments from a different perspective and dimension, turning from the production of symbols in the visual world to the sensation and inspection of the inner world, emphasizing the universality of art based on the body and the imagination born of it.

=== Coca-Cola Project ===
The Coca-Cola Project, initiated in early 2009 and completed at the end of 2011, began when the artist bought one ton of Coca-Cola at a large supermarket. He then proceeded to construct a "kitchen" in his studio, and during this time made numerous sketches and conducted various related experiments. At the end of 2009, the artist decided to move the operation to Dandong, Liaoning Province, a city that borders North Korea. Here He employed ten workers who together fabricated ten iron vessels within a site structure. The structure was built using over ten tons of lumber and featured waterproof canopies. Working on the project uninterruptedly for over one and a half years, which totaled more than 6000 hours, the artist and his team ultimately cooked 127 tons of Coca-Cola and extracted 40 cubic meters of cooked residue. During the process of extraction, a range of groups—which included public security, firefighters, border control, and environmental organizations—all came to investigate, inspect and collect evidence, which ultimately led to the artist incurring fees and fines.

=== Tank project ===
Tank Project began in late 2011 and was completed in early 2013. The prototype of the tank, tank model T34, was found near an army base positioned at the frontier between North Korea and China. This specific tank model has been used as the primary tank within China's armed forces and has also been the same tank that was used during sensitive incidents in China's recent history. Since large-scale measuring tools are widely unavailable, He had to coordinate a team to sneak into the army base in the middle of the night to measure portions of the tank by hand. It took four months to determine all the measurements of the tank, culminating in corresponding plans designed from these very measurements that were detailed and meticulous enough to reproduce an actual tank. Using high grade vegetable tanned leather, an "outer-coat" was made using the dimensions and proportions from the plans slightly scaled up. Along with 35 workers, the Tank Project took two years to complete, using more than 250 full-scale leather hides and 50,000 meters of wax string. The finished work weighs over 2 tons. The Tank Project also includes the corresponding interviews, diagrams, and video.

=== Oral Project: Everything We Create is Not Ourselves ===
Starting from 2012, He started the conceptualization of his on-going series of paintings, titled Everything We Create is Not Ourselves. The inspiration was derived from the sensation he experienced while using his tongue to touch the roof of the mouth and he attempted to visualize the sensation through a series of paintings. The artist also engaged in dialogue with psychologists, philosophers, and linguists to discuss this simple but often overlooked sensory experience and how such simple sensation transcends itself into the foundation of human experience.

Because oral is intrinsically linked to the body, the inside and outside is relative to each other in which both are a kind of inner joy, to mobilize your senses. For example, the senses are developed from mobilizing the substance itself to gain pleasure from Coca-Cola or olive oil, it is a kind of illusion, a forged emotion or desire stimulated within the body. This cannot control the quality of the substance, neither can it control what the viewer will see or sense at particular time, but at least through this illusion there is an understanding of the world without an exterior. Everything We Create is not Ourselves is based on experimentations of the thought of an oral organic living substance inside the body, and the artist cannot apply past experience and judgement during the experiment as an individual changes every day, just like olive oil dripping on the wall.

== Exhibitions ==
=== Selected Solo Exhibition ===
Year	Title	Location
2015	Dotted Line III	WHITE SPACE BEIJING, Beijing, China
2015	New Directions: He Xiangyu	Ullens Center for Contemporary Art, Beijing, China
2015	He Xiangyu	Bischoff Projects, Frankfurt, Germany
2014	Dotted Line I	WHITE SPACE BEIJING, Beijing, China
2014	He Xiangyu	White Cube, London, UK
2013	CROSSED BELIEFS, SCAI	The Bathhouse, Tokyo, Japan
2012	HE XIANG YU	WHITE SPACE BEIJING, Beijing, China
2012	A4 Young Artist Experimental Season 2nd Round Exhibition	A4 Contemporary Arts Center, Chengdu, China
2012	Cola Project	4A Centre for Contemporary Asian Art, Sydney, Australia
2011	The Death of Marat	Künstlerhaus Schloß Balmoral, Bad Ems, Germany
2010	The Coca-Cola Project	WALL Art Museum, Beijing, China
2008	The Origin of Everything	RAAB art Gallery, Beijing, China
2008	The Illusion of Dongba	Shenyang Normal University, Shenyang, China
2005	Thoughts Surging in the Heart	Shenyang Normal University, Shenyang, China

=== Selected group exhibitions ===
Year	Title	Location
2016	Chinese Whispers	Zentrum Paul Klee, Bern, Switzerland
2015	Fire and Forget. On Violence	Kunst-Werke Institute, Berlin, Germany
2013	Criss-Cross	Long Museum, Shanghai, China
2013	28 Chinese	Rubell Family Collection, Miami, US
2013	Inter-Vision. A Contemporary Exhibition Across The Strait	The National Art Museum of China, Beijing, China
2013	FUCK OFF II	Groninger Museum, Groninger, Netherland
2013	Inter-Vision. A Contemporary Exhibition Across The Strait	National Taiwan Museum of Fine Arts, Taiwan
2013	MEMO I	WHITE SPACE BEIJING, Beijing, China
2013	ON/OFF	Ullens Center for Contemporary Art, Beijing, China
2012	Get it louder	The Orange at Sanlitun Village, Beijing, China
2012	2012 Shanghai Sculpture Programme---Life Latitude	Shanghai Painting & Sculpture Institute, Shanghai, China
2012	Examples to follow! Expeditions in aesthetics and sustainability	Iberia Center for Contemporary Art, Beijing, China
2012	Maximalism in Contrasts	Hill Wood Art Museum, Long Island University, New York, US
2011	Shanshui – Poetry without Sound? Landscape in Chinese Contemporary Art	Kunstmuseum Luzern, Lucerne, Switzerland
2011	Artistes Chinois / Artistes Marseillais / Correspondances?	L'Alcazar Bibliothèque de Marseille, France
2011	DAS ICH IM ANDEREN	Mercator Foundation, Essen, Germany MIND
2011	SPACE: Maximalism in Contrasts	Frick Art Museum, University of Pittsburgh, US
2010	Reshaping History	Today art Museum, Beijing, China
2010	Exhibition of Asian Abstract Art	501 Art Gallery, Chongqing, China
2009	Indoor Service	Molang Art Space, Xi'an, China
2009	School of Image --Century Mind	Today Art Museum, Beijing, China
2009	Beautiful City	The International Art Exchange Center, Taipei, China
2008	Chinese Yong Artists Exhibition	Austria's Capital Shengboerteng St. City Hall, Austria
2007	The Modern Oil Painting Exhibition	Sangshan Museum, Shenzhen
