= Florian Slotawa =

German conceptual artist

Florian Slotawa (born 1972 in Rosenheim) is a German conceptual artist. Rather than creating new objects, Slotawa rearranges and recontextualizes what already exists.

== Solo exhibitions (selection) ==
- 2009 'Florian Slotawa' at P.S.1, New York
- 2008 Sies + Höke Galerie, Düsseldorf
  - "Solothurn, aussen", Kunstverein Solothurn
- 2007 "One After The Other", Arthouse, Austin, Texas
  - Galleria Suzy Shammah, Milan
  - Galerie Friedrich, Basel
- 2006 Modern Art, London
- 2005 "Land gewinnen", Haus am Waldsee, Berlin
  - Sies + Höke Galerie, Düsseldorf
  - Galerie Friedrich, Basel
- 2004 "Bonn ordnen", Bonner Kunstverein
  - VRIZA, Amsterdam
- 2003 Kunstmuseum Thun, Thun
- 2002 "Gesamtbesitz", Kunsthalle Mannheim
  - Sies + Höke Galerie, Düsseldorf
- 2001 "Schätze aus zwei Jahrtausenden", Museum Abteiberg Mönchengladbach
- 2000 Sies + Höke Galerie, Düsseldorf
- 1997 "Einrichtungsversuch", Private apartment, Munich
