= Stephen G. Rhodes =

American artist (born 1977)

Stephen G. Rhodes (born 1977) is an artist based in Los Angeles.

== Biography ==
Rhodes was born in Houston and raised in Louisiana. His work consists of multi-media installations which reference stories from American history. The work is often concerned with language and puns.

He received his MFA from Art Center College of Design, Pasadena, in 2005.

== Selected exhibitions ==
2007

- Ruined Dualisms, Overduin and Kite, Los Angeles
- Recurrency, Guild & Greyshkul, New York
- Galerie Christian Nagel, curated by Sterling Ruby, Berlin
- USA Today, The State Hermitage Museum, St. Petersburg, Russia (travelling)
- Between Two Deaths, curated by Ellen Blumenstein and Felix Ensslin. ZKM Center for the Arts and Media, Karlsruhe

2006

- Dualism #2, ArtRock, Rockefeller Center, New York, New York

2005

- LA Weekly Biennial, curated by Doug Harvey, Track 16,

Los Angeles

2004

- Faith, curated by Matthew Johnson, Champion Fine Art, Culver City, California

2001

- Entropy, curated by James Fuentes, Brooklyn, NY
- Wolf Songs for Lambs, curated by James Fuentes, The Space, New York
