= Bunny Rogers =

American artist

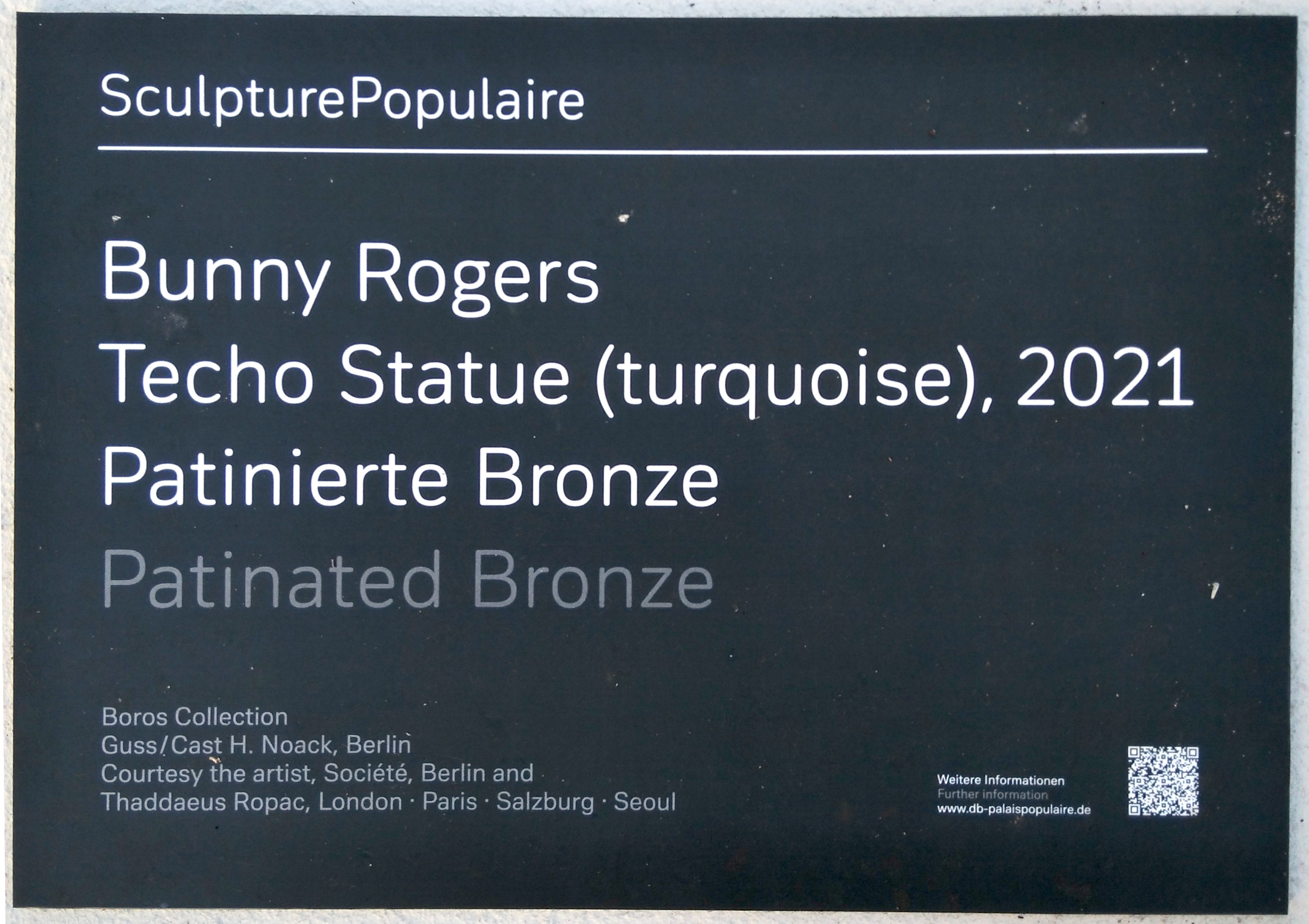
Bunny Rogers Sculpture

Bunny Rogers (born 1990) is an American artist known for her multimedia works that often explore themes of loneliness, nostalgia, and alienation through the use of digital and traditional media. Her works span a variety of formats, including sculpture, video, and installation.

== Career ==
Rogers' work is characterized by its engagement with personal and cultural trauma. She first gained attention with her works that utilize characters from her childhood.

One of Rogers' projects, 'Columbine Library,' consists of several multimedia installations, including 'Mandy’s Piano Solo in Columbine Cafeteria.' This installation features piano covers of several Elliott Smith songs This project delves into the themes of grief and remembrance, using the backdrop of the Columbine High School shooting to explore broader societal traumas.

In addition to "Columbine Library," Rogers also gained acclaim for her "Kind Kingdom" exhibition held at Kunsthaus Bregenz, exploring themes of isolation and community through installation and sculptural works. Her other exhibitions include solo shows at the Whitney Museum of American Art in New York, where her series "Brig Und Ladder" was featured. Rogers has participated in numerous group exhibitions where she blended digital technology with traditional artistic elements.

=== Exhibitions ===
- Whitney Museum of American Art, New York (2017)
- Museum of Modern Art, Warsaw (2019)
- Performa, New York (2019)
- Foundation Louis Vuitton, Paris (2020)
- Kunsthaus-Bregenz, Austria (2020)
- Boros Collection (2024)
