= Karl Bonatz =

German architect (1882–1951)

- Born: Karl Nikolaus Bonatz; 6 July 1882; Rappoltsweiler, German Empire
- Died: 24 September 1951 (aged 69); West Berlin, West Germany
- Occupation: Architect

Karl Nikolaus Bonatz (6 July 1882 – 24 September 1951) was a German architect, best known for designing Reichsbahnbunker Friedrichstraße, an air-raid shelter which was turned into an art gallery.

== Biography ==
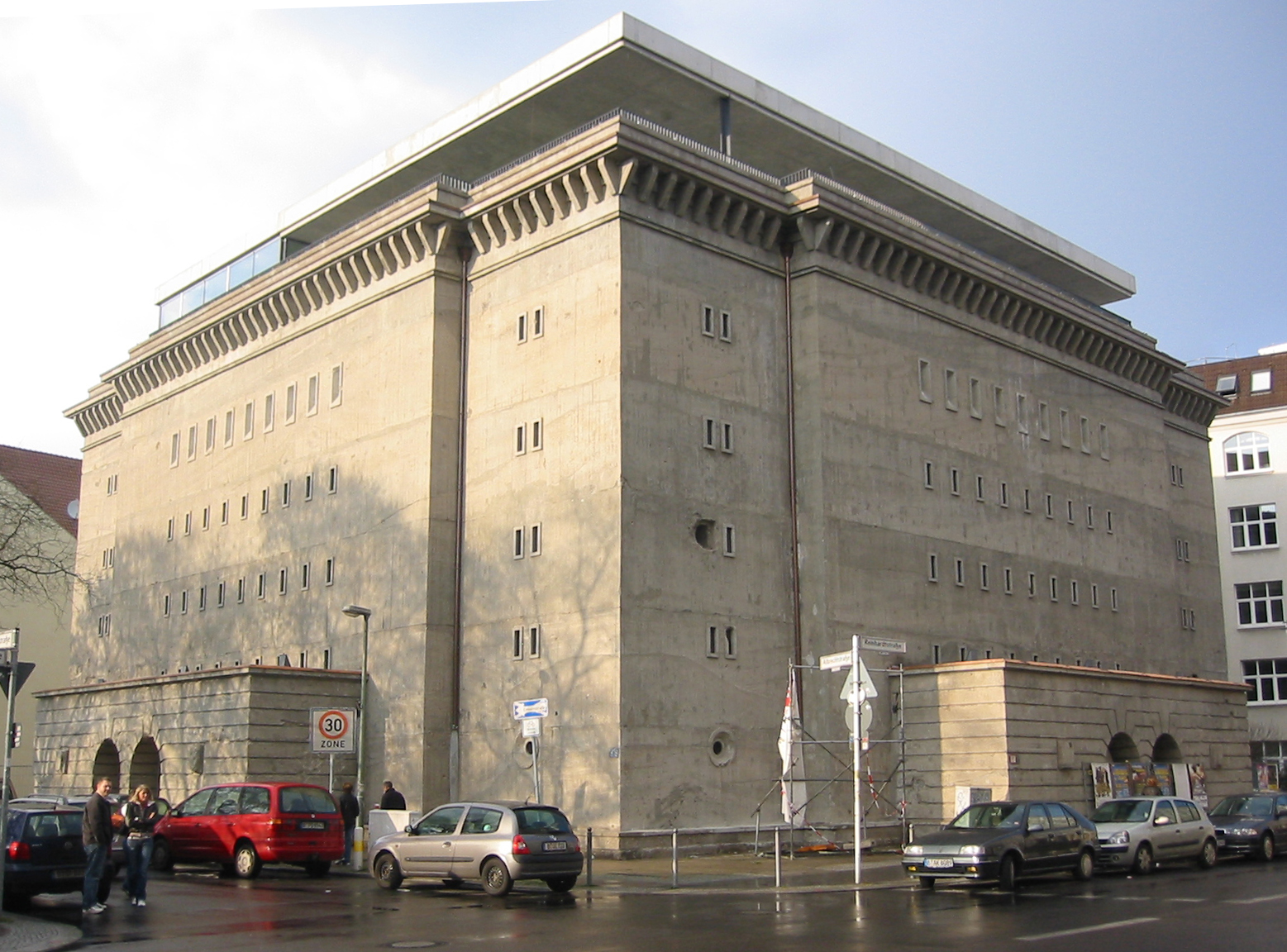
Reichsbahnbunker Friedrichstraße, the air-raid shelter which was turned into an art gallery.

Bonatz was the younger brother of fellow architect Paul Bonatz. The brothers presented a plan for modernising the Hôpital civil de Strasbourg and were commissioned by the city, their then hometown, to carry out the plans. After completing successively the clinic for epidemic diseases (1906), the general technical buildings (1909), the pediatric clinics (1910), the maternity clinic (1911), the neurological clinic (1912), the surgical clinic B, the medical clinic B, the radiological department and the baths (1914) Karl was recruited in 1915 to serve in World War One. Thereafter he returned to Strasbourg and in 1919 he opened an architectural firm of his own, before being expelled from France in 1921. After several stations, among others in Merseburg working in public service of the Province of Saxony he changed position and served as Magistratsoberbaurat, one of Berlin's several equally ranked high city officials for construction, between 1927 and 1937.

In 1940, Bonatz was employed by Albert Speer in his office of inspector general for constructions in Berlin. Bonatz designed several bunkers, among them the Reichsbahnbunker (railway bunker), built in Mitte, Berlin, that could house 3,000 people. Planning began in 1943, under the supervision of Speer.

Bonatz succeeded Hans Scharoun as chief planner of West Berlin. Both intended the reconstruction of the Berliner Schloss, which was later demolished by the socialist regime.
