= Kris Martin =

Belgian conceptual visual artist

Kris Martin (born 1972 in Kortrijk) is a Belgian conceptual visual artist. His work consists of monumental and small-scale sculptures, drawings and interventions.

Recurring themes in his work are the notion of time, history and the transience of human existence. His artwork also explores the relationship between the creators and the consumers of art, and combines elements of contemplation with humour and playfulness.

Among his best known works are 'Mandi XVIII', a plaster cast of the Laocoon group with the snakes omitted, and '100 years' a sculpture that will explode in 100 years from its conception. Martin has worked with curators Jan Hoet and Jens Hoffmann.

Martin held his first solo show in 2000. Since then he has mounted many solo exhibitions, and his work has been included in dozens of group exhibitions.

In 2020, a retrospective of Martin's work was held at S.M.A.K Ghent titled EXIT. The exhibition gathered many well known works amongst which the iconic Altar (2004), with recent additions such as Water (2020), a spread of vessels holding the life sustaining liquid.

== Solo shows ==
- 2000 - Wahnsinn, Garden of Museum Dhondt-Dhaenens, Deurle
- 2004 - Beaulieu Gallery, Wortegem-Petegem
- 2005 - Neuer Aachener Kunstverein, Aachen; Sies + Höke, Düsseldorf
- 2006 - Deus ex machina, Johann König, Berlin
- 2007 - MoMA PS1, New York; My Private 5, Piazza San Marco, Venedig; Sies + Höke, Düsseldorf; Marc Foxx, Los Angeles
- 2009 - Aspen Art Museum, Aspen; Sies + Höke, Düsseldorf; Johann König, Berlin
- 2010 - FESTUM, White Cube, London; T.Y.F.F.S.H., K20 Kunstsammlung Nordrhein-Westfalen, Düsseldorf; Almine Rech Gallery, Brüssel/Brussels
- 2011 - Sies + Höke, Düsseldorf; Marc Foxx, Los Angeles; The Magnificent Seven: Hammarby!, Wattis Institute for Contemporary Arts, San Francisco
- 2012 - Every Day of the Weak, Kestnergesellschaft, Hannover, Kunstmuseum Bonn, Aargauer Kunsthaus, Aarau; Mandi VIII, Lehmbruck-Museum, Duisburg; DO NOT CROSS THE RED LINE, Kunst-Station Sankt Peter, Köln; Festum II, Theseustempel, Kunsthistorisches Museum, Wien
- 2013 - Somebody, Sies + Höke, Düsseldorf; White Cube, London; Künstlerraum, K21 Kunstsammlung Nordrhein-Westfalen, Düsseldorf
- 2016 - König Galerie, Berlin.
- 2020 - EXIT, S.M.A.K, Ghent.
