= Robert Kuśmirowski =

Polish contemporary artist (born 1973)

Robert Kuśmirowski (born 1973) is a Polish contemporary artist whose work includes sculpture, installations, performance and photography. His work uses reconstruction of historical artefacts and settings to examine and manipulate historical themes. He lives and works in Lublin.

== Early life and education ==
Kuśmirowski was born in 1973 in Łódź.

He studied sculpture at the Maria Curie-Skłodowska University in Lublin including a year's scholarship at the University of Rennes 2. He graduated in 2003.

== Work ==
In his installations Kuśmirowski showcases his ability to craft replicas for illusionistic effects of decay and ageing, often bringing together found objects with elements constructed out of wood, cardboard, paint and other materials. Kuśmirowski had become interested in replication and falsification as a child when he forged bus passes and postage stamps for his family. This has remained a consistent theme in his work.

In 2003, he rode from Paris via Luxemburg to Leipzig on a 19th-century bicycle, dressed in period garb. He documented the tour by photographing it, and processed the prints so that they seem to be original photos from the time period. He presented the photographs in an exhibition space, along with an unusable reproduction of the bicycle and his own drawings, which were yellowed in order to simulate newspaper articles on the various stages of the tour. On 14 November 2004 Kusmirowski left Lodz and walked 1500 km on foot to Paris for the opening of the group exhibition "De ma Fenêtre, des artistes et leur territoire" - of which his action was a part - on 16 December.

In Double V (2005), he created a life-size replica of a 1970s worker’s flat in Soviet-era architecture. Wagon (2006), exhibited in the 4th Berlin Biennale, was modelled with styrofoam and cardboard after train carriages used to transport detainees to Auschwitz. At the New Museum in New York, Kuśmirowski constructed Unacabine (2008), a replica of the remote cabin in Montana where Polish-American terrorist Theodore Kaczynski conceived his mail bombing campaign against American universities, airlines and other companies. At the Barbican Centre in 2009, he transformed a gallery into a World War II-era concrete bunker – complete with flickering lights, hand-crafted nuts and bolts, and even a working draisine.

== Exhibitions ==
Kuśmirowski had his first solo exhibition while still a student (in 2002) at the Galeria Biała in Lublin, where he constructed a replica of the old railway station. He has since had solo shows, among others, at Stedelijk Van Abbemuseum, Eindhoven (2005), Migros Museum für Gegenwartskunst, Zürich (2006/07), and the Barbican Centre, London (2009).

Kuśmirowski's next exhibition was titled pain thing, at Summerhall (The Old Royal Dick Veterinary College) in Edinburgh during the Edinburgh Fringe 2012.

== Recognition ==
In 2004 he was nominated for a Paszport Polityki award.

== Major works ==
- 2006: Ornamente der Anatomie (The Ornaments of Anatomy), Kunstverein Hannover, Hamburg.
- 2006: Wagon, 4th Berlin Biennale, Berlin.
- 2008: Unacabine, New Museum of Contemporary Art, New York City.
- 2009: The Collector’s Massif, Bunkier Sztuki, Kraków.
- 2009: Bunker, Barbican Centre, London.
