= Bunkier Sztuki =

Art gallery in Kraków

Coordinates: 50.0636°N 19.9344°E

- Galeria Sztuki Współczesnej „Bunkier Sztuki”
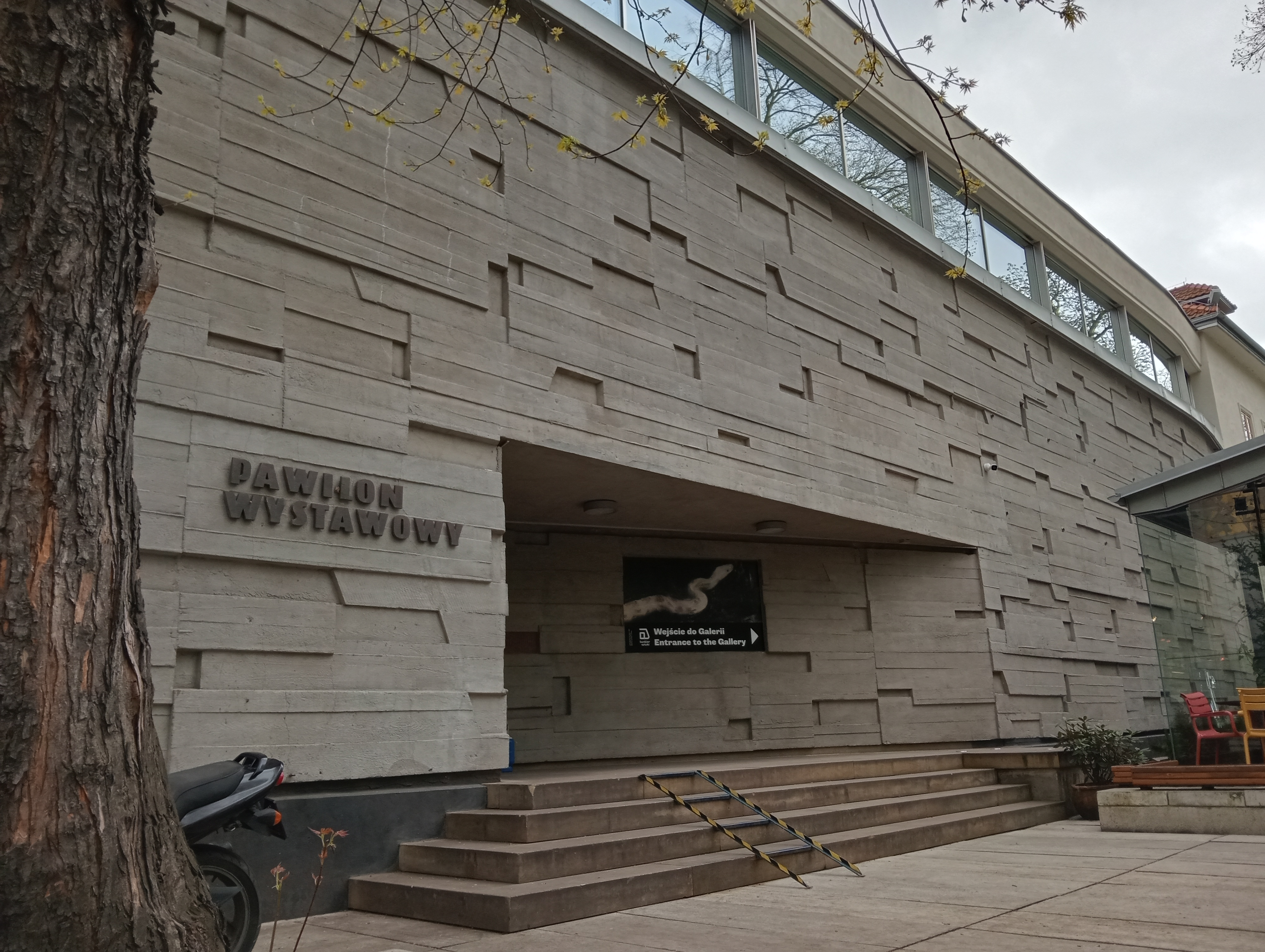
- Established: 1950
- Location: 3a Szczepański Square, Kraków
- Type: Contemporary art gallery
- Director: Delfina Jałowik
- Website: bunkier.art.pl

Bunkier Sztuki is a contemporary art gallery in Kraków, Poland.

== History ==
It was founded in 1950, as Kraków Branch of the Central Bureau for Art Exhibitions (Krakowski Oddział Centralnego Biura Wystaw Artystycznych). The building, that was constructed in 1965, was designed by Krystyna Tołłoczko-Różyska; the façade, made of concrete cast from wooden formwork, was designed by Stefan Borzęcki and Antoni Hajdecki.

Since the beginning of its existence, more than 980 exhibitions were held at the gallery. Bunkier's collection comprises 445 works by 170 artists. There is a cafe run outside the gallery.

== Directors ==
- Krzysztof Głuchowski (1995–1999)
- Jarosław Suchan (1999–2002)
- Maria Anna Potocka (2002–2010)
- Piotr Cypryański (2010–2014)
- Magdalena Ziółkowska (2014–2018)
- Maria Anna Potocka (2019–2024)
- Delfina Jałowik (from 2024)

== Bullying controversy ==
In July 2024, court ruled that the gallery's worker Lidia Krawczyk fell victim to workplace bullying by her employer.
