= Shenyang Normal University =

University in Shenyang, China

- Type: Public
- Established: 1951
- President: Hao Deyong
- Administrative staff: 1,400
- Students: 23,037
- Location: Shenyang, Liaoning, China
- Campus: Suburban
- Website: (Chinese) (English)

Shenyang Normal University (simplified Chinese: 沈阳师範大学; traditional Chinese: 瀋陽師範大學; pinyin: Shěnyáng Shīfàn Dàxué; SYNU) is a broad-based university in Shenyang, Liaoning Province, China under the provincial government.

== History ==
Shenyang Normal University was established in 1951, as Northeastern Education College. During its life the university has changed names a number of times, first to Shenyang Teacher's College in 1953, then to Liaoning First Teachers' College in 1965 and back to Shenyang Teacher's College in 1978. The current name dates from 2001 when the then Shenyang Teacher's College was merged with Liaoning Educational College. This college is a non-profit organization.

== Present ==
Shenyang Normal University comprises 18 colleges, divided into 30 departments, including the Liaoning Provincial Basic Education Teaching Research Training Center and College of Educational Science, the Science and Information Software College, the International Commercial College, the Information Technology College, the Foreign Language College, the College of Arts and Design and the Dramatic arts College. The various colleges and departments offer a total of 47 programs for students studying for a bachelor's degree and 31 for those studying towards a master's degree.

The university boasts a diverse number of research fields, and its research schools include the School of Human Resource Development and Administrative Science, the Research Institute of Educational Economy and Administration and the Research Institute of Entomological Science. In addition to the teaching of standard undergraduate course the university offers a number of course for part-time adult learners who wish to gain a master's degree and for overseas students.

== College of International Business (CIB) ==
In a partnership with Fort Hays State University in the United States, Shenyang Normal University opened up a new college called the College of International Business (CIB, 國際商學院). CIB is responsible for about half of the foreign teaching staff at the university. CIB has the most expensive tuition fees in the whole university.

CIB offers two different degree programs. One is the double-degree program through its FHSU partnership where students receive a degree from FHSU, and a degree from Shenyang Normal University. These students take courses from FHSU, delivered at the CIB building through mediating Cooperating Teachers, and they also take courses from the Chinese side of CIB.

The other program is the single-degree program where students take courses only from the Chinese side of CIB, and receive one degree, from Shenyang Normal University.

== Campus ==
Following the merger with Liaoning Educational College the university was moved from its previous urban location to a new campus in the northern suburbs of Shenyang. The university continues to use the address for Huanggu District (皇姑區) even though it is now on the border of Yuhong District (於洪區) and Shenbei District (瀋北新區). The new campus covers 300 acres (1.2 km^{2}) of land with 793,000 square meters of floor space. It occupies land that used to be part of three villages: North Sitaizi (北四臺子), Zhengliang (正良) and Guoqi (郭七).

The area, although far from being as developed as other older areas in Shenyang, is changing fast. For example, the old village of Zhengliang (正良) has been razed with no traces of the original, and a new development area called Xin Zheng Liang Cun (正良新村) will be built in the original village's place.

The new campus is home to the largest statue of Confucius.

The university's libraries hold over 1.5 million volumes.

== See also ==
- Fort Hays State University
