= Klara Lidén =

Swedish contemporary artist

- Born: 1979 (age 46–47); Stockholm, Sweden
- Education: Royal School of Technology, Stockholm; Berlin University of the Arts; Konstfack, Stockholm
- Known for: Installation, video performance

Klara Lidén (born 1979) is a contemporary artist. She currently lives and works in Berlin and New York City. Lidén is known for her installations and videos that respond to specific architectural environments.

== Early life and education ==
The younger of two sisters, Lidén grew up in suburban Stockholm. Her mother is a doctor, her father a biologist. She attended the School of Architecture, Royal Institute of Technology, Stockholm (2000–2004), the Berlin University of the Arts, Berlin (2003) and the University College of Arts Crafts and Design, Konstfack, Stockholm (2004–2007).

== Work ==
Lidén has, in past projects, built a house with discarded materials on the banks of a river, set up an alternative free postal system and fly-posted blank white posters over street advertisements. For her 2005 solo show at Reena Spaulings Fine Art in New York, she built, from scavenged cardboard boxes and thin iron pipes, a small tower with an elevated room in the storefront gallery; a combination playhouse, retreat and gallery within a gallery, the tower was made of the same material that the neighborhood's homeless people used for protection and bedding. In her 2007 exhibition at the Moderna Museet, she moved the entire contents of her apartment into a museum. At the Nordic pavilion at the 2009 Venice Biennale, assembled by fellow artists Elmgreen and Dragset, she created a fictional teenager's bedroom that offered an unusual form of escape – an emergency axe as well as a hole in the wall. For a 2012 at Reena Spaulings, she erected a blue wall across the gallery space with a door admitting visitors into a room filled with 80 used Christmas trees taken from the streets of the city.

Her Poster Paintings series, which she began in the late 2000s, consists of four-inch wads of advertisement posters glued together. These poster sediments come from Berlin, where they are a typical feature in the urban landscape; Lidén's sole addition is a white top sheet on this multilayered work.

Her short films capture the improvised performative actions that she undertakes in public urban spaces. In the final year at the Royal Institute of Technology in Stockholm, she was asked to give a lecture there about urban planning. Instead, she showed Paralyzed (2003), in which she danced provocatively to a musical soundtrack full of shrieking and hooting on a Stockholm commuter train. In her iconic The Myth of Progress (Moonwalk) (2008), the artist is seen moonwalking through the streets of Manhattan at night. Techno Battle (2012) is a collaborative video by Klara Lidén and her sister and fellow artist Hanna, in which the two women — one wearing what looks like a fencing uniform, and the other in a ghoulish mask, T-shirt, and jeans — face off and hurl bits of technology at each other, like a laptop computer, which shatters, and whose broken fragments they then stuff into a bonfire. In 2005, both sisters appeared on a new version of The Velvet Underground's album White Light/White Heat, recorded by artists recruited by artists collective Bernadette Corporation, among them Brian Degraw, Lizzi Bougatsos, Rita Ackermann, Jutta Koether, and Seth Price.

Lidén's photographic works also explore the urban space by placing the artist in direct contact with the fabrics of the city: she climbs down a manhole in Untitled (Down) (2011) and stands nonchalantly on a wooden post in a city port in Untitled (Pier) (2013).

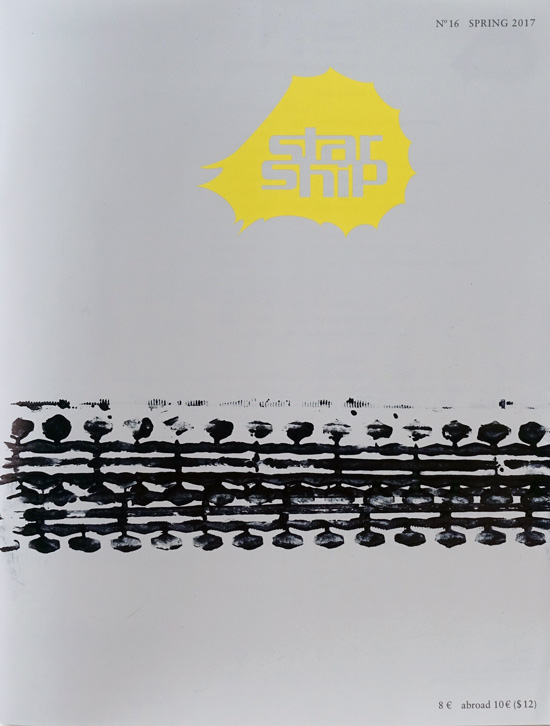
The cover page of Starship magazine, No.16, 2017, designed by Lidén

== Exhibitions ==
Lidén has exhibited her work and performed extensively worldwide since 2003. Venues for group exhibitions include the Urban Gallery, Berlin (2003), Art in General, New York, Stockholm Art-Fair (2004) and Outfest, Los Angeles (2005). Single exhibitions have since been held at Moderna Museet, Stockholm, Reena Spaulings Fine Art, New York, the Serpentine Galleries, London (2010), Galerie Neu, Berlin (2015), Le Consortium, Dijon (2015) and WIELS, Brussels (2015). The artist made her solo U.S. museum debut in the Museum of Modern Art’s Elaine Dannheisser Projects Series in 2009, where she created Project 89. In 2009, Lidén's work was presented as part of an exhibition in the Danish and Nordic Pavilions at the 53rd International Art Exhibition of the Venice Biennale and she received a special mention from the jury of the 54th Venice Biennale.

== Collections ==
Lidén's work resides in the collections of the Museum of Modern Art, New York; Moderna Museet, Stockholm; and the Astrup Fearnley Museet for Moderne Kunst, Oslo, Norway; among others.

== Recognition ==
- 2008 International Artist Studio Program in Stockholm (IASPIS)
- 2009 Foundation for Contemporary Arts Grants to Artists award
- 2010 blauorange Award
- 2010 International Artist-In-Residency programme, Artpace, San Antonio
- 2011 Special Mention, 54th Venice Biennale
- 2011 Preis der Nationalgalerie für junge Kunst

== Literature ==
- Sophie O'Brien (ed.), Klara Lidén (Ill.) et al.: Klara Lidén. Serpentine Gallery: Moderna Museet. Buchhandlung Walther Konig GmbH & Co. KG. Abt. Verlag, Cologne 2010, ISBN 978-3-86560-915-1.
- Christiane Rekade (ed.), Klara Lidén (Ill.) et al.: Klara Liden - Rumpfflächen und Plündererbanden. Kerber Christof Verlag, Bielefeld 2011, ISBN 978-3-86678-510-6.
- Heartney, Eleanor; Posner; Princenthal; Scott (2013) The Reckoning: Women Artists of the New Millennium, published by Prestel Verlag, pp. 142–147, ISBN 978-3-7913-4759-2
