= Elmgreen & Dragset =

Danish-Norwegian artist duo

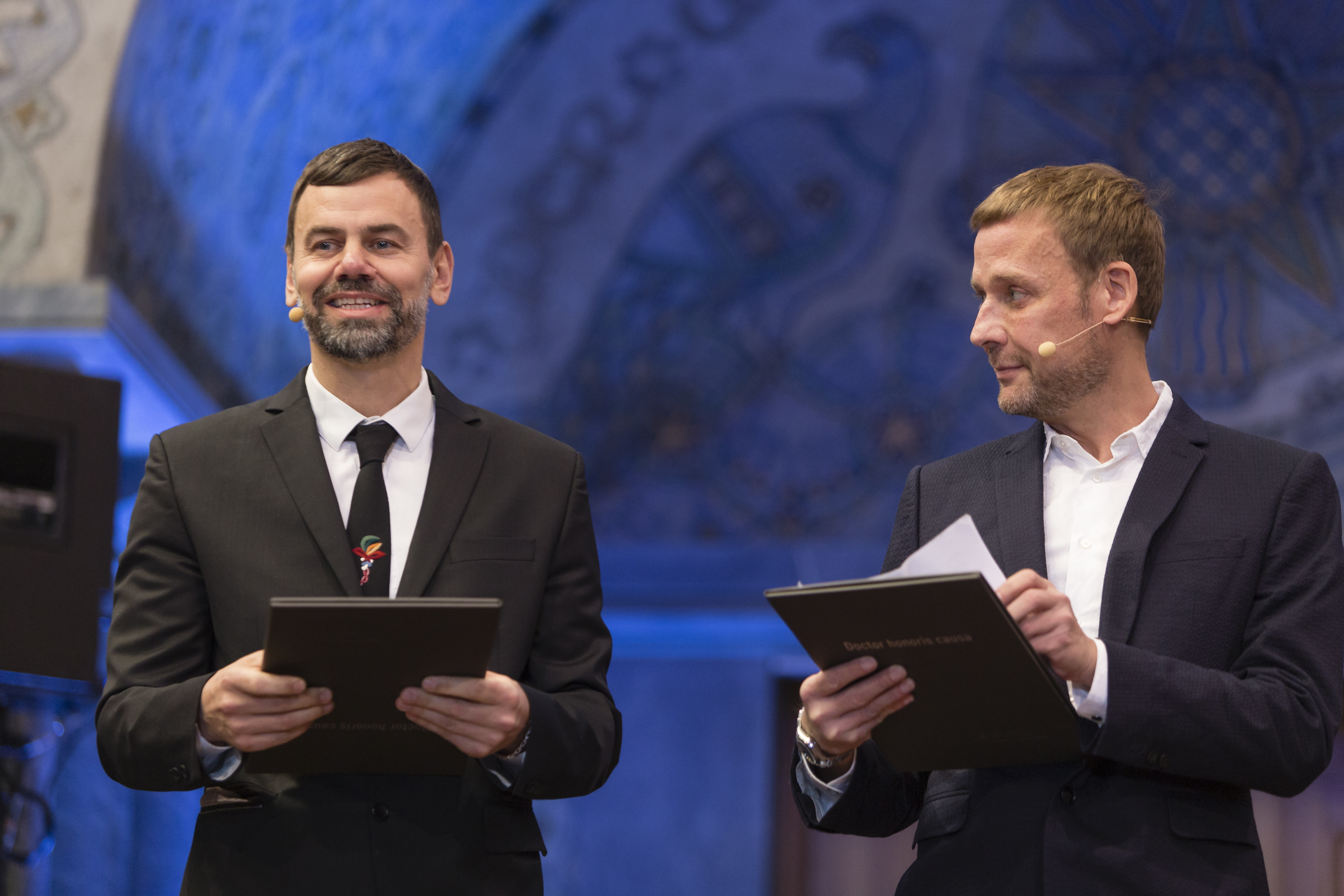
- 2015
- Born: Elmgreen (1961) and Dragset (1969)

Michael Elmgreen (born 1961) and Ingar Dragset (born 1969) are an artist duo making work known for its subversive humour and wit, while simultaneously addressing social and cultural concerns. They have been working together since 1995. They live and work in Berlin.

== Background ==
Michael Elmgreen was born in 1961 in Copenhagen, Denmark. Ingar Dragset was born in 1969 in Trondheim, Norway. They met in Copenhagen in 1994. At this time, Elmgreen, who was born in the city in 1961, was writing and performing poetry. Dragset, who was born in 1969 in Norway, was studying theatre.

In 1995, Elmgreen and Dragset started collaborating.

In 1997, they moved to Berlin. In 2006, the duo bought a large 1000m^{2} former water-pumping station (dating from 1924) in Berlin's Neukölln and converted it into a studio. In 2008, Elmgreen moved to London, and in 2015, he moved back to Berlin.

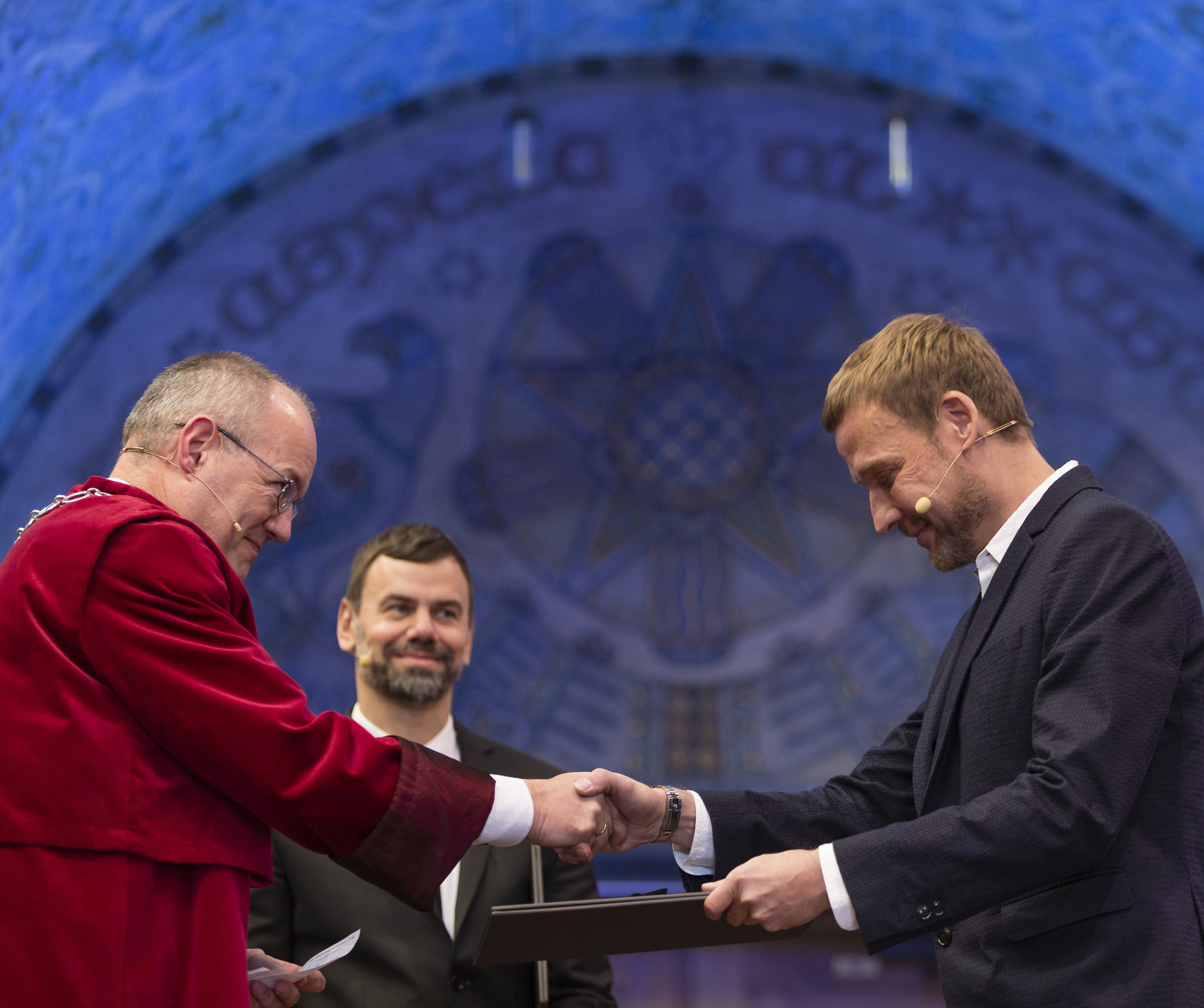
The artist duo Elmgreen & Dragset during the appointment of honorary doctorates at Norwegian University of Science and Technology (NTNU) in 2015

== Career ==
Since 1997, the artists have presented a great number of architectural and sculptural installations in an ongoing series of works entitled 'Powerless Structures' in which they transformed the conventions of the 'white cube' gallery space, creating galleries suspended from the ceiling, sunk into the ground or turned upside down. For the Istanbul Biennial in 2001, they constructed a full-scale model of a typical Modernist Kunsthalle descending into the ground while located outdoors among ancient ruins. Their work has also been shown in the Berlin, Istanbul, Liverpool, Moscow, São Paulo, Singapore, Gwangju Biennials.

Further exhibitions include transforming the Bohen Foundation in New York into a 13th Street Subway Station in 2004; their best-known project Prada Marfa, a Prada boutique inaugurated in 2005 and sited in the middle of the Texan desert; and their exhibition The Welfare Show in 2005–2006 at Serpentine Gallery, London / The Power Plant, Toronto / Bergen Kunsthall, Norway / BAWAG Foundation, Vienna, which was critically acclaimed.

For the 53rd Venice Biennale in 2009 they curated the exhibition The Collectors in the neighbouring Danish and Nordic Pavilions (which include Norway, Sweden, and Denmark), an unprecedented merging of two international exhibition venues. For their show, they invited fellow artists Maurizio Cattelan, Tom of Finland, Han & Him, Laura Horelli, William E. Jones, Terence Koh, Klara Lidén, Jonathan Monk, Nico Muhly, Norway Says, Vibeke Slyngstad, Thora Dolven Balke, Nina Saunders, and Wolfgang Tillmans, among others.

In 2011, their sculpture Powerless Structures, Fig. 101 was chosen as the winner of the Fourth Plinth Commission to be displayed on the Fourth plinth of London's Trafalgar Square. Their bronze sculpture of a boy astride a rocking horse questions the tradition for war monuments to celebrate either victory or defeat. The work is now permanently installed outside the Arken Museum of Modern Art.

In 2013, they curated an extensive public art program in Munich entitled “A Space Called Public/Hoffentlich Öffentlich” and transformed the former textile galleries of the V & A Museum into the grand family home of fictional architect Norman Swann. Their exhibition series “Biography” took place in 2014–2015 at the Astrup Fearnley Museet, Oslo and the SMK–National Gallery of Denmark, Copenhagen. In 2015 their exhibition “Aéroport Mille Plateaux” turned the PLATEAU Samsung Museum of Art in Seoul into an airport inspired by the ideas of philosopher Gilles Deleuze.

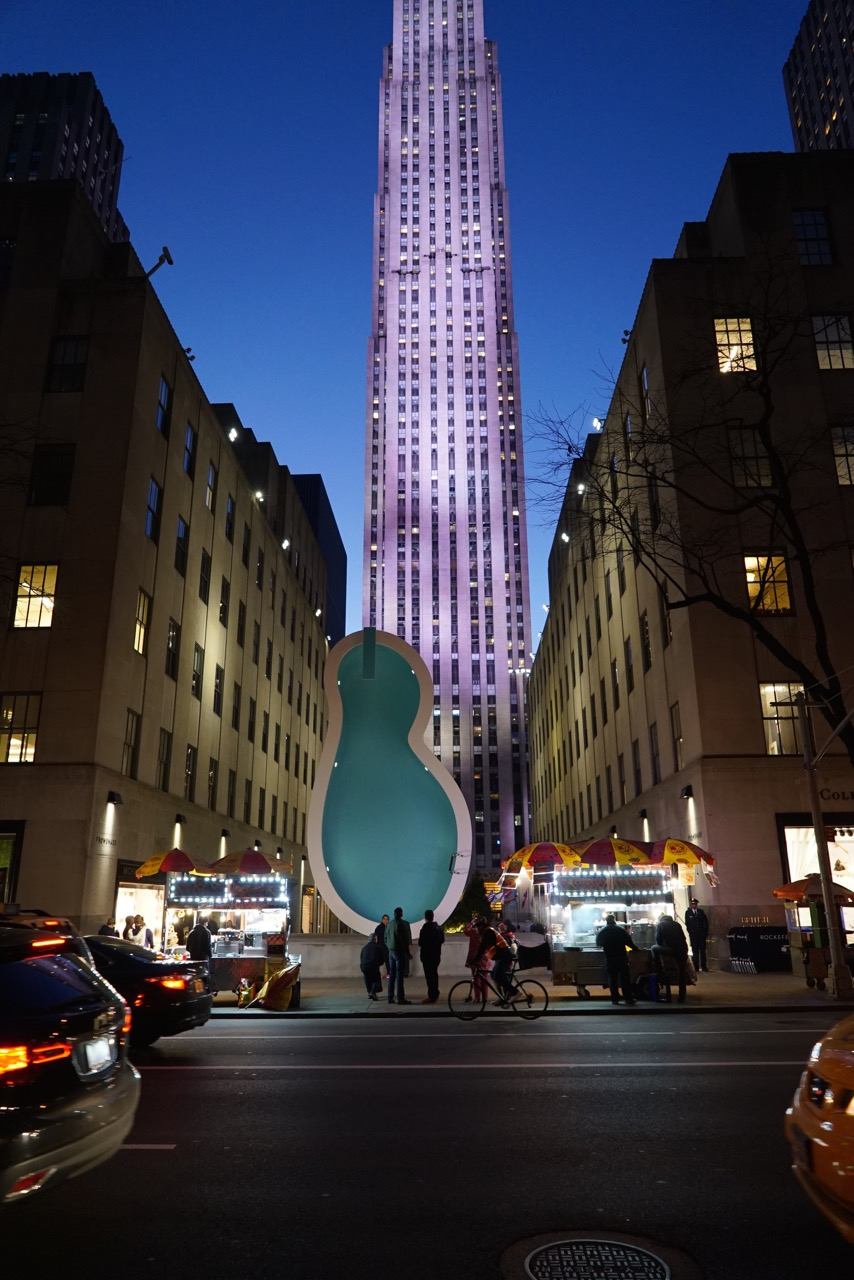
Van Gogh's Ear, 2016, in New York City's Rockefeller Center

For their solo exhibition “The Well Fair” in 2016, the duo transformed the Ullens Center for Contemporary Art in Beijing into a fictional art fair. Also in 2016, the artists installed Van Gogh's Ear at Rockefeller Center in New York; the 9-meter (30-foot) high, empty swimming pool stands upright on its shortest side.

The artists’ first major overview in the UK, This is How We Bite Our Tongue was held at the Whitechapel Gallery, London, in 2018. The exhibition consisted of a large-scale site-specific installation and a survey of their sculptural works. The Whitechapel Pool, realised specifically for the show, transformed the ground floor of the gallery into an abandoned public swimming pool fictionally dated to 1901 and related to the gentrification of the East End of London.

In 2019, Elmgreen & Dragset held their first major solo exhibition in the United States: "Sculptures" at the Nasher Sculpture Center in Dallas. Later that year, they installed a new public sculpture, "Bent Pool", located in Miami Beach's Pride Park, which takes the shape of a large swimming pool arching backwards to form an inverted U shape.

In Finland, the artist duo transformed the premises of EMMA – Espoo Museum of Art, into a surreal carpark environment for their exhibition "2020", which coincided with the 25th year of Elmgreen & Dragset's collaboration. Later that year, "The Hive" was inaugurated at the new Moynihan Hall Train Hall in Penn Station, New York. Suspended from the ceiling, "The Hive" is an upside-down, fictional cityscape illuminated by lights that will hang permanently above the 31st Street Mid-block Entrance Hall in New York City.

The following year, the Princess Estelle Cultural Foundation invited Elmgreen & Dragset to create a public sculpture for the Royal Djurgården Parks in Stockholm. "Life Rings", a towering sculpture made up of interlocking, stainless steel life rings, now stands at 7.5 meters (25 ft) high by the waterside of the public park. In 2021, the artists also received the 14th Robert Jacobsen Prize from the Würth Foundation, in Künzelsau, Germany. To celebrate the award a solo exhibition was held at the collection's Würth Museum 2 in Künzelsau.

Elmgreen & Dragset's 2022 exhibition "Useless Bodies?" was held at Fondazione Prada in Milan. Spanning more than 3,000 square meters, the exhibition drew focus to the status of the human body in today's digitally saturated, post-industrial world, looking at our working conditions, living modes and the health and leisure industries. In 2022, the artist duo will open their forthcoming exhibition "After Dark" at By Art Matters Museum in Hangzhou, China.

In 2015, the duo were awarded an honorary doctorate by the Norwegian University of Science and Technology (NTNU)

=== Permanent installations ===
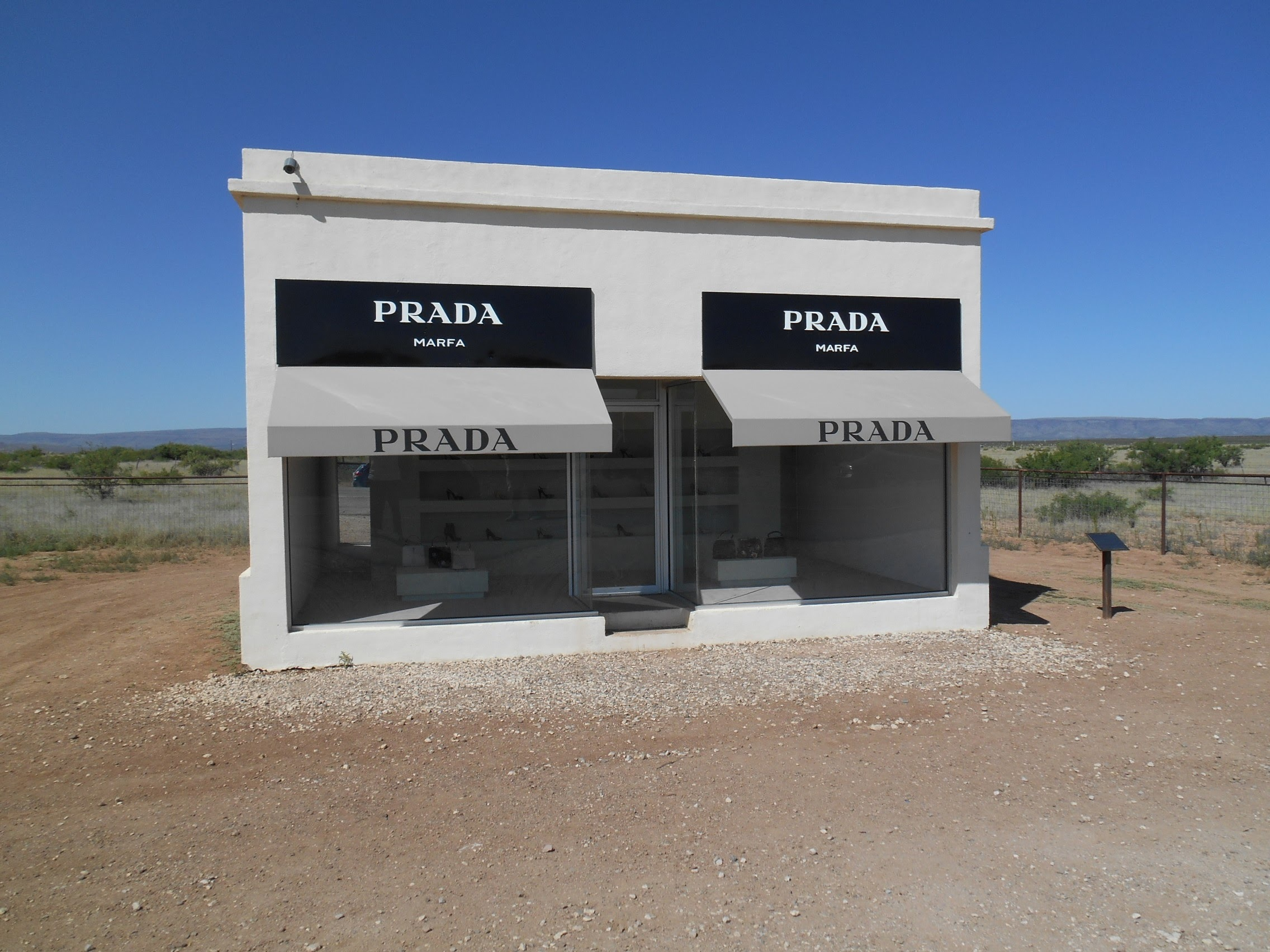
Prada Marfa, 2005, in Marfa, Texas

In 2003, Elmgreen & Dragset won the German Government's competition for a memorial in Tiergarten park in Berlin, in memory of the gay victims of the Nazi regime, which was unveiled in May 2008.

Several of their sculptures are now permanently installed for the public including their commission for the Fourth plinth, now outside the Arken Museum of Modern Art; Prada Marfa (2005), on the U.S. Highway 90 in Texas; Dilemma, a site-specific sculpture of a boy on a high diving board overlooking a fjord on the outskirts of Oslo and Han, a polished steel sculpture of a young man on a rock located in the centre of the harbor in Helsingør, Denmark. Han was installed in 2012 and is based on Edvard Eriksen's famous The Little Mermaid (statue). The figure sits in a similar pose, challenging conventional portrayals of masculinity.

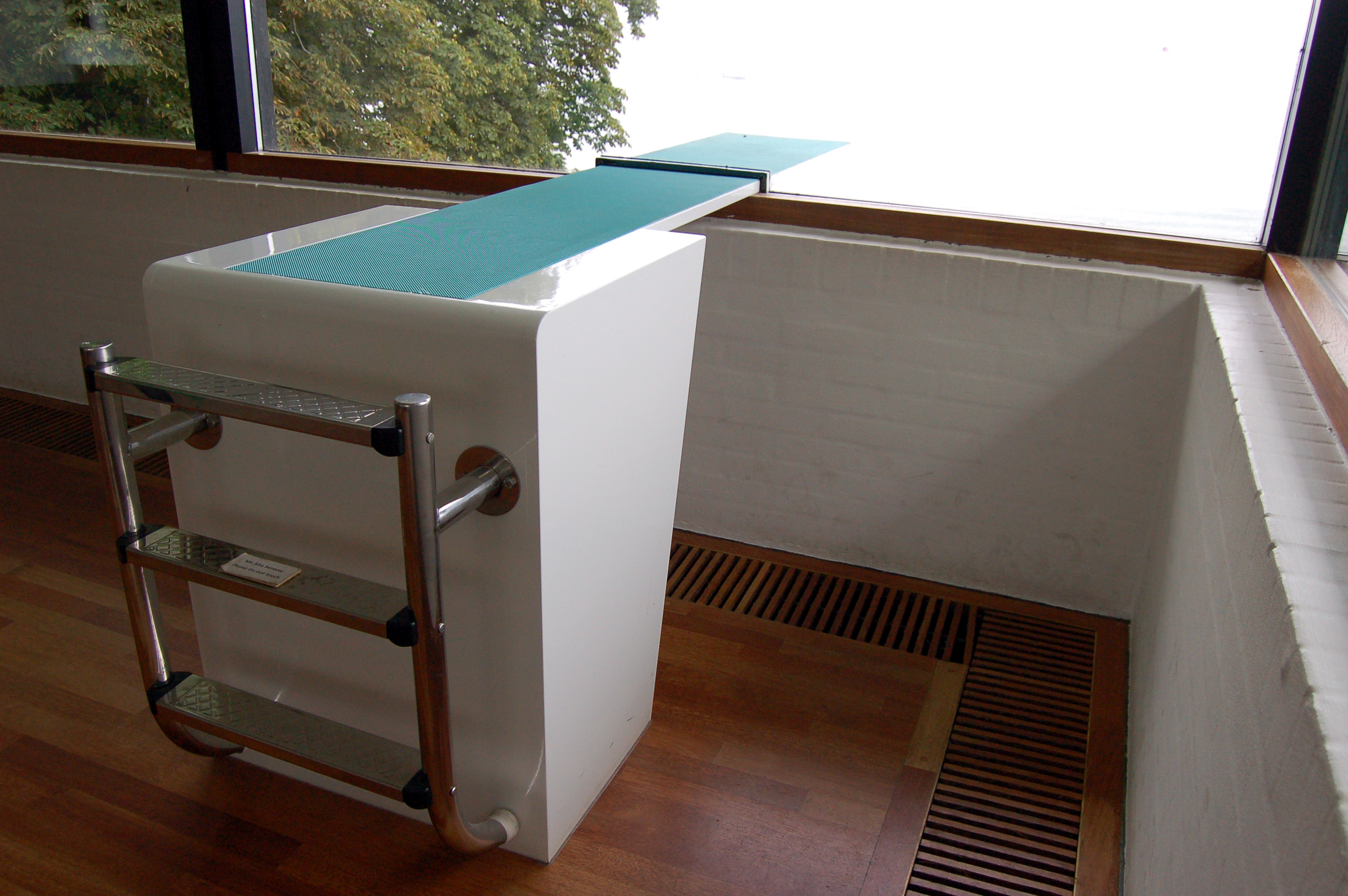
Powerless Structures, Fig. 11, 1997 at the Louisiana Museum of Modern Art in Humlebæk, Denmark.

In 2012 Elmgreen & Dragset were also selected for London's Fourth Plinth Commission in Trafalgar Square, where they created Powerless Structures, Fig. 101. Since then, Elmgreen & Dragset have created: Van Gogh's Ear, first presented by Public Art Fund at the Rockefeller Center in 2016 and since exhibited with K11 Musea in Hong Kong and Wuhan; Bent Pool (2019) in Pride Park, Miami Beach; The Hive (2020) at Moynihan Train Hall in Penn Station, New York; and most recently, Life Rings at Royal Djurgården, Stockholm (2021).

=== Performative works ===
In 2007, Elmgreen & Dragset developed Drama Queens, a theatre play about 20th-century art history with six remote-controlled versions of iconic sculptures, for Skulptur Projekte Münster. During the 2008 Frieze Art Fair, they staged Drama Queens, this time enlivened by the voices of leading stage stars such as Jeremy Irons and Joseph Fiennes, at The Old Vic in London.

== Other activities ==
In 2019, Dragset was a member of the jury that chose Lawrence Abu Hamdan for the Edvard Munch Art Award.

== Awards ==
Year	Outcome	Award	Body	Notes	Ref
2000	Nominated	Hugo Boss Prize			
2002		Preis der Nationalgalerie	Hamburger Bahnhof		
2006		Arken Art Prize			
2009	Special Mention		Venice Biennale	For The Collectors	
2009		Art Critics’ Prize (Kritikerlaget)	Norwegian Critics’ Association	For The Collectors	
2012		Eckersberg Medal			
2012		Carl Nielsen and Anne Marie Carl-Nielsen Grant		With an exhibition at Den Frie, Copenhagen	
2020		The B.Z.-Kulturpreis			
2021		Robert Jacobsen Prize	Würth Foundation		
2022		Established Artists Award	Soho House		
2022		Fondet Prize	Ny Carlsberg Glypotek		

== Art market ==
Elmgreen & Dragset are represented by Pace Gallery (since 2020), Helga de Alvear, Kukje Gallery, Massimo De Carlo, Victoria Miro Gallery, Galleri Nicolai Wallner, Perrotin, and Taka Ishii Gallery. They previously worked with Johann König until 2022.

== Exhibitions ==
=== Solo ===
Year	Title	Institution	Location	Country	Notes	Ref
1997	Powerless Structures	Galleri Campbells	Copenhagen	Denmark		
1997	Twelve Hours of White Paint/Powerless Structures, Fig. 15	Galleri Tommy Lund	Odense	Denmark		
1998	Dug Down Gallery / Powerless Structures, Fig. 45	Galleri i8 & Reykjavik Art Museum	Reykjavík	Iceland		
1999		Galleri Nicolai Wallner	Copenhagen	Denmark		
1999	Powerless Structures, Fig. 57-60	The Project	New York	United States		
2000		Roslyn Oxley9 Gallery	Sydney	Australia		
2000	Zwischen anderen Ereignissen	Galerie für Zeitgenössische Kunst Leipzig	Leipzig	Germany		
2001	Taking Place	Kunsthalle Zürich	Zurich	Switzerland		
2001	Opening Soon	Tanya Bonakdar Gallery	New York	United States		
2001	A Room Defined by its Accessibility	Statens Museum for Kunst	Copenhagen	Denmark		
2001		Galleri Nicolai Wallner	Copenhagen	Denmark		
2001	Linienstrasse 160	Klosterfelde	Berlin	Germany		
2001	Powerless Structures, Fig. 111	Portikus	Frankfurt	Germany		
2002	How are You Today	Galleria Massimo de Carlo	Milan	Italy		
2002	Powerless Structures, Fig. 229	Galeria Helga de Alvear	Madrid	Spain		
2002	Museum	Sala Montcada/Fundacio La Caixa	Barcelona	Spain		
2002	Suspended Space	Taka Ishii Gallery	Tokyo	Japan		
2002	CGAC		Santiago de Compostela	Spain		
2003	Paris diaries	Galerie Emmanuel Perrotin	Paris	France		
2003	Phone Home	Tanya Bonakdar Gallery	New York	United States		
2003	Short Cut	Nicola Trussardi Foundation	Milan	Italy		
2003	Spaced out	Portikus	Frankfurt	Germany		
2003	Please, Keep Quiet	Galleri Nicolai Wallner	Copenhagen	Denmark		
2003	Constructed Catastrophes, Fig. 2	CCA	Kitakyushu	Japan		
2003	Don't leave me this way	Galerie Emmanuel Perrotin	Paris	France		
2004	Intervention 37	Sprengel Museum	Hanover	Germany		
2004	Blocking The View	Tate Modern	London	United Kingdom		
2004	Moving Energies– Aspekte der Sammlung Olbricht: Michael Elmgreen & Ingar Dragset	Museum Folkwang	Essen	Germany		
2005	Prada Marfa	Art Production Fund/Ballroom Marfa	Marfa	United States		
2005	The Brightness of Shady Lives	Galeria Helga de Alvear	Madrid	Spain		
2005	The Welfare Show	Bergen Kunsthall	Bergen	Norway		
2005	The Welfare Show	BAWAG Foundation	Vienna	Austria		
2005	Forgotten Baby	Wrong Gallery	New York	United States		
2005	End Station	Bohen Foundation	New York	United States		
2005	Linienstrasse 160, Neue Mitte	Klosterfelde	Berlin	Germany		
2006	The Welfare Show	Serpentine Gallery	London	United Kingdom		
2006	The Welfare Show	The Power Plant	Toronto	Canada		
2006	Disgrace	Galerie Emmanuel Perrotin	Miami	United States		
2006	The Incidental Self	Taka Ishii Gallery	Tokyo	Japan		
2006	Would You Like Your Eggs A Little Different This Morning?	Galleria Massimo De Carlo	Milan	Italy		
2007	This is the first day of my life	Malmö Konsthall	Malmö	Sweden		
2007	Ti sto pensando	Villa Manin, Centre for Contemporary Art	Passariano	Italy		
2007	A Change Of Mind	Kunst am Bauzaun, Museion Bozen		Italy		
2008	Too Late	Victoria Miro Gallery	London	United Kingdom		
2008	Drama Queens	Old Vic Theatre	London	United Kingdom		
2008	Home is the Place You Left	Trondheim Kunstmuseum	Trondheim	Norway		
2008	Gedenkort für die im Nazionalsozialismus verfolgten Homosexuellen		Berlin	Germany		
2008	Side Effects	Galerie Emmanuel Perrotin	Paris	France		
2009	The Collectors, The Danish and Nordic Pavilions	53rd Venice Biennale	Venice	Italy		
2009	Drama Queens	Centre Pompidou	Paris	France		
2009	Trying to Remember What We Once Wanted to Forget	MUSAC	León	Spain		
2010	Celebrity: The One & The Many	ZKM, Center for Art and Media	Karlsruhe	Germany		
2011	Happy Days in the Art World, Performa 11		New York	United States		
2011	Happy Days in the Art World, Performa 11	Tramway	Glasgow	United Kingdom		
2011	The One & The Many	Boijmans Van Beuningen Museum	Rotterdam	Netherlands		
2011	Amigos	Galería Helga de Alvear	Madrid	Spain		
2011	The Afterlife of the Mysterious Mr. B	Galerie Emmanuel Perrotin	Paris	France		
2011	Elmgreen & Dragset	Thorvaldsen Museum	Copenhagen	Denmark		
2011	It's Never Too Late to Say Sorry	Sculpture International Rotterdam	Rotterdam	Netherlands		
2011	Silent wishes and broken dreams	Bayerische Staatsoper	Munich	Germany		
2012	Harvest	Victoria Miro Gallery	London	United Kingdom		
2012	Powerless Structures, Fig. 101	The Fourth Plinth, Trafalgar Square	London	United Kingdom		
2013	Tomorrow	Victoria and Albert Museum	London	United Kingdom		
2013	A Space Called Public		Munich	Germany	Curated by Elmgreen & Dragset	
2014	Biography	National Gallery of Denmark	Copenhagen	Denmark		
2014	Biography	Astrup Fearnley Museet	Oslo	Norway		
2014	The Old World	Galerie Perrotin	Hong Kong	China		
2015	Aéroport Mille Plateaux, PLATEAU	Samsung Museum of Art	Seoul	South Korea		
2015	Self-Portraits	Victoria Miro Gallery	London	United Kingdom		
2015	Stigma	Galleria Massimo De Carlo	London	United Kingdom		
2015	Stigma	Galleria Massimo De Carlo	Milan	Italy		
2015	Lot	Galería Helga de Alvear	Madrid	Spain		
2015	Past Tomorrow	Galerie Perrotin	New York	United States		
2016	The Well Fair	Ullens Center for Contemporary Art	Beijing	China		
2016	Van Gogh's Ear	Rockefeller Center	New York	United States		
2016	Powerless Structures	Tel Aviv Museum of Art	Tel Aviv	Israel		
2016	Elmgreen & Dragset	Grand Palais	Paris	France		
2016	Changing Subjects	The FLAG Art Foundation	New York	United States		
2017	Die Zugezogenen	Museum Haus Lange, Kunstmuseen Krefeld	Krefeld	Germany		
2017	Dilemma	Ekebergparken	Oslo	Norway		
2018	This Is How We Bite Our Tongue	Whitechapel Gallery	London	United Kingdom		
2018	To Whom It May Concern	FIAC Hors les Murs, Place Vendôme	Paris	France		
2018	Elmgreen & Dragset	Galerie Perrotin	Paris	France		
2018	We Are Not Ourselves	Cristina Guerra Contemporary Art	Lisbon	Portugal		
2019	Sculptures	Nasher Sculpture Center	Dallas	United States		
2019	It's Not What You Think	Blueproject Foundation	Barcelona	Spain		
2019	Adaptations	Kukje Gallery	Seoul	South Korea		
2019	Overheated	Massimo De Carlo	Hong Kong	China		
2020	2020	Espoo Museum of Modern Art	Espoo	Finland		
2020	Short Story	König Gallery	Berlin	Germany		
2020	Pool, No. 8,		Seoul	South Korea		
2020	Elmgreen & Dragset	Pace Gallery	East Hamptons	United States		
2021	The Nervous System	Pace Gallery	New York	United States		
	New Tenants	Perrotin	Paris	France		
	Elmgreen & Dragset	Würth Museum 2	Künzelsau	Germany		
	Life Rings	Princess Estelle Foundation, Royal Djurgårten	Stockholm	Sweden		
	Short Story	Copenhagen Contemporary	Copenhagen	Denmark		
2022	Useless Bodies?	Fondazione Prada	Milan	Italy		
	Stand By Me	Massimo de Carlo Pièce Unique	Paris	France		
	After Dark	By Art Matters Museum	Hanghzhou	China		
2023	Bonne Chance	Centre Pompidou-Metz		France		
2023	READ	Kunsthalle Praha		Czech Republic		

=== Public artworks ===
Years	Title	Institution	Location	Country	Notes	Ref
2012–present	Han	Kulturværftet Helsingør		Denmark	Permanent	

=== Group ===
Years	Title	Institution	Location	Country	Notes	Ref
2010	Fourth Plinth Commission, Six new proposals	The Foyer, St Martin-in-the-Fields	London	United Kingdom		
2011	Untitled	12th Istanbul Biennial	Istanbul	Turkey		
2011	You Are Not Alone	Joan Miró Foundation	Barcelona	Spain		
2012	Nude Men	Leopold Museum	Vienna	Austria		
2012	Common Ground	Public Art Fund	New York	United States		
2012		Liverpool Biennial	Liverpool	United Kingdom		
2012	TRACK – A contemporary city conversation	S.M.A.K., the Museum of Contemporary Art	Ghent	Belgium		
2013	Mom, am I barbarian?	13th Istanbul Biennial	Istanbul	Turkey		
2013	auf Zeit	Staatliche Kunsthalle Baden-Baden	Baden-Baden	Germany		
2014	Power Memory People – Memorials of Today	KØS Museum of Art in Public Spaces	Køge	Denmark		
2014	GOLD	Bass Museum of Art	Miami	United States		
2014	do it Moscow	Independent Curators International, Garage Museum of Contemporary Art	Moscow	Russia		
2014	Man in the Mirror	Vanhaerents Art Collection	Brussels	Belgium		
2014	Attention Economy	Kunsthalle Wien	Vienna	Austria		
2014	Do Not Disturb	Gerhardsen Gerner Gallery	Oslo	Norway		
2014	LOVE AIDS RIOT SEX II, Art Aids Activism from 1995 until today	Neue Gesellschaft für bildende Kunst (NBGK)	Berlin	Germany		
2015	What We Call Love, From Surrealism to Now	Irish Museum of Modern Art	Dublin	Ireland	Performance	
2015	Man in the Mirror	Vanhaerents Art Collection	Brussels	Belgium		
2015	Poor Art–Rich Legacy. Arte Povera and parallel practices 1968–2015	Museum of Contemporary Art	Oslo	Norway		
2015	Slip of the Tongue	Punta Della Dogana	Venice	Italy		
2015	Panorama	High Line Art	New York	United States		
2015	Infinite Experience	Museo de Arte Latinoamericano de Buenos Aires (MALBA)	Buenos Aires	Argentina		
2015	Days push off into nights	Spring Workshop	Hong Kong	China		
2015	All the World's a Stage. Works from the Goetz Collection	Fundación Banco Santander	Madrid	Spain		
2015	No Hablaremos de Picasso	Palacio Municipal Kiosko Alfonso	A Coruña	Spain		
2015	more Konzeption Conception now	Morsbroich Museum		Germany		
2016	The Others	König Galerie	Berlin	Germany		
2016	Staged! Spectacle and Role Playing in Contemporary Art	Kunsthalle München	Munich	Germany		
2016	Animality	Marian Goodman Gallery	London	United Kingdom		
2016	Protest	Victoria Miro Gallery	London	United Kingdom		
2016	Moved	Taka Ishii Gallery	Tokyo	Japan		
2016	No Man is an Island – The Satanic Verses	ARoS Aarhus Kunstmuseum	Aarhus	Denmark		
2016	ta.bu	Maison Particulière Art Center	Brussels	Belgium		
2017	WAITING. Between Power and Possibility	Hamburger Kunsthalle	Hamburg	Germany		
2017	Kuss. Von Rodin bis Bob Dylan	Bröhan Museum	Berlin	Germany		
2017	Physical Mind Restless Hands	Galerie Micky Schubert	Berlin	Germany		
2017	Die Schönheit im Anderen/The Beauty of Difference	Schloss Lieberose	Lieberose	Germany		
2017	Meet me in Heaven	Schloss Tüßling	Tüßling	Germany		
2017	No Place Like Home	Israel Museum	Jerusalem	Israel		
2017	Cool, Calm and Collected	ARoS Aarhus Kunstmuseum	Aarhus	Denmark		
2017	THE GARDEN: End of Time; Beginning of Time	ARoS Aarhus Kunstmuseum	Aarhus	Denmark		
2017	Commissions from Performa's Archives	Whitechapel Gallery	London	United Kingdom		
2017	OVER THE RAINBOW	Praz Delavallade	Los Angeles	United States		
2017	The Beguiling Siren is Thy Crest	Museum of Modern Art	Warsaw	Poland		
2018	Like Life: Sculpture, Color, and the Body	The Met Breuer	New York	United States		
2018	It's Never Too Late To Say Sorry	Aspen Museum of Art	Aspen	United States		
2018	Beyond Bliss	Bangkok Art Biennial	Bangkok	Thailand		
2018	Soziale Fassaden	MMK	Frankfurt	Germany		
2018	Minimalism: Space. Light. Object.	National Gallery Singapore		Singapore		
2018	Far From Home	ARoS Aarhus Kunstmuseum	Aarhus	Denmark		
2018	No Place Like Home	Museu Coleção Berardo	Lisbon	Portugal		
2018	Zeitspuren – The Power of Now	Kunsthaus Centre d'Art Pasquart	Biel/Bienne	Switzerland		
2018	Talk Show Festival	La Panacée MoCo	Montpellier	France		
2018	Ngorongoro II		Berlin	Germany		
2019	Blickachsen 12	Bad Homburg		Germany		
2019	Political Affairs – Language is not innocent	Kunstverein in Hamburg	Hamburg	Germany		
2019	There I Belong. Hammershøi by Elmgreen & Dragset	Statens Museum fur Kunst	Copenhagen	Denmark		
2019	Art & Porn	ARoS Aarhus Kunstmuseum	Aarhus	Denmark		
2019	Art & Porn	Kunsthal Charlottenborg	Copenhagen	Denmark		
2019	Sculpture Milwaukee		Wisconsin	United States		
2019	Art's Biggest Stage: Collecting the Venice Biennale 2007-2019	Clark Art Institute	Massachusetts	United States		
2019	A Cool Breeze	Galerie Rudolfinium	Prague	Czech Republic		
2019	Grand Hotel Abyss	steirischerherbst'19	Graz	Austria		
2019	Schöne Sentimenten	Museum Dhondt-Dhaenens	Sint-Martens-Latem	Belgium		
2019	La Source	Villa Carmignac	Porquerolles	France		
2019	Tainted Love	Villa Arson	Nice	France		
2020	WANTED!	Grand Palais	Paris	France		
2020	Mythologies – The Beginning and End of Civilisations	ARoS Triennal, ARoS Aarhus Art Museum	Aarhus	Denmark		
2020	Animals in Art	ARKEN Museum for Moderne Kunst	Ishøj	Denmark		
2020	Walls	Kunstmuseum Stuttgart, Stuttgart Germany Studio Berlin, Berghain	Berlin	Germany		
2020	Szene Berlin	Schloss Derneburg, Hall Art Foundations	Holle	Germany		
2020	Shapeshifters	Malmö Art Museum	Mälmo	Sweden		
2020	I Put A Spell On You: On Artists Collaborations	SCAD	Savannah	United States		
2020	A Greater Perspective	The606, Damen Arts Plaza,	Chicago	United States		
2020	WALKING. Movements North of Bolzano	The collection of Erling Kagge, Museion	Bolzano	Italy		
2020	On the Frontline of Contemporary Art: From the Taguchi Art Collection	Shimonoeseki Art Museum	Yamaguchi	Japan		
2020	OH! MY CITY	Paradise Art Space	Incheon	South Korea		
2020	Who Am I	Tang Contemporary Art	Beijing	China		
2020	Friendship as a Way of Life	UNSW Galleries	Sydney	Australia		
2021	Statements	Palazzo della Ragione	Bergamo	Italy		
2021	Work It Out	Kunsten	Aalborg	Denmark		
2021	Psychopathia Sexualis	Overgaden	Copenhagen	Denmark		
2021	SkultpurOdense21	Hollufgård Skultpurparken	Odense	Denmark		
2021	Grave Monuments	Kunsthal Aarhus	Aarhus	Denmark		
2021	Tempo	Museum Sinclair-Haus,	Bad Heilbrunn	Germany		
2021	Wild/Schön	Kunsthalle Emden	Emden	Germany		
2021	Monument for the Cemetery	Art Sonje Center	Seoul	South Korea		
2021	OASIS	Tallinn Architecture Museum	Tallinn	Estonia		
2021	Sobressalto: Coleção Norlina e José Lima	CAA		Portugal		
2021	It's Just a Phase	KUK	Trondheim	Norway		
2022	Every Moment Counts—AIDS and its Feelings	Henie Onstad Art Center	Høvikodden	Norway		
2022	Matrix of Gender	Bomuldsfabriken	Arendal	Norway		
2022	Politics in Art	MOCAK Museum of Contemporary Art	Kraków	Poland		
2022	Art in the Elevator	Salzburg Museum der Moderne	Salzburg	Austria		
2022	CASH on the Wall	Stiftung Kunstforum Berliner Volksbank	Berlin	Germany		
2022	Why can't we live together	Marburg Kunstverein	Marburg	Germany		
2022	Blue Jeans – Myth and Marketing	Museumsquarier Osnabrück	Osnabrück	Germany		
2022	MARMOR / MARBLE	Kunsten	Aalborg	Denmark		
2022	Heroic Bodies	Rudolph Tegners Museum		Denmark		
2022	HEM / HOME	Konstgalleriet Slottsholmen	Malmö	Sweden		
2022	And Now the Good News	Pera Museum	Istanbul	Turkey		
2022	Exposition homosexuels et lesbiennes dans l'Europe nazie	Metz City Hall	Metz	France		
2022	Impossibles architectures	Musees des Beaux-Arts de Nancy	Nancy	France		

== Collections ==
Elmgreen & Dragset's work is in the permanent collection of several museums across the world including:

- Mumok, "Museum of modern art, Ludwig Foundation, Vienna, Austria
- TBA21 Thyssen-Bornemisza Art Contemporary, Vienna, Austria
- Museum Hof van Busleyden, Mechelen, Belgium
- Vanhaerents Art Collection, Brussels, Belgium
- Museum Voorlinden, Wassenaar, Belgium
- National Gallery of Canada, Ottawa, Canada
- Kunsthalle Praha, Prague, Czech Republic
- K11 Art Foundation, Hong Kong, China
- Arken Museum of Modern Art, Ishøj, Denmark
- ARoS Aarhus Kunstmuseum, Aarhus, Denmark
- Dokk1, Aarhus, Denmark
- Københavns Billedkunstudvalg, Copenhagen, Denmark
- KØS Museum of art in public spaces, Køge, Denmark
- KUNSTEN Museum of Modern Art Aalborg, Aalborg, Denmark
- Louisiana Museum of Modern Art, Humlebaek, Denmark
- Museet for Samtidskunst, Roskilde, Denmark
- National Gallery of Denmark, Statens Museum for Kunst, Copenhagen, Denmark
- EMMA – Espoo Museum of Modern Art, Espoo, Finland
- Saastamoinen Foundation, Helsinki, Finland
- Centre National des Arts Plastiques, Paris, France
- Fondation Emerige, Paris, France
- Fonds national d'art contemporain, Paris, France
- European Central Bank, Frankfurt, Germany
- Galerie Orangerie-Reinz, Cologne, Germany
- Hamburger Bahnhof – Museum für Gegenwart, Berlin, Germany
- Kunstverein Springhornhof, Neuenkirchen, Germany
- Museum für Moderne Kunst, Frankfurt, Germany
- KAT_Kunst am Turm, Bad Honnef-Rhöndorf, Germany
- Kunsthalle Bremen, Bremen, Germany
- Kunstmuseen Krefeld, Krefeld, Germany
- Kunstverein Springhornhof, Neuenkirchen, Germany
- Museum für Moderne Kunst, Frankfurt, Germany
- Museum Morsbroich, Leverkusen, Germany
- Pinakothek der Moderne, Munich, Germany
- Sammlung Boros, Berlin, Germany
- Sammlung Goetz, Munich, Germany
- Staatliche Kunstsammlungen Dresden, Dresden, Germany
- Städel Museum, Frankfurt am Main, Germany
- Stiftung Denkmal, Berlin, Germany
- Sunpride Foundation, Hong Kong
- Tel Aviv Museum of Art, Tel Aviv, Israel
- Israel Museum, Jerusalem, Israel
- Fondazione Prada, Milan, Italy
- Museion, Bolzano, Italy
- Fukutake Art Museum Foundation, Naoshima, Japan
- Aïshti Foundation, Beirut, Lebanon
- Colección Jumex, Fundación Jumex Arte Contemporáneo, Mexico City, Mexico
- Sculpture International Rotterdam (SIR), Rotterdam, Netherlands
- Astrup Fearnley Museum of Modern Art, Oslo, Norway
- Ekebergparken Sculpture Park, Oslo, Norway
- Kistefos-Museet, Jevnaker, Norway
- Equinor Art Programme, Stavanger, Norway
- Kistefos-Museet, Jevnaker, Norway
- Kode Art Museums, Bergen, Norway
- Kunstneriske Forstyrrelser, Tranøy, Norway
- Nasjonalmuseet, Oslo, Norway
- Park of the School of Agriculture, Ås, Norway
- Trondheim Kunstmuseum, Trondheim, Norway
- Anyang Foundation for Culture & Arts, Anyang, South Korea
- Leeum, Samsung Museum of Art, Seoul, South Korea
- Museo de Arte Contemporáneo Helga de Alvear, Cáceres, Spain
- CGAC (Centro Galego de Arte Contemporánea), A Coruña, Spain
- MUSAC (Museo de Arte Contemporáneo de Castilla y León), León, Spain
- Malmö Konstmuseum, Malmö, Sweden
- Moderna Museet, Stockholm, Sweden
- Nicola Erni Collection, Zug, Switzerland
- Migros Museum für Gegenwartskunst, Zurich, Switzerland
- Soho House, London, United Kingdom
- Zabludowicz Collection, London, United Kingdom
- Art Production Fund / Ballroom Marfa, Marfa, United States
- Chazen Museum of Art, Madison, United States
- Columbus Museum of Art, Ohio, United States
- Denver Art Museum, Denver, United States
- The Donum Estate, Sonoma, United States
- Museum of Contemporary Art Chicago, Chicago, United States
- Nevada Museum of Art, Reno, United States

== Commissions ==
- Powerless Structures, Fig. 101, Mayor of London's Fourth Plinth Commission, Trafalgar Square, London, United Kingdom, 2012
- Han commissioned by city of Helsingør, the sculpture installed in the center of the harbor basin as a protagonist in Kulturhavn Kronborg, 2012
- Louis Vuitton New Bond Street Maison and Louis Vuitton Librairie, London, 2012
- Van Gogh's Ear, Rockefeller Center, New York, 2016
- To Whom It May Concern, FIAC HORS LES MURS, Place Vendôme, Paris, 2018
- Zero, East Asiatic, Bangkok Art Biennale, 2018
- The Hive, Moynihan Train Hall, New York, United States, 2020
- Life Rings, Royal Djurgården, Stockholm, Sweden, 2021

== Catalogues ==
- Useless Bodies? (Milan: Nava Press, 2022). ISBN 9788887029802
- The Nervous System (New York: Pace, 2021). ISBN 9781948701488
- Elmgreen & Dragset: Sculptures (Berlin: Hatje Cantz Verlag, 2019). ISBN 9783775746229
- Elmgreen & Dragset (London: Phaidon, 2019). ISBN 9780714875712
- This Is How We Bite Our Tongue (London: Whitechapel Gallery, 2018). ISBN 9780854882656
- 15th Istanbul Biennial: a good neighbour: Exhibition and Stories (Istanbul: Istanbul Foundation for Culture and the Arts, 2017). ISBN 9786055275372
- Die Zugezogenen (London: Koenig Books, 2017). ISBN 9783960981930
- The Others (Berlin: König Galerie / London: Koenig Books, 2017). ISBN 9783960980698
- The Well Fair, Elmgreen & Dragset (London: Koenig Books / Beijing: Ullens Center for Contemporary Art, 2016). ISBN 9783863358952
- Aéroport Mille Plateaux, Elmgreen & Dragset (Seoul: PLATEAU, Samsung Museum of Art, 2015). ISBN 9788985468527
- Biography, Elmgreen & Dragset (Ostfildern: Hatje Cantz, 2014). ISBN 9783775738651
- Biography (reader), Elmgreen & Dragset, Gunnar B. Kvaran and Kjersti Solbakken, eds. (Berlin: Archive Books, 2014). ISBN 9783943620184
- A Space Called Public, Elmgreen & Dragset, eds. (Köln: Verlag der Buchhandlung Walther König, 2013). ISBN 9783863354398
- Elmgreen & Dragset: Trilogy, Peter Weibel and Andreas F. Beitin, eds., exh. cat., ZKM Center for Art and Media, Karlsruhe (London: Thames & Hudson, 2011). ISBN 9783865609083
- Elmgreen & Dragset: Performances: 1995-2011, Anita Iannacchione, ed. (Köln: Verlag der Buchhandlung Walther König, 2011). ISBN 9783863350994
- Elmgreen & Dragset: This is the First Day of My Life, Anna Stüler, ed. (Ostfildern: Hatje Cantz Verlag, 2008). ISBN 9783775720502
- Home is the Place You Left, Elmgreen & Dragset, Trondheim Kunstmuseum (Köln: Verlag der Buchhandlung Walther König, 2008). ISBN 9783865604736
- Prada Marfa, Elmgreen & Dragset (Köln: Verlag der Buchhandlung Walther König, 2007). No longer in print. ISBN 9783865601957
- The Welfare Show, Elmgreen & Dragset (Köln: Verlag der Buchhandlung Walther König, 2006). No longer in print. ISBN 9783883759678
- Taking Place, Beatrix Ruf, ed., exh. cat. Kunsthalle Zürich (Ostfildern: Hatje Cantz Verlag, 2002). No longer in print. ISBN 9783775711562
- Zwischen anderen Ereignissen, exh. cat. (Leipzig: Galerie für Zeitgenössische Kunst, 2000). No longer in print.
- Powerless Structures exh. cat. (1998). No longer in print.

== Gallery ==
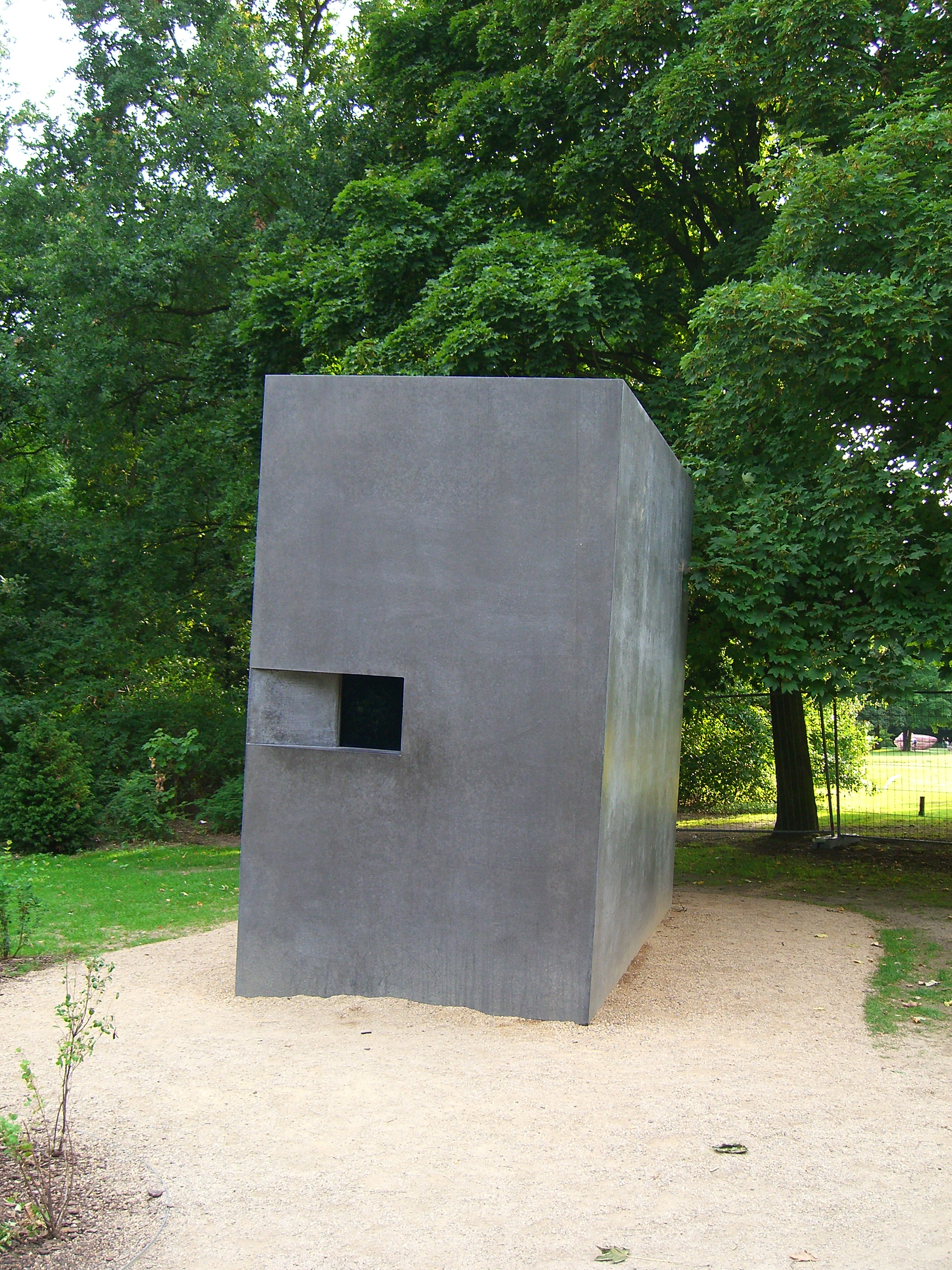
Memorial to Homosexuals persecuted under Nazism by Elmgreen and Dragset

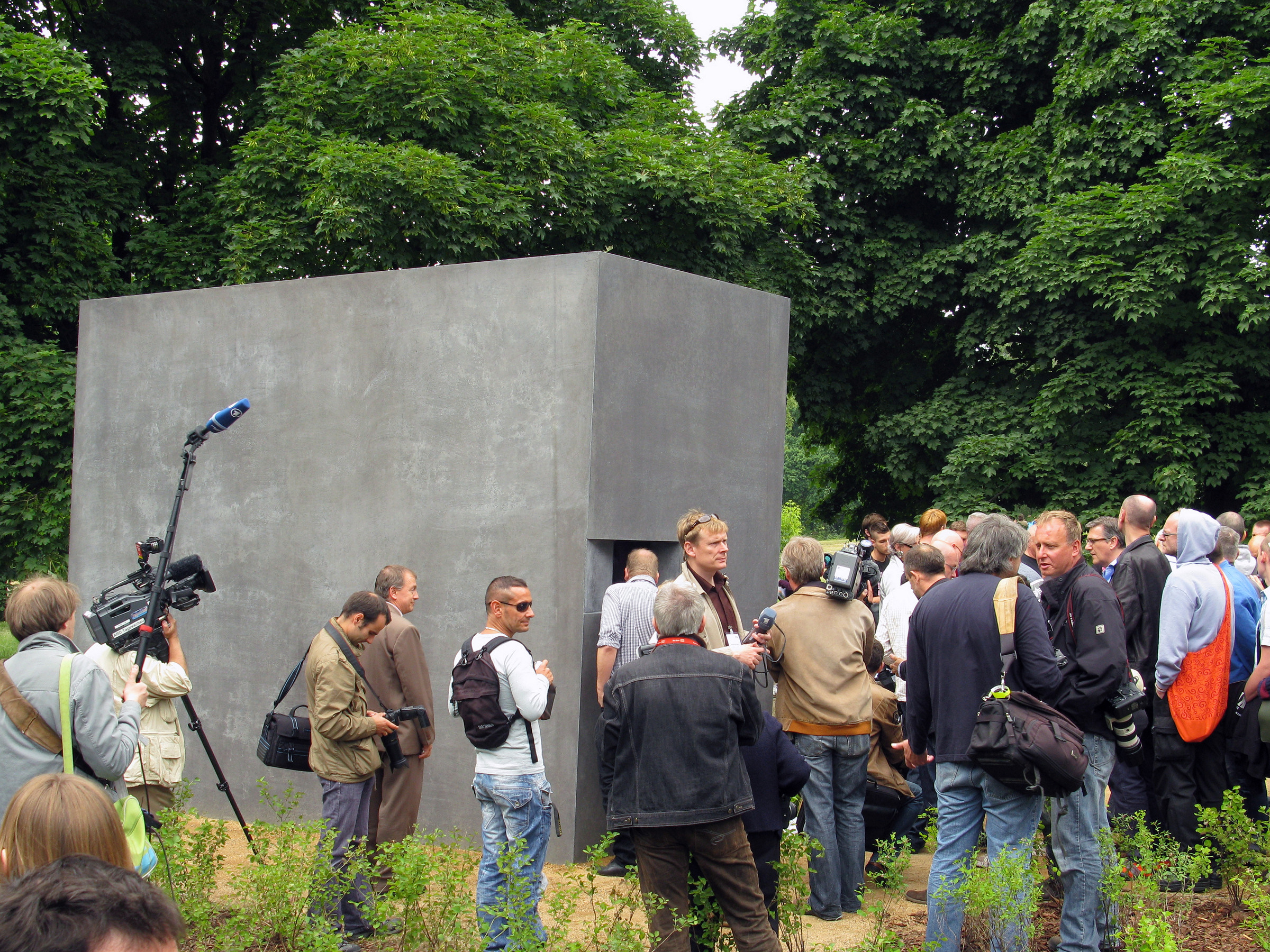
The unveiling of the memorial, 2008, 27 May

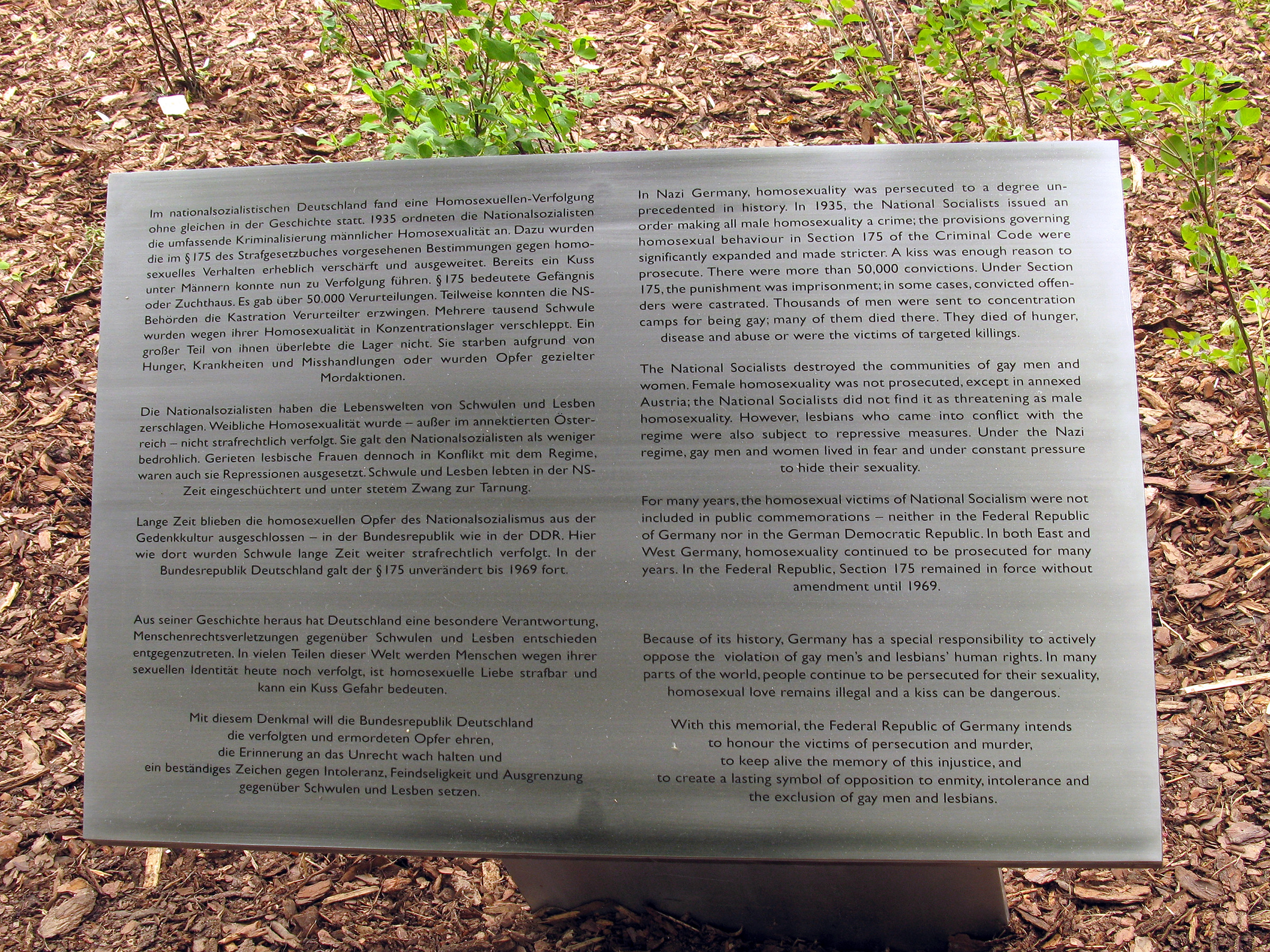
The signboard

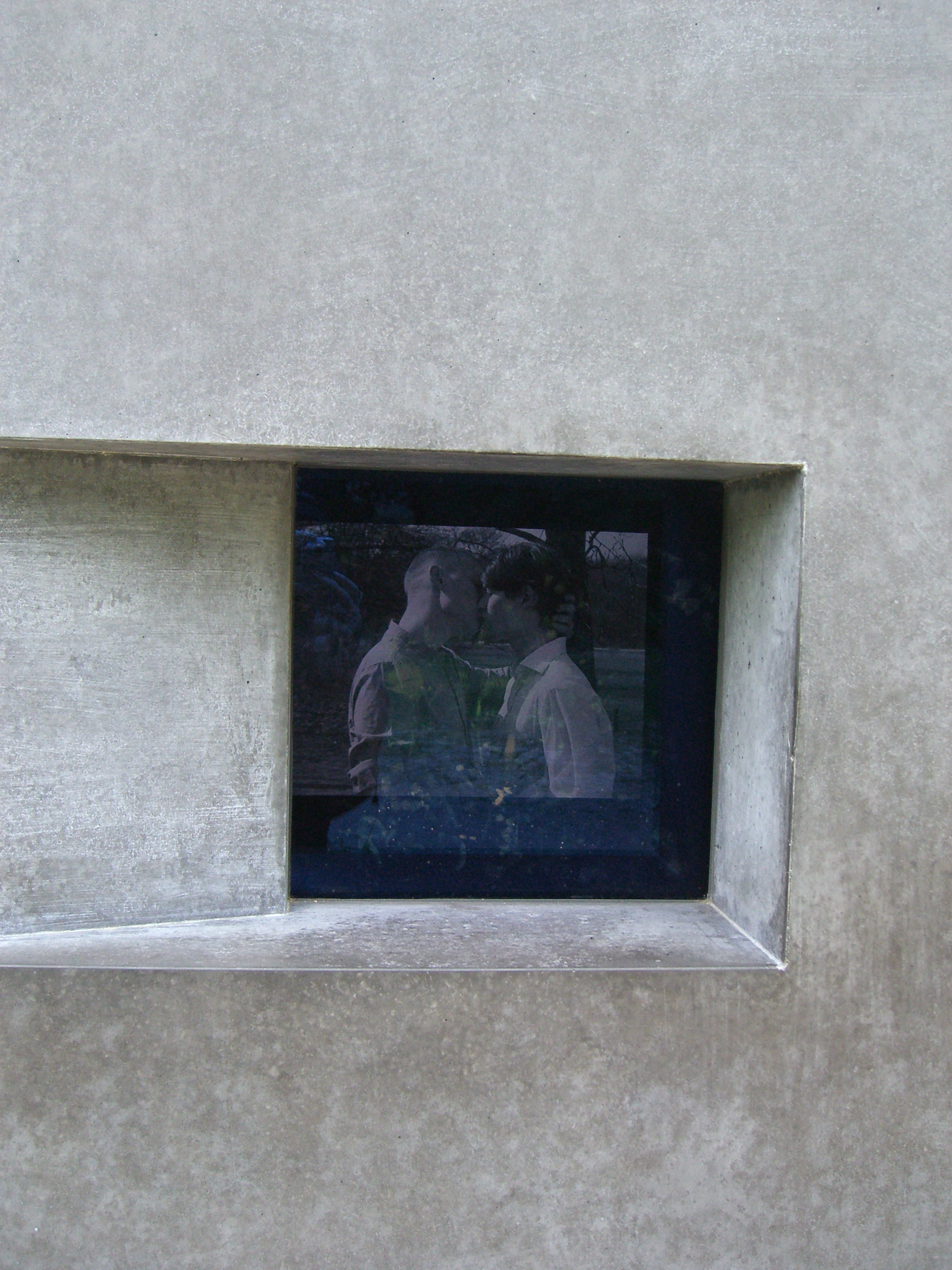
The video in the memorial
