= Katharina Fritsch =

German sculptor

- Born: 14 February 1956; Essen, West Germany
- Education: University of Münster; Kunstakademie Düsseldorf
- Known for: Sculpture

Katharina Fritsch (born 14 February 1956) is a German sculptor. She lives and works in Düsseldorf, Germany.

== Early life and education ==
Fritsch was born on 14 February 1956 in Essen, West Germany. Fritsch first studied history and art history at the University of Münster and, in 1977, transferred to Kunstakademie Düsseldorf where she was a student of Fritz Schwegler until 1984.

== Work ==
Warengestell mit Madonnen (Display Stand with Madonnas) (1987–1989) at the Hirshhorn Museum and Sculpture Garden in 2022

Fritsch is known for her sculptures and installations that reinvigorate familiar objects with a jarring and uncanny sensibility. Her works' iconography is drawn from many different sources, including Christianity, art history and folklore. She attracted international attention for the first time in the mid-1980s with life-size works such as a true-to-scale elephant along with replicas of everyday objects like a large display stand filled with statues of Madonna. Fritsch's art is often concerned with the psychology and expectations of visitors to a museum.

Rattenkönig (Rat King) (1993)

Händler (Dealer) (2001)

Gary Garrels wrote that “One of the remarkable features of Fritsch’s work is its ability both to capture the popular imagination by its immediate appeal and to be a focal point for the specialized discussions of the contemporary art world. This all too infrequent meeting point is at the center of her work, as it addresses the ambiguous and difficult relationships between artists and the public and between art and its display—that is, the role of art and exhibitions and of the museum in the late twentieth century.” The special role colour plays in Fritsch's work has roots in her childhood visits to her grandfather, a salesman for Faber-Castell art supplies, whose garage was well-stocked with his wares.

Her most recognized works are Rattenkönig/Rat King (1993), a giant circle of black polyester rats, included in the Venice Biennale in 1999. Other works include Mönch (Monk) (2003), a stoic, monochromatic male figure, made of solid polyester with a smooth, matte black surface; Figurengruppe / Group of Figures (2006–2008), an installation of nine elements; and Hahn/Cock (2010), a 14 ft (4.3m) cockerel in ultramarine blue to be shown on London's Trafalgar Square Fourth plinth from July 2013 to January 2015.

Hahn/Cock (2010/2013) in Trafalgar Square in 2013

In her working process, Fritsch combines the techniques of traditional sculpture with those of industrial production. While many of her early works were handcrafted, Fritsch now makes only the models for her sculptures and then hands these over to a factory for production, to "near-pathological specifications". She uses these models to create moulds, from which the final sculptures are cast in materials such as plaster, polyester and aluminium. Many are made as editions, meaning that multiple casts are taken from one mould. For the duration of some of her exhibitions, Fritsch has made her multiples available for sale at the respective museums.

When working with human forms, Fritsch often collaborates with a model named Frank Fenstermacher. One of her muses, he “stands for the generic ‘man’” in works such as her three ‘bad’ men: The Monch, the Doktor and the Handler. Fritsch explains her prolonged working relationship with Frank in terms of expression: "Somehow Frank's able to express what I want to express. I don't know why. Maybe he looks a little bit like my father, or like me. And he's a kind of actor. It's very strange how he can change from one character to another without appearing to do anything. He's always the man." Fritsch's process in creating human figures is similar to her animal or object creations, except a live human is involved. She takes photographs of the model, trying out ideas and recording the details of the model's position. In the creation of the mold, she and her plaster technicians cover the model in vaseline and create the mold on top. After a dramatic, near death situation in which Frank was covered in too much plaster and turned blue, with his head “lolling forwards” Fritsch has made full-body casts from mannequins. She still uses human models for the face and hands of her figures. After Fritsch is happy with the plaster mold, she uses silicon to make a negative model and then polyester to create a positive form from the silicon. The different pieces are painstakingly put together because “the surface has to be absolutely perfect.” Fritsch then paints or sprays the sculpture to finish it.

In her work, Fritsch has been credited in continuing the work of Marcel Duchamp by responding to his ideas and change viewers’ perceptions of them. For example, Fritsch's first major piece in the Museum of Modern Art's collection was Black Table with Table Ware (1985). It, outside of a museum, could be seen as an everyday object but it is “strangely symmetrical” and placed in a museum context, changing the viewer's approach to it, much like Duchamp.

In 2001, Fritsch was appointed Professor of Sculpture at the Academy of Fine Arts, Münster, a post she held until 2010. She is currently Professor of Sculpture at Kunstakademie Düsseldorf.

== Exhibitions ==
Fritsch has staged a large number of solo shows and exhibitions at museums and galleries across the world. Her major solo shows include Katharina Fritsch (1985), Galerie Johnen & Schöttle, Cologne; Katharina Fritsch (1988), Kunsthalle Basel; Katharina Fritsch: Rat-King (1993), Dia Chelsea, New York City; Katharina Fritsch (2001), Tate, London; Katharina Fritsch (2012), Art Institute of Chicago; and Multiples (2017), Walker Art Center, Minneapolis.

Fritsch has also participated in many group shows, including the Biennale of Sydney (1988), the 46th Venice Biennale (1995), the 48th Venice Biennale (1999), the Gwangju Biennale (2010), the 54th Venice Biennale (2011), and the 59th Venice Biennale (2022).

== Art market ==
Fritsch has been represented by Matthew Marks Gallery in New York since 1994, and has exhibited with White Cube in London.

Her most expensive sculpture at the art market was Geist und Blutlache (Spirit and Pool of Blood) (1988) who sold by £159,200 ($281,586) at Christie's, on 23 October 2005.

== Notable works in public collections ==
- Gespenst und Blutlache (Ghost and Pool of Blood) (1988), Art Institute of Chicago and Philadelphia Museum of Art
- Warengestell mit Madonnen (Display Stand with Madonnas) (1987–1989), Hirshhorn Museum and Sculpture Garden, Smithsonian Institution, Washington, DC and Staatsgalerie Stuttgart
- Eight Paintings with Eight Colors (1990–1991), Museum of Modern Art, New York City
- Mann und Maus (1991-1992), Seattle Art Museum
- Kind mit Pudeln (Child with Poodles) (1995–1996), San Francisco Museum of Modern Art
- Rattenkönig (Rat King) (1998), Art Institute of Chicago and Schaulager, Münchenstein, Switzerland
- Mönch (Monk) (1997–1999), Art Institute of Chicago and Glenstone, Potomac, Maryland
- Händler (Dealer) (2001), Glenstone, Potomac, Maryland
- St. Katharina (St. Catherine) (2004), Walker Art Center, Minneapolis
- Group of Figures (2006–2008), Museum of Modern Art, New York
- Hahn/Cock (2010/2013), National Gallery of Art, Washington, DC and Walker Art Center, Minneapolis
- Sarg (Coffin) (2016), Centre Pompidou, Paris

== Awards ==
- 1984 – Kunstpreis Rheinische Post, Düsseldorf
- 1989 – Kunstpreis Glockengasse, Cologne
- 1994 – Coutts & Co. International Award, London
- 1996 – Kunstpreis Aachen
- 1999 – Junge Stadt sieht Junge Kunst, Wolfsburg
- 2002 – Konrad-von-Soest-Preis des Landschaftsverband Westfalen-Lippe
- 2008 – Piepenbrock Prize for Sculpture
- 2014 – Kunstpreis Düsseldorf
- 2022 – Golden Lion for lifetime achievement, Venice Biennale
- 2022 – Großer Kulturpreis der Sparkassen-Kulturstiftung Rheinland
- 2025 – Goslarer Kaiserring

== See also ==
- List of German women artists

== Selected bibliography ==
- Katharina Fritsch. San Francisco: San Francisco Museum of Modern Art, 1996.
- Katharina Fritsch. Wolfsburg: Stadische Galerie Wolfsburg, 1999.
- Katharina Fritsch. New York: Matthew Marks Gallery, 2000.
- Blazwick, Iwona. Katharina Fritsch. London: Tate, 2002.
- Figure in the Garden: Katharina Fritsch at The Museum of Modern Art. Cologne: Walther König, 2013.
