= Franz Erhard Walther =

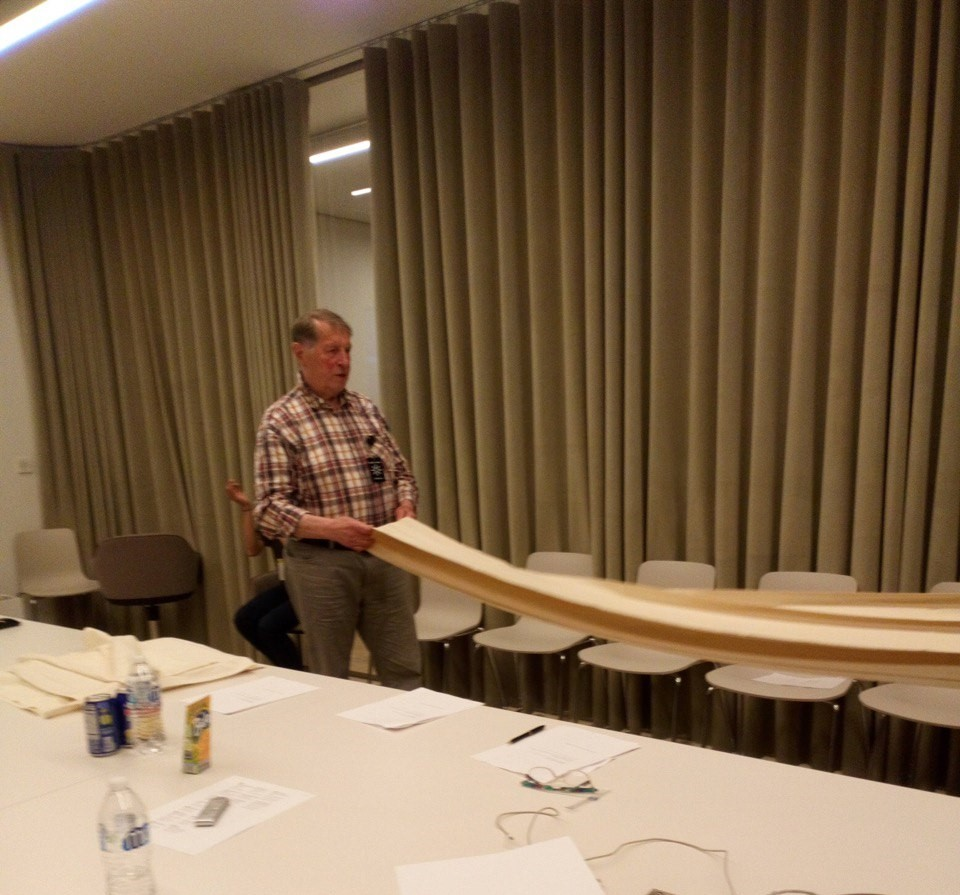
Walther in 2018

Franz Erhard Walther (born July 22, 1939, in Fulda, Germany) is an interdisciplinary installation and conceptual artist known for his fabric objects and activations.

== Early life and education ==
Born in 1939 in Fulda, Walther studied successively at the Werkkunstschule Offenbach and the Städelschule from 1957.

Walther later studied at Kunstakademie Düsseldorf in the early 1960s. During his education his professor Karl Otto Götz said 'Mr. Walther, I do not understand at all what you are doing. But you are a serious young man. Go ahead.' He studied under Götz with among others Sigmar Polke and Gerhard Richter.

== Career ==
Walther began to experiment with ways to actively involve spectators in the production of the work in the late 1950s. At this time he produced 'word' pictures in a bid to force the viewer to create their own image.

In the early 60s, Walther began to experiment with paper as the work itself rather than as a ground, displaying the work in stacks that the audience were invited to leaf through, or large books with which they could interact. Between 1963 and 1969, he created the First Work Set, which consists of 58 activatable pieces that place the viewer in extraordinary interpersonal situations. Under the influence of Pop Art, Walther's textiles became increasingly colorful.

Walther moved to New York City in 1967 and stayed there until 1971.

From 1971 to 2009, Walther was Professor at the University of Fine Arts of Hamburg. His Dust of Stars. A Drawn Novel (2007/9) is composed of 524 pages of pencil drawings and handwritten texts.

== Exhibitions ==
Erhard's work was included in the show Spaces at the Museum of Modern Art in New York alongside that of Larry Bell, Michael Asher, Dan Flavin, Robert Morris, and Pulsa. The exhibit ran from December 30, 1969, until March 1, 1970.

In 2008, Walther's WERKSATZ (WORKSET) was performed at the Tate Modern in London as part of "UBS Openings: Live – The Living Currency". Other exhibitions were held at the Hamburger Kunsthalle (2013) and Dia Beacon (2021–2022).

Walther's work has been included in four editions of Documenta in Kassel, Germany; 1972, 1977, 1982, and 1987.

In 2023, Walther was commissioned by Performa for the Performa 23 biennial for which he created his work Creation Needs Action.

== Collections ==
Walther's work is in many public collections, including the Art Institute of Chicago; Centre Pompidou, Paris; Dia Art Foundation, New York; Museum of Modern Art, New York; and Staatsgalerie Stuttgart.

== Recognition ==
In 1989, Walther was awarded the Edwin Scharff Prize and in 1994 the Piepenbrock Prize for Sculpture.

In 2017, Walther was awarded the Golden Lion for the Best Artist in the Central Pavilion at the Venice Biennale.
