= The End (sculpture) =

Public artwork in Trafalgar Square, London

Coordinates: 51°30′29″N 0°07′43″W

The End (stylised in all caps) is a sculpture by British artist Heather Phillipson, which was installed on the fourth plinth at Trafalgar Square, London, from 2020 to 2022. The sculpture depicted a gigantic dollop of melting whipped cream, topped with a cherry, with a fly and a functioning drone scaling its surface. The drone was fitted with a camera, which sent a live feed of the surrounding area to a dedicated website. Standing 9.4 metres (31 ft) in height, the sculpture was the tallest installation to date as part of the Mayor of London's Fourth Plinth Programme, which features a rolling commission of public artworks.

== Background ==
Phillipson has said that The End was conceived in the wake of the 2016 United States presidential election, as well as the aftermath of the Brexit referendum in the United Kingdom. The work was also a response to the history of Trafalgar Square as a site for public celebration, mass protest, and surveillance. It was described by some as a "dystopian" work, with the melting cream symbolising society on the verge of collapse. Observer noted that the livestream from the camera drone meant that "the work of art [was] literally surveilling its audience", offering the possibility of engaging with the piece from anywhere in the world "by spying on unsuspecting passers-by in true dystopian fashion".

The unveiling of the sculpture was originally scheduled for 26 March 2020, but was postponed as the UK went into lockdown during the COVID-19 pandemic, on the day it was due to be installed. It was finally unveiled in what the i newspaper called a "quiet reveal" on 30 July 2020. Phillipson herself acknowledged that The End had taken on new meaning in the context of the global pandemic.

The sculpture was constructed from steel and polystyrene, with a sprayed hard coat of polyurethane, and weighed 9 tonnes. The cherry on top was described by Apollo magazine as "so glossy that it looks as though it's been coated in nail varnish". The End was the first fully accessible commission for the Fourth Plinth, with part of the plaque in Braille, a tactile image of the work, and an audio description available online. It was on display until 15 August 2022; as of January 2023, the sculpture remained in storage.

== Reception ==
Writing for The Guardian, Tim Jonze wrote that the sculpture had 'got him through 2021', noting the contrast between the sculpture and its surroundings, and that he had enjoyed "the sheer absurdity of its existence" as "just a big, sweet treat sitting cheerily among the greying war generals and their horses". Phillipson has said that "the impression of something being dumped from the stratosphere" was deliberate, and that she had wanted to explore "how it would land conceptually, but also, simply, visually – brazenly – among all that statuary".

Several observers emphasised the tension between the superficially "jolly" appearance of the giant confection and the darker undertones suggested by the drone and fly. Arts and culture journalist Arwa Haider wrote in Elephant magazine that "The End is a work that positively entices you before its details make you recoil: a luscious-looking giant dollop of cream with a cherry on top, with a monstrous fly astride its swirl, and an insect-like drone camera near its peak." New York Times culture reporter Alex Marshall characterised The End as an "ambiguous piece", and argued that the ambiguity was "central to the charm of Phillipson's works, whose bright, over-the-top exteriors often belie their dark, urgent messages".

Art critic Thomas Marks wrote in Apollo: The International Art Magazine that The End was "most striking" as "a monument to the scale of our overindulgence, to the cartoonish temptations of sugar and processed foods, and a memento mori of how they are expanding our waistlines." Commenting that the sculpture's portrayal of how "easy allure gives way to disgust" recalled Andy Warhol and other artists' treatments of fast food, Marks pointed out that The End was likely an allusion to Claes Oldenburg and Coosje van Bruggen's Dropped Cone (2001), a massive vanilla ice cream sculpture displayed on the roof of a shopping mall in Cologne, Germany.
