= Hahn/Cock =

Sculpture by Katharina Fritsch

- Hahn/Cock unveiled in 2013 in Trafalgar Square
- Artist: Katharina Fritsch
- Year: 2010 (designed); 2013 (unveiled)
- Medium: Fibreglass
- Dimensions: 472 cm (15 ft 6 in)
- Location: National Gallery of Art, Washington D.C., Minneapolis Sculpture Garden, Minneapolis

Hahn/Cock is a sculpture of a giant blue cockerel by the German artist Katharina Fritsch. It was unveiled in London's Trafalgar Square on 25 July 2013 and was displayed on the vacant fourth plinth. The fibreglass work stood 4.72 metres (15.5 ft) high and was the sixth work to be displayed on the plinth, on which it stayed until 17 February 2015. It was subsequently acquired by Glenstone, a private museum, and exhibited at the National Gallery of Art in Washington, DC, following its 2016 reopening. In March 2021, Glenstone permanently donated the piece to the National Gallery.

The work is in an edition of two. The second version is in the sculpture garden of the Walker Art Center in Minneapolis, Minnesota, on a pedestal designed by the artist, where it has acquired the nickname The Blue Rooster.

== Meanings ==
Fritsch says that there are many possible interpretations of the cockerel, which took her two and a half years to create, but calls it "a feminist sculpture, since it is I who am doing something active here – I, a woman, am depicting something male. Historically it has always been the other way around. Now we are changing the roles. And a lot of men are enjoying that." She notes that the surrounding area has a strongly male character, with numerous statues of "male persons standing on pedestals" and the male-dominated culture that goes with London's status as a business centre. The statue is intended to be a humorous counterbalance, contrasting with the very formal equestrian statues on the square's other three plinths: "Humour is always a big thing for me. It stops things from becoming too severe. I like English humour. It is so often very dark."

The sculpture was selected by the Fourth Plinth Commissioning Group, a panel of specialist advisors that guides and monitors the commissions for the plinth. According to a press release issued by the group to announce Fritsch as the winner of the commission,

The sculpture ... communicates on different levels. First of all is the consideration of the formal aspect of its placement: the mostly grey architecture of Trafalgar Square would receive an unexpectedly strong colour accentuation, the size and colour of the animal making the whole situation surreal or simply unusual. The cockerel is also a symbol for regeneration, awakening and strength and finally, the work refers, in an ironic way, to male-defined British society and thoughts about biological determinism.

It was unveiled on 25 July 2013 by Mayor of London Boris Johnson. He pointed out the irony that the cockerel, an unofficial national emblem of France, was standing in a square commemorating a famous British victory over the French. Fritsch has said that she was unaware of the connection until it was explained to her. According to Fritsch, she chose the cockerel to represent strength and regeneration, "but it's a nice humorous side-effect to have something French in a place that celebrates victory over Napoleon. He has come back as a cockerel!" Johnson said in his speech that "I hope French people will not take it as excessive British chauvinism – but for me it stands for the recent British triumph in the Tour de France, which we have won twice in a row ... it is a symbol of French sporting pride, brought like a chicken to London. We have mounted this French cock at the heart of our imperial square."

Fritsch and Johnson have both noted the sexual double entendre in the work's name – in English – and the artist admits that it is consciously intended as a play on words. She highlighted the fact that Trafalgar Square itself has a somewhat phallic character: "It's about male posing, about showing power, about showing ... erections! I mean, look at that column!" Asked whether he felt that the cock had crushed his manhood, Johnson said: "No, not at all. I am happy to channel the power and enthusiasm of that bird; I feel inspired by its regal manner and mood of confidence." He told the crowd that he would "not lapse into double entendres and ask how long this wonderful creature will 'stay up' in the square," before unveiling what he called a "big, blue ... bird."

== Reception ==
The giant cock received generally positive reviews from art critics, with punning headlines such as "Big blue cock erected on fourth plinth in London's Trafalgar Square", "Boris Johnson in Trafalgar Square with a Massive Blue Cock And Disgruntled Woman" and "Boris Johnson unveils giant cock in Trafalgar Square".

Adrian Searle of The Guardian commented that "the scale and modelling and degree of detail feel right", with a "lifelike and other-worldly" feel to the sculpture. He felt that it avoided "straining to look meaningful or relevant" and that despite its irreverence, it "lightens the mood and lifts the spirit." The Daily Telegraph's Serena Davis did not regard it as being as impressive as some of the previous works to have stood on the fourth plinth, but nonetheless called it "one of the jolliest things to have sat upon the square's spare plinth since the public art commissions for it began in 2005."

BBC News' arts correspondent Rebecca Jones wrote that the work has "a kind of joyful aspect to it which will put a smile on many people's faces". Visitors interviewed by the London Evening Standard newspaper also gave it a thumbs up. The Thorney Island Society, a local conservation group, objected to the sculpture on the grounds that it was "unrelated to the context of Trafalgar Square and adds nothing to it but a feeble distraction", but The Guardian's chief arts writer Charlotte Higgins pointed out that Fritsch's other works have a habit of "appear[ing] "fanciful and dramatic" and "unrelated" to their contexts." She commented that one should not "overthink it. It's a big, blue, funny, weird, surreal bird in Trafalgar Square. It's going to cheer us all up. Katharina's Cock, as I'd like to think of it, should be a hit."
