= Piepenbrock Prize for Sculpture =

- Piepenbrock Preis für Skulptur
- Country: Germany
- Presented by: Kulturstiftung Hartwig Piepenbrock
- Reward: €50,000
- First award: 1988
- Final award: 2008

The Piepenbrock Prize for Sculpture (German: 'Piepenbrock Preis für Skulptur') was a biennial sculpture prize awarded in Berlin, Germany, by the Kulturstiftung Hartwig Piepenbrock, a cultural foundation established by Hartwig Piepenbrock. It was awarded from 1988 to 2008; the first five prizes were limited to the German-speaking world. At €50,000, it was the highest-valued sculpture prize in Europe.

== Recipients ==
- 1988: Max Bill
- 1990: Ernst Hermanns
- 1992: Alf Lechner
- 1994: Franz Erhard Walther
- 1996: Erwin Heerich
- 1998: Ulrich Rückriem
- 2000: Eduardo Chillida
- 2002: Tony Cragg
- 2004: Dani Karavan
- 2006: Rebecca Horn
- 2008: Katharina Fritsch

An associated grant or bursary, the Piepenbrock Förderpreis für Skulptur, was also awarded to promising sculptors.
