= Fourth plinth =

Empty plinth on Trafalgar Square, London

Coordinates: 51.5082°N 0.12871°W

External image
- Photos of these three artworks and some newer ones

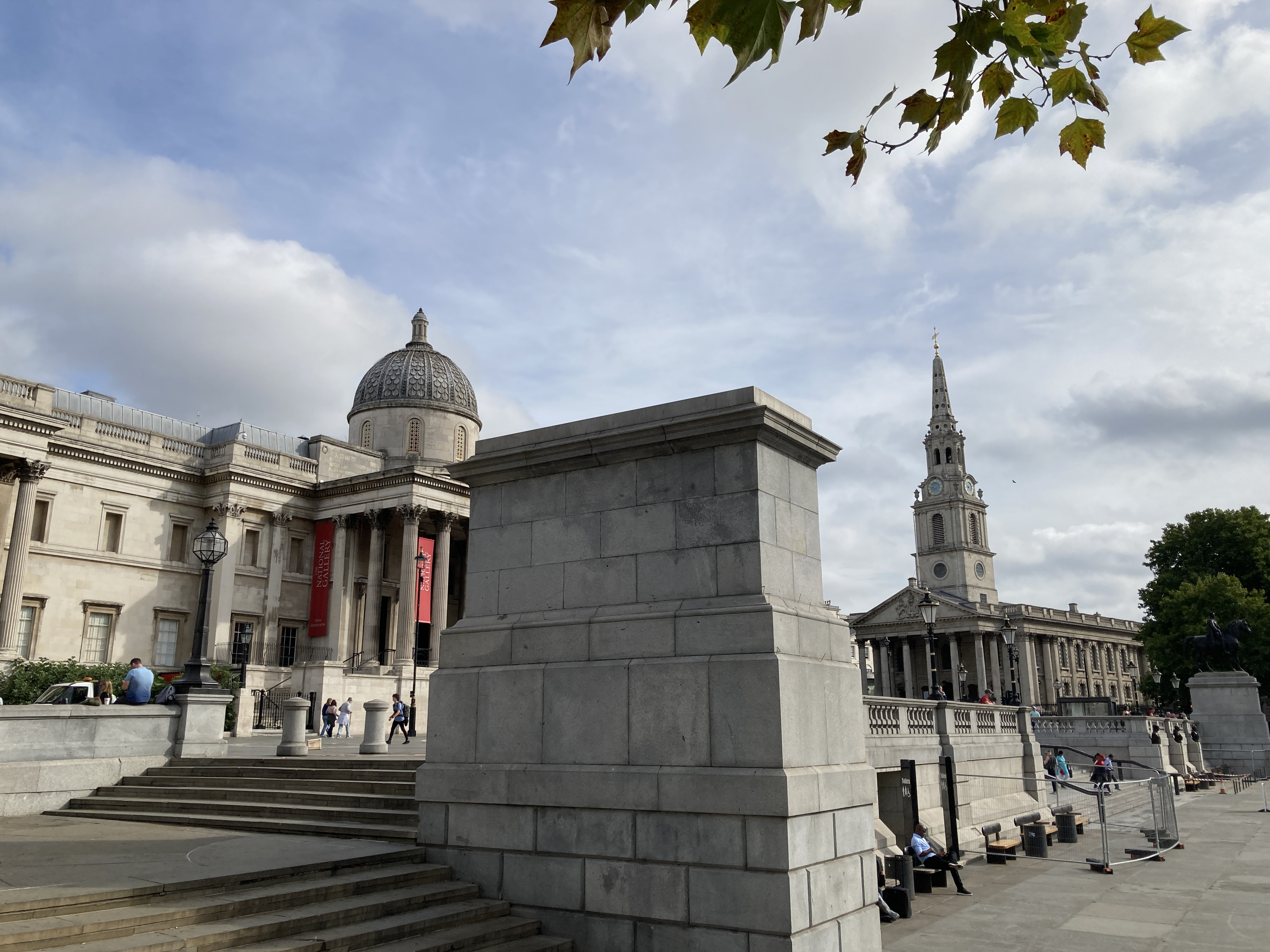
The empty plinth (September 2022)

The fourth plinth is the northwest plinth in Trafalgar Square in central London. It was originally intended to hold an equestrian statue of William IV, but remained empty due to lack of funds. For over 150 years, its use was debated; in 1998, the Royal Society for the Encouragement of Arts, Manufactures and Commerce (RSA) commissioned three contemporary sculptures to be displayed temporarily on the plinth. Shortly afterwards, Chris Smith, Secretary of State for Culture, Media and Sport, commissioned Sir John Mortimer to seek opinions from public art commissioners, critics and members of the public as to its future. Mortimer's final report recommended that there continue to be a rolling programme of commissioned temporary artworks rather than settle permanently on one figure or idea.

In 2003, the ownership of Trafalgar Square was transferred from Westminster City Council to the Mayor of London and this marked the beginning of the Mayor of London's Fourth Plinth Commission as it is now known.

== The plinths ==
There is a plinth at each of the four corners of the square. The two southern plinths carry sculptures of Henry Havelock and Charles James Napier. The northern plinths are larger than those in the southern corners, as they were designed to have equestrian statues, and indeed the northeastern plinth has one of George IV. The fourth plinth on the northwest corner, designed by Sir Charles Barry and built in 1841, was intended to hold an equestrian statue of William IV but remained empty due to insufficient funds.

== The Fourth Plinth Project (1999–2001) ==
In 1998, the RSA conceived the Fourth Plinth Project, which temporarily occupied the plinth with a succession of works commissioned and established by the Cass Sculpture Foundation. These were:

Photo	Dates	Artist	Title	Description
	1999	Mark Wallinger	Ecce Homo	Wallinger's Ecce Homo – the Latin title of which means "Behold the man", a reference to the words of Pontius Pilate at the trial of Jesus (John 19:5) – was a life-sized figure of Christ, naked apart from a loin cloth, with his hands bound behind his back and wearing a crown of barbed wire (in allusion to the crown of thorns). Atop the huge plinth, designed for larger-than-life statuary, it looked minuscule. Some commentators said that, far from making the Man look insignificant, his apparent tininess drew the eye powerfully; they interpreted it as a commentary on human delusions of grandeur.
	2000	Bill Woodrow	Regardless of History	A head crushed between a book and the roots of a tree.
	2001	Rachel Whiteread	Monument	Whiteread's Monument, by an artist already notable for her Turner Prize-winning work House and the Judenplatz Holocaust Memorial in Vienna, was a cast of the plinth in transparent resin placed upside-down on top of the original. The light refracted through the resin, adopting a hue that was partially influenced by the weather.

A committee convened to consider the RSA's late-1990s project concluded that it had been a success and "unanimously recommended that the plinth should continue to be used for an ongoing series of temporary works of art commissioned from leading national and international artists". After several years in which the plinth stood empty, the new Greater London Authority assumed responsibility for Trafalgar Square and the fourth plinth.

== The Fourth Plinth Commission (2005–present) ==
The Fourth Plinth Commission is led by the Mayor of London's Culture Team, under the guidance of the Fourth Plinth Commissioning Group. The group is made up of specialist advisers appointed to guide and monitor the commissions for the plinth.

Under the stewardship of the Fourth Plinth Commissioning Group, the following artworks have been commissioned:

Photo	Dates	Artist	Title	Description
	15 September 2005 – late 2007	Marc Quinn	Alison Lapper Pregnant	A 3.6-metre (12 ft) tall, 13-tonne Carrara marble torso-bust of Alison Lapper, an artist who was born with no arms and shortened legs due to a condition called phocomelia. It explores representations of beauty and the human form in public space, and was remade on an even larger scale for the closing ceremony of the London 2012 Summer Paralympic Games.
	2007	Thomas Schütte	Model for a Hotel 2007 (formerly Hotel for the Birds)	(unveiled 7 November 2007) – a 5-metre by 4.5-metre by 5-metre (16 ft × 15 ft × 16 ft) architectural model of a 21-storey building made from coloured glass. Sandy Nairne, director of the National Portrait Gallery and then chairman of the Fourth Plinth Commissioning Group that recommended Quinn's and Schütte's proposals to the Mayor in 2004, said: "There will be something extraordinarily sensual about the play of light through the coloured glass ... It's going to feel like a sculpture of brilliance and light."
	6 July – 14 October 2009	Antony Gormley	One & Other	Over the course of a hundred consecutive days, a total of 2,400 selected members of the public each spent one hour on the plinth. They were allowed to do anything they wished to and could take anything with them that they could carry unaided. Volunteers for the Fourth Plinth were invited to apply through the website www.oneandother.co.uk, and were chosen so that ethnic minorities and people from all parts of Britain were represented. For safety reasons, the plinth was surrounded by a net, and a team of six stewards were present 24 hours a day to make sure that, for instance, participants were not harmed by hecklers. There was a live feed of the plinth on the Internet sponsored by TV channel Sky Arts. Gormley said: "In the context of Trafalgar Square with its military, valedictory and male historical statues, this elevation of everyday life to the position formerly occupied by monumental art allows us to reflect on the diversity, vulnerability and particularity of the individual in contemporary society. It's about people coming together to do something extraordinary and unpredictable. It could be tragic but it could also be funny."
	24 May 2010 – January 2012	Yinka Shonibare	Nelson's Ship in a Bottle	This work is a depiction of Nelson's ship, HMS Victory, with sails made of printed fabric in a colourful West African pattern inside a large glass bottle stopped with a cork; the bottle is 4.7 metres long and 2.8 metres in diameter (15.4 ft × 9.2 ft). According to the Greater London Authority, the artwork is the first "to reflect specifically on the historical symbolism of Trafalgar Square, which commemorates the Battle of Trafalgar, and will link directly with Nelson's column. It is also the first commission by a black British artist." The work proved popular, and its removal in early 2012 led to fears that it would be sold to a Korean collector. The Art Fund launched a public appeal to raise money to buy the work from the artist. By April 2012 the money was raised, including £264,300 donated from the public and £50,000 each from The Art Fund and Shonibare's gallery Stephen Friedman. The work was the first of the commissions to be relocated and is now part of the permanent collection of the National Maritime Museum in Greenwich, London.
	23 February 2012 – April 2013	Michael Elmgreen and Ingar Dragset	Powerless Structures, Fig. 101	A 4.1-metre (13 ft) tall bronze sculpture of a boy on a rocking horse. Contrasting with the square's other statues which celebrate kings and military leaders, this commission was intended to portray "the heroism of growing up". The statue was unveiled by actress Joanna Lumley who called it a "completely unthreatening and adorable creature". The golden boy on a rocking horse, as a celebration of youth and hope, proved an apt image for the Olympic Games, featuring in television footage around the world and appearing in numerous feature films. After its display on the Fourth Plinth the sculpture was bought by the Annie og Otto Detlefs Fond and donated to the Arken Museum of Modern Art in Ishøj, Denmark, where it will go on view in late 2015. Michael Elmgreen was born in Copenhagen, a short distance away from the museum; Ingar Dragset's home city of Trondheim in Norway had also expressed an interest in acquiring the work. Christian Gether, the museum's director, said "I was at the National Gallery for the inauguration of the sculpture and saw straight away that its irony and humanism fits perfectly at Arken. The sculpture comes with tradition and renewal and it is an ironic commentary on the obeisance of warlords. At the same time, it praises the child's spontaneity and its playful approach to life".
	25 July 2013 – 17 February 2015	Katharina Fritsch	Hahn/Cock	A 4.72-metre (15.5 ft) tall blue sculpture of a domestic cockerel or rooster. The artist has described the cockerel as symbolising "regeneration, awakening and strength".
	5 March 2015 – 6 September 2016	Hans Haacke	Gift Horse	Depicts a skeletal, riderless horse. Haacke says the sculpture is a tribute to Scottish economist Adam Smith and English painter George Stubbs. The horse is based on an engraving by Stubbs taken from The Anatomy of the Horse published in 1766. Tied to the horse's front leg is an electronic ribbon displaying live the ticker of the London Stock Exchange, completing the link between power, money and history.
	29 September 2016 – 6 March 2018	David Shrigley	Really Good	A bronze sculpture of a human hand in a thumbs-up gesture, with the thumb greatly elongated. To the top of the thumb, the sculpture is 7 metres (23 ft) tall.
	28 March 2018 – 2020	Michael Rakowitz	The Invisible Enemy Should Not Exist	A recreation of a sculpture of a lamassu (a winged bull and protective deity) that stood at the entrance to Nergal Gate of Nineveh from 700 B.C. It was destroyed in 2015 by ISIS, along with other artefacts in the Mosul Museum. Rakowitz's recreation is made of empty Iraqi date syrup cans, representing the destruction of the country's date industry.
	30 July 2020 – September 2022	Heather Phillipson	The End	A dollop of whipped cream with an assortment of toppings: a cherry, a fly, and a drone. The drone filmed passers-by and its footage was broadcast on an internet livestream.
	September 2022 – 2024	Samson Kambalu	Antelope	Sculpture that restages a 1914 photograph of Baptist preacher and pan-Africanist John Chilembwe and European missionary John Chorley. Chilembwe wears a hat in an act of defiance, as this was illegal at the time.
	September 2024	Teresa Margolles	850 Improntas	Casts of the faces of 850 trans people from London and around the world. The "life masks" are arranged around the plinth in the form of a tzompantli, a skull rack from Mesoamerican civilisations.
	2026	Tschabalala Self	Lady In Blue	Bronze statue of an "everywoman" with lapis lazuli patina
	2028	Andra Ursuța	Untitled	Hollow equestrian statue made from translucent green resin

== Proposals for permanent statues ==
The best use of the fourth plinth remains the subject of debate and discussion. Proposals for permanent statues have included:

- Nelson Mandela Statue: On 24 March 2003, an appeal was launched by Wendy Woods, the widow of the anti-apartheid journalist Donald Woods, hoping to raise £400,000 to pay for a 9-foot-high (2.7 m) statue of Nelson Mandela by Ian Walters. The relevance of the location was that South Africa House, the South African high commission, scene of many anti-apartheid demonstrations, is on the east side of Trafalgar Square. The statue was later placed in Parliament Square instead.
- Keith Park statue: In February 2008, Terry Smith, the chief executive of trading house Tullett Prebon, offered to pay more than £100,000 for a permanent statue acceptable to "ordinary Londoners" of Air Chief Marshal Sir Keith Park in recognition of his work as commander of No. 11 Group RAF during the Battle of Britain, as it was this Group that was responsible for the defence of London. A Greater London Authority spokesman said: "There are many worthy suggestions for statues on the fourth plinth and some people feel passionately about each of them. All proposals will be judged on their merits including its current use as one of the most high profile sites for contemporary public art in London. The cost of erecting the current work on the plinth is £270,000. The cost of a permanent monument is likely to be considerably more." In 2009, a 5-metre (16 ft) high fibreglass statue of Park was placed on the fourth plinth for six months. After that period, a 2.78-metre (9 ft 1 in) bronze statue was permanently installed in Waterloo Place.
- Margaret Thatcher statue: Following the death of former Prime Minister Margaret Thatcher, Baroness Thatcher on 8 April 2013, Defence Secretary Philip Hammond suggested that her memorial statue be placed on the fourth plinth. Hammond's proposal was supported by Thatcher's colleague Norman Tebbit and by UKIP leader Nigel Farage. The then Prime Minister David Cameron and London Mayor Boris Johnson were both said to welcome the proposal. Johnson proposed Parliament Square as a more appropriate site. There is already an existing statue of Thatcher in the nearby Houses of Parliament.
- Queen Elizabeth II statue: It has also been suggested over several years that a permanent statue of Queen Elizabeth II might be erected on the plinth following her death, which would explain why there has been such a long delay in choosing a permanent monument. This proposal was discussed in the press in 2008. After Thatcher's death in 2013, Ken Livingstone commented, "The understanding is that the fourth plinth is being reserved for Queen Elizabeth II." On Queen Elizabeth's death in 2022, MPs expressed their support for the idea of the fourth plinth being used for a statue of her.
- Captain Sir Tom Moore statue: Following Moore's death on 2 February 2021, TV presenter Nick Knowles suggested that a statue of Moore should be placed permanently on the fourth plinth, in recognition of Moore's fundraising efforts in the run up to his 100th birthday during the COVID-19 pandemic.
- Alan Turing statue: On 19 July 2023, following an apology to LGBT veterans from the UK Government, Defence Secretary Ben Wallace suggested Turing should be honoured for his code-breaking efforts during the Second World War, describing him as "probably the greatest war hero, in my book, of the Second World War, [whose] achievements shortened the war, saved thousands of lives, helped defeat the Nazis. And his story is a sad story of a society and how it treated him."

== Other uses ==
Commercial companies have used the plinth, usually without permission, as a platform for publicity stunts, including a model of David Beckham by Madame Tussauds during the 2002 FIFA World Cup. The London-based American harmonica player Larry Adler jokingly suggested erecting a statue of Moby-Dick, which would then be called the "Plinth of Whales". A television ident for the British TV station Channel 4 shows a CGI Channel 4 logo on top of the fourth plinth.

=== Fourth Plinth Schools Awards ===
The annual Fourth Plinth Schools Award is the education project within the Mayor of London's Fourth Plinth Programme. The award uses the Fourth Plinth as an inspiration to engage primary and secondary schools in London to enter a competition that encourages creative thinking around past and present artworks displayed on the Fourth Plinth.

=== In popular culture ===
In Sir Arthur Conan Doyle's 1912 novel The Lost World, the narrator speculates that Professor Challenger "in his fancy, may ... see himself sometimes, gracing the vacant pedestal in Trafalgar Square".
