= Prada Marfa =

Permanent sculpture by Elmgreen and Dragset in Davis County, Texas, United States

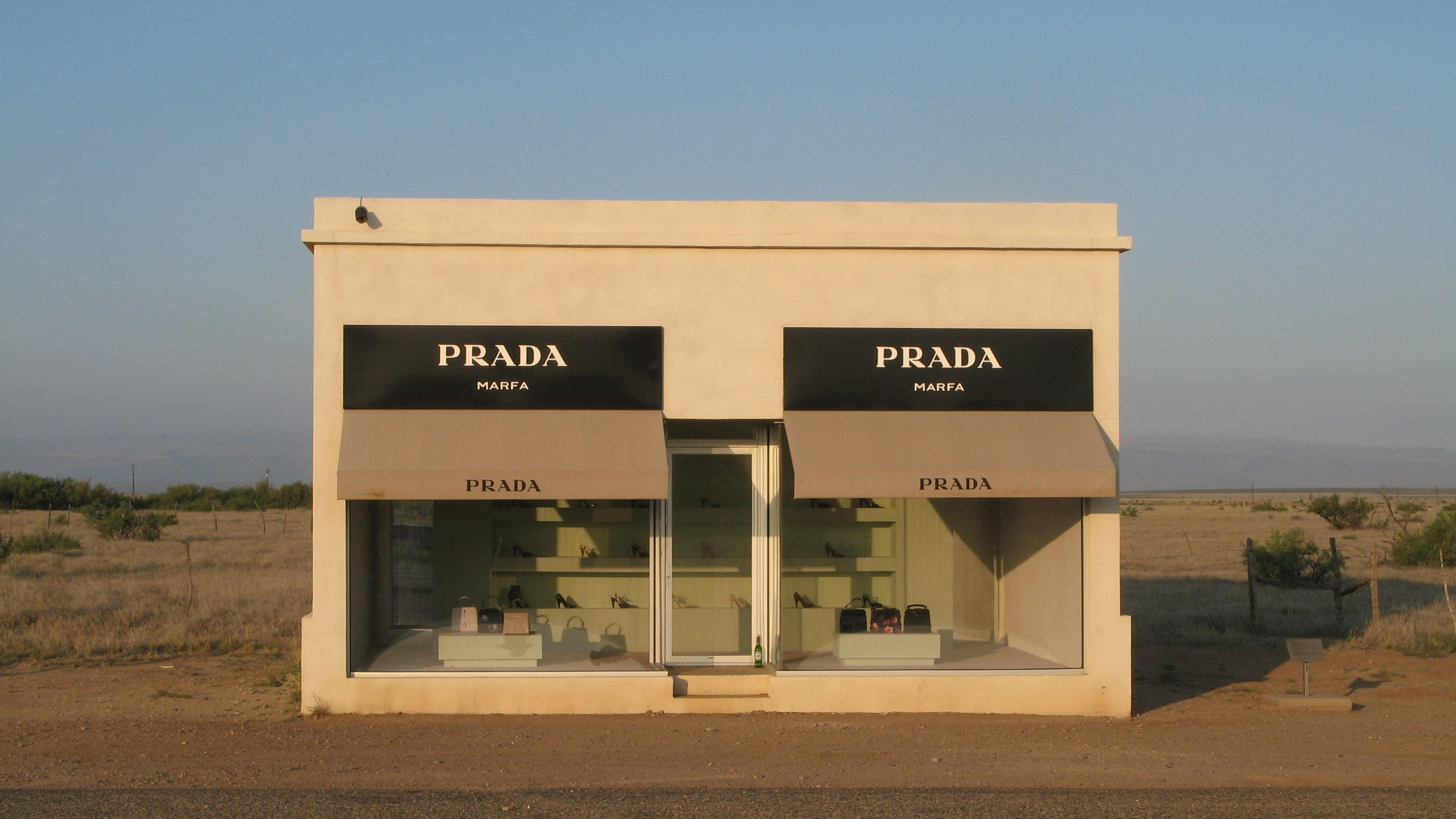
- Prada Marfa, May 2010
- Artist: Elmgreen & Dragset
- Year: October 1, 2005
- Type: Adobe, plaster, paint, glass panes, aluminum frames, MDF, carpet
- Dimensions: 15 ft × 25 ft (4.6 m × 7.6 m)
- Location: U.S. Route 90, Jeff Davis County, Texas; 30.60346°N 104.51850°W

Prada Marfa is a permanent sculptural art installation by artists Elmgreen & Dragset, located along U.S. Route 90 in Jeff Davis County, Texas, United States, 1.4 miles (2.3 km) northwest of Valentine, and about 26 miles (42 km) northwest of Marfa. The installation, in the form of a freestanding building—specifically a Prada storefront—was inaugurated on October 1, 2005. The artists described the work as a "pop architectural land art project."

Realized with the assistance of American architects Ronald Rael and Virginia San Fratello, the construction cost $120,000. The original intent was that the building would not be repaired, but would rather gradually degrade into its surroundings. This plan was revised after vandals graffitied the exterior and stole its contents, the night the sculpture was completed.

== Sculpture ==
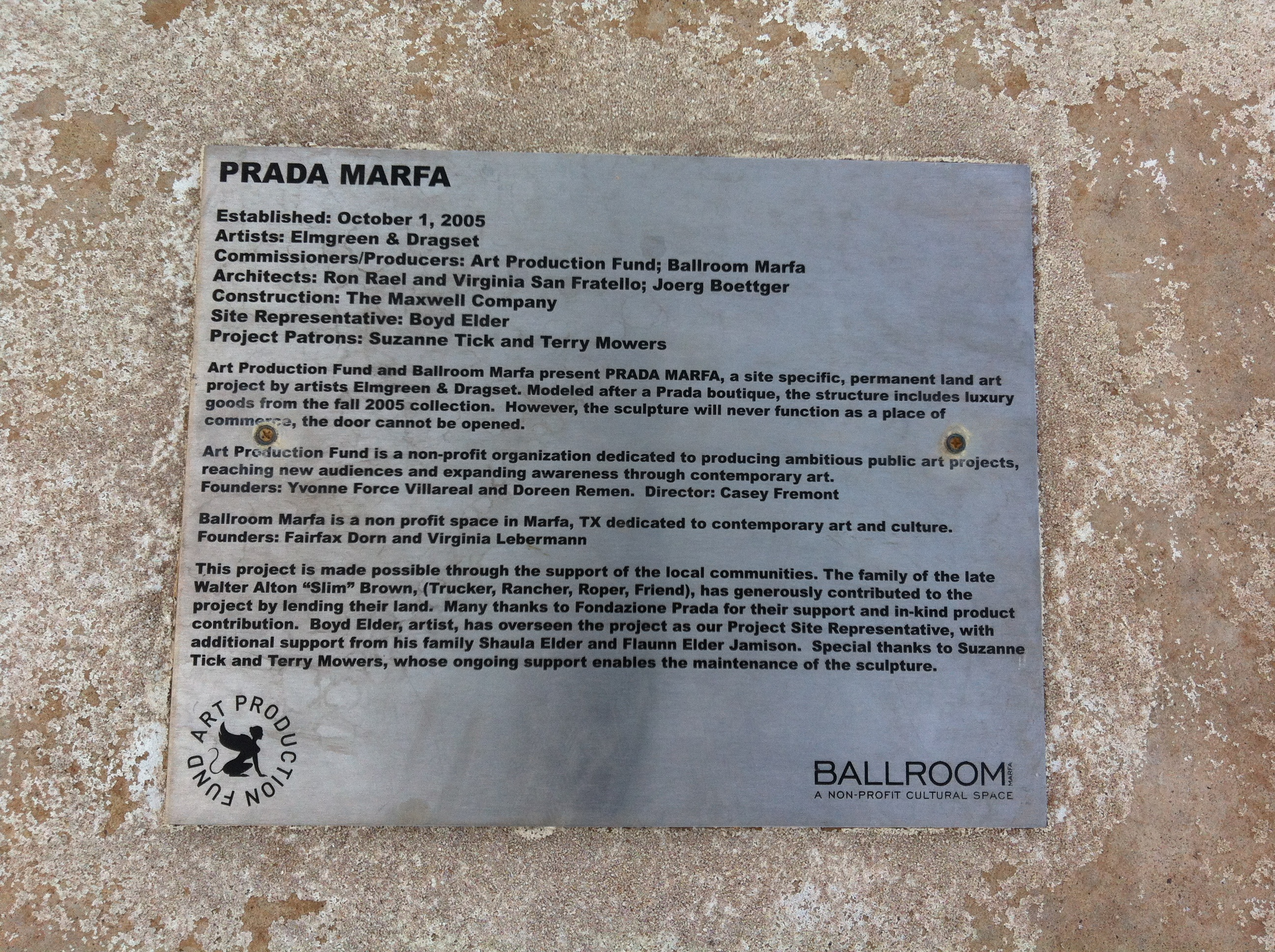
Prada Marfa plaque, March 2012

Designed to resemble a Prada store, the building is made of "adobe bricks, plaster, paint, glass pane, aluminum frame, MDF, and carpet." The installation's door is nonfunctional. On the front of the structure there are two large windows displaying actual Prada wares, shoes and handbags, picked out and provided by Miuccia Prada from the fall/winter 2005 collection; Prada allowed Elmgreen and Dragset to use the Prada trademark for this work. Elmgreen and Dragset originally had wanted to place the sculpture elsewhere and was interested in a "Prada Nevada", but failed to find support in the state. They were then helped by the New York-based Art Production Fund (APF), which connected the artists with Ballroom Marfa in Marfa, Texas, a center of contemporary art and culture. The installation was then placed at a location northwest of Marfa near Valentine, Texas, where a local artist, Boyd Elder, served as caretaker for the installation.

Prada had previously collaborated with Elmgreen and Dragset in 2001, when the artists attached signage to the Tanya Bonakdar Gallery in New York City with the false message "Opening soon—PRADA". Prada Marfa is located relatively close to Donald Judd's Chinati Foundation. The site-specificity of Prada Marfa invites for a comparison with other art movements such as minimalism and land art, which are equally dependent on the site where they are placed. Prada Marfa relies almost entirely on its context for its critical effect. The "sculptural Intervention" can be interpreted as criticism of consumerism, luxury branding and gentrification, but whether intentionally or not, it is also argued it reinforces the capitalist values it criticizes. Therefore, this work of art experienced a change of meaning and gained an ambivalent moment that the artists did not expect. Along a ledge that runs around the base of the building, hundreds of people have left business cards, weighed down by small rocks.

== Theft and vandalism ==
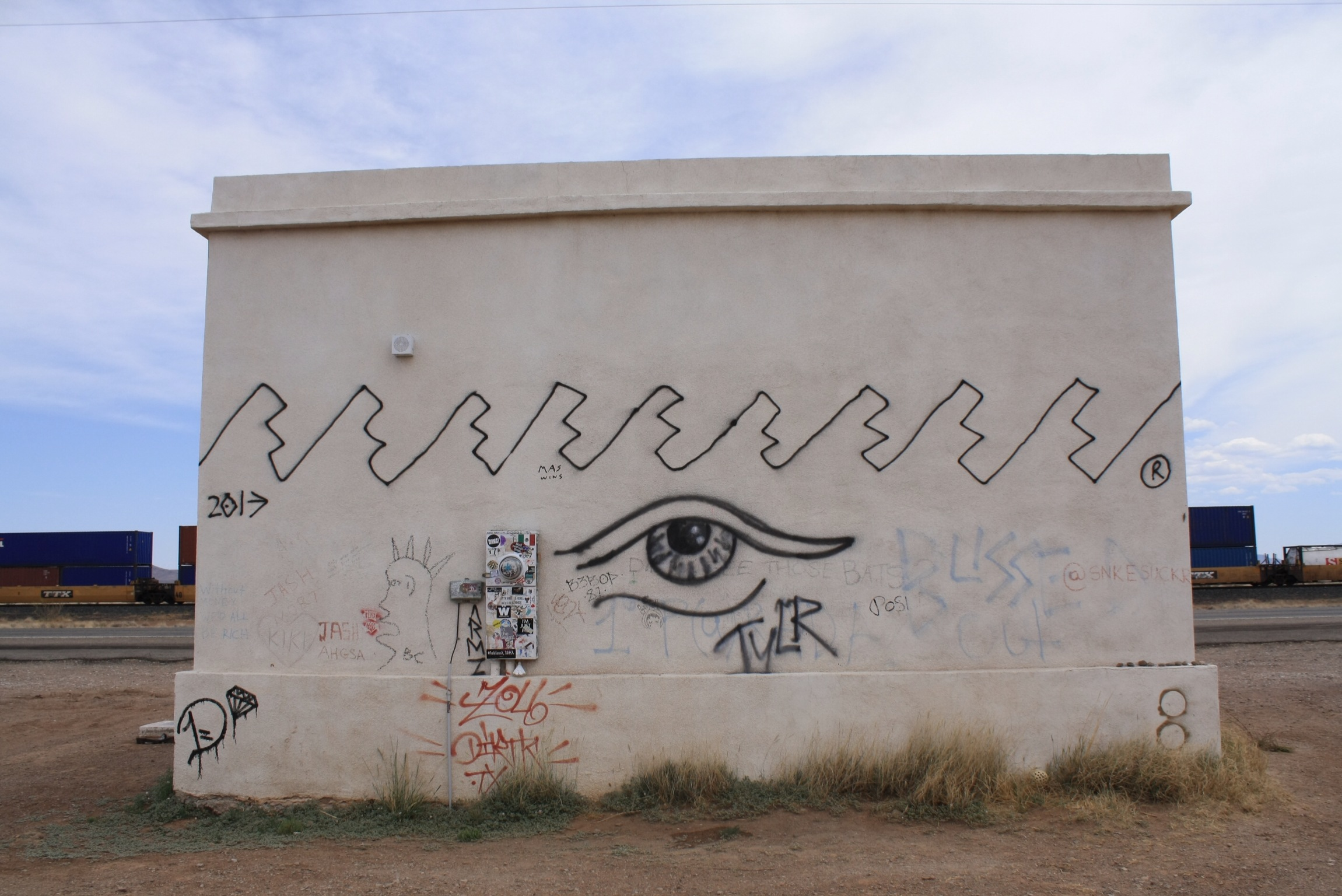
Graffiti on the back of Prada Marfa, May 2013

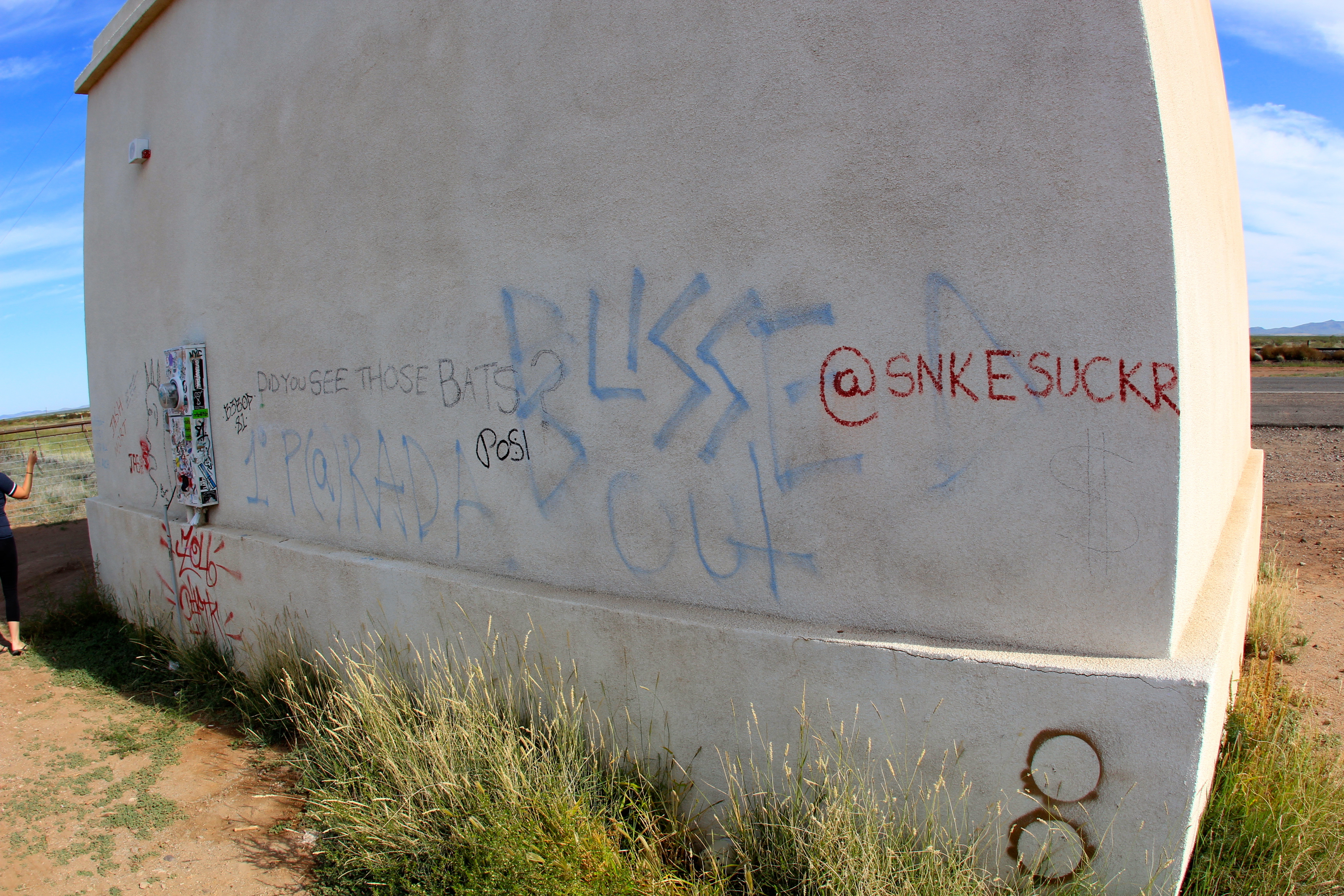
Graffiti on the back of Prada Marfa, October 2012

The night Prada Marfa formally opened, the building was broken into, its contents (six handbags and 14 right-footed shoes) stolen, and the words "Dumb" and "Dum Dum" spray-painted on the building's side walls. The sculpture was quickly repaired. The replacement contents conceal a security system to alert authorities if they are moved. The sculpture subsequently received extensive local and international press coverage.

In March 2014, vandals painted the building light blue, hung fake logos for Toms Shoes from the awnings, and posted a political manifesto on the door. Ballroom Marfa issued a statement decrying the vandalism and pledging to restore the site. A Texas artist, 32-year-old Joe Magnano (using the pseudonym 9271977), was subsequently arrested and tried. Magnano pleaded guilty to two counts of misdemeanor criminal mischief and agreed to pay Ballroom Marfa $10,700 in restitution as well as a $1,000 fine.

== Response from Texas Department of Transportation ==
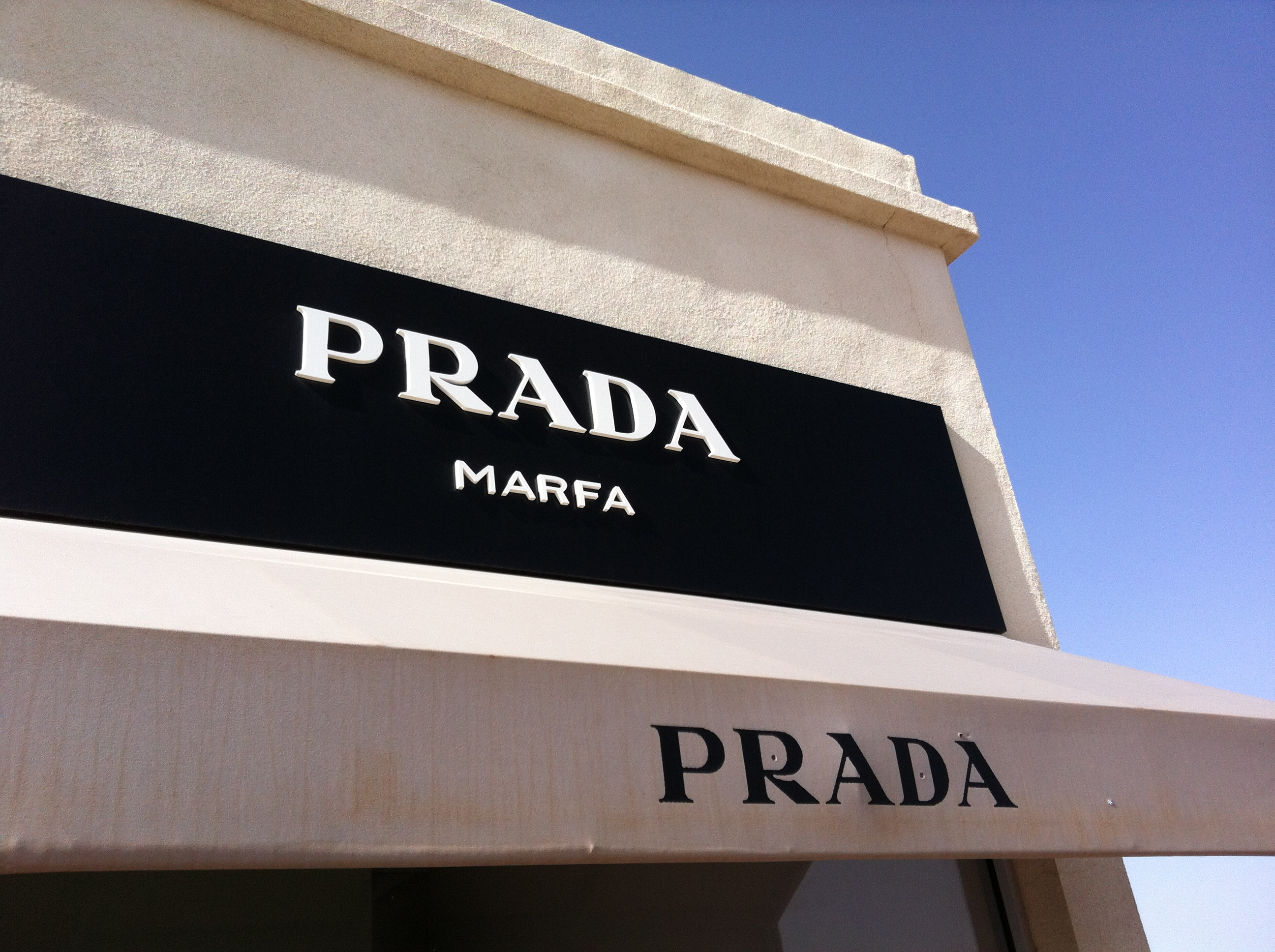
Prada Marfa storefront sign, March 2012

The installation remained unnoticed by the Texas Department of Transportation (TxDOT) until 2013, when Playboy erected a 40-foot-tall (12 m) neon bunny nearby along the same stretch of road, which attracted the attention of TxDOT to both installations. TxDOT considered both the Playboy neon bunny and the Prada sign on the Prada Marfa installation to be advertisements, and permits are required to display such signs along a US highway on unlicensed land according to the 1965 Highway Beautification Act. Both installations violated the permitted specifications for billboards, and a demand to remove the neon bunny was issued by the TxDOT, but no immediate decision was made for Prada Marfa.

Michael Elmgreen commented on the suggestion that Prada Marfa is an illegal advertisement for Prada: "There is no company behind the artwork. It was not commissioned by Prada [...] They never, ever asked me to do advertisement for them." In September 2014, TxDOT officials announced that the structure would be reclassified as a museum, with the Prada Marfa its only exhibit. This action exempts the structure from the same signage rules that forced the removal of the neon bunny installed by Playboy magazine.
