= Heather Phillipson =

British artist

Heather Phillipson is a British artist working in a variety of media including video, sculpture, electronic music, large-scale installations, online works, text and drawing. She was nominated for the Turner Prize in 2022. Her work has been presented at major venues internationally and she has received multiple awards for her artwork, videos and poetry, including the Film London Jarman Award in 2016. She is also an acclaimed poet whose writing has appeared widely online, in print and broadcast.

== Exhibitions ==
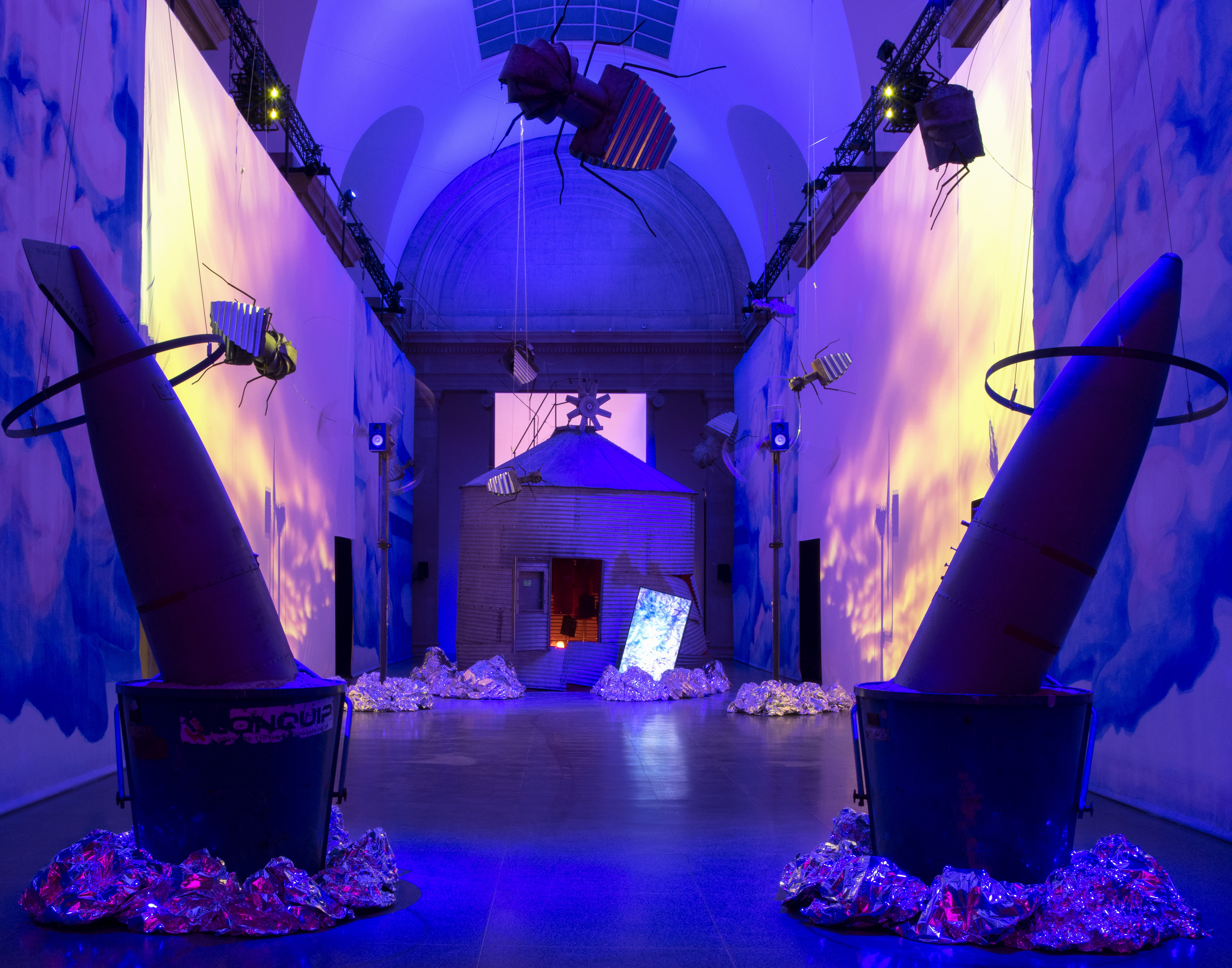
Heather Phillipson, RUPTURE NO 1: blowtorching the bitten peach, Duveen Galleries commission, Tate Britain, 2021

Phillipson has held solo exhibitions at major galleries and locations internationally, including the annual Duveen Galleries commission at Tate Britain in 2021 and the 13th commission for the Fourth Plinth, Trafalgar Square, where her sculpture The End was installed from 2020 to 2022.

Other notable solo exhibitions include: a major commission for the 80-metre-long unused platform at Gloucester Road Underground Station for Art on the Underground (2018), Baltic Centre for Contemporary Art Gateshead (in 2018 and 2013), Screens Series, New Museum, New York (2016), Whitechapel Gallery London (2016), Schirn Frankfurt (2015–16), Performa New York (2015) and Dundee Contemporary Arts (2014). In 2014 she designed the stage for the Serpentine Gallery's Extinction Marathon. She has also presented works at many major biennials and festivals including a commission for Frieze Projects at Frieze Art Fair, New York (2016), São Paulo Art Biennial (2016), the Athens Biennale (2018), and the Sharjah Biennial (2019).

Her live events, which involve music, video, objects and speech, have been presented at venues including Tate Britain, the Serpentine Gallery, Palais de Tokyo, Whitechapel Gallery and the Institute of Contemporary Arts in London. Her works are held in a number of public collections including Tate, the Arts Council Collection and Castello di Rivoli, Turin. In October 2021, Phillipson contributed to WWF's campaign, Art For Your World.

== Broadcast ==
Phillipson's videos have been screened on BBC Two and Channel 4 television and her audio collages and poems have been broadcast on BBC Radio 3 and BBC Radio 4.

In December 2023, Phillipson appeared in several Christmas special episodes of University Challenge on BBC Two, in which she captained a team of notable alumni from Middlesex University. The team included Lola Young, Baroness Young of Hornsey, comedian and actor Dan Renton Skinner, music journalist David Hepworth and architectural historian David Heathcote. Phillipson's team beat alumni from the University of Leeds and Bangor University in the heat and semi-finals, respectively, and went on to win against Corpus Christi College, Oxford in the season final.

== Early life and education ==
Heather Phillipson was born in 1978 in the borough of Haringey in North London and brought up in Greenwich, South East London. The youngest of three children, her mother was a social worker and feminist activist and her father a teacher, artist, jazz musician and writer. Phillipson and her siblings were raised with an interest in the arts and music and Phillipson, while still a child, was awarded Grade 7 from the ABRSM on both violin and piano. At the age of nine, Phillipson won a London-wide poetry competition for the borough of Lewisham. As a teenager, Phillipson and her family moved to West Wales, where Phillipson attended Ysgol Dyffryn Taf School. She later went on to study Art & Design at Pembrokeshire College in the town of Haverfordwest where she also worked part-time in a record shop, building up her collection and knowledge of UK dance and electronic music, which later informed her practice as a DJ, playing house, jungle and drum and bass. Phillipson went on to become active in the late-90s UK rave and free party scene. As Phillipson noted when interviewed on BBC Radio 3's Private Passions in 2020, this has had a significant impact on the sampling, rhythmic and tonal structures of her work.

== Personal life ==
Phillipson lives in Hackney, East London, where her studio is also based.

Since 2016, she has volunteered as a mentor with Arts Emergency, a UK-based charity working to increase access to the arts for 16-19-year-olds from disadvantaged backgrounds.

== Awards and nominations ==
- 2008: Eric Gregory Award for Poetry
- 2009: Faber New Poets Award
- 2013: Fenton Aldeburgh First Collection Prize (shortlist)
- 2013: Michael Murphy Memorial Prize (shortlist)
- 2014: Next Generation Poet
- 2016: Friends Prize for Literature, Poetry magazine, Chicago
- 2016: Film London Jarman Award for film and video art
- 2017: Selected for the Fourth Plinth, Trafalgar Square
- 2018: Ammodo Tiger Short Film Award, International Film Festival Rotterdam, European Short Film Award nomination from the European Film Academy
- 2022: Nominated for the Turner Prize

== Publications ==
Phillipson has published five volumes of poetry:

- Faber New Poets 3 (Faber & Faber, 2009)
- NOT AN ESSAY (Penned in the Margins, 2012)
- Instant-flex 718 (Bloodaxe Books, 2013)
- more flinching (Periplum Press, 2018)
- Whip-hot & Grippy (Bloodaxe Books, 2019)
