= Kukje Gallery =

Korean contemporary art gallery

Kukje Gallery (Korean: 국제갤러리) is a gallery in Samcheong-dong, Seoul and Suyeong-gu, Busan in South Korea. Founded in the 1982 by Lee Hyun-sook, it seeks to spotlight Korean contemporary art both domestically and abroad. Frieze called it "a pivotal cultural hub in Seoul, Korea since its inception...Committed to showcasing both international and Korean artists."

== History ==
Kukje Gallery was founded in 1982 by Lee. Originally, it sought to bring international artists to Korea, with exhibitions by artists like Louise Bourgeois and Jenny Holzer, but in the twenty-first century, it began pivoting in the opposite direction by showcasing Korean artists, such as Lotus L. Kang and Gala Porras-Kim, to the rest of the world.

In 2022, Kukje Gallery unveiled its third gallery space, designed by Brooklyn-based architecture firm SO-IL. It is made of concrete and covered in a metal mesh made out of five hundred thousand stainless steel rings "individually blasted with glass beads to achieve their silvery colour, and then washed at the local carwash."
