= Sprüth Magers =

Art gallery in London, Berlin and Los Angeles

Sprüth Magers is a commercial art gallery owned by Monika Sprüth and Philomene Magers, with spaces in London, Berlin, Los Angeles, and New York, and offices in Cologne, Hong Kong, and Seoul. The gallery represents over seventy artists and estates, including John Baldessari, George Condo, Peter Fischli & David Weiss, Andreas Gursky, Jenny Holzer, Barbara Kruger, David Ostrowski, David Maljkovic and Rosemarie Trockel.

== History ==
In February 1983, Monika Sprüth opened her first gallery in Cologne with a focus on female artists. Philomene Magers, a long-time friend of Sprüth's from Bonn, took over her mother Philomene Magers Sr.'s gallery in 1989 at the age of 24, following her mother's death. Previously, her mother had established the gallery in 1971 in the West German capital, focusing on showing work by young female artists like Rosemarie Trockel and conceptual artist Astrid Klein, as well as representing male artists such as Joseph Beuys and American sculptor Donald Judd. Emblematic of a female-focused perspective is Sprüth's publishing venture Eau de Cologne: a "magazine, featuring almost exclusively women artists and art practitioners – which she published, with accompanying exhibitions, three times between 1985 and 1989". Combining theoretical discourse with visual practice, Eau de Cologne "gave artists such as Trockel, Barbara Kruger, Jenny Holzer, Cindy Sherman, and Louise Lawler a European venue to pursue their own self-making and critical empowerment". The first two editions in 1985 and 1987 were edited solely by Sprüth and featured early work by Sherman and Kruger as cover art.

While Sprüth's interest and belief in the influence of women was a notable aspect of her gallery, she also represented conceptual artists Peter Fischli & David Weiss, photographers Andreas Gursky and Thomas Demand, and painters Andreas Schulze, George Condo, Axel Kasseböhmer, and Thomas Scheibitz. All of these artists are still represented by Sprüth and Magers.

It was also in Cologne that Philomene Magers opened her gallery in 1991, with a focus primarily on post-war figures including Donald Judd, Robert Morris, Dan Flavin, Ad Reinhardt, John Baldessari, Richard Artschwager, and Ed Ruscha.

Sprüth and Magers cooperated for many years before their complementary programs and shared interests led them to run the galleries together since 1998. They represented the German photographers Andreas Gursky and Thomas Demand and the American artists Cindy Sherman and Jenny Holzer. In 2015 Monika Sprüth and Philomene Magers were placed at number 13 in ArtReview's "Power 100" list of the 100 most influential people in the contemporary art world. More recently the gallery began representing younger artists such as Pamela Rosenkranz, David Ostrowski, Kaari Upson and Cao Fei, as well as the estates of Bernd and Hilla Becher, Craig Kauffman, Otto Piene and Hanne Darboven. The intention of the gallery is to show artists who have a long-term cultural significance. Kraftwerk was included in the gallery program due to their importance in music history and their visual understanding. Following their initial merger, Sprüth Magers expanded further with a gallery space in Munich and a London gallery in 2003, located on Berkeley Street in Mayfair first and on Grafton Street since 2007. The latest expansion of Sprüth Magers is an office in Seoul.

== Locations ==
Sprüth Magers has galleries in Berlin, Los Angeles, London, and New York, as well as offices in Cologne, Hong Kong, and Seoul.

In 2007, Sprüth Magers London moved to a new Mayfair location on Grafton Street where it remains. The gallery was named by a 2008 Evening Standard article as one of the "London Galleries to Watch". As author Ben Lewis describes, "With its 19th century carved wood and glass façade, Sprüth Magers gets my vote for the most beautiful gallery in London."

Central among the gallery's locations is the Berlin space, which opened in October 2008 and is located in the Mitte district. In Berlin, they chose a building that once belonged to the psychology department of Humboldt University. It is in a former dancehall on Oranienburger Strasse. Its inaugural show was "sculptures by the local Dresden-born artist Thomas Scheibitz, known for his colorful assemblages" and an exhibition by American artist George Condo.

In 2016, Sprüth Magers opened a U.S. location in Los Angeles with new work by American Conceptual artist John Baldesssari, a 14,000-square-foot, two-storey space designed by West Coast architects Pereira & Associates, across the street from the Los Angeles County Museum of Art. The space's interior was designed by architects Andreas Lechthaler and Botho von Senger und Etterlin.

== Artists represented ==
Sprüth Magers represents several living artists, including:

- John Bock
- Cao Fei
- George Condo (since 1984)
- Thomas Demand
- Philip-Lorca diCorcia
- Thea Djordjadze
- Lucy Dodd
- Sylvie Fleury
- Gilbert & George
- Andreas Gursky
- Jenny Holzer
- Gary Hume
- Anne Imhof (since 2021)
- Karen Kilimnik
- Astrid Klein
- Joseph Kosuth
- Kraftwerk
- Barbara Kruger
- David Lamelas
- Louise Lawler
- Anthony McCall
- Senga Nengudi
- David Ostrowski
- Michail Pirgelis
- Stephen Prina
- Jon Rafman
- Bridget Riley
- Pamela Rosenkranz
- Sterling Ruby
- Thomas Ruff
- Ed Ruscha
- Analia Saban
- Thomas Scheibitz
- Andreas Schulze
- Cindy Sherman
- Frank Stella
- Stephen Shore
- Lizzie Fitch/Ryan Trecartin
- Ryan Trecartin
- Rosemarie Trockel
- Nora Turato (since 2023)
- Marcel van Eeden
- John Waters
- Peter Fischli David Weiss (since 1983)
- Kara Walker
- Andro Wekua
- Andrea Zittel

In addition, the gallery manages various artist estates, including:

- Kenneth Anger
- Keith Arnatt
- Richard Artschwager
- John Baldessari
- Bernd & Hilla Becher
- Gretchen Bender
- Alighiero Boetti
- Hanne Darboven
- Robert Irwin
- Donald Judd
- Craig Kauffman
- Robert Morris
- Otto Piene
- Robert Therrien
- Kaari Upson

== Sources ==
1. Leitch, L. "The greats go head to head in The Times Modern Art 200", The Times — Times 2, 13 April 2009, pp. 2–4.
2. Princethal, N. "Jenny Holzer", After the Revolution. Women Who Transformed Contemporary Art. New York: Prestel, 2007, pp. 144–167.
3. Wright, B. "Art Business", Apollo, January 2009, p. 66.
