= Monika Sprüth =

German art dealer and gallerist

Monika Sprüth (born May 18, 1949 in Memmingen) is a German art dealer and co-founder of Sprüth Magers.

== Early life and education ==
Monika Sprüth graduated from high school in Landstuhl, Rhineland-Palatinate in 1968 and first studied architecture at the RWTH Aachen University between 1968 and 1975. She then worked as an urban planner in Oberhausen until 1980, later as a teacher of secondary school construction, maths and art in Cologne.

== Career ==
In 1983, she opened the Monika Sprüth Galerie in the Südstadt district of Cologne with an exhibition by Andreas Schulze. She initially exhibited young, at the time still unknown female artists such as Rosemarie Trockel, Cindy Sherman, Barbara Kruger and Jenny Holzer, whom she helped to achieve international recognition, "thus breaking the trend of the art market, which until then had been determined by male artists". Monika Sprüth is also instrumental in developing the early careers of artists such as Peter Fischli & David Weiss, Louise Lawler, Andreas Gursky, Thomas Demand, George Condo, Axel Kasseböhmer and Thomas Scheibitz.

Monika Sprüth associated the founding of her gallery with the concern to offer visibility to female artists. Between 1985 and 1989, this feminist position led to three exhibitions entitled Eau de Cologne, which focused on a female discourse on art. The exhibitions presented positions that dealt with the role of women, as in the works of Barbara Kruger, Cindy Sherman, Jenny Holzer, Louise Lawler, Gretchen Bender and Rosemarie Trockel. The magazine of the same name lent emphasis to the gallery's program: in the three issues of Eau de Cologne, Monika Sprüth, as editor, presented many German and American women artists as well as female protagonists who had a decisive influence on the art and culture of the time in the form of portraits, picture series, conversations, and texts. The covers of the three magazines were designed by Barbara Kruger, Cindy Sherman and Rosemarie Trockel.

In 1988, Monika Sprüth presented two group exhibitions entitled Das Licht von der anderen Seite I+II. The first exhibition with the subtitle Malerei united works by George Condo, Walter Dahn, Axel Kasseböhmer, Albert Oehlen, Salvo, Andreas Schulze and other painters. The second exhibition, subtitled Photographie, featured works by Richard Prince, Cindy Sherman, Jeff Wall, Fischli/Weiss, John Baldessari, Ed Ruscha and Bernd and Hilla Becher, among others. These exhibitions showed central postmodern positions of new American and German conceptual painting and photography.

Together with Philomene Magers, Monika Sprüth founded the gallery Sprüth Magers, Cologne in 1998. This was followed by branches in Munich (2000), London (2003) and Berlin (2008). The exhibition activities in Cologne and Munich were discontinued with the move to Berlin (2008). In 2016, Monika Sprüth and Philomene Magers opened a gallery space in Los Angeles and an office in Hong Kong. In 2022, another gallery space followed in New York. In addition to artists already mentioned, Sprüth Magers represents Alighiero Boetti, Thea Djordjadze Cao Fei, Cyprien Gaillard, Karen Kilimnik, Kraftwerk, Reinhard Mucha, David Ostrowski, Bridget Riley, Sterling Ruby, Ryan Trecartin, Andro Wekua and Kara Walker, among others.

== Other activities ==
- Monika Sprüth is an appointed member of the German Academy for Soccer Culture.
- In 2017, Monika Sprüth exhibited her personal art collection at the MEWO-Kunsthalle in her native town of Memmingen with the exhibition Never Enough: Monika Sprüth und die Kunst.

== Recognition ==
Since 2009, Monika Sprüth, together with Philomene Magers, has been included in the "Power 100 List" of the international magazine ArtReview among the 100 most influential people in the art business, most recently in 30th place in 2022. In 2014, The Guardian named her in their "Movers and makers: the most powerful people in the art world". Tobias Timm describes Monika Sprüth and Philomene Magers in Die Zeit "as the most successful female gallery owners in the world." Max Hollein, director of the Metropolitan Museum of Art, summarizes the gallery owner's activities in Bilanz in December 2016: "What is almost more impressive is how long and continuously the gallery has successfully worked with the artists, and how they, in turn, have remained perpetually loyal to the gallery [...]".

== Honors ==
- 2019: Order of Merit of Berlin
- 2022: ART COLOGNE Prize
