= Rubell Museum =

Art museum in Miami and Washington, D.C.

- Former name: Rubell Family Collection
- Established: 1993; 33 years ago
- Location: Miami, Florida, and Washington, D.C.
- Type: Art museum
- Collections: Contemporary art
- Collection size: 7400
- Founders: Don and Mera Rubell
- Director: Juan Roselione-Valadez
- Architects: Selldorf Architects (Miami); Beyer Blinder Belle (Washington, D.C.)
- Website: rubellmuseum.org

The Rubell Museum, formerly the Rubell Family Collection, is a private contemporary art museum with locations in the Allapattah neighborhood of Miami, Florida, and the Southwest Waterfront neighborhood of Washington, D.C. Opened to the public in 1993 and formerly housed in a warehouse in the Wynwood Art District, the museum and its collection were developed by Mera and Don Rubell, Miami-based art collectors who have played a significant role in the city's development as a center of the international contemporary art market. The museum relocated to a significantly larger campus in Miami and opened a campus in Washington in 2019 and 2022, respectively.

== History ==
=== Origins ===
Don and Mera Rubell married in 1964 and began collecting art while living in New York City by setting aside money each month from Mera's salary as a teacher while Don attended medical school. Don's brother Steve Rubell, a co-owner of the nightclub Studio 54, died in 1989 leaving the couple a significant inheritance that expanded their ability to purchase and showcase art. They continued to finance their art collection with investments in hotels in South Florida.

=== Rubell Family Collection, Wynwood (1993–2019) ===
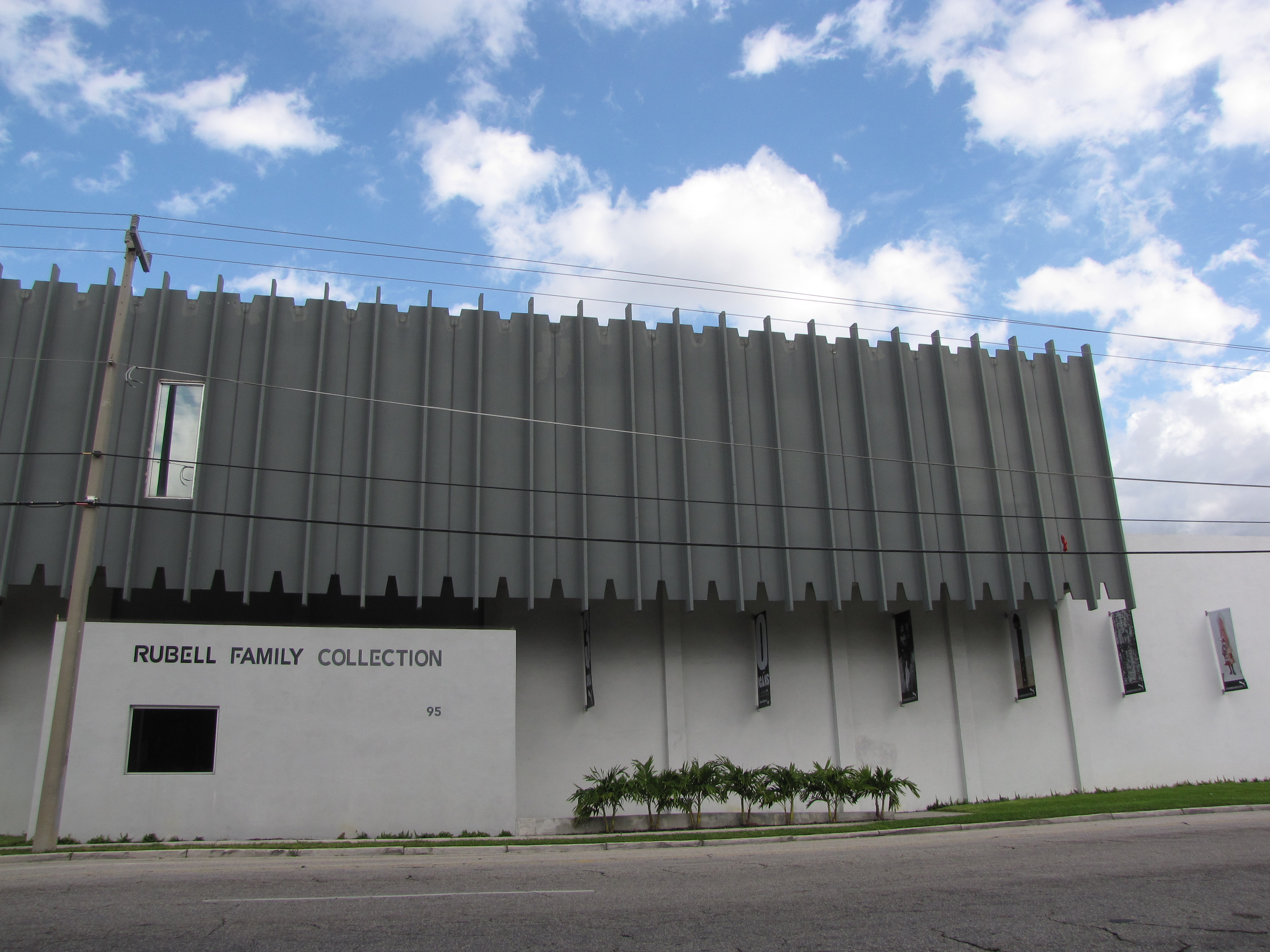
The Rubell Family Collection in its former space in Wynwood, in 2009

In 1993, the Rubells opened their private collection to the public as the Rubell Family Collection in a building formerly used by the Drug Enforcement Administration in the Wynwood neighborhood of Miami. The collection's presence in the neighborhood helped spur further development, with other private collections, galleries, and art-focused businesses moving to the area in the following years; the Rubell family was also successful in helping lobby Art Basel to host an edition of the art fair in the Miami area, which would eventually become Art Basel Miami Beach. The original building was renovated in 2004 by Miami architect Allan Shulman. Juan Roselione-Valadez was appointed director of the Miami museum in 2010.

=== Rubell Museum, Allapattah (2019–present) ===
In 2019, the collection relocated from the Wynwood neighborhood to a new site in the Allapattah neighborhood and was renamed the Rubell Museum. The new facility consists of six former industrial buildings redesigned by Selldorf Architects and features 40 galleries with 100,000 square feet of gallery space, a library, a restaurant, a performance space, and a bookstore. The facility was originally purchased by the museum as a new storage location, but the size of the site inspired museum leadership to utilize it for a larger, more public-focused museum facility. The expansion was funded by the sale of the collection's previous space in Wynwood; developers purchased the former Rubell property (along with several other adjoining properties) for a reported $53 million in 2022.

=== Rubell Museum DC (2022–present) ===
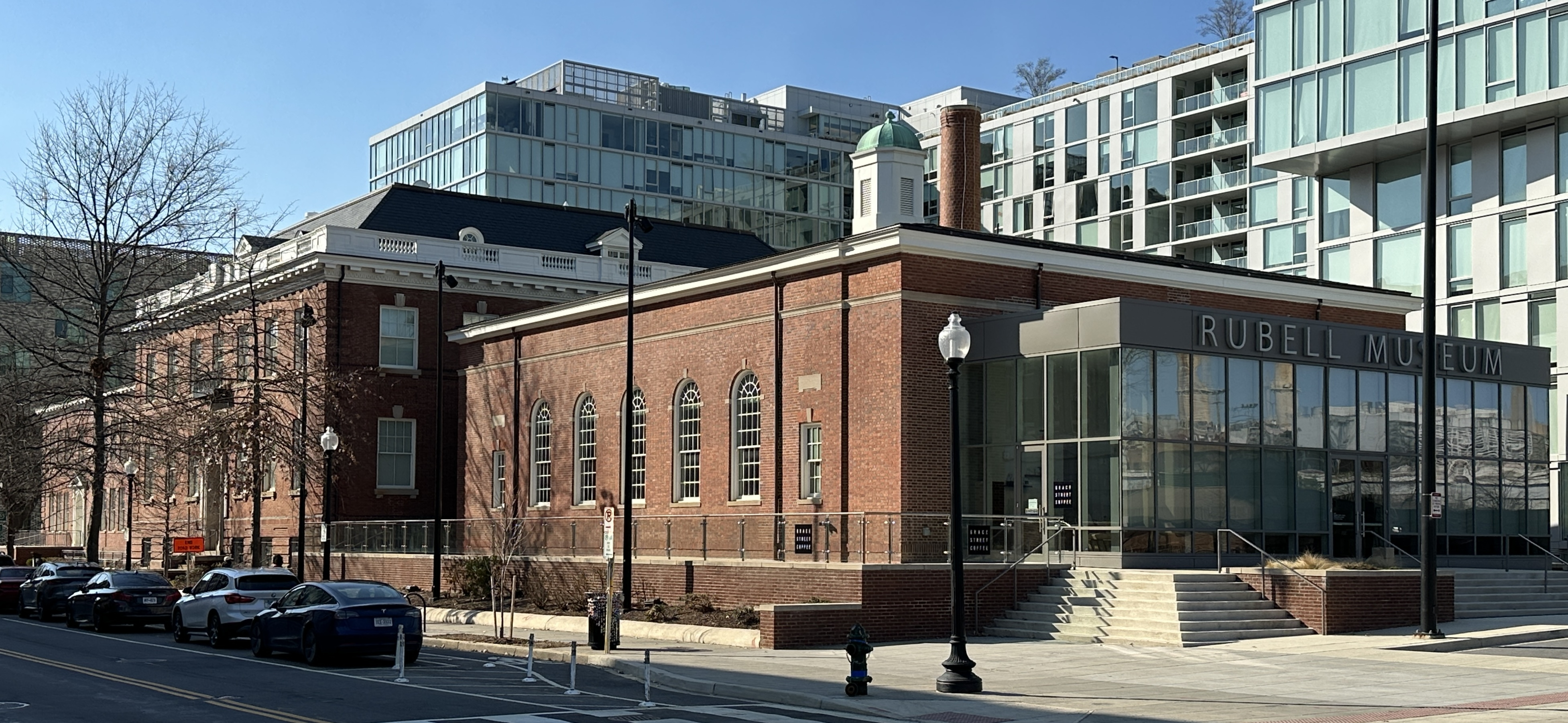
The Rubell Museum DC in 2026

In 2022, the Rubell announced the opening of a second museum location inside the renovated Randall Junior High School building in the Southwest Waterfront neighborhood of Washington, D.C., less than one mile directly south of the National Mall. The Rubells originally purchased the historic building in 2010 from the Corcoran Gallery of Art, later hiring Beyer Blinder Belle to refurbish and renovate the school building for the new museum, and partnering with Lowe to construct a 492-unit apartment building behind the museum. Caitlin Berry, former director of Marymount University's Cody Gallery of Art, was named director of the D.C. museum in August 2022. The second location, which is free to residents of Washington, opened in October 2022 and features 32,000 square feet of gallery space and a bookstore.

Berry left the D.C. museum in early 2024. Roselione-Valadez told The Washington Post that the museum had no immediate plans to rehire for the D.C. director position but that the institution was committed to staying in Washington long-term, saying "We plan on being there for at least 100 years."

== Collection and programs ==
The Rubell houses over 7,400 works by more than 1,000 artists. Don and Mera Rubell have been noted for their intensive approach to evaluating art to acquire for their collection, which includes multiple studio visits and interviews with artists, often over a period of multiple months and years. The collection has been noted for its strong holdings of art by African American, Latin American, and Asian artists, and the Rubells have been recognized for investing early in emerging artists, many of whom would go on to become widely known.

The collection includes works by a wide range of contemporary artists, including Nina Chanel Abney, Hernan Bas, Jean-Michel Basquiat, George Condo, Marlene Dumas, Katharina Fritsch, Robert Gober, Keith Haring, He Xiangyu, Damien Hirst, Jenny Holzer, Anselm Kiefer, Jeff Koons, Barbara Kruger, Yayoi Kusama, Kerry James Marshall, Takashi Murakami, Oscar Murillo, Cady Noland, Sherrie Levine, Catherine Opie, Celia Paul, Richard Prince, Sterling Ruby, Charles Ray, Cindy Sherman, Rosemarie Trockel, Kara Walker, and Kehinde Wiley.

Since 2011, the museum has hosted an artist residency program that is recognized as one of the most prestigious residencies in the country. Past artists-in-residence include Sterling Ruby, Amoako Boafo, and Lucy Dodd.

In 2024, the Rubell Museum collaborated with notable theater director Michel Hausmann and the Miami New Drama theater company, in "The Museum Plays". An immersive theater experience that served as an interface to part of the museum's collection. The project consisted of a series of short-format plays, each inspired by (and performed adjacent to) a specific artwork within the museum's galleries with the goal of offering visitors an innovative way of engaging with the exhibits. The plays were commissioned from playwrights Hannah Benitez, Harley Elias, Rogelio Martinez, Carmen Pelaez, Marco Ramirez, and Aurin Squire, who drew inspiration from works by artists Alfonso Gonzalez Jr., Jenna Gribbon, Glenn Ligon, Kaari Upson, and Kehinde Wiley. This collaboration showcased an initiative for the promotion of interdisciplinary approaches to art, and towards enhancing visitor experience through creative programming.

== Exhibitions ==
The Rubell has staged dozens of exhibitions, many of which have gone on to travel to venues across the country. In 2011 the Rubell's exhibition 30 Americans began touring, stopping first at the North Carolina Museum of Art in Raleigh. 30 Americans, a show focused on art by African-American artists from the museum's collection, has since toured to over a dozen museums and remained on tour as of 2022.

The opening exhibition in the Rubell's D.C. museum, What's Going On (2022), paid homage to Marvin Gaye, who had attended the former school that the museum is located in.

== Reception ==
Writing in the Miami New Times in 2005 about the original museum, Alfredo Triff said "There are other world-class art collections in this city, but none is housed or displayed with such consistency, attention to detail, and outreach programming as the Rubell Family Collection." Sara Liss of Condé Nast Traveler described the museum after its reopening in Allapattah as "intimate but ambitious, with daring works and an impressive caliber of artists on display."

Writing for Artnet News about the museum's D.C. expansion, Kriston Capps said "the District hasn't had an institution like the Rubell Museum in years, one that's literally and figuratively oriented toward the city, not the National Mall," praising the museum's focus on art and artists tackling issues relevant to residents of Washington. Critic Philip Kennicott, reviewing the opening show at the D.C. museum for The Washington Post, wrote that "The new museum gets almost all the intangibles of a museum experience right: the pacing, the juxtapositions, the flow, the light. Amid the sobering politics are moments of radiance and poetry," and "Right from the start, the Rubell Museum DC has found its substantial niche in the capital area's museum ecosystem."

In 2015, the Rubell was questioned by the US Senate Finance Committee along with several other private museums over its nonprofit tax status. The Rubell, along with The Broad, Glenstone, Pier 24, and seven other museums, were sent letters by committee chairman Senator Orrin Hatch that read, in part: "Some private foundations are operating museums that offer minimal benefit to the public while enabling donors to reap substantial tax advantages." The investigation came after reporting in The New York Times questioned whether high-value families and individuals were investing money in art and private museums as a form of tax shelter.
