= David Ostrowski =

German painter, born 1981

- Born: 1981; Cologne
- Education: Kunstakademie Düsseldorf
- Known for: Painting
- Movement: Contemporary art
- Website: david-ostrowski.com

David Ostrowski (born 1981 in Cologne, Germany) is a German painter. Ostrowski studied at Kunstakademie Düsseldorf under Albert Oehlen. He is a Professor of Painting at the State Academy of Fine Arts Karlsruhe since 2022. He is the grandson of Krystyna Żywulska. He lives and works in Cologne, Germany.

== Work ==
In his paintings, Ostrowski uses a restricted range of materials from his studio, including canvas, primer, emulsion, spray paint, and found objects like paper, cardboard, and tape. The works are casual, often monochrome, and characterized by a process that combines intuitive gestures with elements of chance and error. Ostrowski’s approach avoids traditional pictorial conventions and his paintings are often left open to interpretation, with titles such as F suggesting ambiguity. Ostrowski’s work has been described to focus on the exploration of emptiness within the context of painting.

== Awards ==
- 2012 Studio programme Kölnischer Kunstverein und Imhoff-Stiftung, Cologne, Germany

== Solo Exhibitions ==
- 2026: The Critic, Kunstverein Heilbronn
- 2026: Test, The Perimeter, London
- 2025: Let me put it this way, Aranya Art Center, Beidaihe, China
- 2024: Parliament, Sprüth Magers, New York
- 2023: Leeres Wasser (Anti Drawings), Fig., Tokyo
- 2024: Concerned with things as their own composition, Ramiken, New York
- 2021: So kalt kann es nicht sein / It can't be that cold, Sprüth Magers, Berlin
- 2020: Lady Helen, Lady Helen, London (with Angharad Williams)
- 2020: POGŁOS / OVERTONE, Avant-Garde Institute, Warsaw (with Tobias Spichtig)
- 2020: Lieber Nackt als Gefühlsleben, Jir Sandel, Copenhagen
- 2020: Menschen, Bilder, Emotionen / 사람, 그림, 감정, Leeahn Gallery, Seoul
- 2019: Political Paintings, Sundogs, Paris
- 2019: Political Correction, Piece Unique, Cologne
- 2018: The Thin Red Line, Sprüth Magers, London
- 2018: The Warsaw Pavilion, Wschód, Warsaw
- 2017: DONT, Halle 9 Kirowwerk, Leipzig
- 2017: Bei mir geht es in den Keller hoch, Blueproject Foundation, Barcelona
- 2016: To Lose, Leopold-Hoesch-Museum, Düren (with Michail Pirgelis)
- 2015: The F Word, Arken Museum, Copenhagen
- 2015: I want to die Forever, Kunstraum Innsbruck
- 2014: How To Do Things Left, Rubell Museum, Miami
- 2014: Just do it, Fondazione Sandretto Re Rebaudengo, Turin
- 2013: F, Artothek, Cologne

== Group Exhibitions ==
- 2023: The Sky is Thin. Drawings, Standard Oslo
- 2023: Watercolours, Chapter III, XYZcollective, Tokyo
- 2022: Tiere, Catherine Zeta, Cologne
- 2021: NOTHINGTOSEENESS, Akademie der Künste, Berlin
- 2021: architektura, Fuhrwerkswaage, Cologne
- 2020: One Moment Please, Triest, New York
- 2020: Who am I - VOL I, Mélange, Cologne
- 2020: Il Ghirigoro, Pio Pico, Los Angeles
- 2019: Dicke Luft, Galerie Bernhard, Zurich
- 2019: Bad Actors, KARST, Plymouth
- 2019: RAW, DuMont Kunsthalle, Cologne
- 2019: 3 Zimmer, Küche, Bad, Braunsfelder, Cologne
- 2018: TRANCE, Aïshti Foundation, Beirut
- 2017: Bild des Tages, plət, Amsterdam
- 2017: THE ART SHOW – Art of the New Millennium, Museum of Modern Art, Gunma
- 2016: Fasi Lunari, Fondazione Carriero, Milan
- 2015: Full of Peril and Weirdness: Painting as a Universalism, M Woods Museum, Beijing
- 2014: Ordinary Freaks, Halle für Kunst & Medien, Graz
- 2014: Beware Wet Paint, Institute of Contemporary Arts, London

== Public collections ==
The works of David Ostrowski are held, among others, in the following public collections:

- Aïshti Collection, Beirut
- Arken Museum Collection, Copenhagen
- Braunsfelder Family Collection, Cologne
- Colección Jumex, Mexico City
- Danjuma Collection, London
- De la Cruz Collection, Miami
- Fondazione Sandretto Re Rebaudengo, Turin
- Los Angeles County Museum of Art, Los Angeles
- Louis Vuitton Collection, Paris
- Marciano Art Foundation, Los Angeles
- Moderna Museet, Stockholm
- Museum of Old and New Art, Berriedale
- Olbricht Collection, Berlin
- Rubell Museum, Miami
- Sammlung Goetz, Munich
- Sammlung Scharpff, Bonn
- Sammlung Philara, Düsseldorf
- Syz Collection, Switzerland
- Taguchi Art Collection, Tokyo
- Tel Aviv Museum, Tel Aviv
- Zabludowicz Collection, London

=== Bibliography ===
- Leeres Wasser (Anti Drawings), Verlag der Buchhandlung Walther König, Cologne, 2023. ISBN 978-3-7533-0450-2
- Concerned with things as their own composition, Verlag der Buchhandlung Walther König, Cologne, 2023. ISBN 978-3-7533-0372-7
- Chuzpe, Weinspach, Cologne, 2021
- So kalt kann es nicht sein / It can’t be that cold, Verlag der Buchhandlung Walther König, Cologne, 2021. ISBN 978-3-7533-0092-4
- Poglos / Overtone (with Tobias Spichtig), Avant-Garde Institute, Warsaw, 2021
- Time & Life (with Magnus Frederik Clausen), Jir Sandel, Copenhagen, 2021. ISBN 978-87-92332-12-7
- Menschen, Bilder, Emotionen, Leeahn Gallery / Sprüth Magers, Seoul, 2020. ISBN 9788995924846
- 3 Zimmer, Küche, Bad (with Andreas Schulze, Sophie von Hellermann), Braunsfelder, Cologne, 2019. ISBN 978-3-947839-07-0
- I strongly object, Weinspach, Cologne, 2019. ISBN 978-3-9819124-4-9
- The thin red line, Mousse Publishing, London, 2018. ISBN 978-88- 6749-366-1
- DON’T/Conscious Decadence (with Nan Goldin & Galileo Chini), Halle 9 Kirowwerk, Leipzig, 2018
- Nothing Happened / To Lose (with Michail Pirgelis), Verlag der Buchhandlung Walther König, Cologne, 2018. ISBN 978-3-86335-985-0
- I want to die Forever, Verlag der Buchhandlung Walther König, Cologne, 2018. ISBN 978-3-86335-896-9
- The F Word, ARKEN Museum of Modern Art, Copenhagen, 2015. ISBN 978-8-7787-5104-1
- How to do things left, Rubell Family Collection, Miami, 2014. ISBN 978-0991177035
- Even the most beautiful woman ends at her feet, Meurer Verlag, Cologne, 2013. ISBN 978-3-940312-04-4
- F Paintings, Peres Projects, Berlin, 2013. ISBN 978-3-00-044189-9
- Dann lieber nein, Figge von Rosen Galerie, Cologne, 2012
- Ostrowski, David / Randt, Leif: Shake Your Tree, Nr. 4, Berlin, 2012
- Die Lügnerin (with Philip Seibel), FORMAT:C, Düsseldorf, 2011
- Hulk vs. Hulk (with David Fintrop), Acapulco, Düsseldorf, 2007

== See also ==
- Ostrowski, Polish surname
