= Andreas Schulze (artist) =

German painter (born 1955)

Andreas Schulze (born 1955) is a German painter.

== Early life and education ==
Schulze was born in Hanover. From 1978 through 1983, Schulze attended the Kunstakademie Düsseldorf, where he studied under the painter Dieter Krieg.

== Career and work ==
Andreas Schulze first began showing alongside neo-expressionist artists in the 1980s, although his work was considerably less gestural than that of his contemporaries. The artist instead opted for more rounded forms, which he used to create a playful, humorous style of figuration. Typical subjects included the contents interior spaces – such as pillows, lamps, and furniture – which he merged with more ominous abstraction. Another significant aspect of his practice is the construction of immersive installations, which include painted walls and floors, objects of his own design, and found furniture.

In 1985, shortly after he began exhibiting, Schulze established a relationship with the gallerist Monika Sprueth, whom he continues to work with. Schulze is represented by Team Gallery in New York and Sprüth Magers in Cologne, Berlin, London and Los Angeles.
