= Pamela Rosenkranz =

Swiss multimedia artist (born 1979)

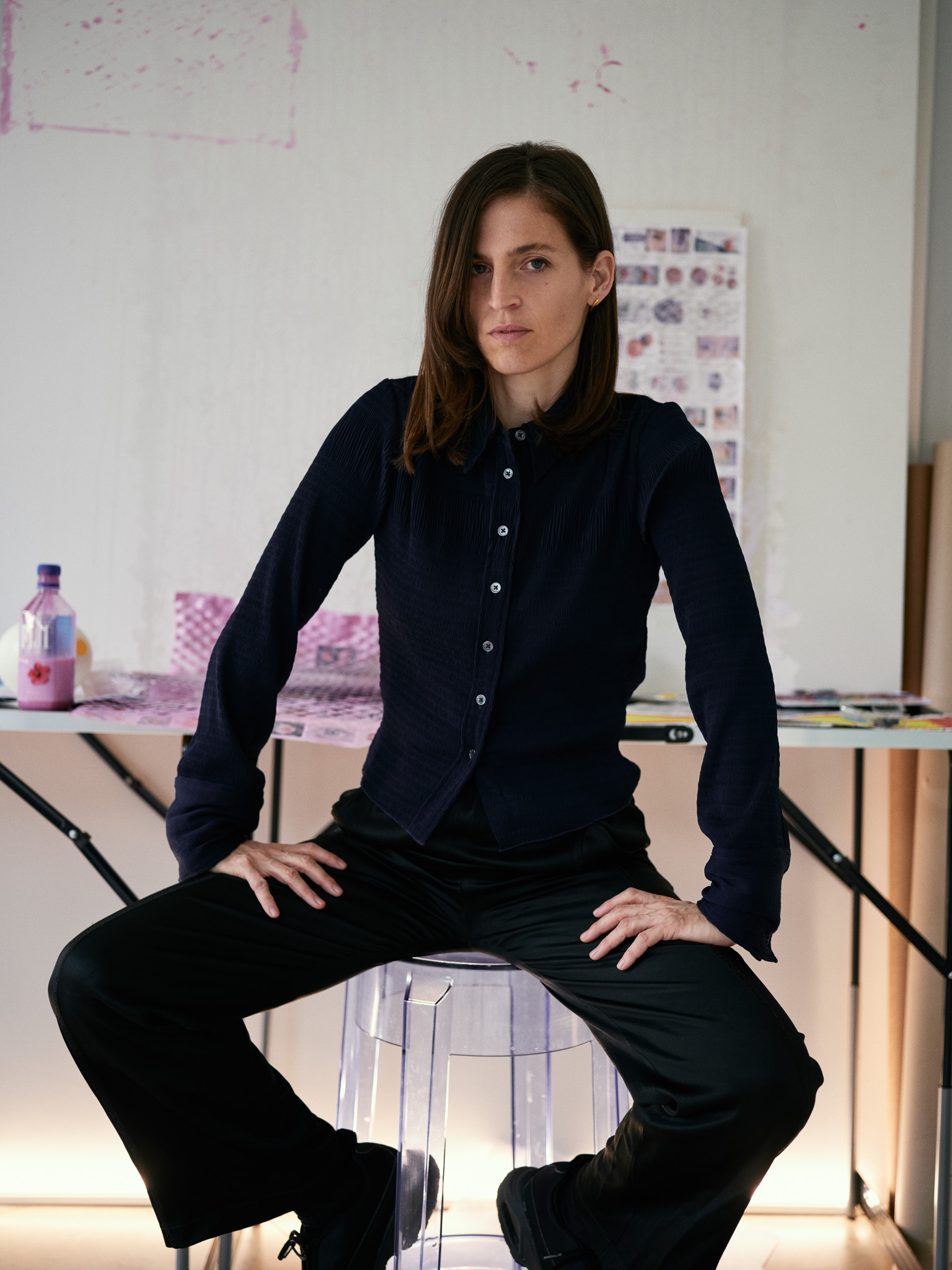
- Pamela Rosenkranz, 2024
- Born: June 5, 1979 (age 46); Altdorf, Uri, Switzerland
- Known for: Conceptual art, installation art

Pamela Rosenkranz (born 1979 in Altdorf, Uri, Switzerland) is a Swiss multimedia artist who uses light and liquid to demonstrate her concepts along with performance, sculpture, painting, and installation art. Her work explores ideas and concepts of what it means to be human, its ideologies, emptiness and meaninglessness, as well as globalization and consumerism. She is represented by Karma International, Zurich / Los Angeles; Miguel Abreu Gallery, New York; and Sprüth Magers Berlin, London, and Los Angeles.

== Education and career ==
Rosenkranz graduated from the University of Zurich in 2005, and received her MFA from the Academy of Fine Arts, Bern, in 2010. In 2012, she completed an independent residency at the Rijksakademie in Amsterdam. Rosenkranz's aesthetic choices are often informed by her extensive research into fields ranging from marketing and medicine to philosophy and religion. Her use of use of glass, plastic water bottles, and liquid reflecting surfaces stems from her interest in physicality as evident in the 2015 exhibition Open Source: Art at the Eclipse of Capitalism. Shiny, reflective surfaces provide a way for Rosenkranz's work to establish physicality, and interact with their environments. The biological and medical implications of light are of importance to the artist, as light affects the human body. Water as a medium connotes purity and detoxification, however, more accurately the plastic bottles that deliver water harbor bacteria and colonies of hormones.

Having collaborated with Robin Mackay and Reza Negarestani, Rosenkranz's work is often framed in relation to Speculative Realism. Her institutional solo exhibitions in Geneva, New York, and Braunschweig were covered in a 2012 monograph entitled No Core.

== Exhibitions ==
While still a student at the Academy of Fine Arts, Bern, Rosenkranz participated in both the 5th Berlin Biennale and Manifesta 7, in Trentino, Italy. In 2010, the same year that she graduated with a master's degree, Rosenkranz exhibited solo at Centre d’Art Contemporain Geneve, and at Germany’s Kunstverein Braunschweig.

Rosenkranz's first solo exhibition at Miguel Abreu Gallery in 2012, "Because They Try to Bore Holes," collapsed art into its material elements.

In 2015, Rosenkranz exhibited Open Source: Art at the Eclipse of Capitalism. Later that year, she represented Switzerland at the Venice Biennale with an immersive installation of immaterial elements titled Our Product.

She exhibited Slight Agitation 2/4: Pamela Rosenkranz in 2017 at Fondazione Prada, Milan.

In 2018, Rosenkranz debuted Amazon Spirits (Green Blood) at Karma International in Zurich to explore the intersection between the Amazonian rainforest and amazon.com, Inc.

In her 2019 exhibition Evian Waters, Rosenkranz highlighted the chemical and natural components underlying notions of eternal youth and purity.

== Bibliography ==
- Rosenkranz, Pamela (2012). No Core. Zurich: JRP Ringier. ISBN 9783037643013.
- Rosenkranz, Pamela (2010). Our sun. Milan: Mousse Publishing. ISBN 9788896501061.
