= Philomene Magers =

German art dealer

Philomene Magers (born 1965) is a German art dealer and co-owner of Sprüth Magers in Berlin, London, and Los Angeles, along with Monika Sprüth.

== Career ==
The daughter of an art dealer in Bonn, Magers studied art history at LMU Munich. She opened her first gallery in Cologne in 1991.

In 2014, The Guardian named Magers in their "Movers and makers: the most powerful people in the art world".

== Personal life ==
Magers is married to film director and producer Jan Schmidt-Garre. They have two children, and live in Berlin.
