= George Condo =

American painter (born 1957)

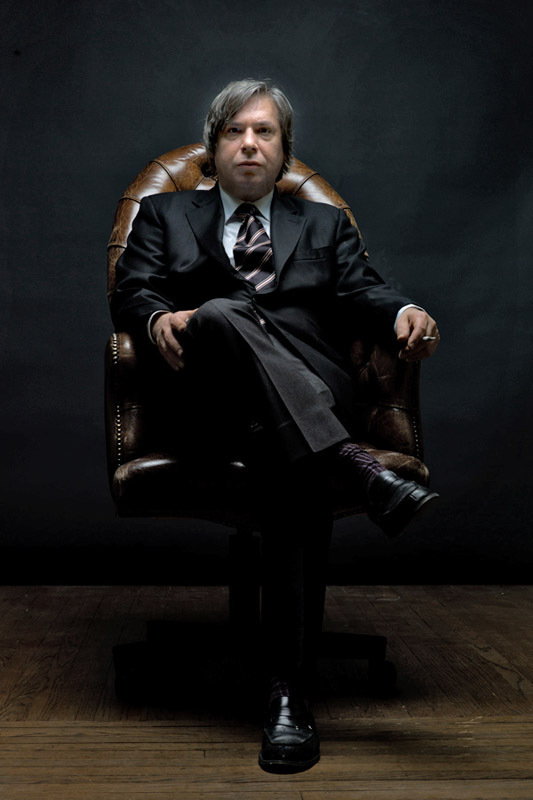
- Portrait of the artist by Sophie Caby in 2012
- Born: 1957; Concord, New Hampshire, US
- Education: University of Massachusetts Lowell
- Known for: Painting
- Spouse: Anna Achdian (m. 1989; div. 2015)
- Awards: Academy Award of the American Academy of Arts and Letters, Francis J. Greenberger Award

George Condo (born 1957) is an American visual artist who works in painting, drawing, sculpture, and printmaking. He lives and works in New York City.

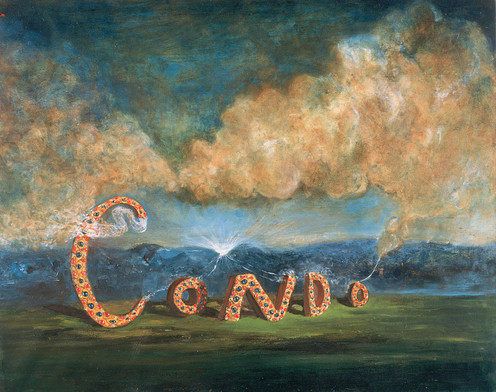
Condo's The Cloudmaker (1984)

Condo's Black Bulb (1987)

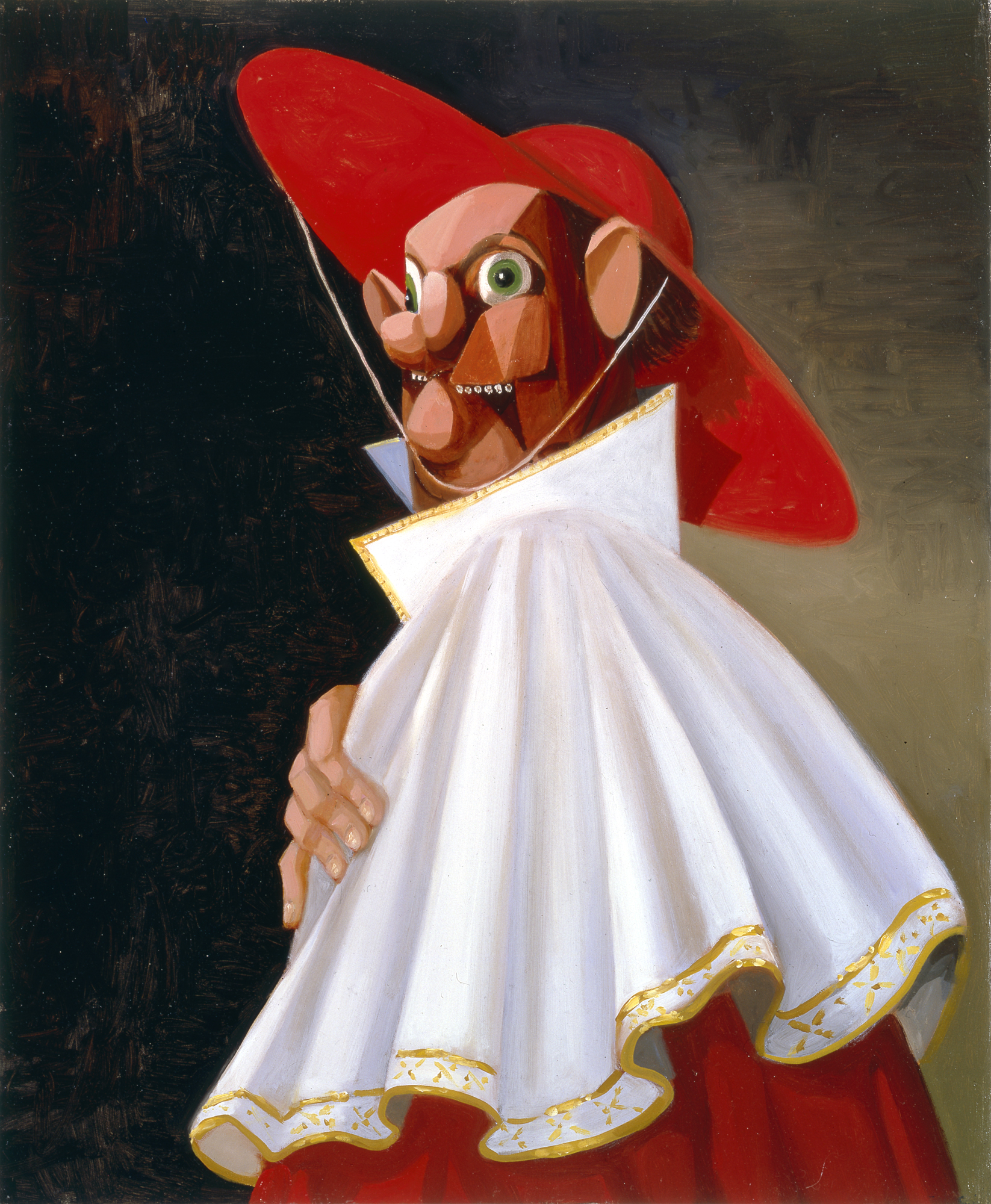
Condo's The Cracked Cardinal (2001)

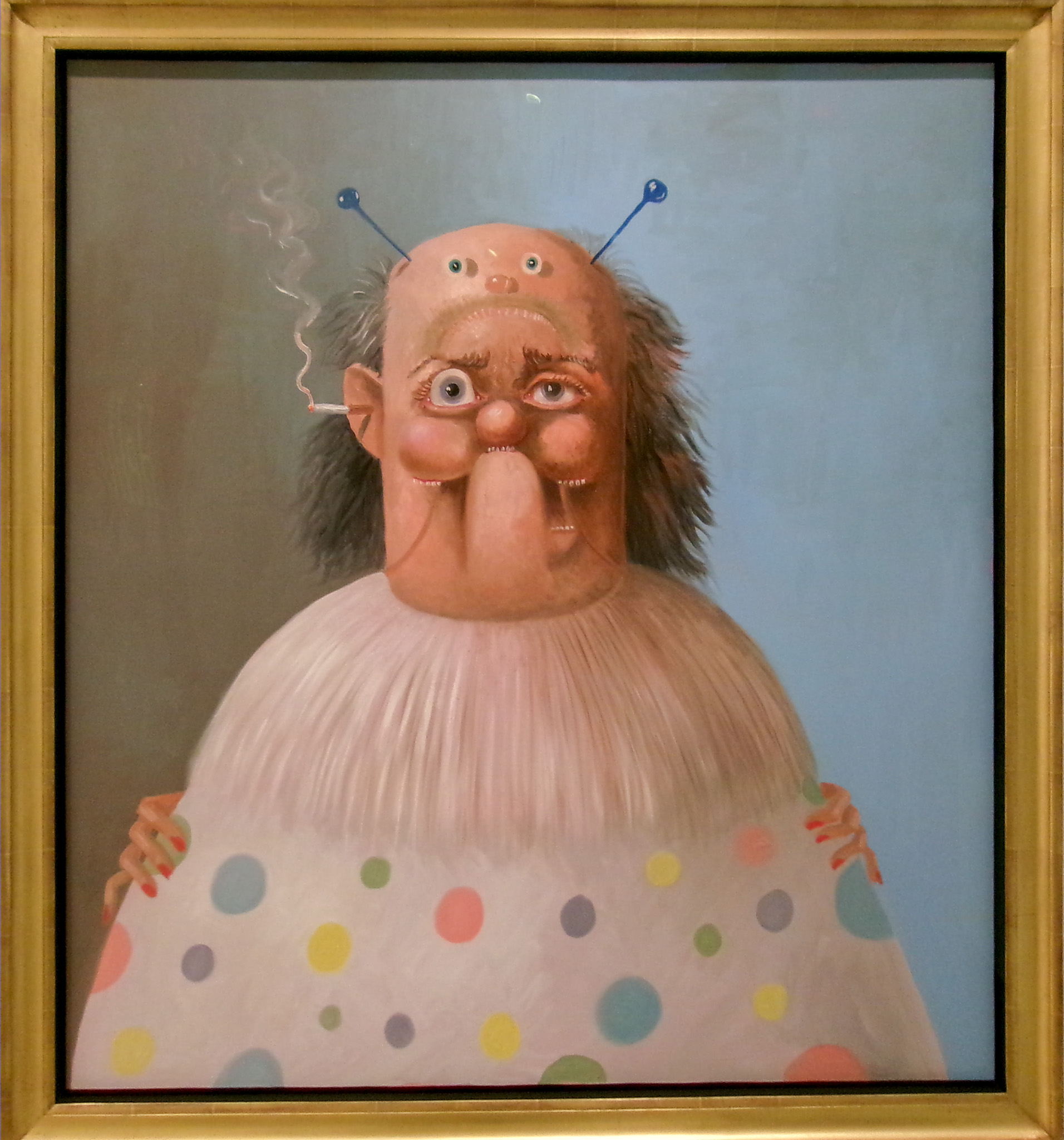
Condo's The Clown (2010), Memorial Art Gallery, Rochester, NY

== Early life ==
Condo was born in Concord, New Hampshire. He studied art history and music theory at the University of Massachusetts Lowell. Throughout his early life he studied guitar and music composition while pursuing his lifelong interest in painting and drawing. After two years at UMass Lowell, he moved to Boston, where he worked in a silk screen shop and joined the proto-synth/punk band The Girls as a bassist, with abstract painter Mark Dagley, avant-garde musician Daved Hild, and Robin Amos, founding member of Cul de Sac. Their only single, "Jeffrey I Hear You"/"Elephant Man" (1979) was produced by David Thomas of Pere Ubu. Condo met Jean-Michel Basquiat in 1979 when Basquiat's band Gray opened for the Girls at the downtown nightclub Tier 3. After this meeting Condo moved to Ludlow Street in New York City to pursue his career as an artist. He became a founding member of the punk/blues band Hi Sheriffs of Blue in 1980.

== Work ==
When he emerged in the East Village art scene in the early 1980s, Condo coined the term Artificial Realism, "the realistic representation of that which is artificial", to describe his hybridization of traditional European Old Master painting with a sensibility informed by American pop. Along with Jean-Michel Basquiat and Keith Haring, Condo was instrumental in the international revival of painting from the 1980s onward. His work has influenced many artists of his and the subsequent generation, including Nigel Cooke, Sean Landers, John Currin, Lisa Yuskavage and Glenn Brown.

The first public exhibitions of his work took place in New York City at various East Village galleries from 1981 to 1983. During this period he worked in Andy Warhol's factory, primarily in the silkscreen production studio applying diamond dust to Warhol's Myths series. He moved briefly to Los Angeles and had his first solo exhibition there in 1983 at Ulrike Kantor Gallery. In Los Angeles, he would visit the Whisky a Go Go with Basquiat. Condo shared in an interview with artist Amadour, "I visited Ed Ruscha’s studio to see his work in Venice Beach and met Billy Al Bengston, and Ed Moses. Larry Gagosian was the biggest one showing New York artists to people that everybody knew. I would go over there with Basquiat, hang around, and listen to music in the middle of the gallery. He was working on his show and Toxic, and the guys from New York came out, too." After returning to New York later that year he made his first trip to Europe. Condo moved to Cologne, Germany, where he met and worked with several artists from the Mulheimer Freiheit group, including Walter Dahn and Jiri Georg Dokoupil. His first solo exhibition in Europe was in 1984 at Monika Sprüth Gallery.

While still in Europe Condo met and began working with American art dealer Barbara Gladstone, and in 1984 had a simultaneous two-gallery exhibition in New York at Pat Hearn and Barbara Gladstone Galleries. Already close friends with Basquiat by this time, Condo met Keith Haring on returning to New York, and the two remained lifelong friends until Haring's death from AIDS in 1990. Several of Condo's most significant works from this period, such as Dancing to Miles (1985), which was included in the 1987 Whitney Biennial and is now in the collection of the Broad Foundation in Los Angeles, were painted in Haring's East Village studio.

Between 1985 and 1995 Condo lived and worked mostly in hotels and rented studios between Paris and New York, while continuing to exhibit extensively in the United States and Europe. In New York, Condo and Joseph Glasco maintained studios at I Bond Street and became good friends. Condo, Glasco and Julian Schnabel were preparing for exhibitions with Leslie Waddington's gallery in London during that time. After Condo moved to Paris, Glasco stayed in his apartment in Île de la Cité one summer in the late 1980s. In Paris, Haring introduced Condo to the American writer and artist Brion Gysin, who in turn later introduced him to William S. Burroughs. Condo and Burroughs collaborated on numerous paintings and sculptures between 1988 and 1996. Selected works from their collaborations were exhibited in 1997 at Pat Hearn Gallery, New York. Condo and Burroughs also worked together on a collection of writings and etchings titled Ghost of Chance, which was published by the Whitney Museum in 1991.

While in Paris, Condo also met and befriended philosopher and semiotician Félix Guattari, best known for his collaborations with Gilles Deleuze, when Condo was working in a studio in the apartment building where Guattari resided. Guattari wrote extensively on Condo's work, including an introductory text and interview in the exhibition catalogue for Condo's 1990 solo exhibition at Galerie Daniel Templon. Of Condo's paintings Guattari wrote:

"There is then a very specific 'Condo effect' which separates you from all the painters you seem to reinterpret. You sacrifice everything to this effect, particularly pictorial structure, which you systematically destroy, thus removing a protective guardrail, a frame of reference which might reassure the viewer, who is denied access to a stable set of meanings." (Felix Guattari, 1990)

Throughout his career as an artist, Condo's work has served as an influence and inspiration to contemporary writers including Burroughs, Guattari, Demosthenes Davvetas, Donald Kuspit, Wilfried Dickhoff, and Salman Rushdie, whose 2001 novel Fury includes a chapter inspired by Condo's 1994 oil painting The Psychoanalytic Puppeteer Losing His Mind. American fiction writer David Means also used a Condo painting, The Fallen Butler (2010), as inspiration for his short story "The Butler's Lament", which appears in the catalogue for the exhibition Mental States, a mid-career survey of the artist's paintings and sculptures organized by the Hayward Gallery, London, and the New Museum, New York, in 2011. Allen Ginsberg, a close friend and frequent visitor to Condo's Paris studio, where he photographed the artist on several occasions, asked Condo to paint his portrait for the cover of his Selected Poems: 1947-1995, published in 1996 by HarperCollins.

Condo's paintings, like The Orgy (2004), Superman (2005), Batman and Bunny (2005), Maja Desnuda (2005), Dreams and Nightmares of the Queen (2006), and God (2007), place archetypal human figures in a world of humorous, grotesque painting style that the artist refers to as Psychological Cubism.

== Commissions ==
In addition to commissions for book covers, such as Jack Kerouac's Book of Sketches (Penguin Poets, 2006), for which he also wrote the introduction, Condo has also created or designed album covers for numerous musicians. Most notably, in 2010 Condo collaborated with rapper Kanye West and created a series of paintings for West's album My Beautiful Dark Twisted Fantasy and various singles. Kanye West used to use a Condo painting as his Twitter image, and Condo has painted a Hermès Birkin Bag for West that West gave to Kim Kardashian. Condo also produced four alternate copies of the album cover that, although not included on the actual cover of the record, came included with certain productions of the record on vinyl and as individual posters. All variations reflect themes found throughout the West album, and were all considered for the cover. The final design, depicting a demonic caricature of the artist with a female phoenix on his lap and bottle in his hand, was even censored by iTunes, and the album cover is now a pixelated version of the Condo painting. Condo subsequently distanced himself from Kanye West in an interview. That same year, Condo released a t-shirt with Adam Kimmel for Barneys New York. Condo's work has also been featured on the covers of the Phish album The Story of the Ghost (Elektra, 1998), Danny Elfman's Serenada Schizophrana (2006), and Franck Debussy Schumann by Dora Schwarzberg and Martha Argerich (AventiClassic, 2006), among others. Most recently, Condo painted an abstracted portrait of the opera countertenor Anthony Roth Costanzo for the cover of his first album ARC, released in 2018 by DeccaGold and featuring recordings of works by Philip Glass and George Frideric Handel. In 2020, Condo collaborated with rapper Travis Scott and created the artwork for Scott's single "Franchise".

== Exhibitions ==
In 2005 the Museum der Moderne Salzburg and Kunsthalle Bielefeld co-organized the exhibition George Condo: One Hundred Women, curated by Dr. Thomas Kellein. The exhibition was accompanied by a monograph featuring essays by Margrit Brehm, Stacey Schmidt, and Kellein. In 2009 the Musee Maillol, Paris, organized the exhibition George Condo: The Lost Civilization featuring paintings, drawings, and sculpture created between 2003 and 2008. The monograph published by Gallimard in conjunction with the exhibition featured new writings on the artist's work by Didier Ottinger, Bertrand Lorquin, and Massimiliano Gioni, as well as a reprinting of Felix Guattari's original text from 1990.

In 2011, the New Museum in New York City opened a mid-career retrospective of Condo's work titled Mental States. This watershed exhibition was critically acclaimed by Holland Cotter of The New York Times as "sensational". The show traveled to Museum Boijmans Van Beuningen in Rotterdam, the Hayward Gallery, and the Schirn Kunsthalle Frankfurt.

In 2013, Condo's large black-and-white banner featuring a court jester was installed on the façade of the Metropolitan Opera House, advertising the Met's new production of Verdi's Rigoletto. In 2016 the Berggruen Museum in Berlin honored Condo with the exhibition George Condo. Confrontation.

In 2017, the Phillips Collection in Washington, D.C. presented George Condo: The Way I Think, 1962 - 2017. The exhibition is a major survey of Condo's drawings and "drawing paintings" that traveled to the Louisiana Museum of Modern Art in Humlebæk, Denmark in autumn 2017.

In 2023 Condo was the subject of an exhibition, Entrance to the Mind: Drawings by George Condo in the Morgan Library & Museum, at the Morgan Library & Museum.

From 10 October 2025 to 8 February 2026, the Musée d’Art Moderne de Paris, exhibited a retrospective of Condo’s work.

== Collections ==
Condo's work is in the permanent collections of several New York museums, namely the Museum of Modern Art, the Whitney Museum, the Metropolitan Museum of Art, the Albright-Knox Museum, the Corcoran Gallery of Art, Washington D.C., and the Broad Foundation, Los Angeles, among other American and European museums and public collections.

== Recognition ==
In 2000, Condo was the subject of the documentary film Condo Painting, directed by John McNaughton. The film, which follows the progress of Condo's large-scale oil painting Big Red over the course of one year, features an appearance by Allen Ginsberg, as well as footage of Condo collaborating with William S. Burroughs on paintings the two made together at Burroughs' Kansas home in the mid-1990s.

There has been extensive critical writing about Condo's work. Several monographs have been published, including The Imaginary Portraits of George Condo (powerHouse), George Condo: Sculpture by Thomas Kellein (Hatje Kanz), George Condo: One Hundred Women (Hatje Kanz), and in conjunction with an exhibition of the same title, George Condo: Mental States (Hayward Publishing).

In 1999, Condo received an Academy Award from the American Academy of Arts and Letters, and in 2005 he received the Francis J. Greenburger Award. He has been invited to lecture at many prestigious institutions including Columbia University, Yale University, Pasadena Art Center, San Francisco MOMA, the Solomon R. Guggenheim Museum, New York, and the New Museum, New York. In 2004, Condo taught a six-month course at Harvard University entitled Painting Memory. In 2008, he won the International Artist Award from Anderson Ranch Arts Center in Colorado.

== Art market ==
Condo has been showing with Sprüth Magers since 1984, Simon Lee since 1998, Skarstedt since 2005, and Xavier Hufkens since 2006. In January 2020, Condo signed on exclusively with Hauser and Wirth and Sprüth Magers.

His painting Force Field (2010) set his auction record of $6.85 million at Christie's Hong Kong in July 2020.

== Personal life ==
Condo married actress Anna Achdian in 1989. They have two daughters, Eleonore and Raphaelle. They divorced in 2016.

Ahead of the 2024 United States presidential election, Condo was one of 165 leading contemporary artists who contributed pieces to Artists for Kamala, an online sale with all proceeds raised going directly to the Kamala Harris campaign.
