= Michail Pirgelis =

German sculptor (born 1976)

- Born: 1976 (age 49–50); Essen
- Education: Kunstakademie Düsseldorf
- Known for: Sculpture, Readymades
- Awards: Villa Romana prize (2007); Audi Art Award for New Positions (2010)

Michail Pirgelis (born 1976) is a German sculptor.

Pirgelis was born in Essen. He studied at the Kunstakademie Düsseldorf, with Rosemarie Trockel. Pirgelis uses pieces of decommissioned commercial aircraft with minimal intervention; they are presented as ready-mades. He lives and works in Cologne.

== Awards ==
- 2007: Villa Romana prize
- 2010: Audi Art Award for New Positions at Art Cologne

== Exhibitions ==
- 2008: Artlab21
- 2010: Sprüth Magers, Berlin
