= Usina do Gasômetro =

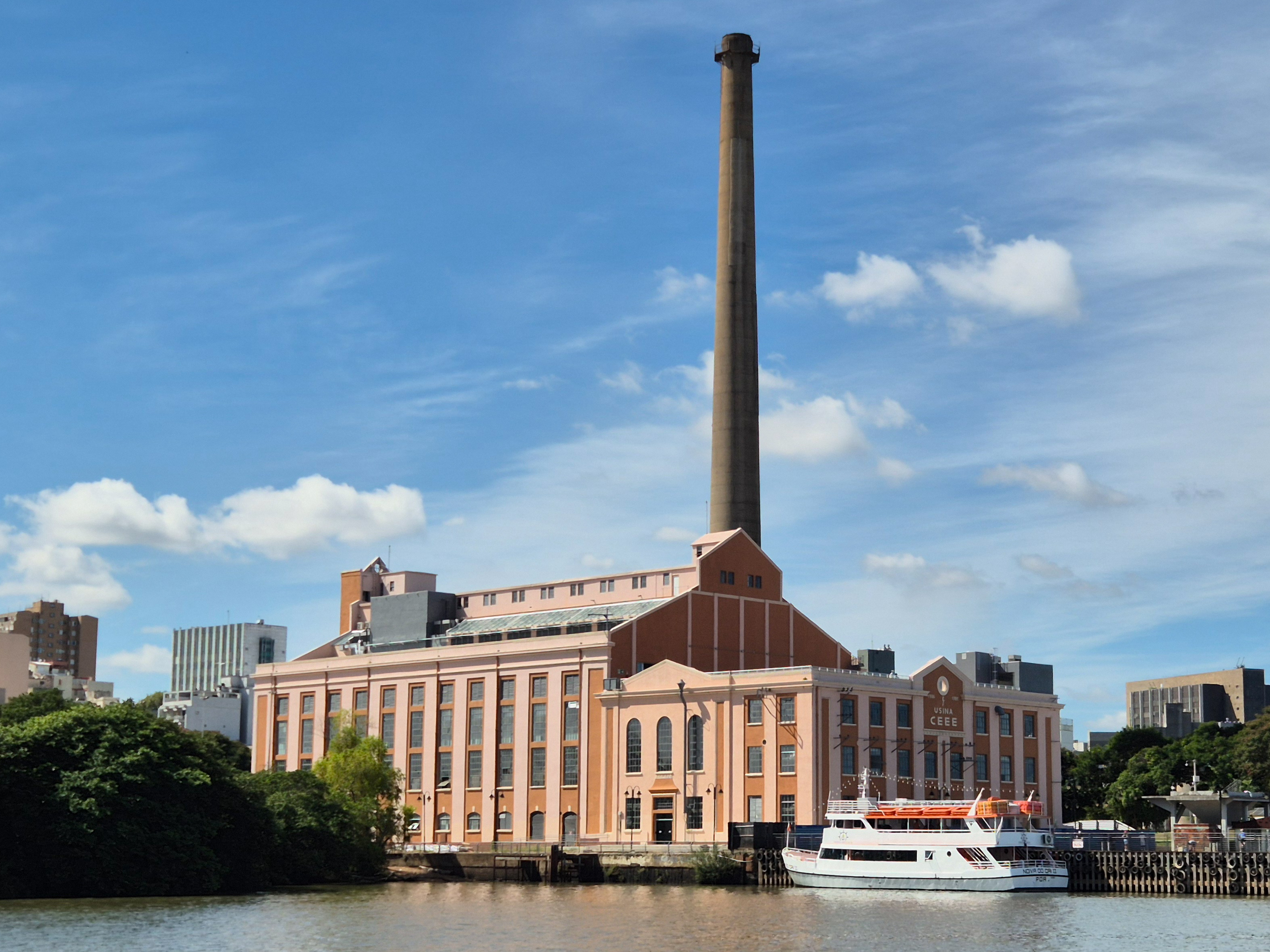
- Interactive map of the Usina do Gasômetro area

General information
- Location: Porto Alegre, Rio Grande do Sul, Brazil
- Coordinates: 30.0341°S 51.2410°W
- Opened: 1928

Usina do Gasômetro (Portuguese for Gasholder Plant) is a former electrical power station located in the Brazilian city of Porto Alegre, Rio Grande do Sul. Despite the name, it was a coal-powered plant, the name gasômetro being a reference to the plant location, in an area known as Volta do Gasômetro, which in turn had taken its name from a nearby factory: the Usina de Gás.

The thermal power station was inaugurated on November 11, 1928, to function as the headquarters of Companhia Brasil de Força Elétrica, a subsidiary of Electric, Bond & Share Co., an American company that was in charge of the electricity and electric transportation service in Porto Alegre until 1954. It functioned as a power generator until 1974, the year it was deactivated.

The municipal government's intention was to demolish it and use the area as an extension of Perimetral avenue. The building was saved from demolition after a preservation effort by civil entities. In 1982, Eletrobras transferred the use of the land to the municipality of Porto Alegre. Usina do Gasômetro was listed by the municipality in 1982 and by the state in 1983. After being restored by the municipality in 1988, the plant reopened as a cultural center in 1991.
