= Rosemarie Trockel =

German contemporary artist

- Born: 13 November 1952 (age 73); Schwerte, North Rhine-Westphalia, West Germany (now Germany)
- Notable work: Cogito Ergo Sum (1988)
- Awards: Wolf Prize in Arts (2011)

Rosemarie Trockel (born 13 November 1952) is a German conceptual artist. She has made drawings, paintings, sculptures, videos and installations, and has worked in mixed media. From 1985, she made pictures using knitting-machines. She is a professor at the Kunstakademie Düsseldorf, in Düsseldorf in Nordrhein-Westfalen.

== Early life and education ==
Trockel was born on 13 November 1952 in Schwerte, in Nordrhein-Westfalen in West Germany. Between 1974 and 1978, she studied anthropology, mathematics, sociology and theology while also studying at the Werkkunstschule of Cologne, at a time when the influence of Joseph Beuys was very strong there.

In the early 1980s, Trockel met members of the Mülheimer Freiheit artist group founded by Jiří Georg Dokoupil and Walter Dahn, and exhibited at the women-only gallery of Monika Sprüth in Cologne.

== Work ==
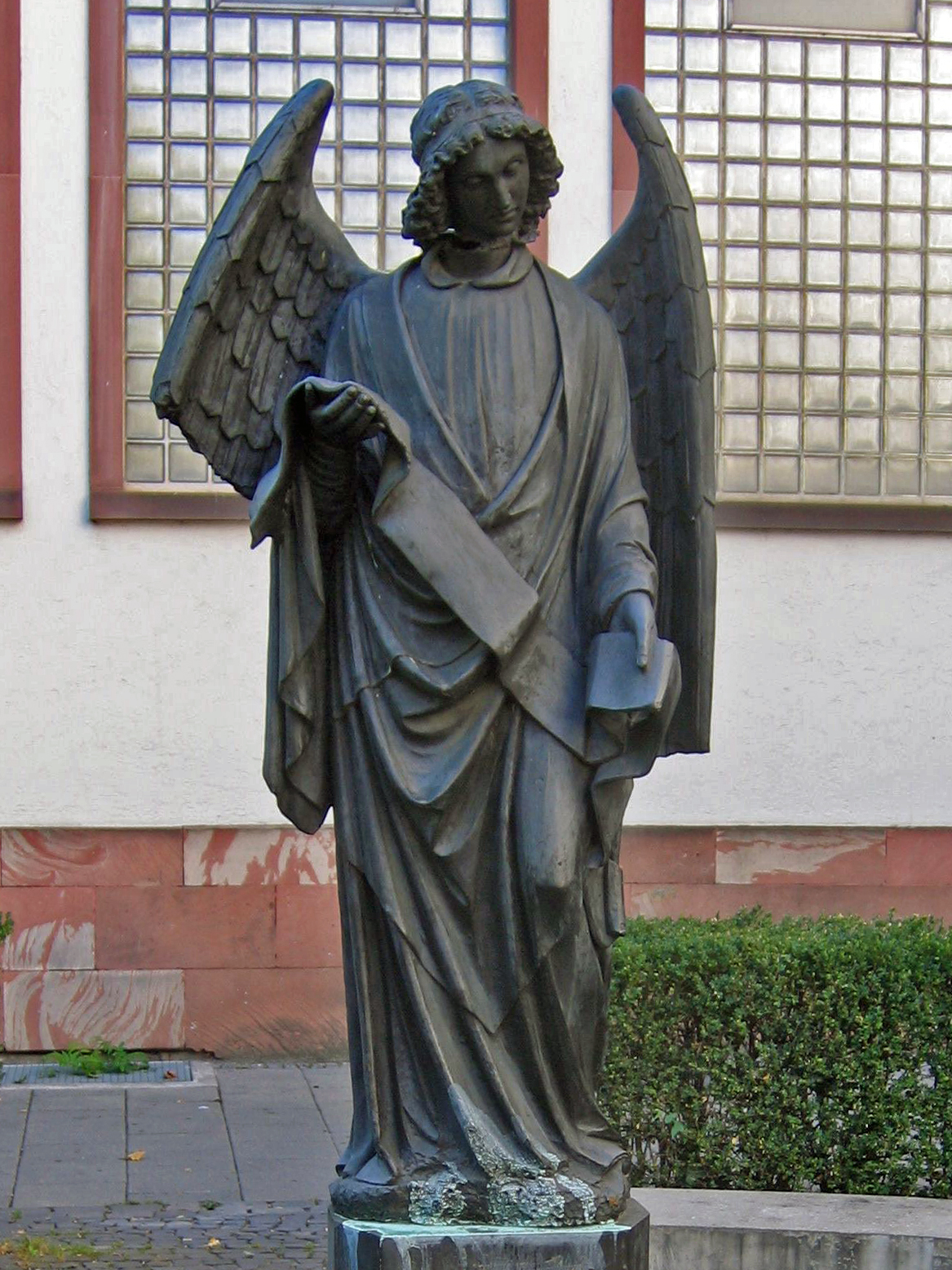
The Frankfurter Engel, in Klaus Mann Platz, Frankfurt am Main; 1994 cast iron

Trockel's work often criticises the work of other artists, or artistic styles such as minimal art. In 1985, she began to make large-scale paintings produced on industrial knitting machines. These regularly featured geometric motifs or logos such as the Playboy Bunny or a hammer and sickle, and the trademark: Made in West Germany. During the 1980s, she also worked for the magazine Eau de Cologne, which was focused on the work of women artists.

In 1994, Trockel created the Frankfurter Engel monument for the city of Frankfurt. For Documenta in 1997, she and Carsten Höller collaborated on an installation in one of the exhibition's outbuildings. Since the late 1990s, she has worked extensively with clay and has also continued to produce both hand and machine knitted "paintings". Several of these paintings were exhibited in a retrospective, Post-Menopause, at the Museum Ludwig in Cologne in 2005.

Amid the COVID-19 pandemic, Trockel collaborated with Bottega Veneta designer Daniel Lee on the brand’s 2021 ad campaign

== Recognition ==
- 2011 – Wolf Prize
- 2011 – Goslarer Kaiserring
- 2004 – Wolfgang Hahn Prize

== Exhibitions ==
Trockel’s work was included in the Italian Pavilion in 2013 and represented Germany at the Venice Biennale in 1999; she participated in Documenta in 1997 and 2012. Other exhibitions include:

- 2005: Post-Menopause, Museum Ludwig, Cologne
- 2009: Rebelle: Art & Feminism 1969–2009, Museum voor Moderne Kunst Arnhem, Arnhem, Holland
- 2012–2013: Rosemarie Trockel: A Cosmos: Museo Nacional Centro de Arte Reina Sofia, Madrid; New Museum, New York; Serpentine Gallery, London; Kunst- und Ausstellungshalle der Bundesrepublik Deutschland, Bonn
- 2015: Märzôschnee ûnd Wiebôrweh sand am Môargô niana më, Kunsthaus Bregenz, Bregenz, Austria
- 2018: The Same Different, Moderna Museet, Malmö, Sweden.
- 2025: Woven Histories: Textiles and Modern Abstraction, Museum of Modern Art, New York

== Legacy ==
Trockel's students at Kunstakademie Düsseldorf have included Thea Djordjadze, Michail Pirgelis and Bettina Pousttchi.
