= Lucy Dodd =

American painter

Lucy Dodd (born 1981, New York) is an American painter and installation artist. Dodd synthesizes pigments from various organic and inorganic matter. Her work frequently invokes art historical and mythological symbolism. Dodd has been critically compared to mid-century artists Cy Twombly, Sigmar Polke, Robert Ryman, and Willem de Kooning.

== Early life and education ==
Dodd studied at the Art Center College of Design, California (BFA, 2004) and Bard College, New York (MFA, 2011). She lives and works in Kingston, New York.

== Work ==
Dodd stages exhibitions with a dramaturgical approach, and considers her paintings "characters." This staging typically consists of a ritual entrance, furniture and other decorative arts assembled in the style of a "bohemian bazaar," and monumental canvas paintings. In a 2018 interview with artist Rashid Johnson, Dodd said: "I think about painting in a theatrical way. [...] The paintings are actually characters that people have to interact with." Dodd prefers her paintings be displayed in the round "as an object," rather than flush against a wall. Her paintings are often dispersed throughout a gallery and visible on all sides.

=== Monumental painting ===
Dodd's use of the monumental painting format refers to the gendered history of lyrical abstraction and action painting. Her debut New York solo exhibition at the project space No5A in 2013, The Studio Before 54, consisted of three large-scale paintings produced from the rubbings of various dry minerals, including graphite and iron glimmer. Listed materials also included "the souls of the shoes of Nanette Lepore, Margiela, Clergerie, a half calf cowboy boot, a no name mule, a foot with foss mud."

Throughout her work, Dodd uses both "traditional pigments and those opportunity presents her," such as SCOBYs, onion skins, avocado pits, tulips, and yew berries. These materials are sometimes site-specific; for example, a series of paintings commissioned by the Whitney Museum of American Art in 2016 for its experimental five-part exhibition, Open Plan, in which she incorporated samples of water from the nearby Hudson River. Her selections imply that a taste for aesthetics in the visual arts could be linked to other senses. Dodd understands each painting as "an organic entity" and embraces its chemical "possibility of transformation." In his review of her 2013 solo show Cake 4 Catfish at David Lewis Gallery, Jerry Saltz described Dodd's "topographic" paintings as "two-dimensional animals with inbuilt chemistries, going through secret artistic caramelizations and painterly photosynthesis, converting liquids and semisolids into bliss."

=== Symbolism ===
In her practice Dodd explores "the exhibition as a ritualized space -- in which paintings conceived as characters, mythical and poetic fragments, or totems, are activated and transformed over a period of time." Her work and its viewers are "cast" as "protagonists in a highly complex theatre of signifiers." These signifiers are drawn from elemental, art historical, and religious iconographies such as: logarithmic spirals, the bony labyrinth, the Cretan labyrinth, the Georgian dragon, Greek mythology, astrological symbols, Venus and the Divine Feminine, Pablo Picasso's Guernica, and mid-century modern furniture.

Dodd conceived of a single monumental painting the exact size of Picasso's Guernica for an exhibition at the Rubell Family Collection in 2014. The durational project, titled Guernika, culminated three years of her research on the history and mythology of Guernica and Picasso. A corresponding book, The Genesis of a Painting, was released. Its title refers to the eponymous 1962 book by Rudolf Arnheim. The Genesis of a Painting remakes Picasso's catalogue "into a visual epic where Dodd, the hero, is joined by two companions of her own creation: a starfish, a symbol of nature's innate mirroring, and the Maize Mantis, a shepherd character loosely inspired by the King of Pop, Michael Jackson."

=== Ritual and performance ===
Dodd describes her performative approach to painting is often as 'ritualistic.' She considers her paintings "absorbent" of both the visible and the "invisible" conditions of their production, for instance the particular music Dodd plays in her studio; the "smoke, sage, copal, lavender, [and] cedar" she uses to "defume" her work; and the performers she enlists to "activate" an exhibition. Rashid Johnson writes: "These unlikely and far-from-archival sources of pigmentation are akin to a shaman's brew, not only in their earthy origins but also in their activation through ritual."

Dodd has incorporated performance into her exhibitions, and has collaborated with other musical and performance artists. John Tyson describes one such collaborative performance, staged as the finale to her contribution to the Whitney Museum's Open Plan, as "equal parts Maurice Sendack's Where the Wild Things Are and Shakespeare's A Midsummer Night's Dream."

== Exhibitions ==
Dodd has been exhibited at The Power Station, Dallas; Rubell Family Collection, Miami; David Lewis, New York; Sprüth Magers, Berlin; Mendes Wood DM, São Paulo; and Blum & Poe, Los Angeles; The Rachofsky Collection, The Warehouse, Dallas; Skarstedt, New York; Altman Siegel, San Francisco; Campoli Presti, Paris; Galleria Alfonso Artiaco, Naples; Kaufmann Repetto, Milan; Armada, Milan; Meyer Kainer, Vienna; ProChoice, Vienna; Front Desk Apparatus, New York; White Columns, New York; The Kitchen, New York, and Performa 11.

== Collections ==
Dodd's work is included in the Whitney Museum of American Art, New York; Solomon R. Guggenheim Museum, New York; Walker Art Center, Minneapolis, MN; Aïshti Foundation, Beirut; Sammlung Goetz, Münich, Germany; The Rubell Family Collection, Miami, FL.
