= Thomas Scheibitz =

German painter and sculptor (born 1968)

Thomas Scheibitz (born 1968 in Radeberg, East Germany) is a German painter and sculptor. Together with Tino Sehgal he created the German pavilion on the 51st Venice Biennale in 2005. He lives and works in Berlin.

== Life and work ==
The son of an East German stonemason, Thomas Scheibitz was born in Radeberg, Germany in 1968. A student of Professor Ralf Kerbach, he studied alongside Frank Nitsche and Eberhard Havekost at the Dresden Art Academy. He started painting and producing sculpture in 1990 and quickly gained international recognition. Through the use of both mediums, he explores the boundary between figuration and abstraction, playing with the traditional genres of landscape, still life and portraiture. According to Roberta Smith, "his sculptures resemble architectural models or fragments of logos; his paintings are vaguely figurative".

== Exhibitions ==
Solo shows include the Institute of Contemporary Arts, London (1999), Berkeley Art Museum, San Francisco (2001), Museum der bildenden Künste, Leipzig (2001), the Stedelijk Museum, Amsterdam (2001), Centre d’Art Contemporain, Geneva (2004), Irish Museum of Modern Art, Dublin (2007), Camden Arts Centre, London (2008), and Musée d' Art Moderne, Luxembourg (2008).

In 2010, the Drawing Room, London, presented "A moving plan B - chapter ONE", a group exhibition of drawings selected by Scheibitz. As well as artists of his own generation - Dirk Bell, Tacita Dean, Thomas Demand, Mathew Hale, Manfred Pernice, Andreas Slominski and Peter Stauss – he also selected those of an older generation born in East Germany - Carl Friedrich Claus, Hermann Glöckner, Manfred Kuttner, A.R. Penck and Eugene Schönebeck.

== Select solo shows ==
- ONE-Time Pad, BALTIC Centre for Contemporary Art, Newcastle, GB, 2013
- ONE-Time Pad, MMK Museum für Moderne Kunst Frankfurt am Main, D, 2012
- A Panoramic View of Basic Events, Tanya Bonakdar Gallery, New York, USA, 2012
- mk/Ultra, Sprüth Magers Berlin, D, 2011
- Lineage ONE / Stilleben & Statistics, Jarla Partilager, Berlin, D, 2011
- Il fiume e le sue fonti, Collezione Maramotti, Reggio Emilia, I, 2011
- Der ungefegte Raum, Galerie im Taxispalais, Innsbruck, A, 2010
- A moving plan B – chapter TWO, Sprüth Magers, London, GB, 2010
- A moving plan B — chapter ONE, ausgewählt von / selected by Thomas Scheibitz, Drawing Room, London, GB, 2010
- A.C.G.T., Produzentengalerie Hamburg, D, 2009
- The Missing Link in Delphi, Tanya Bonakdar Gallery, New York, USA, 2009
- The Goldilocks Zone, Sprüth Magers Berlin, D, 2008
- about 90 elements / TOD IM DSCHUNGEL, Camden Arts Centre, London, GB, IMMA Irish Museum of Modern Art, Dublin, IE, 2007
- Der Tisch, der Ozean und das Beispiel, 51. Biennale Venedig, Deutscher Pavillon, I, 2005
- ABC - I II III, Centre d'Art Contemporain, Genf, CH, 2004
- Maus Appetit Dezember, Tanya Bonakdar Gallery, New York, USA, 2002
- I-geometrica B, Matrix i95 Berkeley Art Museum, San Francisco, USA, 2001
- BANNISTER DIAMOND, Stedelijk Museum, Amsterdam, NL, 2001
- Pablo Picasso x Thomas Scheibitz: Sign Scene Lexicon, Berggruen Museum, Berlin, 2019–2020

== Select group shows ==
- William S. Burroughs: Retrospective, Deichtorhallen Hamburg, Falckenberg Collection, Hamburg, D, 2013
- Don’t Be Shy, Don’t Hold Back – The Logan Collection at SMOMA, San Francisco Museum of Modern Art, San Francisco, CA, USA, 2012
- Fruits de la Passion, Centre Georges Pompidou, Paris, F, 2012
- Common Ground, 13th International Architecture Exhibition, La Biennale di Venezia, IT, 2012
- If not in this period of time — Contemporary German Painting, Museu de Arte de São Paulo, BR, 2010
- cargo, Autocenter, Berlin, D, 2009
- Constellations: Paintings from the MCA Collection, Museum of Contemporary Art, Chicago, USA, 2009
- Gipfeltreffen der Moderne — Das Kunstmuseum Winterthur, Kunst- und Ausstellungshalle der Bundesrepublik Deutschland, Bonn, D, 2009
- Revue. Gegenwartskunst aus der Sammlung, Pinakothek der Moderne, München / Munich, D, 2009
- WALL ROCKETS: Contemporary Artists and Ed Ruscha, The FLAG Art Foundation, New York, USA, 2008
- The Krautcho Club / In and out of Place, Forgotten Bar Project, Berlin, D, 2008
- Multiplex: Directions in Art, 1970 to Now, MoMA — Museum of Modern Art, New York, USA, 2007
- Sculptors Drawing, Aspen Art Museum, USA, 2007
- The Artist Dining Room, Tate Modern, Level 2 Gallery, London, GB, 2007
- Von Richter bis Scheibitz: Deutsche Arbeiten auf Papier seit 1960 aus der Sammlung, Kunstmuseum Winterthur, CH, 2006
- Construction New Berlin, Phoenix Art Museum, USA, 2006
- The Addiction, Gagosian Gallery Berlin, D, 2005
- Drawing from the Modern 1975–2005, MoMA — Museum of Modern Art, New York, USA, 2005
- An Aside, Camden Arts Centre, London, GB, 2005
- 26th Biennale São Paulo, BR, 2004
- Art contemporain, de 1960 à nos jours, Centre Pompidou, Paris, F, 2004
- Supernova, Art of the 1990s from the Logan Collection, SFMOMA — San Francisco Museum of Modern Art, USA, 2003
- Berlin-Moskau, Martin-Gropius-Bau, Berlin, D, 2003
- Pittura/Painting: Von Rauschenberg bis Murakami, Museo Correr, 50. Biennale Venedig, I, 2003
- deutschemalereizweitausenddrei, Frankfurter Kunstverein, D, 2003

== Collections ==
Scheibitz' works are included in major collections, including the Museum of Modern Art, New York; the Albright-Knox Art Gallery, Buffalo; and the National Galleries of Scotland, Edinburgh.
