= Jiří Georg Dokoupil =

Czech-German painter and graphic artist

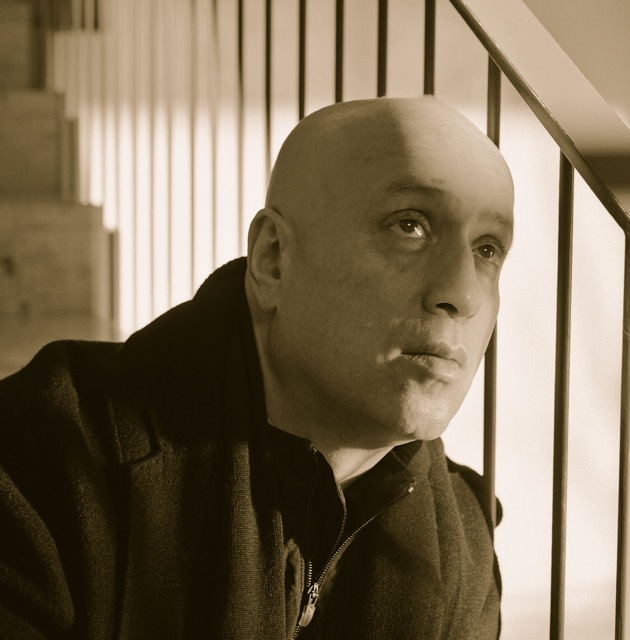
Jiri Georg Dokoupil, 2004

Jiří "Georg" Dokoupil (born 3 June 1954) is a Czech-German painter and graphic artist. He was a founding member of the German artist group Mülheimer Freiheit and the Junge Wilde Art movement, which arose in the late 1970s and early 1980s.

Dokoupil lives and works between Berlin, Rio de Janeiro, Plovdiv, Dakar and Las Palmas.

== Biography ==
Jiří Dokoupil was born in Krnov, then Czechoslovakia, in 1954. After the invasion of the Soviet army in Prague in 1968, he escaped with his family over Austria to Germany. In 1976 he began studying at the Academy of Fine Arts in Cologne. Later on, he also attended classes at the Universities of Frankfurt and the Cooper Union in New York, where he studied among others under German concept artist Hans Haacke. The influence of Haacke is evident in Dokoupil's early work. From 1983 to 1984 Dokoupil was guest professor at the Academy of Fine Arts of Düsseldorf and 1989 in Madrid.

In 1979 Dokoupil founded the group Mülheimer Freiheit with artists such as Gerhard Naschberger, Hans Peter Adamski, Gerard Kever, Peter Bömmels and Walter Dahn. The group was associated with the art dealer Paul Maenz who organised Dokoupil's first solo exhibition in 1982. In their shared studio in Cologne on a street named Mülheimer Freiheit, the six Jungen Wilden sought to explore a contemporary expression for their art by using a neoexpressive, figurative style of intensely colourful painting with traditional subjects and by overriding the intellectual, reduced formal language of Minimal and Conceptual Art. "I’d come to realize that the conceptual artists had become liars," Dokoupil has said. "What they had promised us was salvation, art without form. But I’d go into a gallery and there would be nothing to see, and it would be for a lot of money – that just couldn’t be it."

But already in an early stage, Dokoupil developed a less wild, rather unusual method of working and soon found his radical, subjective way to consider individual things. With his "book painting" shown at Documenta 7, Kassel, in 1982, Dokoupil attracted the attention of the art world. It was a gigantic material painting called God, show me your balls, a kind of homage to a Julian Schnabel plate painting, (which were made of broken ceramic dishes collaged into an image). Schnabel was not invited to participate in the exhibition – in Dokoupil's eyes a serious affront. Since then – besides the early group exhibitions with the Mülheimer Freiheit – Dokoupil's work has been seen in numerous one-man shows in galleries, museums and at other cultural sites worldwide.

== Works ==
In accordance with the thesis of Dadaist Marcel Duchamp, Dokoupil never wanted to be subordinated to a personal or a forced style. He never developed a uniform style that would allow the observer to recognize his work. Rather he paraphrases different preceding styles, plays with them and invents new techniques. Only a certain expressivity and his affinity for eroticism may define his world of images. His oeuvre today contains over 60 series and far more than 100 devised techniques or styles. A selection of his series is listed below.

- Mülheimer Freiheit (1980–1981)
- New School of Cologne (1982)
- Blue Paintings about Love (1982)
- Documenta Paintings (1982)
- Theoretical Paintings (1983)
- Terry Cloth Paintings (1983–1984)
- The Pacifier Paintings (1984)
- The Apple Maiden (1984)
- Children Paintings (1983–1985)
- Corporations & Products (1985–1986)
- Madonnas in Ecstasy (1985–1987)
- Esoteric Paintings (1987)
- Jesus Paintings (1986–1987)
- Soot Paintings (Candle and Torch) (1989-today)
- Mother's Milk Paintings (1989–1991)
- Tire Paintings (1991–1992)
- Soap Bubble Paintings (1992-today)
- The Green Paintings (1996)
- Slavic Paintings (1996–1999)
- Pigment Paintings (1998–2002)
- Whip Paintings (2002–2003)
- Buddha Paintings (2003–2004)
- The Arrugadist Paintings (1999–2005)
- Movie Paintings (2007–2009)

Since 1989 Dokoupil has developed the technique of Soot Paintings, painting projected images with soot of a burning candle or in larger works with the flame of a torch onto a blank canvas hanging flat from the ceiling. The Soot Paintings, often regarded as the most important series within Dokoupils oeuvre, contain different series such as the depictions of art auctions, the Subastas- series, of 1989 or recent ones called Leopards(2000–2009) or "Christ" paintings depicting Jesus Christ (a reference to his 1986/87 series of the Jesus paintings). For his Tire paintings of 1991–1992, he used freshly colour-dyed rolling tires on predominantly wet, ungrounded canvas. In his Soap Bubble Paintings of 1992-93 he lets soap-bubbles burst on canvas, while the liquid soap is mixed with colour or ink. In 2003 Dokoupil creates Whip Paintings by lashing a cowboy whip, which was stuck in a paint pot before, at the canvas. One of Dokoupil's most recent work is the series of spray-painted Buddhas on canvas. They are meant to be like Buddha, Marilyn and Mona Lisa all at once, since Warhol's Marilyn is the Mona Lisa of the 20th century.

Even though a retrospective of his oeuvre would resemble a group show of different painters, it has nothing to do with any pluralism of styles, with the claim of the coincidence of styles, or with a variety of post-modern irony. The focus of his multifaceted oeuvre is in fact on exploring original techniques and configurations generating a domain for playful experimentation and physical tension in which new images can arise and assuring that the act of making images is independent of the iconographic compulsions of the media world today. In that sense, Dokoupil could be seen as an "artist inventor": an inventor of styles and techniques, ultimately a clearly conceptual approach.

== Exhibitions ==
Selected Exhibitions:

- Prague Castle Riding School, Praha, 2010
- Galerie Bruno Bischofberger and Galerie Andrea Caratsch, Zürich, 2009
- Ben Brown Fine Arts, London, 2008
- Deichtorhallen, Hamburg, 2005
- National Gallery, Praha, 2005
- Haus der Kunst, Brno (Czech republic), 2005
- Centro Atlantico de Arte Moderno CAAM, Las Palmas de Gran Canaria, 2003
- Kestner Gesellschaft, Hannover, 2002
- Centraal Museum, Utrecht, 2002
- Milton Keynes Gallery, Central Milton Keynes, 2002
- Museo Nacional Centro de Arte Reina Sofía, Madrid, 2002
- Château de Chenonceau, Chenonceaux, 1999
- Museum Weimar, Weimar 1997
- Museum Moderner Kunst Stiftung Ludwig, Wien, 1997
- Centre d'Art Contemporain de Fréjus, Fréjus, 1996
- Tony Shafrazi Gallery, New York, 1994
- Sala Amárica, Diputación Foral de Alava, Vitoria-Gasteiz, 1993
- Galería Juana de Aizpuru, Madrid, 1992
- Horsens Kunstmuseum, Lund, 1991
- Kunsthalle Kiel, Kiel, 1991
- Robert Miller Gallery, New York, 1990
- Fundación Caja de Pensiones, Madrid, 1989
- Galerie Bruno Bischofberger, Zürich, 1987
- Ileana Sonnabend Gallery, New York, 1986
- Leo Castelli Gallery, New York, 1985
- Museum Folkwang, Essen, 1984
- Kunstmuseum Luzern, Luzern, 1984
- Groninger Museum, Groningen, 1984
- Espace Lyonnais d'Art Contemporain, Lyon, 1984
- Gallery Mary Boone, New York, 1983
- Galerie Paul Maenz, Köln, 1982

== Collections ==
Selected Collections:

- Van Abbemuseum, Eindhoven
- Neue Galerie – Sammlung Ludwig, Aachen
- Groninger Museum, Groningen
- Sonnabend Collection, New York
- Staatsgalerie Stuttgart
- Boymans van Beuningen, Rotterdam
- Kunsthaus Zurich
- Metzger Collection, Museum Folkwang, Essen
- Neue Galerie, Berlin
- Emanuel Hoffmann Foundation, Basel
- Museum am Ostwall, Dortmund
- Deutsche Bank, Frankfurt
- The National Museum of Contemporary Art, Seoul
- Caixa de Pensiones, Barcelona
- Centre Georges Pompidou, Paris
- Museo Nacional Centro de Arte Reina Sofía, Madrid
- Museo de Bellas Artes de Alava, Vitoria-Gasteiz
- Kunstmuseum Horsens, Denmark
- Kunstmuseum Wolfsburg
- Kunsthalle zu Kiel
- Paul Maenz Collection, Neues Museum Weimer
- Bischofberger Collection, Zurich
- Migros Museum, Zurich
- Société General Collection, Paris
- Rubell Family Collection, Miami

== Films ==
He acted in (and co-produced) a few films of Daryush Shokof, amongst them Dogs are not allowed, Breathful, and Flushers.

== See also ==
- List of German painters

== Bibliography ==
- Wilfried Dickhoff; Robert Fleck, eds. (2005). Dokoupil – Painting in the 21st Century. Hamburg: DUMONT. ISBN 3-8321-7553-9.
- Carlos Ortega, ed. (2000). dokoupil. Madrid: Museo Nacional Centro de Arte Reina Sofía. ISBN 84-8003-976-0.
- Pérez Esteban; José Antonio, eds. (2013). Cuadros de humo: una constante esencial en la obra de Jiri Georg Dokoupil. Múnich: Grin. ISBN 978-3-656-49637-3.
