= Thea Djordjadze =

German-Georgian artist

Thea Djordjadze (Georgian: თეა ჯორჯაძე; born 1971 in Tbilisi, Georgia) is a contemporary German-Georgian artist based in Berlin, Germany. She is best known for sculpture and installation art, but also works in a variety of other media (drawing, painting, printing, performance, video, music).

== Career ==
Thea Djordjadze studied at the Academy of Arts in Tbilisi from 1988–1993. Due to the Georgian Civil War the school was closed in 1993. Djordjadze left the country and became a student at the Gerrit Rietveld Academy in Amsterdam. After a year she left the Netherlands for the Staatliche Kunstakademie Düsseldorf, where Professor Dieter Krieg (until 1997) and Professor Rosemarie Trockel (1998–2001) became her teachers. In the mid 1990s she briefly returned to Georgia to complete her studies with an MFA at the State Academy of Arts. In 2000 she graduated as Meisterschüler of Rosemarie Trockel.

From 1999 until 2003, Djordjadze was a member of the artist group hobbypopMUSEUM, alongside Bettina Furler, Sophie von Hellermann, Markus Vater and others. The collective organised exhibitions, performances, gatherings, and released several catalogues, and records such as Studio Apartment. Among others, hobbypopMUSEUM participated in shows in San Francisco by Luc Tuymans, then curator of the NICC in Antwerp, and at the Tate Gallery.

On several occasions Djordjadze has made collaborative works with Rosemarie Trockel, including for the 2003 Venice Biennial, Kunsthalle St. Gallen (2006), 11th Lyon Biennial (2007), Sprüth Magers Berlin (2017), and Deichtorhallen Hamburg (2019), among others.

== Work ==
Thea Djordjadze works with a wide range of materials such as steel, plaster, wood, aluminum, ceramic, glass, fabrics, foam, cardboard, papier-mâché, and found objects. Her sculptures and installations can often be described as assemblages. Her working process is intuitive and informed by influences that reach from art to architecture, design, and literature. Her works contrast organic forms and geometric structures, as well as finished and rough surfaces. Over the years, her work has developed from smaller formats to a comprehensive installation practice that responds to the architectural peculiarities of the respective exhibition space. Another characteristic of her work is the ongoing experimentation with a formal vocabulary that is located at the intersection between sculpture and display.

References to popular culture can be detected in her works and their titles: film (e.g. Augen ohne Gesicht, 2000), architecture (e.g. le Corbusier in Mondi Possibli 2006), (popular) science and hermeticism (e.g. edition Die Mathematik, 2001, installation o.T. (Dipol), 2003, or performances WahrSagen, 2001, and Kaffeesatzlesen, 2008), literature (e.g. Je n'ai besoin de personne pour me souvenir Lilya Brik and Vladimir Mayakovsky or in Archäologie, Politik, Politik, Archäologie, Archäologie, Politik, Politik, Archäologie Andrè Malraux and Joseph Brodsky), as well as Georgian arts and crafts and culture (e.g. in incorporating carpets in her work or in quoting Niko Pirosmani in 2001).

Although an older work from 2007, Der Knacks (i.e. the crack) shows the artist's working method: a broken plaster sculpture subsequently is reassembled into an unstable formation. The title of the work refers to Francis Scott Fitzgerald’s The Crack-Up, in which a fissure or a failure is indicated as the center part of the creative process.

== Solo Exhibitions (selection) ==
- 2023: the ceiling of a courtyard, WIELS Contemporary Art Centre, Brussels
- 2022: Se souvenir et témoigner, Musée d'Art Moderne et Contemporain(MAMC), Saint-Étienne
- 2021/22: all building as making, Martin-Gropius-Bau, Berlin
- 2019: one is so public, and the other, so private., Kunstmuseum Winterthur, Winterthur
- 2019: if I were an early person, Sprüth Magers, Los Angeles
- 2018: o potio n., Portikus, Frankfurt am Main
- 2017: Thea Djordjadze. Inventur SGSM, Pinakothek der Moderne, Staatliche Graphische Sammlung, München
- 2017: Thea Djordjadze / Rosemarie Trockel. Un soir, j'assis la beauté sur mes genoux. And I found her bitter. And I hurt her, Sprüth Magers, Berlin
- 2016: To be in an upright position on the feet (studio visit), Wiener Secession, Wien
- 2016: Space Under, Projects 103, MoMA PS1, New York
- 2015: MA SA I A LY E A SE – DE, South London Gallery, London
- 2014: Thea Djordjadze, MIT List Visual Arts Center, Cambridge
- 2013: Thea Djordjadze, Aspen Art Museum, Aspen (Colorado)
- 2013: November, Kölnischer Kunstverein, Köln
- 2012: our full, Kunsthall Malmö, Malmö
- 2011: Lost Promise in a Room, The Common Guild, Glasgow
- 2011: Thea Djordjadze – His vanity requires no response, Contemporary Art Museum St. Louis
- 2010: Thea Djordjadze, Foksal, Warschau
- 2009: Thea Djordjadze. endless enclosure, Kunsthalle Basel, Basel
- 2009: Explain away - ე.ი., Galerie Monika Sprüth Philomene Magers, Berlin
- 2008: Thea Djordjadze, Kunstverein Nürnberg, Nürnberg
- 2008: Un soir, j'ai assis la beauté sur mes genoux. And I found her bitter and i hurt her, Galerie Monika Sprüth Philomene Magers, München (with Rosemarie Trockel)
- 2007: Possibility, Nansen, Studio Voltaire, London
- 2007: History of an Encounter, Galerie Micky Schubert, Berlin
- 2005: 2, Bar Ornella, Köln
- 2003: Fröhliche Wissenschaft, Brandenburgischer Kunstverein, Potsdam
- 2001: The Sight of the Conductor, (Peter-Mertes-Stipendium) Bonner Kunstverein, Bonn

== Group Exhibitions (selection) ==
- 2023: Your Home Is Where You’re Happy, Haus Mödrath - Räume für Kunst, Kerpen
- 2023: Niko Pirosmani, Fondation Beyeler, Riehen/Basel
- 2023: Ecstatic: Selections from the Hammer Contemporary Collection, Hammer Museum, Los Angeles
- 2022: Under Construction, Hamburger Bahnhof - Museum für Gegenwart, Berlin
- 2022: 22 WOMEN ARTISTS, Stations, Berlin
- 2021: Around the Day in Eighty Worlds, CAPC - Musée d'Art Contemporain, de Bordeaux
- 2021: Grandi Collezioni al Museo - Collezione Ghigi, Museo Licini, Bologna
- 2020: My Body Holds Its Shape, Tai Kwun Contemporary, Hong Kong
- 2019: Hyper! A Journey into Art and Music, Deichtorhallen, Hamburg
- 2018: I do speak Landscape, Braunsfelder Family Collection, Köln
- 2017: Jumping out of an age we found uninhabitable, (two-person show with Fausto Melotti and Thea Djordjadze), Triennale di Milano, Design Museum, Mailand
- 2017: Mentales Gelb – Sonnenhöchsstand, Städtische Galerie im Lenbachhaus, München und Kunstmuseum Bonn
- 2016: Wer nicht denken will, fliegt raus. Handlungsanweisungen nach Beuys, Kurhaus Kleve, Kleve
- 2016: NO MAN'S LAND: Women artists from the Rubell Family Collection, National Museum of Women in the Arts, Washington D.C
- 2015: All the worlds futures, Biennale di Venezia, Venedig
- 2014: The Brancusi Effect - The Archival Impulse, Kunsthalle Wien
- 2014: Post/Postminimal, Kunstmuseum St. Gallen
- 2013: Collection on Display - Sammlungspräsentation des Migros Museum für Gegenwartskunst, Migros Museum für Gegenwartskunst, Zürich
- 2012: Olinka or Where the Movement is Created, Museo Tamayo, Mexiko-Stadt
- 2012: Lieber Aby Warburg, was tun mit Bildern, Museum für Gegenwartskunst Siegen
- 2012: Documenta 13, Kassel
- 2011: Essential Art, Collezione Maramotti, Kunstverein Frankfurt am Main
- 2011: Time again, Sculpture Center, New York

== Honors and Grants ==
In 2001, Djordjadze was awarded the Reise-Stipendium (travel grant) of SK-Stiftung Düsseldorf and Peter-Mertes-Stipendium; in 2004 the NRW-Stipendium für Künstlerinnen mit Kindern (scholarship for female artists with children of the state NRW) and Atelier–Stipendium der Imhoff–Stiftung und des Kölnischen Kunstvereins (studio grant); in 2006, she was invited by Sommerakademie des Zentrum Paul Klee and in 2007 to an artist residency by Artist-run space Studio Voltaire London, in 2008 she was granted a Arbeitsstipendium (work grant) of Kunststiftung NRW and the Katalogstipendium der Alfried-Krupp-von-Bohlen-und-Halbach-Stiftung (catalog grant). In 2009, she received the Kunstpreis der Böttcherstraße in Bremen. In March 2019 Kunsthalle Portikus was awarded the Dr. Marschner Stiftung exhibition prize 2018 for Djordjadze's solo show o potio n.

=== Memberships ===
- 2026 Member of the Academy of Arts, Berlin

== See also ==
- Jorjadze, Georgian surname
