= Thomas Demand =

German sculptor and photographer

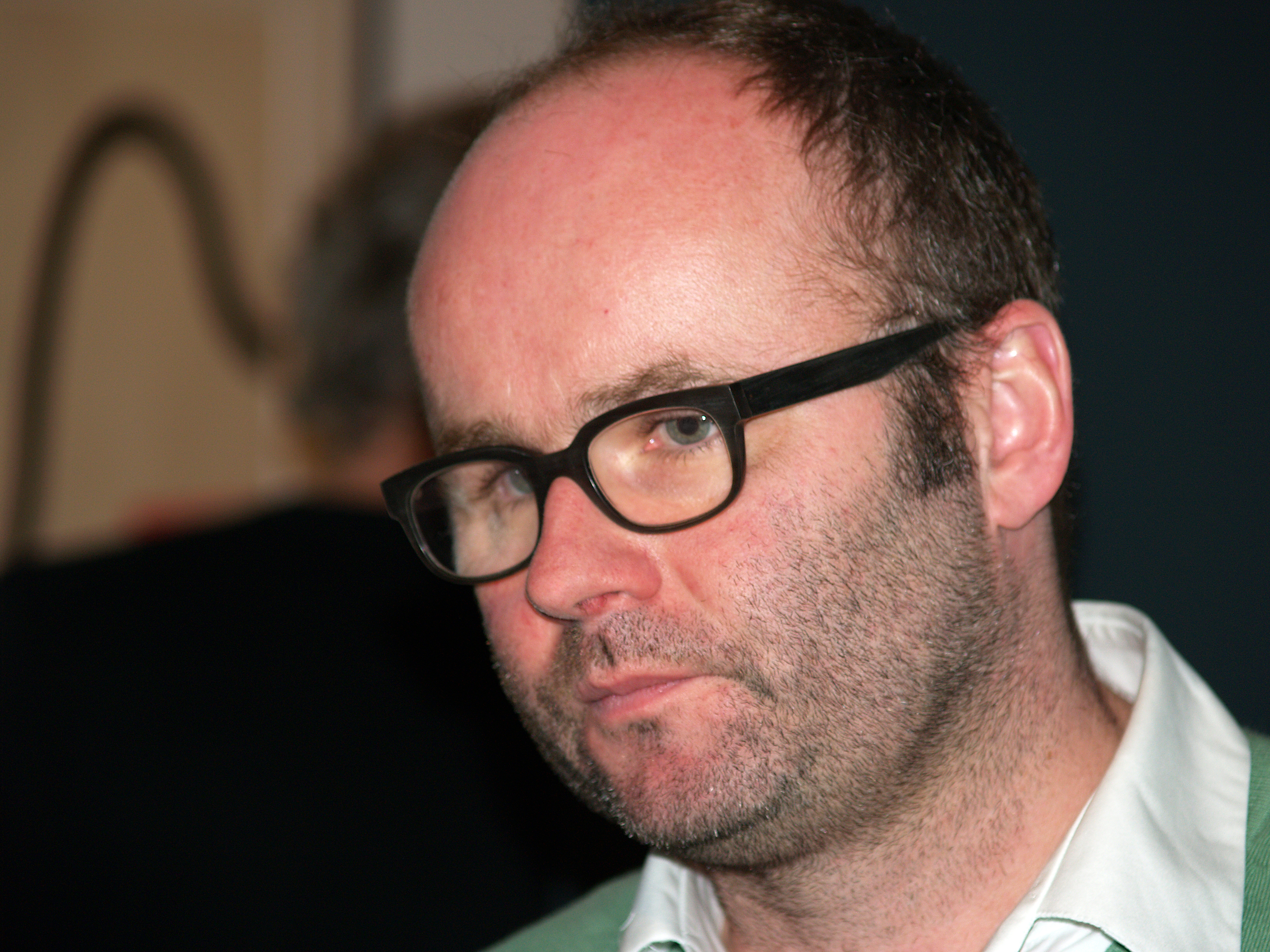
- Born: Thomas Cyrill Demand; 1964 (age 61–62)
- Education: Akademie der Bildenden Künste, Munich; Kunstakademie Düsseldorf; Cité des Arts, Paris; Goldsmiths College
- Occupation: Photographer
- Organizations: Hochschule für bildende Künste Hamburg
- Website: thomasdemand.de

Thomas Cyrill Demand (born 1964) is a German sculptor and photographer. He currently lives and works in Berlin and Los Angeles, and teaches at the University of Fine Arts, Hamburg. He makes photographs of three-dimensional models that look like real images of rooms and other spaces, often sites loaded with social and political meanings. Demand thus describes himself not as a photographer, but as a conceptual artist for whom photography is an intrinsic part of his creative process.

Demand had his first solo exhibition at Tanit Galerie in Munich in 1992. In 2004 the Kunsthaus Bregenz mounted the first comprehensive presentation of Demand's major works from 1994 until 2004. Demand's work later was the subject of mid-career retrospectives at the Museum of Modern Art, New York in 2005 and at the Neue Nationalgalerie in 2009. Other solo exhibitions include Serpentine Gallery (2006), London, the Irish Museum of Modern Art, Dublin, the Fondazione Prada, Venice (both 2007), and the Fondation Cartier pour l'Art Contemporain, Paris (2001).

== Education ==
- 1987–1989 Akademie der Bildenden Künste, Munich
- 1989–1992 Kunstakademie Düsseldorf
- 1992 Cité des Arts, Paris
- 1993–1994 Goldsmiths College, London, M.A.

== Work ==
Demand makes photographs of three-dimensional models that look like real images of rooms and other spaces, often sites loaded with social and political meanings. He thus describes himself not as a photographer, but as a conceptual artist for whom photography is an intrinsic part of his creative process. Having studied sculpture under Fritz Schwegler at the Kunstakademie Düsseldorf alongside Katharina Fritsch and Thomas Schütte, Demand began his career as a sculptor. In 1993, he began to use photography to record his elaborate, life-sized paper-and-cardboard constructions of actually or formerly existing environments and interior spaces, and soon started to create constructions for the sole purpose of photographing them. The photograph he takes of this model with a large-format-camera is the final stage of his work, and it is only this image, most often executed in an edition of six, that is exhibited unframed behind Plexiglas, not the models. On the contrary, Demand destroys his “life-size environments” after he has photographed them. One notable exception is his large scale model for Grotto (2006), inspired by a postcard of a Mallorcan grotto Demand has never visited, which was later exhibited. The life sized models are highly detailed, yet they retain subtle but deliberate flaws and anachronisms, such as an unnaturally uniform texture; according to art critic Michael Kimmelman, "the reconstructions were meant to be close to, but never perfectly, realistic so that the gap between truth and fiction would always subtly show".

In The Dailies (2012), Demand for the first time experimented with the long-outmoded process of dye transfer, which involves fixing dyes with gelatine to ordinary paper. The practice was chosen by the artist for the saturated, but not garish colours, the spatial depth, the intense darkness, the durability and the extent to which the three primary colours can be modified, unlike ordinary prints.

While the works' titles – Studio (1997), Zimmer (Room) (1996), Treppenhaus (Staircase) (1995) – are studiously devoid of superfluous information, the subjects represented in Demand's photographs often relate to pre-existing press images showing scenes of cultural or political relevance. The New York hotel room in which L. Ron Hubbard worked on Dianetics, for example, was the starting point for Zimmer (Room) (1996). Zeichensaal (Drafting Room) (1996) is inspired by a photograph of the studio of Richard Vorhölzer, the architect who was in charge of much urban planning for postwar Germany; Scheune (Barn) (1997) is based on a Hans Namuth photograph of Jackson Pollock and Lee Krasner in Pollock's East Hampton studio; Studio (1997) derives from a photograph of the 1970s television set for the German "What's My Line?". Later in his career Demand turned his interest towards the political world: Podium (2000) represents the location where Serbian dictator Slobodan Milošević gave his Gazimestan speech on the occasion of the 600th anniversary of the Serbian defeat by the Turks; in Attempt (2005), Demand has reconstructed the studio of an artist whom Baader-Meinhof terrorists targeted in the 1970s in order to blow up the Karlsruhe house of the state's prosecutor next door; Kitchen (2004) is based on soldiers' snapshots of the compound near Tikrit where Saddam Hussein was captured. Demand's series Yellowcake (2007) portrays the Nigerian Embassy in Rome, the site of a burglary in January 2001 that was used to prove Hussein's attempt to purchase uranium. More recently, the photograph Kontrollraum (Control Room) (2011), for instance, purports to show the interior of the Fukushima Daiichi Nuclear Power Plant during its tsunami-induced meltdown.

Commissioned by The New York Times, Demand's “Presidency” series depicting the Oval Office appeared on the cover and inside The New York Times Magazine, November 9, 2008 issue following the election of President Barack Obama. The five large prints, simply titled Presidency I-V, were created in the last weeks of the Bush presidency and later, with the support of Ronald Lauder and other donors, given to the National Gallery of Art, Washington, in 2009. In 2011, Demand created Metzler-Saal (2011), his largest site-specific work to date. Commissioned by the Städel Museum, the photographic work appears as if the museum's main hall is lined floor to ceiling with deep purple curtains. Demand was inspired by the drapery depicted in many of the Städel's Old Master paintings.

A result of a residency at the Getty Research Institute in Los Angeles where he discovered the archive of architect John Lautner, Model Studies (2011) is the first time that Demand photographed architectural models that were not his own. The series comprises a total of 32 close-ups of cardboard, tar paper, and foam core panels, depicting the study models from many angles.

Because Demand is working from models, the absence of people in his photographs is "conspicuous and thematic". The closest Demand has ever come to depicting people are the cut-out silhouettes of politicians and heads of state depicted in the picture frames arranged on Sir Edward Heath’s grand piano (Flügel/Grand Piano, 1993). Furthermore, every trace of language has completely vanished: the papers strewn across the work table and floor in Büro (Office) (1995) have no text on them; the labels next to the doorbells that are the subject of Hinterhaus (2005) are variously colored but bear no names.

Demand cites Gerhard Richter and Ed Ruscha as sources of inspiration.

=== Films ===
Demand has also experimented with film in works such as Tunnel (1999), a tracking shot from a driver’s perspective through an empty tunnel lined by concrete pillars; the tunnel is modelled on the Paris underpass where Princess Diana died. Recorder (2002) is a 35 mm-film loop in which a paper model of an eight-track reel-to-reel recording device appears to play the Beach Boys album Smile (1966), a recording that was until recently lost; the sound of a piano playing a variation on ‘Bicycle Rider’, an instrumental from the Smile sessions, can be heard on the soundtrack. Rolltreppe (Escalator) (2000) is an animation of 24 still images shown in a continual loop. Showing an escalator without people, taken from surveillance footage, Demand here is referencing an escalator near Charing Cross Bridge in London where a gang was caught on surveillance camera shortly after they had robbed two men and thrown them into the Thames, killing one of them. Trick (2004) refers back to the beginnings of cinema and is based on one of the first films of the Lumière brothers, Assiettes tournantes (Turning Plates) of 1896. The one-minute film re-creates a sequence in which a performer executes a stunt by spinning a set of bowls and plates on a tabletop. Camera (2007) presents a surveillance camera as it pans a public space, complete with ambient sound. In Rain (2008), Demand painstakingly re-created the effect of raindrops falling onto a hard surface, using cellophane candy wrappers and a sound track of eggs frying.

Filmed over fifteen months with the help of a 12-person team of animators, the 100-second animated film Pacific Sun (2012) is based on a video of cruise ship Pacific Sun caught in a storm between the Republic of Vanuatu and Auckland, New Zealand which the artist found on YouTube, and follows the full narrative arc of the ship's violent encounter in the Tasman Sea. The film was made on a full scale set and, like Demand's models for his photographs, was completely constructed of paper and then destroyed. It comprises a total of 2,400 frames, filmed one at a time, as animators meticulously retraced the movements of each item in the ship's dining room, shifting the paper models of plates, lemons, pendant lamps, chairs, an upright piano, and a refrigerator by several millimeters at a time. The question of why this particular event (which resulted in injuries but no deaths) merits such meticulous attention is left unanswered.

=== Curator ===
In 2010, the Nouveau Musée National de Monaco entrusted Demand with a role of guest curator for “La Carte d’Après Nature”, the opening exhibition of Villa Paloma, Monte Carlo. A modified version of this exhibition, which used Surrealist painter René Magritte as its theme and included films, photography, soundworks and architectural models from the 19th century to the present, later travelled to Matthew Marks Gallery in New York. From October 2010 to June 2011, he was a Getty Scholar.

In 2011, Demand curated a selection of postcards of grottoes from the collection of Gerhard Stein—a computer engineer from south Germany who has amassed over 50,000 postcards of grottoes over his 30 years of collecting—for the Nottingham Contemporary, filling each cabinet with multiple images of subterranean spaces. On the occasion of the 2015 opening of the Fondazione Prada in Milan, Demand set documentary materials including postcards, books, tour guides, catalogue illustrations, various advertisements and the grey cardboard reconstruction of a Spanish grotto alongside the photograph of Grotto (2006).

=== Collaborations ===
One of his long-term collaborators is British architectural firm Caruso St John, which most notably designed his 2004 exhibition at the Kunsthaus Bregenz in Austria, and has also contributed to the design of the Nationalgalerie show. Demand and Caruso St John won a competition in 2008, launched by the city of Zurich, to redesign the Escher Wyss Platz; however, the project was rejected in a public referendum in 2010.

Caruso St. John also worked on Demand's 2009 exhibition at Berlin's Mies van der Rohe designed Neue Nationalgalerie, where an installation has been purpose-built specifically for the show. The Berlin-based culture magazine 032c dedicated its 18th issue to Demand in honor of this mid-career exhibition. The publication featured both interviews by and with Demand, including a conversation between the artist and film director Todd Solondz. Demand has also been a frequent contributor and feature in the magazine, for instance in the form of a 2008 interview with fellow artist Collier Schorr.

Demand's Berlin studio occupies part of a warehouse alongside the Hamburger Bahnhof. He used to share this workspace with Tacita Dean and Olafur Eliasson.

== Awards ==
- 2011: Nominated for the Deutsche Börse Photography Prize
- 2012: Honorary doctorate degree from the Royal College of Art, London

== Exhibitions ==
=== Solo exhibitions ===
1997

- Centre d'art contemporain, Vassiviere-en-Limousin

1998

- Kunsthalle Zürich
- Kunsthalle, Bielefeld
- Kunstverein, Fribourg

1999

- "Tunnel", Art Now 16, Tate Gallery, London

2000–2001

- Fondation Cartier pour l'art contemporain, Paris

2001

- "Thomas Demand con Caruso St. John architetti", Galleria d'arte moderna (Firenze), Florence
- ArtPace, San Antonio, Texas. Traveled to Aspen Art Museum, and SITE Santa Fe
- Report, Sprengel Museum, Hanover

2002

- Lenbachhaus, Munich
- Castle of Rivoli, Turin
- SITE Santa Fe, Santa Fe, New Mexico

2003

- Louisiana Museum of Modern Art, Humlebaek, Denmark

2004

- Phototrophy, Kunsthaus Bregenz, Austria – the first comprehensive presentation of Demand's major works from 1994 to 2004.
- São Paulo Biennale

2005

- Museum of Modern Art, New York

2006

- Serpentine Gallery, London

2007

- Irish Museum of Modern Art, Dublin, Ireland

2009

- Nationalgalerie, Neue Nationalgalerie, Berlin. Traveled to Museum Boijmans Van Beuningen, Rotterdam
- Presidency Embassy, Museum moderner Kunst Stiftung Ludwig Wien, Vienna
- The Dailies, Usina do Gasômetro, Porto Alegre, Brazil

2010

- Des Moines Art Center

2012

- Animations, Des Moines Art Center. Traveled to DHC Art Center, Montreal
- Museum of Contemporary Art, Tokyo. Traveled to National Gallery of Victoria, Melbourne
- Kunst Gespräch, Schauwerk Sindelfingen, Germany

2013

- High Line Billboard, High Line Park, New York

2014

- Pacific Sun, Los Angeles County Museum of Art

==== 2025 ====
- The Stutter of History, Taipei Fine Arts Museum

=== Group exhibitions ===
Demand represented Germany at the Bienal de São Paulo in 2004. He participated in the Gwangju Biennale (2008), Shanghai Biennale (2006), in the Venice Biennale (2003), the Sydney Biennale (1998), and the Carnegie International (1999/2000). His work has been included in New Photography at the Museum of Modern Art in New York (1996), Elsewhere at the Carnegie Museum of Art in Pittsburgh (1997), Great Illusions: Thomas Demand, Andreas Gursky, Ed Ruscha at Museum of Contemporary Art, North Miami, (1999), Moving Pictures at the Solomon R. Guggenheim Museum and Guggenheim Museum Bilbao (2002 and 2003), and The Constructed Image at the Museum of Contemporary Canadian Art in Toronto (2007). Moreover, the video Pacific Sun formed part of the 2012 Toronto International Film Festival.

== Collections ==
Demand's work is held in the following public collections:

- Museum of Modern Art, New York
- Guggenheim Museum, New York
- National Gallery of Canada, Ottawa
- Tate Collection, London

== Publications ==
- Demand. Thomas. Thomas Demand. New York: Thames & Hudson, 2000. ISBN 0-500-97495-0
- Sobel, Dean; Lars Lerup; and Thomas Demand. Thomas Demand catalogue and exhibition: 2001/2002. Aspen: Aspen Art Museum; Amsterdam: De Appel, 2001. ISBN 0-934324-30-1
- Demand, Thomas; Helmut Friedel; Poul Erik Tøjner; and Susanne Gaensheimer. Thomas Demand: Lenbachhaus München: Louisiana Museum of Modern Art, Humblebaek. München: Schirmer/Mosel, 2002. ISBN 3-8296-0083-6
- Demand, Thomas; and Marcella Beccaria. Thomas Demand. Milano: Skira, 2002. ISBN 88-8491-431-0
- Demand, Thomas. Thomas Demand: Beitrag der Bundesrepublik Deutschland zur 26a Bienal de São Paulo 2004 = German contribution for the 26a bienal of Sao Paulo 2004 = Contribuicão da Republica Federal da Alemanha para a 26a bienal de São Paulo 2004. Köln: König, 2004. ISBN 3-88375-876-0
- Demand, Thomas; Eckhard Schneider; Ralph Rugoff; and Julia Franck. Thomas Demand: phototrophy. München: Schirmer/Mosel, 2004. ISBN 3-8296-0171-9
- Marcoci, Roxana; Thomas Demand; and Jeffrey Eugenides. Thomas Demand. New York: Museum of Modern Art, 2005. ISBN 0-87070-080-4
- Demand, Thomas; Beatriz Colomina; and Alexander Kluge. Thomas Demand. London: Serpentine Gallery; München: Schirmer/Mosel, 2006. ISBN 3-8296-0249-9
- Demand, Thomas; Dietmar Dath; Christian Demand; Joachim Valentin; and Andreas Bee. Thomas Demand: Klause. Köln: König, 2006. ISBN 3-86560-082-4
- Demand, Thomas; Dave Eggers; Enrique Juncosa; and Karen Sweeney. Thomas Demand: l'ésprit d'escalier. Dublin: Irish Museum of Modern Art; Köln: König; New York: D.A.P./Distributed Art Publishers, 2007. ISBN 978-3-86560-210-7
- Demand, Thomas; and Hans-Ulrich Obrist. Thomas Demand. Köln: König; New York: D.A.P./Distributed Art Publishers, 2007. ISBN 978-3-86560-204-6
- Demand, Thomas; Botho Strauss; and Udo Kittelmann. Nationalgalerie. Göttingen: Steidl Mack, 2009. ISBN 978-3-86521-941-1
- Demand, Thomas. Thomas Demand/Black Label. Kitakyushu: Center for Contemporary Art, CA Kitakyushu, 2009.
- Demand, Thomas; and Hans-Ulrich Obrist. Thomas Demand und die Nationalgalerie: Gespräch über die Ausstellung mit Hans Ulrich Obrist, Berlin 2009 = A conversation about the exhibition with Hans Ulrich Obrist, Berlin 2009. Köln: König, 2009. ISBN 978-3-86560-673-0
- Demand, Thomas; Tacita Dean; Rodney Graham; Luigi Ghirri; and Christy Lange. La Carte d'après Nature. London: Mack, 2010. ISBN 978-1-907946-00-4
- Demand, Thomas. Thomas Demand: Model Studies. Madrid/London: Ivory Press, 2011.
- Demand, Thomas. Thomas Demand. Tokyo: Kodansha, 2012.
- Demand, Thomas. Thomas Demand: The Dailies. London: Mack, 2012.
- The Complete Papers. London: Mack, 2018. All of Demand's work over the past 28 years, with texts.

== Films about Demand ==
- Memories on demand - the imagery of Thomas Demand / Das Spiel mit der Erinnerung-Die Bilderwelt des Thomas Demand. Documentarie, Germany, 2011, 26 Min., first Broadcast on arte: 12. June 2011, Author & Director: Jeremy JP Fekete, Production:rb/arte, summary from arte, nominated for the 21. Deutschen Kamerapreis 2011, Categorie: Documentaries "cut", summary from Deutscher Kamerapreis
