= Kaari Upson =

American visual artist (1970–2021)

- Born: April 22, 1970; San Bernardino, California, U.S.
- Died: August 18, 2021 (aged 51); New York City, New York, U.S.
- Education: New York Studio School
- Alma mater: California Institute of the Arts
- Occupation: Artist
- Spouse: Kirk Rudell (m. 2000; div. 2010)
- Children: 1

Kaari Upson (April 22, 1970 – August 18, 2021) was an American artist. The bulk of Upson’s career was devoted to a single series titled The Larry Project – paintings, installations, performances, and films inspired by a collection of one man's personal items she found in 2003. The Larry Project was exhibited at the Hammer Museum in Los Angeles in 2008, as part of their program Hammer Projects. Her work resides in the public collections of the Whitney Museum of American Art, the Museum of Contemporary Art, Los Angeles, and the Institute of Contemporary Art, Boston and is known for exploring themes of psychoanalysis, obsession, memory, and the body. She had lived and worked in Los Angeles.

== Biography ==
Upson was born in San Bernardino, California, on April 22, 1970. However her date of birth is often listed as 1972, incorrectly. She attended New York Studio School of Drawing, Painting and Sculpture and later attended California Institute of the Arts (CalArts). She received her BFA in 2004 and her MFA in 2007 from CalArts. She began The Larry Project as a student, and exhibited a portion of the work as her MFA thesis.

She was married from 2000 until 2010 to television producer Kirk Rudell, together they had one child.

In 2017, she had a large moment in her career when she had two New York City shows; at the Whitney Biennial and at the New Museum. That same year 2017, she was part of the Istanbul Biennial.

After fighting breast cancer for years, Upson died of metastatic breast cancer at New York City's Memorial Sloan Kettering Cancer Center in the evening of August 18, 2021.

== The Larry Project (2007–2011) ==
In 2003, after trespassing onto an abandoned property across the street from her parents' home in San Bernardino, Upson discovered boxes of ephemera: letters, legal documents, diaries, photographs, all belonging to one man who she later dubbed 'Larry.' She kept the boxes for a year, unsure of what to do with them, but, in 2004, the house mysteriously burnt down, and she decided to begin tracing the life of 'Larry' through her artwork.

For the next seven years, she produced an ongoing body of work, The Larry Project, creating a narrative through the faulty memory of the documents and her own fantasies. The work exists in a variety of mediums: drawing, sculpture, video, and performance. She discovered that 'Larry' styled himself after Hugh Hefner and partied at the Playboy Mansion; he also was involved in a few different self-help programs, including Jungian analysis, chakra cleansing, Gestalt Therapy, and Erhard Seminars Training. His hyper-masculine "Ladies' Man" persona became a site of exploration for Upson's own performances of gender, power, and desire.

In 2008, Upson made a life-size doll version of 'Larry,' that she enacted different scenes with, switching roles as his daughter, mother, and sexual partner. In 2008, Upson also made "The Grotto," a fiberglass replica of the infamous cave-like swimming pool at the Playboy Mansion. Inside the sculpture, Upson projected videos of herself, wearing silicon prostheses of breasts and genitalia, straddling the 'Larry' doll. In 2009, Upson cast the 'Larry' doll into charcoal, and used the form to make drawings against the gallery wall, slowly destroying the charcoal form in the process. In 2011, Upson cast architectural copies of 'Larry's' former house into soft pink latex, as well as other objects, like a chandelier and an iron gate. In "Mirrored Staircase Inversion (San Bernardino)" (2011), Upson went back to the site of the original house, which was now an empty dirt lot. There, she dug into the ground an inverted replica of the twin staircases that had led into 'Larry's' bedroom, and cast the giant hole in latex, creating a skin of the non-existent house. Themes of twinning, mirror images, and negative copies emerge throughout the project, as Upson drew on the pervasive fantasy of the twin Playboy Bunnies and the discovery of her own reflection in a complete stranger.

== Exhibitions ==
A select list of exhibitions by Upson:

=== Solo exhibitions ===
- 2007: Hammer Projects, Hammer Museum, Los Angeles, California
- 2009: I am bound to have some anxiety about this so please if I say stop, don't stop, Maccarone, New York City, New York
- 2011: Kaari Upson, Overduin and Kite, Los Angeles, California
- 2011: Statements, Art 42, Basel, Switzerland
- 2012: Baby, Please Come home, Massimo De Carlo, London, Italy
- 2013: Sleep with the Key, Massimo De Carlo, Milan, Italy
- 2014: Kaari Upson, Ramiken Crucible, New York, New York
- 2014: Hole, Massimo De Carlo, London, England, United Kingdom
- 2017: Good Thing You Are Not Alone, New Museum, New York City, New York
- 2019: Go Back the Way You Came, Kunsthalle Basel, Basel, Switzerland
- 2019: Door, Open, Shut, Hannoveraner Kunstverein, Hannover, Germany
- 2025: Dollhouse - A Retrospective, Louisiana, Humlebaek, Denmark

=== Group exhibitions ===
- 2009
  - Nine Lives, Hammer Museum, Los Angeles, California
  - Chinese Box, Overduin and Kite, Los Angeles, California
  - Berlin-Los Angeles: A Tale of Two (Other) Cities, Massimo de Carlo, Milan, Italy
- 2010
  - How Soon Now, Rubell Family Collection, Miami, Florida
  - One on One, SITE Santa Fe, Santa Fe, New Mexico
- 2011
  - OH!, Galerie Patrick Sequin, Paris, France
  - American Exuberance, Rubell Family Collection, Miami, Florida
  - George Herms: Xenophilia (Love of the Unknown), MOCA Pacific Design Center, Los Angeles, California
- 2012: The Residue of Memory, Aspen Art Museum, Aspen, Colorado
- 2013
  - Transforming the Known: Works from the Bert Kreuk Collection, Gemeentemuseum den Haag, The Hague, Netherlands
  - Test Platter, Whitney Museum of American Art, New York City, New York
  - CULM, Night Gallery, Los Angeles, California
  - A Selection of Resent Acquisitions, Los Angeles Museum of Contemporary Art, Los Angeles, California
- 2014
  - The Los Angeles Project, Ullens Center for Contemporary Art, Beijing, China
  - Golden State, MOCA Tucson, Tucson, Arizona
  - Maximalism, Contemporary Fine Arts, Berlin, Germany
  - Procession, CAPC Musèe D'Art Contemporain, Bordeaux, France
- 2015
  - New Skin, Aïshti Foundation, Beirut, Lebanon
  - Panoramas, The High Line, New York City, New York
  - Second Chances, Aspen Art Museum, Aspen, Colorado
  - Sleepless: The Bed in History and Contemporary Art, 21er Haus, Vienna, Austria
  - Revolution In the Making: Abstract Sculpture by Women 1947-2016, Hauser Wirth & Schimmel, Los Angeles, California
