= Hosfelt Gallery =

Coordinates: 37.7803°N 122.4046°W

Hosfelt Gallery in San Francisco, California was founded in 1996 by Todd Hosfelt to exhibit contemporary international artists working in all media.

== History ==
Hosfelt Gallery was founded by Todd Hosfelt in 1996, at 95 Federal Street in San Francisco, adjacent to the visual arts residency program Capp Street Project. In 1999 the gallery moved to a 5,000-square-foot (460 m^{2}) space in San Francisco's South of Market neighborhood on 430 Clementina Street. Designed in 1999 by Fougeron Architecture and Endres Ware Engineers, the architect was awarded for her work on the space.

In 2006, the gallery opened an additional venue, a 7,500-square-foot (700 m^{2}) space at 531 West 36th Street, in Manhattan. In 2012 the gallery expanded to a new 8,900-square-foot (830 m^{2}) San Francisco space at 260 Utah Street.

Hosfelt Gallery was among the first to exhibit such critically acclaimed artists as Shahzia Sikander, Stefan Kürten, Shirin Neshat, Marco Maggi and Jim Campbell.

In 2011, the gallery exhibited work by the late Beat artist Jay DeFeo which was the first exhibition of her work on the West Coast in fifteen years.

== Artists represented ==
Hosfelt Gallery represents emerging to established local and international contemporary artists, including: Jim Campbell, Russell Crotty, Nicole Phungrasamee Fein, Isabella Kirkland, Stefan Kürten, Michael Light, Marco Maggi, John O'Reilly, Liliana Porter, Alan Rath and William T. Wiley.

Since its inception, a focus of Hosfelt's program has been emerging artists. These include Chris Ballantyne, Rina Banerjee, Julie Chang, Reed Danziger, Anoka Faruqee, Jutta Haeckel, Emil Lukas, Driss Ouadahi, Lordy Rodriguez, Gideon Rubin and Andrew Schoultz.
