= Jens Hoffmann =

Costa Rican writer and educator (born 1974)

- Born: Jens Hoffmann-Mesén; 1974 (age 51–52); San José, Costa Rica
- Education: Ernst Busch Academy of Dramatic Arts, Amsterdam University of the Arts
- Known for: Exhibition making, writing and publishing
- Website: https://jenshoffmann.org/

Jens Hoffmann Mesén (born 1974 in San José, Costa Rica) is a writer, editor, educator, and exhibition maker. His work has attempted to expand the definition and context of exhibition making. From 2003 to 2007 Hoffmann was director of exhibitions at the Institute of Contemporary Arts London. He is the former director of the CCA Wattis Institute for Contemporary Art from 2007 to 2016 and deputy director for exhibitions and programs at The Jewish Museum from 2012 to 2017; he was terminated from the position following an investigation into sexual harassment allegations raised by staff members. Hoffmann has held several teaching positions including California College of the Arts, the Nuova Accademia di Belle Arti and Goldsmiths, University of London, as well as others.

== Education and early theater work ==
Hoffmann trained as a theater director, studied stage directing and dramaturgy at the Ernst Busch Academy of Dramatic Arts in Berlin. He holds an M.A. from DasArts: School for Advanced Research in Theater and Dance Studies at the Amsterdam University of the Arts. His early work was interested in postdramatic theatre, not based on dramatic text.

From 1993 to 1995 Hoffmann worked as an assistant dramaturg under Tom Stromberg at Theater am Turm (TAT) in Frankfurt, where he worked on productions of such directors as Rene Pollesch, Stefan Pucher, Reza Abdoh, Needcompany, Michael Laub, Jan Fabre, Baktruppen, Gob Squad, and Heiner Goebbels. With Stromberg Hoffmann organized Theater Outlines, the performing-arts program of Documenta X in Kassel (1997).

== Career ==
Hoffmann started his museum career as an intern at the Portikus Kunsthalle Frankfurt in 1995, followed by two years at the Dia Art Foundation in New York from 1995 until 1997. He worked at the Solomon R. Guggenheim Museum as an assistant curator from 1998 until 2000. From 2001 to 2002 Hoffmann worked as a curator at the Museum Kunst Palast, Düsseldorf. From 2003 to 2007 Hoffmann was the director of exhibitions at the Institute of Contemporary Arts in London, and from 2007 to 2012 director of the Wattis Institute for Contemporary Arts in San Francisco. In addition Hoffmann was director of the Capp Street Project from 2007 to 2012, San Francisco. From 2012 to 2017 he was deputy director of the Jewish Museum (Manhattan) in New York. In 2017 he was guest curator at the Fundación Arte in Buenos Aires.

Since 2006, Hoffmann has worked as a curator and senior advisor for the Kadist Art Foundation, for which he formed the Americana Collection, featuring over 300 works by emerging artists from Latin and North America. He also organized Camera of Wonders for Kadist, bringing together photographic works from the Kadist Art Foundation and the Colección Isabel y Agustín Coppel (CIAC), Mexico City, which opened at the Centro de la Imagen (Center of the Image) in Mexico City in November 2015, and traveled to the Museo de Arte Moderno de Medellín, Colombia in 2016.

Between 2013 and 2017, Hoffmann was the curator for special programs and a member of the selection committee of the New York Jewish Film Festival at Lincoln Center, New York. Hoffmann was a guest curator for the 30th Istanbul Film Festival in 2011, for which he organized a series of screenings Untitled (Film), including films by Peter Watkins, William E. Jones, Ousmane Sembène, Tevfik Başer, Derek Jarman, Guy Debord, Konrad Wolf, and others. In 2012, together with Edoardo Bonaspetti, Andrea Lissoni, and Filipa Ramos, Hoffmann developed the ongoing Vdrome.org, an online platform offering screenings of films and videos directed by visual artists and filmmakers.

In 2007 Hoffmann founded the Museum of Modern Art and Western Antiquities, for which he has curated two exhibitions: Section IV, Department of Light Recordings: Lens Drawings, Marian Goodman Gallery, Paris (2013), and Section III, Department of Pigments on Surface: Very Abstract and Hyper Figurative, Thomas Dane Gallery, London (2007). The next exhibition for the Museum of Modern Art and Western Antiquities will be Section II, Department of Carving and Modeling (2019).

=== People's Biennial ===
In 2009 he founded the People's Biennial with artist Harrell Fletcher. The People's Biennial explores and presents the creative activities of individuals and collectives as expressions of society's cultural diversity that would otherwise be overlooked, neglected, or even actively repressed.

The first edition was organized in 2010 by Independent Curators International (ICI) and toured to five museums in the United States in 2011–2012: Portland Institute for Contemporary Art, Portland, Oregon; Dahl Art Center, Rapid City, South Dakota; Southeastern Center for Contemporary Art, Winston-Salem, North Carolina; Museum of Contemporary Art, Scottsdale, Arizona; and Cantor Fitzgerald Galleries, Haverford College, Haverford, Pennsylvania. The People's Biennial 2014 took place at the Museum of Contemporary Art Detroit.

From 2011 to 2012 Hoffmann and Fletcher operated the one year long People's Gallery in San Francisco's Mission District, presenting solo exhibitions of six artists from the inaugural People's Biennial.

=== Museum of Contemporary Art Detroit ===
Between 2013 and 2016 he was senior curator at large, and from 2017 to 2018, he served as chief curator at large at the Museum of Contemporary Art Detroit (MOCAD). His exhibition, The Past Is Present, opened in September 2013 and looked back at the last 80 years of the city of Detroit with reflection on Diego Rivera's 27-panel mural, Detroit Industry. In February 2014 he co-curated, with Triple Candie, I Cancel All My Works At Death, the first comprehensive survey of the actions and performances of James Lee Byars. Other exhibitions organized by Hoffmann at MOCA Detroit include The People's Biennial 2014 (co-curated with Harrell Fletcher), 2014; Detroit City, ongoing since 2014; United States of Latin America (co-curated with Pablo Leon de la Bara), 2015; 99 Cents, 2017 and Sonic Rebellion: Music as Resistance, 2017. His final exhibition at MOCA Detroit was a solo exhibition by artist Carlos Bunga titled Doubled Architecture, which opened in February 2018.

=== Jewish Museum ===
Hoffmann was deputy director of the Jewish Museum in New York from 2012 until 2016. From 2016 until 2018, Hoffmann served as the director of exhibitions and public programs.

From 2013 to 2017 Hoffmann organized the recurring public program AM at the JM, an event that invited artists to be in conversation with the curator starting at 8am and taking place at Think Coffee at New York's Union Square every other month. Participating artists have included: Erica Baum, Brian Belott, Dara Birnbaum, Christian Boltanski, Andrea Bowers, Luis Camnitzer, Ian Cheng, Clarie Fontaine, Dani Gal, Ryan Gander, Liam Gillick, Nicolas Guaagnini, Camille Henrot, Allan McCollum, Adam McEwen, Ken Okishi, Adam Pendelton, Alix Perlstein, Walter Price, Lucy Raven, Adrian Villar Rojas, Rachel Rose, Eva Rothschild, Erin Shirreff, Taryn Simon and others.

==== Sexual harassment controversy ====
In December 2017, the Jewish Museum suspended Hoffmann from his position following allegations of sexual harassment leveled against him by staff members. The Honolulu Biennial then cut its ties with Hoffmann, the Museum of Contemporary Art Detroit suspended him from his role as chief curator at large (he resigned the position later that month), and the Kadist Art Foundation suspended him from his position as curator and adviser. The 3rd People's Biennial was supposed to take place at the Indianapolis Museum of Contemporary Art in 2019, with Hoffmann co-directing; however, the museum suspended its involvement with Hoffmann after the sexual harassment allegations at the Jewish Museum were not resolved.

On December 17, 2017, the Jewish Museum terminated Hoffmann after a review of the allegations. Hoffmann denied "knowingly or purposefully [behaving] in a bullying, intimidating, harassing, or sexually inappropriate manner."

=== Post–2017 work ===
Hoffman wrote the essay describing the exhibition "Presumed Innocence, or Fifty Shades of Green: On the Work of Anna Weyant" at the 56 Henry gallery in Manhattan that was on show from September through November 2019. He also co-founded the Espacio Mango art gallery in Bogotá, Colombia.

== Teaching ==
From 2003 to 2008 he served as adjunct faculty member in the curatorial studies program at Goldsmiths, University of London.

Hoffmann was guest lecturer at the Nuova Accademia di Belle Arti in Milan from 2004 to 2016 and associate professor at the Graduate Program in Curatorial Practice at California College of the Arts in the San Francisco Bay Area from 2006 to 2012.

In 2012, Hoffmann was visiting professor and co-taught with Carol Yinghua Lu the curatorial course at the 4th Gwangju Biennale.

Hoffmann organized the 2010 Max Wasserman Forum the Massachusetts Institute of Technology, titled Parody, Politics, and Performativity, a forum to address critical issues in contemporary art and culture through arts professionals and which included presentations by artists Tino Sehgal, Tania Bruguera, Joan Jonas, and Claire Fontaine as well as art historians Dorothea von Hantelmann and Frazer Ward.

In 2000 Hoffmann was visiting professor at the department of Critical Writing and Curatorial Practice at Konstfack University College of Arts, Crafts and Design in Stockholm.

== Books and publications ==
Hoffmann has written and edited over three dozen books and exhibition publications.

=== Select books ===
Among his book publications are:

- Hoffman, Jens (2017). (Curating) From A to Z. Hapax Series (2 ed.). JRP Ringier. ISBN 978-3-03764-372-3.
- Hoffman, Jens (2017). The Exhibitionist: Journal on Exhibition Making: The First Six Years. The Exhibitionist. ISBN 978-1942884125. A book publication of 12 issues of The Exhibitionist journal.
- Hoffman, Jens (2017). Show Time: The 50 Most Influential Exhibitions of Contemporary Art (2 ed.). Thames & Hudson Ltd. ISBN 978-0500292624.
- Hoffman, Jens (2015). Theater of Exhibitions. Sternberg Press. ISBN 978-3-95679-087-4.
- Hoffman, Jens (2014). (Curating) From A to Z. Hapax Series (1 ed.). JRP Ringier. ISBN 978-3037643723.
- Hoffman, Jens (2013). Ten Fundamental Questions of Curating. Mousse. ISBN 9788867490530.
- Hoffman, Jens (2012). The Studio. Whitechapel: Documents of Contemporary Art. MIT Press. ISBN 9780262517614.

=== Select co-authored books ===
- Hoffman, Jens; Nahson, Claudia J. (2016). Roberto Burle Marx: Brazilian Modernist. Jewish Museum. ISBN 9780300212150.
- Skerritt, Henry F.; Hoffman, Jens; Fox, William; Carty, John; Circuitt, Edwina (2015). No Boundaries: Aboriginal Australian Contemporary Abstract Painting. Prestel. ISBN 978-3791354491.
- Tumarkin Goodman, Susan; Hoffman, Jens; Lavrentiev, Alexander (2015). The Power of Pictures: Early Soviet Photography, Early Soviet Film. Jewish Museum. ISBN 978-0300207682.
- Pedrosa, Adriano; Hoptman, Laura; Hoffman, Jens (2014). Vitamin 3-D: New Perspectives in Sculpture and Installation. Phaidon Press. ISBN 978-0714868578.
- Hoffman, Jens; Jonas, Joan (2005). Perform. Art Works. Thames & Hudson. ISBN 0500930066.
- Bronson, AA; Hoffman, Jens; Jaar, Alfredo; Grigely, Joseph (2004). The Next Documenta Should Be Curated By An Artist. e-flux/Revolver. ISBN 3937577416.

=== Journals and magazines ===
The Exhibitionist: A Journal on Exhibition Making was founded in 2009 by Hoffmann; the journal has advocated the author theory as developed specifically by François Truffaut in his 1954 essay "Une certaine tendance du cinéma français" ("A certain tendency in French cinema") and adapted Truffaut's ideas to the sphere of exhibition making. Hoffman is the editor of The Exhibitionist.

Hoffmann has been editor-at-large for Mousse magazine since 2011 and is a frequent contributor to Frieze and Artforum. He has written for Parkett, Texte zur Kunst, DOMUS, and Critique d'Arts, and was a columnist for Purple from 2001 to 2003 as well as a correspondent for Flash Art from 2002 to 2007.
