= Harrell Fletcher =

American artist and professor

- Born: 1967 (age 58–59); Santa Maria, California
- Education: California College of Arts and Crafts, San Francisco Art Institute
- Known for: relational art, video art, performance, and sculpture
- Notable work: Portland, Oregon
- Movement: Social practice (art)

Harrell Fletcher (born 1967) is an American social practice and relational aesthetics artist and professor, living in Portland, Oregon.

== Biography ==
Harrell Fletcher was born in 1967 in Santa Maria, California and attended Santa Maria High School. Fletcher received his B.F.A. in 1990 from the San Francisco Art Institute (SFAI) and his M.F.A. in 1994 from California College of the Arts (CCA). At CCA, Fletcher studied under Suzanne Lacy. In 1995, Fletcher completed an apprenticeship at UCSC at the farm, studying ecological horticulture.

In 2007, Fletcher founded the Art + Social Practice Program in the School of Art + Design at Portland State University, where he is still on faculty.

== Projects ==
His fellow CCA student Jon Rubin, and Fletcher collaborated for several years in the Bay Area following the completion of his M.F.A., and together creating Gallery Here in nearby Oakland. Gallery Here was in a vacant storefront in their Oakland neighborhood and it hosted neighborhood centered art exhibitions for a year. The artists produced collaborative projects that occurred in non-traditional and municipally-managed art spaces. Fletcher became known for making projects in collaboration with strangers and non-artists.

=== Learning to Love You More ===
With artist Miranda July, Fletcher founded the online arts project called Learning to Love You More (2002–2009). The project's website offered assignments to artists whose submissions became part of "an ever-changing series of exhibitions, screenings and radio broadcasts presented all over the world". In addition to its internet presentations, Learning to Love You More has been compiled for exhibitions for the Whitney Museum, the Seattle Art Museum, and other hosts. A book version of the project's online art was released in 2007. The project is now part of the San Francisco Museum of Modern Art (SFMOMA) Collection.

=== People's Biennial ===
From 2010–2017, Fletcher co-curated with Jens Hoffmann the People's Biennial. The People’s Biennial explored and presented the creative activities of individuals and collectives as expressions of society’s cultural diversity that would otherwise be overlooked, neglected, or even actively repressed.

=== King School Museum of Contemporary Art ===
Starting in 2014, Fletcher co-founded with Portland State University (PSU) faculty Lisa Jarrett, the King School Museum of Contemporary Art (KSMOCA), located within a preK-8 grade public school in northeast Portland, Oregon. The museum opens to the public several times a year during art exhibition openings and special events, such as public lectures and an annual art fair. KSMOCA had its first International Art Fair in 2017.

Tender Feelings Press

During his residency at Marin Headlands Center for the Arts, Fletcher unpacked 33 years worth of accumulated refuse salvaged from his parents' attic, and invited anyone who stopped by his studio to take a piece of his past with them. He also collected sundry stories written on scraps of paper by his friend Jess Hilliard, which he collated into the book, "Hi, Friend." (Alternate title: "Remember When We Used To Make Out.") So far, "Hi, Friend" is the only book published by Fletcher's Tender Feelings Press.

== Awards and honors ==
In 2002 he won the Creative Capital award. He was a participant in the 2004 Whitney Biennial. In 2005 he won the Alpert Awards in the Arts and a residency at ArtPace.

In 2011, he was an artist in residence at Exploratorium, and won an award from Americans for the Arts for Outstanding Public Artwork. He has been in residence at Capp Street Project at the Wattis Institute for Contemporary Arts in 2011. In 2014, he was an artist in residence with his Portland-based art collective Public Doors and Windows (PDW) which includes artists Molly Sherman, and Nolan Calisch, at Institute of the Arts and Sciences (IAS) at University of California, Santa Cruz.

== Museum collections ==
Fletcher's work is held in the following permanent collections:

- The American War (2005), Museum of Modern Art, New York City, New York
- Learning to Love You More, (2002–2009) co-created with Miranda July, San Francisco Museum of Modern Art, San Francisco
- This container isn't big enough (2004) art book, SAIC Digital Collections, School of the Art Institute of Chicago (SAIC)
- FRAC Bretagne Fond Régional d'Art contemporain (Regional Fund for Contemporary Art), Rennes, France
