= Nevada Museum of Art =

Art museum in Nevada, United States

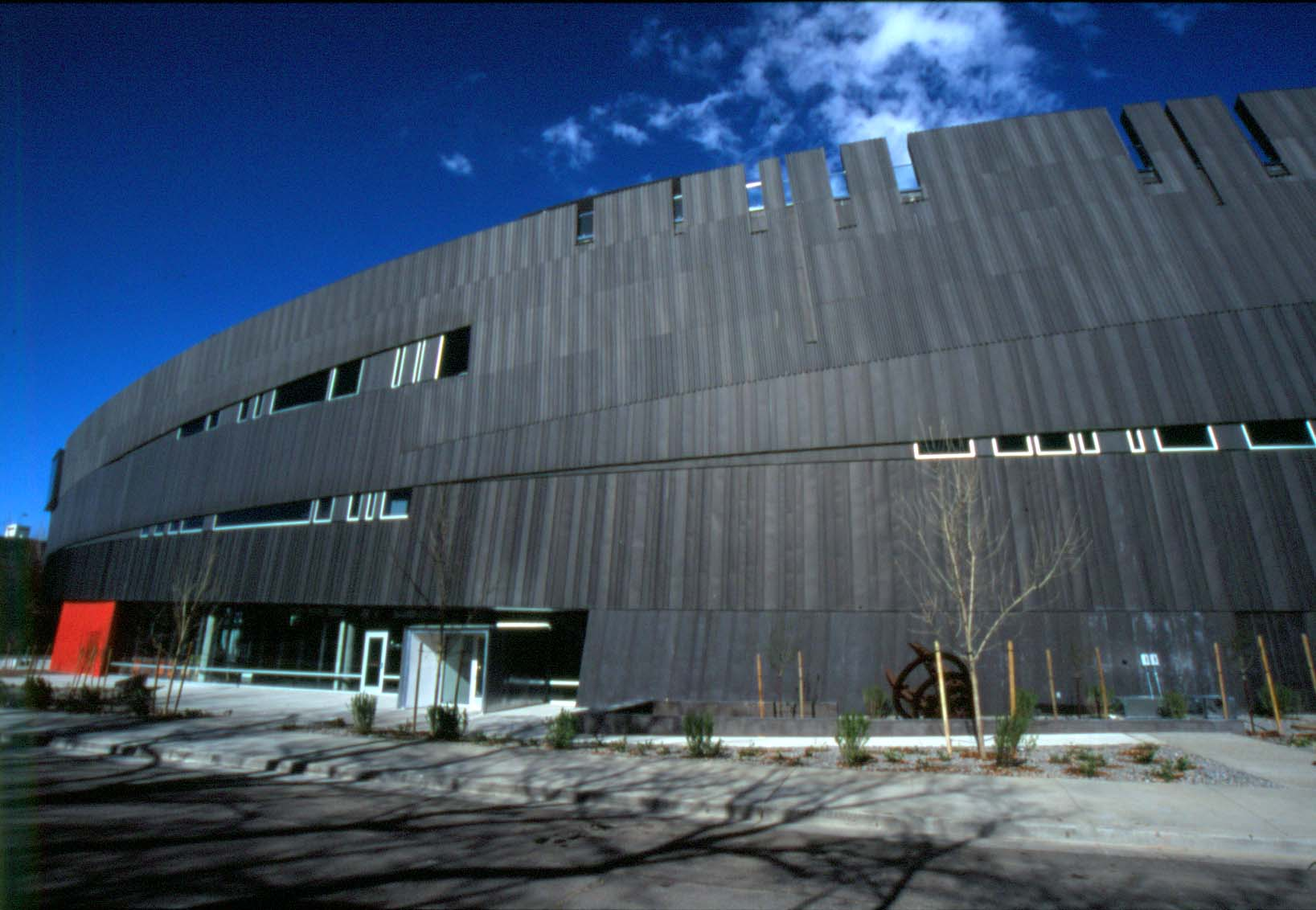
- Established: 1931
- Location: Reno, Nevada
- Coordinates: 39.52099°N 119.813384°W
- Type: Art museum
- Collection size: 1900
- Director: David B. Walker
- Curator: Apsara DiQuinzio
- Website: www.nevadaart.org

The Nevada Museum of Art is an art museum in Reno, Nevada. Located at 160 West Liberty Street in Reno, it is the only American Alliance of Museums (AAM) accredited art museum in the state of Nevada. The museum has chosen a thematic approach, placing a special emphasis on human interaction with the land and the protection of nature in its collections and exhibitions. It is globally considered a leading institution and repository for Land art and Earthworks, holding extensive archival materials. In 2003, the museum moved into a new building designed by architect Will Bruder. In 2024, the Museum began construction on a 50,000 square foot expansion to the Museum, which fully opened in August 2025.

The museum's Permanent Collection, which consists of more than 5,000 works of 19th through 21st-century art, is divided into four focus areas unified by an overarching focus on natural, built and virtual environments. This thematic, rather than historical or stylistic specialization is a natural outgrowth of the institution's collecting practices over the years and offers varied perspectives on the ways in which humans interact with the environments.

"As curator of exhibitions and collections," Curator at Large Ann Wolfe explains, “the images suggest that the earth's surface offers an irrefutable record of some of civilization's most impressive endeavors – as well as its worst failures.”

== Contemporary Collection ==
The museum's rapidly expanding Contemporary Collection is devoted to work by national and international artists. Paintings, works on paper, photography, sculpture, digital media, and mixed media installations created by living artists shed new light on contemporary society. Their curators seek out works that reflect the institutional commitment to artists’ creative interactions with natural, built, and virtual environments. Notable artists in their expanding collection include Tim Hawkinson, Andrea Zittel, Petah Coyne, and Lordy Rodriguez.

== The Altered Landscape: Carol Franc Buck Collection ==
This is the museum's largest focus collection and features contemporary landscape photographs. Since its establishment in the early 1990s, the collection has aimed to address and engage issues related to land use and the changing landscape. While the collection represents a diversity of artists, techniques, visual styles, subjects, and ideological positions, it is unified by two basic principles:

- A concern for inspiring dialogue about the impact of human activity on natural environments
- An effort to depart from idealized notions of scenic beauty and pristine wilderness that were dominant in the early 20th century.

In 1998, an endowment for Altered Landscape acquisitions was established through the generosity of the Carol Franc Buck Foundation. In 2011, a major book on the collection was co-published by the Nevada Museum of Art and Skira Rizzoli; it received the Frances Smyth Ravenal prize for the best publication designed by an art museum in the United States in 2012. There are 150 images by 100 photographers in The Altered Landscape book, culled from more than 900 photographs the museum has amassed in its collection since the 1970s.

== The Robert S. and Dorothy J. Keyser Art of the Greater West Collection ==
The Art of the Greater West Collection broadens conventional definitions of the West by expanding the scope of the collection's geographic emphasis to encompass a region generally bounded from Alaska to Patagonia and from Australia to the United States Intermountain West. While this collection's roots are grounded in the Sierra Nevada/Great Basin region, new acquisitions make connections between the diverse cultures and artistic practices of the Western region.

== The E.L. Wiegand Collection ==
This collection centers around the theme of the work ethic in American art, including paintings that depict varied manifestations of work, laborers, or work environments. Highlights of this collection include 19th and 20th century works by Carl Oscar Borg, Lorser Feitelson, Lovell Birge Harrison, Helen Lundeberg, Guy Pène du Bois, Elsie Palmer Payne, Jacob Getlar Smith, Moses Soyer, and Grandma Moses.

== Institute for Art + Environment ==
The Institute for Art + Environment in the museum was formed in 2009 as an initiative surrounding the interaction of people and the natural, built, and virtual environments. The Institute serves as the museum's research department, and its Archive Collections house more than 50 archives comprising 1.6 million items that represent work from more than 500 artists working on all seven continents. Significant archives include materials from Earthworks artists Michael Heizer, Walter De Maria and Lita Albuquerque, environmental architects such as Rodrigo Perez de Arce in Chile, Smout Allen in England, and Richard Black in Australia, and the ongoing programs of the Center for Land Use Interpretation (CLUI) and Land Arts of the American West. The IA+E is the only research institute in the world devoted to the study of art and the environment.

The Institute for Art + Environment hosts a triennial Art + Environment Summit (previously known as Conference). The first Art + Environment Conference took place in 2008 with speakers: Matthew Coolidge of the Center for Land Use Interpretation, artist and architect Vito Acconci, photographer Michael Light, artists Fritz Haeg and Katie Holten, Bill Gilbert from Land Arts of the American West, and cultural organizer Cheryl Haines, and Geoff Manaugh of BLDGBLOG.

The second Art + Environment Conference took place in 2011 and featured speakers: Diana Al-Hadid, Subhankar Banerjee, David Benjamin, Richard Black, Edward Burtynsky, Gaetano Carboni, John Carty, Pilar Cereceda, William L. Fox, Amy Franceschini, Fritz Haeg, Newton Harrison and Helen Mayer Harrison of The Harrisons Studio, Laura Jackson, Patricia Johanson, Chris Jordan, Thomas Kellein, Geoff Manaugh, Mandy Martin, Christie Mazuera-Davis, Paul D. Miller, Gerald Nanson, Jorge Pardo, Rodrigo Pérez de Arce, John Reid, Alexander Rose, Sean Shepherd, Mark Smout, Bruce Sterling, Nicola Twilley, Leo Villareal, Stephen G. Wells, Ann M. Wolfe, Liam Young.

The third Art + Environment Conference took place in 2014 and featured speakers: JoAnne Northrup, Adam Duncan Harris, Claude d’Anthenaise, Petah Coyne, Bryndis Snæbjörnsdóttir, Mark Wilson, Bruce Sterling, Geoff Manaugh, Nicola Twilley, Yvonne Force Villareal, Elmgreen & Dragset, David Brooks, Kenneth Baker, Ugo Rondinone, John Giorno, William L. Fox, Mandy Martin, Dennis Scholl, Jamie Brown, John Carty, Guy Fitzhardinge, Henry Skerritt, Edward Morris, Susanna Sayler, Lauren Bon, Susannah Sayler, Helen Mayer Harrison, Newton Harrison, Ken Goldberg, Fernanda Viégas, Martin Wattenberg, Terry Evans, Elizabeth Farnsworth, Maya Lin.

== Scholastic Art Awards ==
The Nevada Museum of Art has hosted the Scholastic Art Awards for nearly two decades, providing northern and central Nevada middle and high school students with an opportunity to have their artworks judged regionally, win college scholarships, and compete in the national Scholastic Art and Writing Awards competition. The Scholastic Art Awards competition runs annually. The works are judged by a panel of local artists and art professionals. The annual competition concludes with an exhibition held at both the Museum and the University of Nevada, Reno, Sheppard Gallery, and a public awards ceremony where students, parents, teachers and community members honor the regional award winners.

As part of the Scholastic Art Awards, the Museum offers $5000 in collegiate scholarships annually to twelfth-grade students who submitted exemplary portfolios in the competition.

== The E.L. Cord Museum School ==
The Nevada Museum of Art is one of the few art museums in the United States that has a museum school on the campus. The E.L Cord Museum School provides various art classes year-round, that are tuition based to help develop art-related skills for artists of all ages (infant through senior) and teachers, promoting lifelong learning.
