= Lordy =

Lordy may refer to:

- Lordy Rodriguez (born 1976), Filipino artist
- Lordy Tugade (born 1977), Filipino basketball player
- "I am Going to the Lordy", an 1882 poem

== See also ==
- Lordi
- Lorde
