= Claire Fontaine =

French conceptual art persona created by Fulvia Carnevale and James Thornhill

- Born: Founded in Paris, France 2004
- Education: Università degli Studi di Padova, Paris VIII / Glasgow School of Art
- Known for: Conceptual art, Human Strike, ready-made artist
- Notable work: Foreigners Everywhere (Arabic), 2005, In God They Trust, 2004
- Website: http://www.clairefontaine.ws

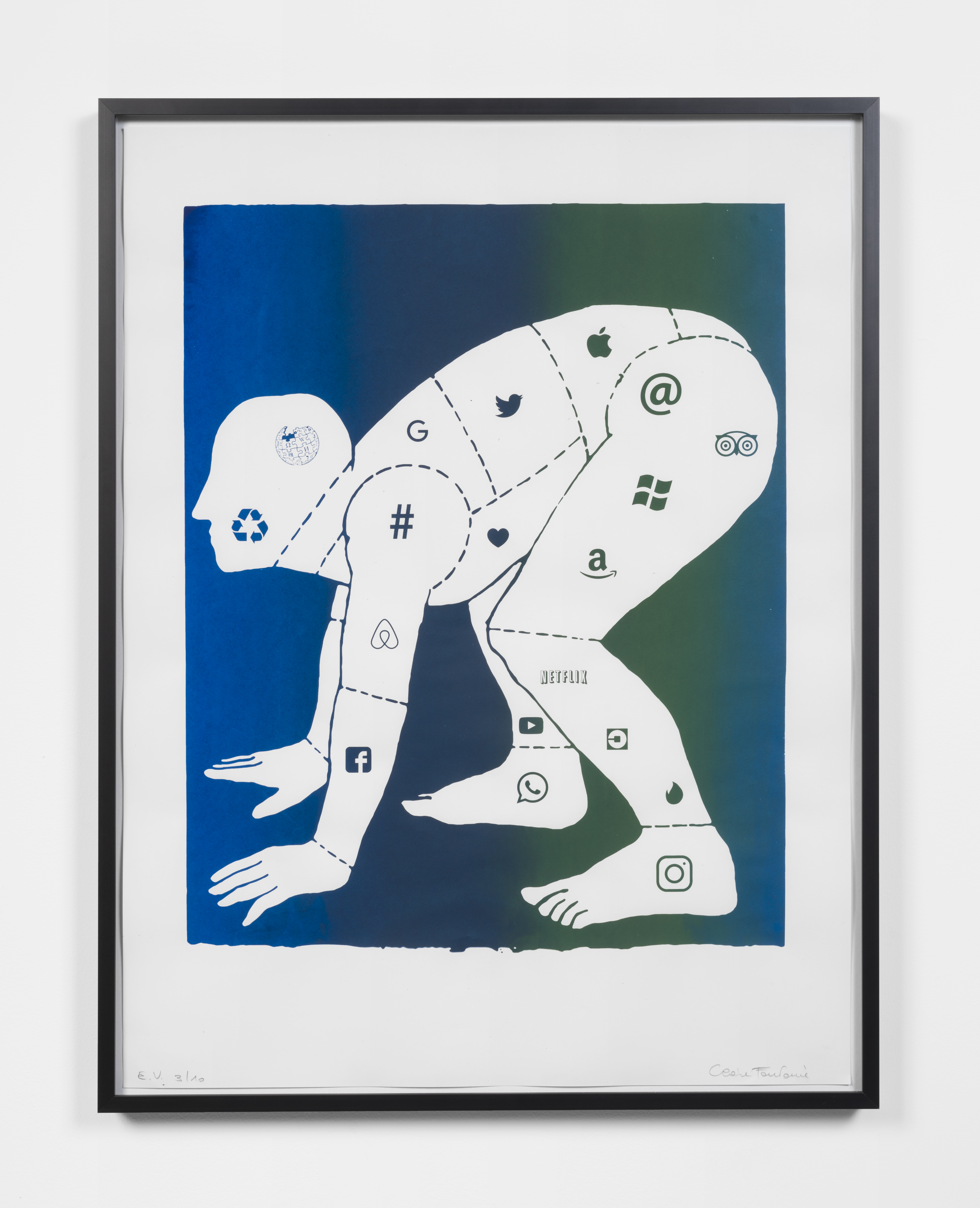
Claire Fontaine, Untitled (on vous intoxique!) (2018)

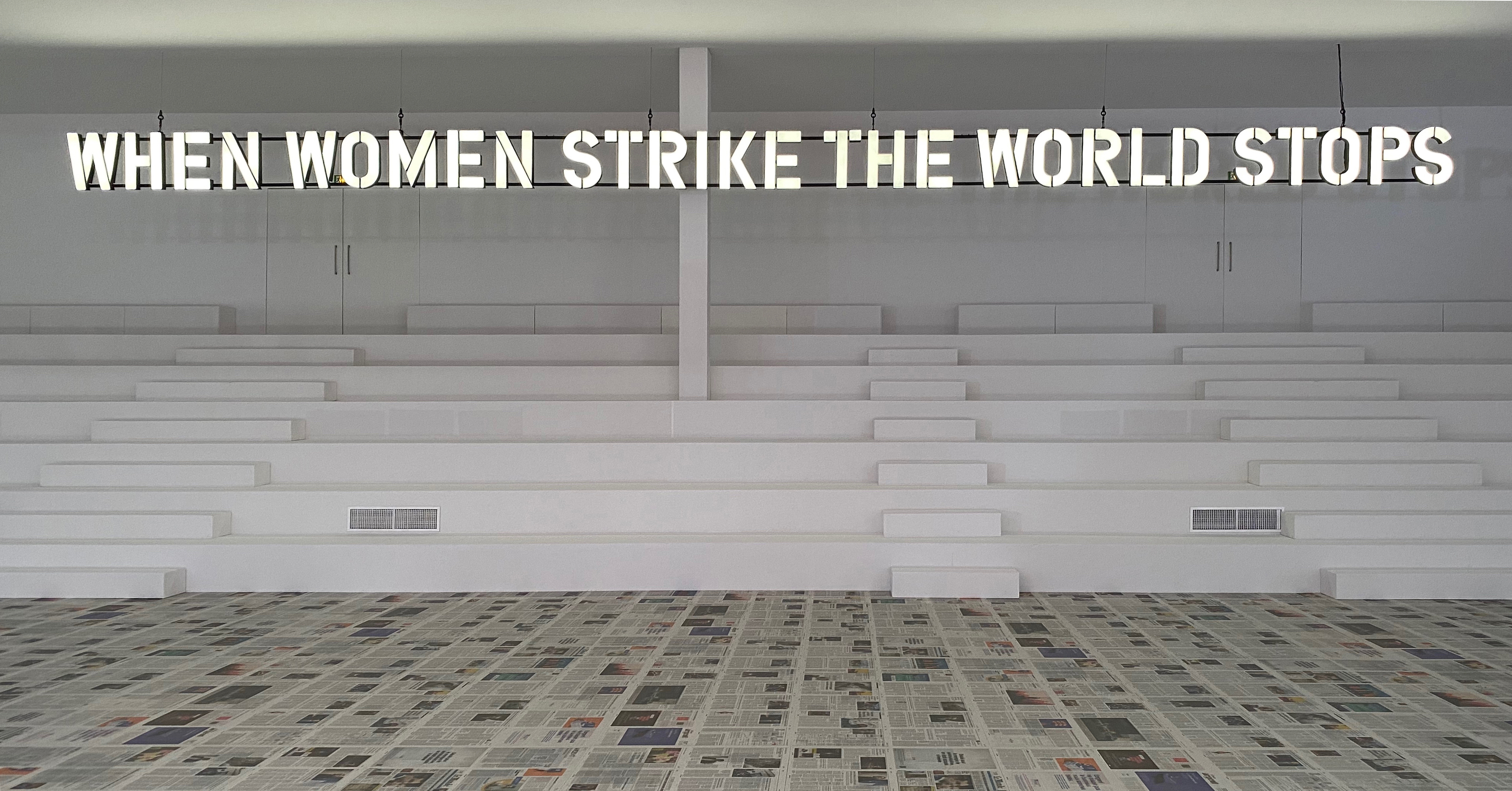
When women strike the world stops (2020)/ Newsfloor (Le Monde Pixelisé) (2020)

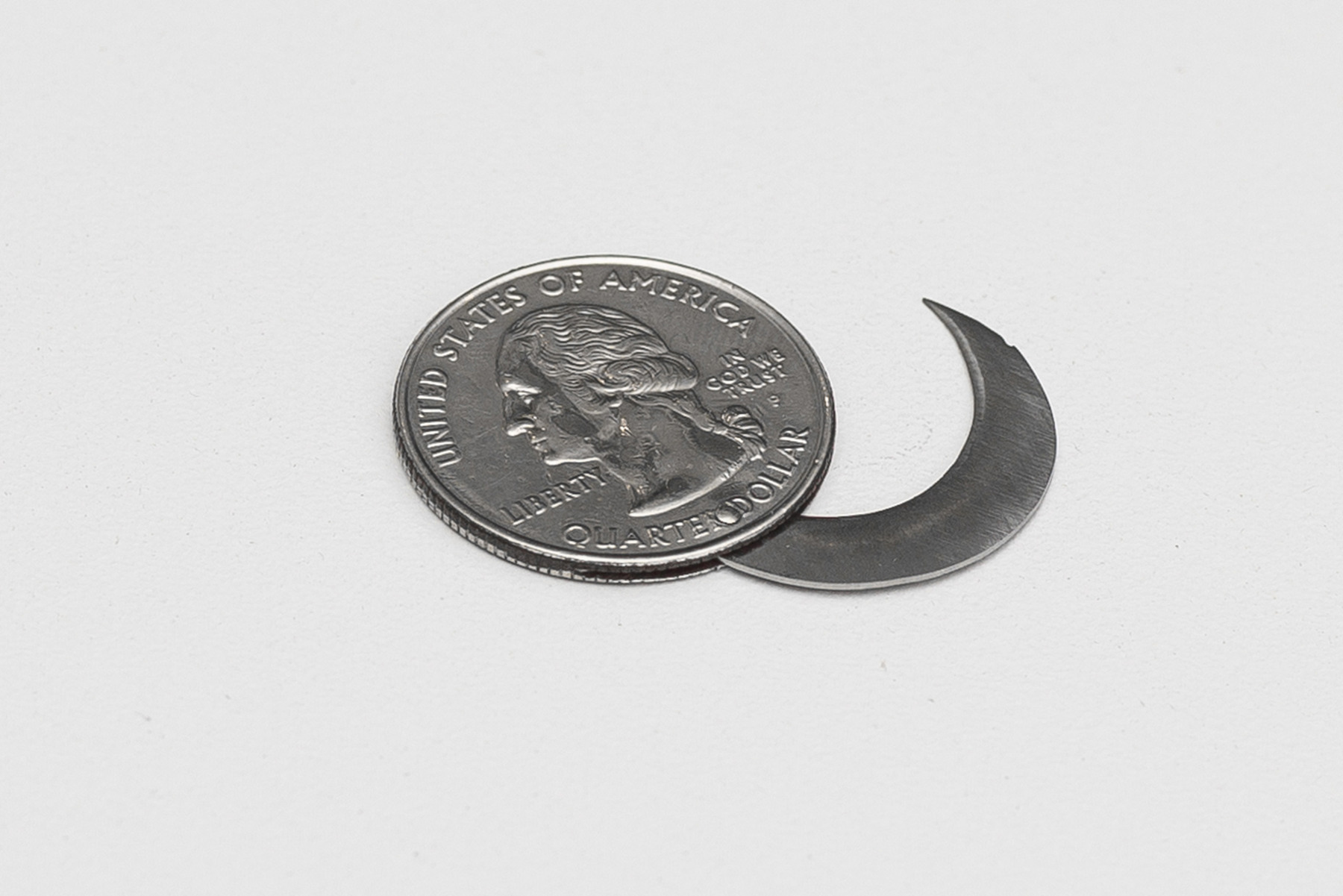
Claire Fontaine, In God They Trust (2005). Twenty-five-cent coin, steel box-cutter blade, solder and rivet.

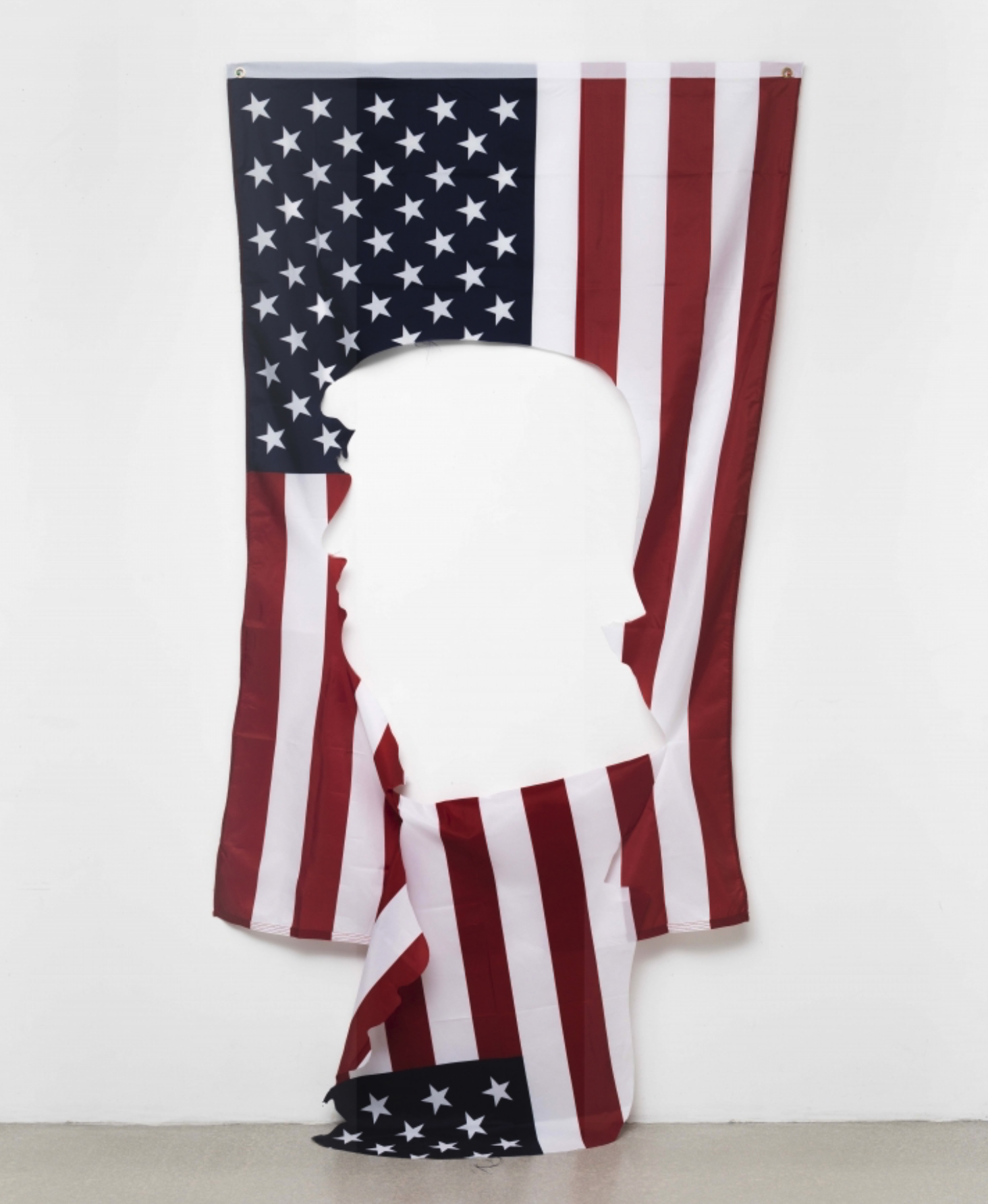
Claire Fontaine, Untitled (Negative) (2016)

Claire Fontaine is a feminist conceptual art persona created in Paris in 2004 by Fulvia Carnevale and James Thornhill, an Italian-British artist duo who declared themselves her "assistants". Since 2018 Claire Fontaine lives and works in Palermo and has a studio in the historical centre of the Kalsa near Piazza Magione.

After lifting her name from a popular brand of French school notebooks and stationery, Claire Fontaine declared herself a readymade artist and began to elaborate a version of neo-conceptual art that often looks like other people's work. Claire Fontaine translated into English means "Clear Fountain" and can also be conceptually linked to the artwork Fountain by Marcel Duchamp, known as the most famous readymade.

== Work ==
Claire Fontaine uses the concept of the readymade as a way of criticising "production" disguised as a creation of more and more artefacts that are desirable because they superficially appear as new. Generally she works with appropriation on a formal level and she hijacks contents, using sculpture, installation, video and painting to create an emotionally loaded criticism of the author and the forms of authority at this stage of capitalism. This aesthetic approach that she describes as "expropriation", a way of giving an existential use value to pre-existing objects and artworks, also addresses the general crisis of singularity, which she describes as the individual and collective impossibility to give a meaning to one's life under the current political circumstance and the systematic surveillance, repression and countless limitations of our freedom. Claire Fontaine prefers to integrate the existing art circuit to create complicities and foster change which entails partaking in the mechanisms and subjects of the art industry including collectors, dealers and institutions.

In an Interview with Circa Art Magazine in 2008 she states: "I think forming gangs, mafias, collectives, networks, bands of people is a way to survive in the hostile capitalist system and then eventually a way to become a pressure group, in order to transform these particular conditions."

Writing and text based pieces play an important role in Claire Fontaine's work. She distributes texts in her exhibitions and she uses different registers in her writing such as poetry, critical theory, essays and manifestos. The artist criticises the hierarchy between visual and verbal expression.

In February 2020 she was invited by Maria Grazia Chiuri to create the mise-en-scène for Dior's Autumn/Winter 2020 collection for Paris Fashion Week which took place in the Les Tuileries. The artist used the catwalk to perform an operation of Institutional Critique investing the floor and the ceiling; she presented Newsfloor (Le Monde Pixelisé) (2020) and several large suspended LED signs stating for example: Patriarchy Kills Love, When women strike the world stops, Feminine beauty is a ready-made or Patriarchy = Climate emergency.

Claire Fontaine's work, "Foreigners Everywhere" was chosen as the official title for the 2024 Venice Biennale, where a series of her neon sign sculptures of the words "foreigners everywhere" was also displayed in multiple languages at the Biennale for the first time under the arches of the Arsenale, looking out to the Grand Canal.

== Monographs ==
- Newsfloor, Jaleh Mansoor (Author), Anita Chari (Author), Walther König, ISBN 9783960986898 (01.01.2020)
- Viaggio in Sicilia, Free Energy, Vito Planeta (Author), Valentina Bruschi (Author), Leonardo Sciascia (Author), Donatien Grau (Author), Planeta, ISBN 9791220050180 (2019)
- Foreigners Everywhere by Hal Foster (Author), Bernard Blistène (Author), Nicolas Liucci-Goutnikov (Author), Letizia Ragalia (Introduction), Walther König, Köln; Bilingual edition ISBN 3863351703 (31/03/ 2013)
- Economies, Ruba Katrib, Tom McDonough, Museum of Contemporary Art, North Miami, ISBN 1888708387 (June 3, 2010)

== Books ==
- Human Strike and the Art of Creating Freedom, Hal Foster (Forward), Semiotext(e), Dec. 2020 ISBN 978-1635901368
- Lo sciopero umano e l'arte di creare la libertà (Italian), Ilaria Bussoni (Forward) DeriveApprodi, 2017, ISBN 978-8865481981
- La Grève humaine: et l'art de créer la liberté, Diaphanes, 2020 ISBN 2889280462
- The Human Strike Has Already Begun & Other Essays, Mute, 2013. Print ISBN 978-1-906496-88-3; eBook ISBN 978-1-906496-89-0
- Notas sobre économia libidinal, MUSAC, 2011, edited by Maria Ines Rodriguez
- Some Instructions for the Sharing of Private Property, One Star Press, 2011
- Vivre, Vaincre, Editions Dilecta, ISBN 978-2-916275-50-5 2009

== Writings ==
- Towards a Theory of Magic Materialism, Vers une théorie du matérialisme magique, Diaphanes, Issue 8/9 Winter 2019/20
- Making Life (im)possible in Jens Hoffmann, In the Meantime. Speculations on Art, Curating, and Exhibitions, Sternberg Press, 2020, ISBN 9783956794919
- The Visitor as a Commercial Partner: Notes on the 58th Venice Biennale, E-flux Journal No. 102 – September 2019
- L'anno in cui la paura andò in sciopero in È solo l'inizio. Rifiuto, affetti, creatività nel lungo '68, edited by I. Bussoni, N. Martino, Ombre Corte, 2018, ISBN 9788869481079
- If our Lives are Black. On Angela Davis and Gina Dent's conference at La Maison de l'Amérique Latine, Paris, May Quarterly Journal, #.17, 14 March 2017
- Boredom, edited by Tom McDonough, Documents of Contemporary Art, 2017, ISBN 9780262533447
- 1977. L'anno dello sciopero umano, Cultura, Il manifesto, 05.04.2017
- Our Common Critical Condition, E-flux Journal No. 73 – 05. 2016
- Weed and the Practice of Freedom, May Quarterly Journal, #.16, 2016
- Towards a Canonic Freedom, Texte zur Kunst, Issue 100, 2015
- We Are All Clitoridian Women: Notes on Carla Lonzi's Legacy, E-flux Journal No. 47 – September 2013
- Krebber in Bordeaux, Texte zur Kunst Issue 89, 2013
- Invisible Curators, Texte zur Kunst, Issue 86, 2012
- Draft for aesthetic subjects anaesthetic object, Flashart, January–February 2010
- Entrée en matière, May Quarterly Journal, #.4. 06. 2010
- Toward an Imageless Political Education, Diacritics, a review of contemporary criticism, Johns Hopkins University Press, Vol. 39 no.23, ISSN 1080-6539, Fall 2009
- The Emancipated Reader, May Quarterly Journal, #.1 06. 2009
- Human strike within the field of libidinal economy, Descent to Revolution, edited by James Voorhies, pp. 144–151, Bureau for Open Culture, ISBN 0979747643 2009
- Preface to Coco Fusco, Petit manuel de torture à l'usage des femmes-soldats, Les Prairies Ordinaires, Paris

== Interviews ==
- L'immanenza del linguaggio: un dialogo con Claire Fontaine, Anita Chari, Simone Ciglia, Flashart Italia, June 2020
- L'arte di essere libere, Interview with Eva Morletto, Grazia, no. 23 21.05.2020
- Claire Fontaine Collective Capital, Interview with Evrim Oralkan, Collecteurs, March 2020
- Pretend to be dead, An Interview with Claire Fontaine, Kyra Kordoski, White Fungus, 2015
- Giving Shape to Painful Things, Interview Andrew Culp and Ricky Crano, Radical Philosophy, RP175 (Sept/Oct 2012)
- Claire Fontaine. La nostra Italia bruciata che non-cambia mai, Laura Larcan, La Repubblica, 3/2/2012
- Grève humaine (interrompue), a conversation between Fulvia Carnevale and John Kelsey, May Quarterly Journal, No. 4 March 2010
- In Life There is No Purity, Only Struggle, Interview with Bart van der Heide, Metropolis M magazine (February/March 2009)
- Acts of Freedom, Interview with Niels Van Tomme, Arts and Papers 33.06 (September 2009)
- The Glue and the Wedge: The Cases of Claire Fontaine and Canell and Watkins, Isobel Harbison and Ilaria Gianni No. 124, Circa Art Magazine 2008
- Macht Arbeit, Interview with Stephanie Kleefeld Texte zur Kunst, Issue 73, 2009
- Claire Fontaine by Anthony Huberman, Bomb Magazine No. 105, 10.2008

== Solo exhibitions ==
- 2005: Claire Fontaine, Galerie Meerrettich im Glaspavillon an der Volksbühne, Berlin
- 2005: Foreigners Everywhere, Reena Spaulings Fine Art, New York US

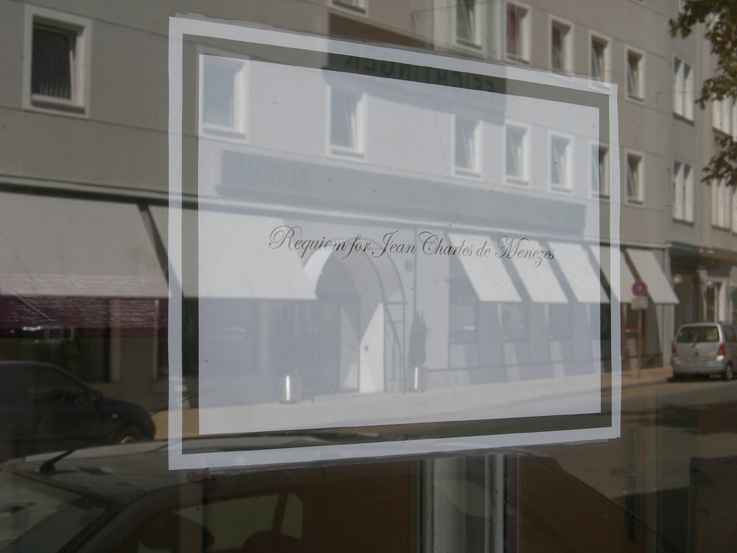
Requiem for Jean-Charles de Menezes (2005)

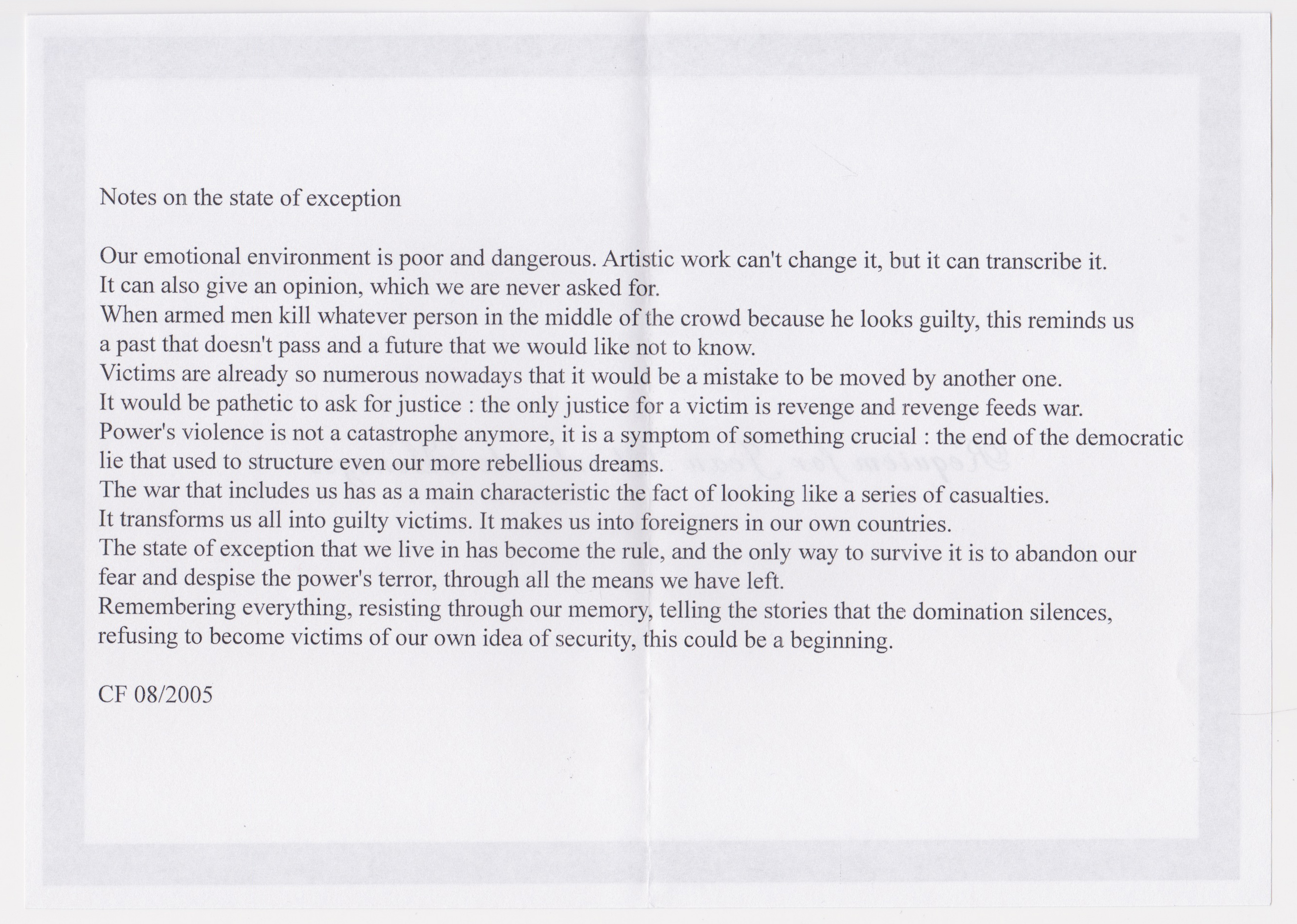
- Requiem for Jean Charles de Menezes : Notes on the state of Exception (2005). Text pile or window announcement, A5 double-sided photocopy, no copyright.
  2005: Requiem for Jean-Charles de Menezes, Tratari, Graz AT
- 2005: Étrangers Partout, 21 rue Ste Marthe, Paris FR
- 2006: Siamo tutti singolarità qualunque, Il piccolo Museion, progetto Garutti, Museion Bolzano IT
- 2006: Couvrir Les Feux, Zoo Galerie, Nantes, FR
- 2007: Équivalences, Le Centre d'Art Villa Arson, Nice
- 2007: The 00's, The history of a decade that has not yet been named, Biennale d'Art Contemporain de Lyon 2007, Institut d'Art Contemporaine, Villeurbanne, Lyon FR
- 2007: Get Lost, Module, Palais de Tokyo, Paris FR
- 2007: How to? Kunsthalle Zurich, CH
- 2007: Taccuini Di Guerra Incivile, T293, Napoli IT
- 2007: Téléphone Arabe, Air de Paris, Paris FR
- 2007: Footnotes on the state of exception, Reena Spaulings Fine Art, New York US 01.07
- 2008: Perplexed in Public, Lisson Gallery, London UK
- 2009: Is freedom therapeutic?, Barock: art, science, faith and technology in the contemporary age (curators: Eduardo Cicelyn, Mario Codognato), Museo d'Arte Contemporanea Donna Regina, Napoli
- 2011: No Family Life, Air de Paris, Paris
- 2012: Généralités, La Douane, Galerie Chantal Crousel, Paris
- 2013: Redemptions, C.C.A. Wattis, San Francisco
- 2014: Using Walls, Floors, and Ceilings, The Jewish Museum, New York
- 2015: Stop Seeking Approval, Metro Pictures, New York
- 2016: May our enemies not prosper, Galerie Neu, Berlin
- 2018: Same war time zone, Holding Contemporary, Portland, OR
- 2019: Les printemps seront silencieux, Confort Moderne, Poiters FR
- 2019: La borsa e la vita, Palazzo Ducale di Genova, Genova, IT
- 2019: Claire Fontaine, Rolli Days, Strade e palazzo da vivere, Banca Carige, Sede Centrale, Genova, IT
- 2019: OK NO, Synnika, Frankfurt DE
- 2019: Ettore Majorana, Viaggio in Siclia, Planeta Sciaranuova, Castiglione di Sicilia IT 2009
- 2019: Too late to read, Longtang, Zurich CH
- 2019: Your Money and Your Life, Galeria Av. Da Índia: Tomadas, Lisbon PT
