= Martin Luther King Jr. School Museum of Contemporary Art =

Coordinates: 45°33′29.0″N 122°39′32.5″W

The Dr Martin Luther King Jr School Museum of Contemporary Art
- Location: Portland, Oregon, U.S.
- Type: Art Museum
- Website: www.ksmoca.com

The Dr Martin Luther King Jr School Museum of Contemporary Art (KSMoCA), formerly the King School Museum of Contemporary Art, is a contemporary art museum and a social practice art project at the Dr Martin Luther King Jr Elementary School, part of Portland Public Schools in Portland, Oregon. KSMoCA was founded by artists and Portland State University professors Lisa Jarrett and Harrell Fletcher in 2014. At KSMoCA, elementary school students interact with contemporary art and living artists on an everyday basis through exhibitions, workshops, lecture series, one-on-one mentorships, and other KSMoCA programs. Students get an opportunity to learn how a real art museum functions from the inside and are encouraged to actively co-create its activities by participating in different initiatives within the museum. Students create works with artists, curate exhibitions, organize art fairs, design posters, write press releases, etc.

International Art Fair took place at KSMoCA in 2017. KSMoCA has a permanent collection of contemporary art housed in the school's hallways and a gallery with rotating exhibitions curated by students. In 2015, students curated Postcards from America, an exhibition featuring photographs from Magnum Photos.

The Dr Martin Luther King Jr Elementary School is located in the King neighborhood, a historically African American neighborhood in Northeast Portland, and has a diverse student body with the third highest percentage of Black students among Portland public elementary schools. To better reflect the diverse student community and provide students with positive images of professionals who come from similar diverse backgrounds, KSMoCA prioritizes working with artists of color.
