= Michael Buthe =

German artist (1944–1994)

- Born: 1 August 1944; Sonthofen, Bavaria, Germany
- Died: 15 November 1994 (aged 50); Bonn, Germany
- Education: Kunsthochschule Kassel

Michael Buthe (1 August 1944 – 15 November 1994) was a German artist who lived and worked between Germany and Morocco. He exhibited widely throughout Europe during his life and is known for his eclectic and prolific oeuvre which encompasses painting, sculpture, and installation.

== Life and career ==
Michael Buthe was born on 1 August 1944 in Sonthofen in southern Germany to a Roman Catholic family. From 1964 to 1968, he studied at the Werkkunstschule, Kassel, now the Kunsthochschule Kassel. Thereafter he studied at Kunstakademie Düsseldorf as master student of Joseph Beuys. He began exhibiting in 1968, participating in Harald Szeeman’s landmark exhibition When Attitude Becomes Form: Live in Your Head at the Kunsthalle Bern the year after. Some of his most notable works during this time consisted of paintings made by cutting into the fabric and exposing the stretcher bars.

In the 1970s, Buthe began to travel extensively to Africa and the Middle East, most notably to Morocco where he took up extended residences in the cities of Essaouira and Marrakesh. His foreign stays heavily influenced his work, incorporating the sights and sounds of the countries he visited into his visual language. The experiences likewise spurned on engagements with spiritual and individual mythological elements in Buthes’ work.

Buthe likewise began to create installation works from the 1970s onward. In 1972, he attempted to bring Gnawa musicians to documenta 5, envisioning them performing in traditional tents. Given their minority status in Morocco—therefore lacking Moroccan passports—the musicians were barred from performing internationally. Though he was unable to fully realize this project, Buthe was galvanized to further develop his immersive, large-scale works.

Buthe was also a professor at the Kunstakademie Düsseldorf from 1983 until his death at the age of 50 in 1994. Amongst others, Klaus Girnus and Stefan Kürten were two of his master students. Despite enjoying success throughout Europe, he was relatively under-discussed amongst his contemporaries in America, but has come under recent re-examination with a number of posthumous solo and group exhibitions.

His work was well collected by museums both during his lifetime and in recent years. Significant representations of his work can be found in S.M.A.K - Stedelijk Museum voor Actguele Kunst, Ghent; Tate Britain, London; Centre Georges Pompidou, Paris; and Kolumba, the Art Museum of the Archdiocese of Cologne, as well as the Museum Ludwig, also in Cologne.

== Selected exhibitions ==
=== Selected solo exhibitions ===
- 2016: Michael Buthe and Ingvild Goetz - A friendship, Sammlung Goetz, Munich
- 2015-16: Michael Buthe, Kunstmuseum Luzern, Switzerland; S.M.A.K. - Stedelijk Museum voor Actuele Kunst, Ghent; Haus der Kunst, Munich
- 2013: Secrets, Alexander and Bonin, New York
- 2009: Michael Buthe: The Angel and His Shadow, Arp-Museum Bahnhof, Rolandseck
- 1999: Michael Buthe: Frühe Zeichnungen, Collagen und Tagebücher, Kunsthalle Bielefeld
- 1989: Primavera Pompeijana, Württembergischer Kunstverein, Stuttgart
- 1985: Michel de la Sainte Beauté, Galerie Moderne Kunst Dietmar Werle, Cologne
- 1980: Die endlose Reise der Bilder, Museum Folkwang, Essen, Germany
- 1975: Colonia, Agrippinensis, Babylonia, Africanus, Dei, Galerie Abis, Berlin
- 1973: Le Dieux de Babylon, Kölnischer Kunstverein, Cologne; Kunstmuseum Luzern, Switzerland
- 1971: Hommage an die Sonne, Galerie Toni Gerber, Bern, Switzerland

=== Selected group exhibitions ===
- 2014-15: Playing by heart, Kolumba, Cologne
- 2012: La Triennale "Intense Proximity”, Palais de Tokyo and other venues, Paris
- 2001: 70er Jahre, Kunstmusem Luzern, Switzerland
- 1995: Auf Papier, Schirn Kunsthalle, Frankfurt
- 1989: Refigured Painting – The German Image, Solomon R. Guggenheim Museum, New York
- 1985: 1945-1985 Kunst in der Bundesrepublik Deutschland, Nationalgalerie Berlin
- 1983-85: Sculpture from Germany (Organized by Independent Curators Inc.), San Francisco Museum of Modern Art; Sarah Campbell Blaffer Gallery, University of Houston; The Winnipeg Art Gallery; Art Gallery of Hamilton, Ontario; Archer M. Huntington Gallery, University of Texas, Austin; Queens Museum, New York
- 1982: documenta 7, Kassel
- 1982: Halle 6, Kampnagel-Fabrik Hamburg
- 1977: documenta 6, Kassel
- 1972: documenta 5, Kassel
- 1970: Jetzt, Josef-Haubrich-Kunsthalle, Cologne
- 1969: When Attitudes Become Form: Live in Your Head, Kunsthalle Bern; Museum Haus Lange, Krefeld; Institute of Contemporary Arts, London

== Selected collections ==
- Kunstmuseum Bern
- FRAC - Pays de la Loire, Carquefou
- FRAC - Nord-Pas de Calais, Dunkerque
- Stiftung Museum Kunstpalast, Düsseldorf
- Städtische Galerie Erlangen
- S.M.A.K.- Stedelijk Museum voor Actuele Kunst, Ghent
- Museum Morsbroich Leverkusen
- Tate Britain, London
- Kunstmuseum Luzern
- Museum of Modern Art, New York
- Centre Georges Pompidou, Paris
- Museum der Stadt Ratingen
- Musée d’Art Moderne de Saint-Etienne
- FRAC - Rhône-Alpes, IAC - Institut d’Art Contemporain, Villeurbanne

== Selected bibliography ==
- Michael Buthe und Ingvild Goetz. ex. cat. with text by Ingvild Goetz, Udo Kier, Jürgen Klauke, Karsten Löckemann, Dominikus Müller, Marcel Odenbach, Ulrike Rosenbach, Antje von Graevenitz, Stephan von Wiese. Munich: Hatje Cantz and Sammlung Goetz, 2016 ISBN 978-3775742245
- Michael Buthe Retrospective, ex. cat. with text by Fanni Fetzer, Philippe Van Cauteren, Okwui Enwezor, Martin Germann, Dominik Müller, Heinz Stahlhut, and Ulrich Wilmes. Kunstmuseum Luzern, S.M.A.K. Gent, Haus Der Kunst, Munich: Hatje Cantz Verlag, 2015 ISBN 9783775740388
- Franke, Marietta. Der Absurde Blick. Pieterlen: Peter Lang, 2010 ISBN 978-3631612781
- Müller, Karsten. Michael Buthe: Der Engel und sein Schatten, ex. cat. Bielefeld: Kerber Verlag, 2009 ISBN 9783866782426
- Buthe: Michel de la Sainte Beauté, ex. cat. with text by Paolo Bianchi, Barbara Catoir, Sylvia Martin, Johannes Meinhardt, and Stephan von Wiese. Düsseldorf: Kunstmuseum Düsseldorf, 1999 ISBN 978-3829570145
