= Bruce Charlesworth =

American artist

- Born: 1950 (age 75–76); Davenport, Iowa, U.S.
- Education: University of Northern Iowa (BA, 1972); University of Iowa (MFA, 1975)
- Known for: Photography, Video, Installation
- Notable work: Eddie Glove (1976–79); Surveillance (1981); Private Enemy, Public Eye (1990s); Love Disorder (2008)
- Website: https://www.brucecharlesworth.net/

Bruce Charlesworth (born 1950) is an American artist, known primarily for his highly stylized and constructed photographic, video and multimedia works.

== Early life and education ==
Charlesworth was born in 1950 in Davenport, Iowa. He received his BA degree in Art from the University of Northern Iowa (1972) and his MFA degree in Painting from the University of Iowa in 1975.

== Work ==
=== Style and themes ===
Charlesworth is known for manipulating lighting, color, form, space, and sound to create large scale, stylized environments which he refers to as “narrative environments”. The narrative environments act as the backdrop for his video, photography, and interactive pieces. Charlesworth’s work is staged and constructed. Objects and set pieces are stripped down to their most basic form and intense colors, patterns, and lighting work together with performers to create narrative tension and absurd humor.

Themes in his work include contemporary living, media, surveillance, and conditioning. When talking about his work and process to the Rose Gallery, Charlesworth says this:

"I’ve always embraced the potential for thematic crossover between multiple media. For most of my projects, I develop a conceptual framework before adding concrete details. Although my finished works often contain characters, dialogue, emotions and narrative, I always start in an abstract place. An idea may begin as a shape, color relationship or directional lines. The architecture will often come next, with characters and stories evolving out of a sense of place. My themes include lighting and color as visual disruptions, layers created by barriers and screens, extremes of distance and contrasts of vastness with confined space. The anthropomorphic potential of inanimate objects is another recurring theme in my work."

=== Notable work ===
Charlesworth began to exhibit in New York and internationally with the photo-novellas Eddie Glove (1976–79), and Special Communiqués (1981). Other staged photographic series followed, including Trouble (1982–83), Fate (1984–87), Man and Nature (1988–91), Confiscated Objects (1999–2000), and Serum (2003–08).

Surveillance (1981) was the first of many of what Charlesworth termed narrative environments, works that use video and/or audio to power a narrative within a designed space. Projectile (1982), Wrong Adventures (1984), Private House (1987), Reality Street (1994) and Airlock (2004) are a few subsequent multimedia installations.

Video and film works include Communiqués for Tape (1981), Robert and Roger (1985), Dateline for Danger (1987), A Stranger's Index (1990) and The Happiness Effect (2004). Throughout much of the 1990s Charlesworth worked on his feature-length experimental film project Private Enemy - Public Eye. In the book entitled, Private Enemy, Public Eye: The Work of Bruce Charlesworth (1989), was also the name of a survey exhibition of his work at the International Center of Photography. The interactive video installation Love Disorder was featured in the Zero1 Biennial (2008) in San Jose, California and in the Madison Museum of Contemporary Art's Wisconsin Triennial (2010). Love Disorder featured a 12 foot tall screen with an uncomfortably close view of a face, and sensors in the room would change how the face reacts to the viewers movements.

== Exhibitions and collections ==
=== Selected exhibitions ===
- American Film Institute, Los Angeles, California, USA
- C/O Berlin, Berlin, Germany
- Centre Georges Pompidou, Paris, France
- The Photographers' Gallery, "Bruce Charlesworth: Stranger's Index", London, England (1989-1990)
- MIT Museum, Cambridge, Massachusetts, USA (2019)
- McCord Stewart Museum, Montreal, Quebec, Canada (2019)
- Musée National d'Art Moderne, Paris, France
- Museum of Contemporary Art Chicago, Chicago, Illinois, USA
- National Museum of American Art, Washington, D.C, USA
- New Museum, "Persona", New York City, New York, USA (1981)
- Palazzo Magnani, Reggio Emilia, Italy (2020 – 2021)
- ROSEGALLERY, Santa Monica, "Fate" California, USA (2022 – 2023)
- Tate Gallery, London, England
- Whitney Biennial, Whitney Museum, "Surveillance", New York City, New York, USA (1983)

=== Permanent collection ===
- Fundação de Serraives, Porto, Portugal
- Metropolitan Museum of Art, "Untitled", New York City, New York, USA
- Minneapolis Institute of Art, "Untitiled [red car]", Minneapolis, Minnesota, USA
- Museum of Fine Arts, Houston, Houston, Texas, USA
- Walker Art Center, Minneapolis, Minnesota, USA

== Awards and honors ==
=== Fellowships ===
- Bush Artist Fellowship, Bush Foundation (1981, 1989, 2000)
- Jerome Fellowship, Jerome Foundation (1981/1982)
- Fellowship, National Endowment for the Arts (1987)
- McKnight Artist Fellowship, McKnight Foundation (1993/1994)
- Guggenheim Fellowship, John Simon Guggenheim Memorial Foundation (2007)
- Todi Circle Fellow, Foundation for the Exhibition of Photography

=== Artist in residence ===
- Capp Street Project (1984)

== Sources ==
- Charlesworth, Bruce (1989). Private Enemy Public Eye: The Work of Bruce Charlesworth. New York: Aperture Book. ISBN 0-89381-337-0. OCLC 317910715.
