= Celia Álvarez Muñoz =

American artist (born 1937)

- Born: Celia Limón Álvarez; 1937 (age 88–89); El Paso, Texas, U.S.
- Education: North Texas State University (MFA)
- Known for: Photography, conceptual art, mixed media art

Celia Álvarez Muñoz (née Celia Limón Álvarez; born 1937) is an American Chicana mixed-media conceptual artist and photographer, based in Arlington, Texas.

== Early life and education ==
Álvarez Muñoz was born in El Paso, Texas, to Enriqueta Limón Alvarez and Francisco Pompa Alvarez. She grew up in the Chihuahuita historical neighborhood of El Paso. Prior to becoming an artist, Álvarez Muñoz worked as a fashion illustrator and an elementary school art educator. She decided to commit to creating art in the 1970s, by 1977 she enrolled in graduate school to study art. She earned a Masters of Fine Arts at North Texas State University in Denton, Texas.

== Work ==
Drawing on her experiences living near the US-Mexico border, Álvarez Muñoz's work addresses the tension between linguistic, cultural, and political worlds. She often incorporates themes of family and "communal memories" in her work. She uses text and images in her work to explore the ambiguous signs and signifiers where cultures meet, and to communicate stories of American history, culture, and society. She has exhibited her work in museums and galleries in the U.S. and abroad, and is included in the collection of the Museum of New Mexico.

Her work has been written about by art historians, Lucy Lippard, Benito Huerta, and others. In Roberto Tejada's monograph on Muñoz, he includes a teaching guide (Vol. 3) using principles from her work in the teaching of multicultural art, and border issues.

In 2024, her work is included in Xican-a.o.x. Body a comprehensive group exhibition expanding on the Chicano experience and artistic practice as part of major art historical movements. The show included works from 1960s to the present and traveled from the Cheech Marin Center for Chicano Art & Culture at Riverside Art Museum, California, to the Pérez Art Museum Miami, Florida. The show was curated by Cecilia Fajardo-Hill, Marissa Del Toro, and Gilbert Vicario with accompanying catalog by The Chicago University Press.

More recently, Álvarez Muñoz's artistic production appears, following an invitation by María Beatriz H. Carrión, in El Límite at the Amon Carter Museum of American Art in Fort Worth, Texas, where she "explores the railroad and its role in the connection and division of countries, traditions, cultures, and languages."

== Exhibitions ==
=== Solo exhibitions ===
- 1988 – The Lannan Museum, Lake Worth, Florida
- 1989 – New Langton Arts, San Francisco
- 1989 – Bridge Center for Contemporary Art, El Paso, Texas
- 1994 – "A Brand New Ball Game", Capp Street Project, San Francisco
- 1991 – "Concentrations 26: Celia Alvarez Munoz, Abriendo Tierra/Breaking Ground", Dallas Museum of Art
- 2026 – El Límite, Amon Carter Museum of American Art, Fort Worth, TX

=== Group exhibitions ===
Álvarez Muñoz has exhibited at;

- 1991 – Whitney Biennial of American Art, New York City
- 1992 – Museum of Contemporary Art San Diego
- 2002 – Stories Your Mother Never Told You (traveling retrospective), Blue Star ArtSpace, El Paso Museum of Art, and Mexic-Arte Museum
- 2006–2007 – Frontera 450+, Station Museum of Contemporary Art, Houston, Texas
- 2009 – Chicana Badgirls: Las Hociconas, 516 ARTS, Albuquerque, New Mexico
- 2009 – Rastros y Crónicas: Mujerez de Juarez, National Museum of Mexican Art, Chicago, Illinois
- 2012 – Artifactual Realities, Station Museum of Contemporary Art, Houston, Texas
- 2014 – Unbound: Contemporary Art After Frida Kahlo, Museum of Contemporary Art, Chicago (MCA)
- 2024 – Xican-a.o.x. Body, Pérez Art Museum Miami, Florida
