= Shahzia Sikander =

Pakistani-American artist (born 1969)

- Born: 1969 (age 56–57); Lahore, Pakistan
- Education: National College of Arts Lahore, Rhode Island School of Design
- Known for: Visual art, Contemporary art
- Awards: MacArthur Fellowship
- Website: shahziasikander.com

Shahzia Sikander (born 1969) is a Pakistani-American visual artist. Sikander works across a variety of mediums, including drawing, painting, printmaking, animation, installation, performance and video. Sikander currently lives and works in New York City.

== Education ==
Sikander studied at the National College of Arts Lahore in Pakistan, where she was taught the traditional discipline of Indo-Persian miniature painting. She earned a Bachelor of Fine Arts in 1991. Sikander moved to the United States and attended the Rhode Island School of Design (RISD), earning a Master of Fine Arts in Painting and Printmaking in 1995.

== Early work ==
Initially I explored the tension between illustration and fine art when I first encountered miniature painting in my late teens. Championing the formal aspects of the Indo-Persian miniature-painting genre has often been at the core of my practice.

— Shahzia Sikander,

As an undergraduate student in Lahore, Sikander studied the techniques of Persian and Mughal Indo-Persian manuscript painting, often integrating traditional forms of Mughal (Islamic) and Rajput (Hindu) styles and culture.

The Scroll, 1992, is a semi-autobiographical manuscript painting. The Scroll Sikander's thesis project at the National College of Arts, includes formal elements of historical manuscript painting. The Scroll portrays scenes of everyday contemporary Pakistani life, including rituals that explore cultural and geographic traditions. Many hues, patterns and incidents appear in The Scroll. The use of perspective is increasingly noticeable, exhibiting a linear movement of composition. Common concerns of economics, imperialism, colonialism, sexualism and identity are also apparent in Sikander's early paintings. The Scroll launched what has come to be called the neo-miniature.

Earlier paintings also include elements of Gopi, or the cowherd female devotees and lovers of the deity Krishna in Hindu mythology, while figures of men are depicted as "turbaned warriors." The Gopi is portrayed in Sikander's early miniature paintings to "locate visual and symbolic forms within miniature painting that have the potential to generate multiple meanings." Shahzia Sikander's most significant use of Gopi can be seen in a series of drawings and digital animation from 2003, titled Spinn.

== Performance art and installations ==
I think context, location matters a lot. Because location obviously in my situation, it's the space in which the work is going to be exhibited. And since some of the work I do is created onsite, it requires a different type of space, versus the smaller drawings or more subject-oriented work. So that the context becomes important.

— Shahzia Sikander,

The veil (a scarf often worn by Muslim women) covers the hair and neck and is symbolic of both religion and womanhood. Sikander's miniature paintings often refer to the veil, exploring her own religious history and cultural identity. In a performance piece, Sikander wore an elaborate lace veil for several weeks while documenting the reaction of her peers. Sikander explains that the veil gave her an ultimate sense of security, stating that, "It was wonderful to not have people see my facial or body language, and at the same time be in control and know that they did not know I was acting, and checking their reaction."

Imagery of the traditional Muslim veil occur throughout Sikander's compositions. Her larger works are reminiscent of a centuries-old Indian practice in which women regularly paint figures all over the walls and floors of their houses, using "whole body" gestural movements. Sikander uses large drawings as the basis for her large-scale installations, often requiring months to complete. Nemesis, a site-specific installation at the Frances Young Tang Teaching Museum and Art Gallery, features a jewel-like paintings as small as six by eight inches and two animations. Sikander was commissioned to create two large public art pieces for Princeton University, which were revealed in 2017. One is Quintuplet Effect, a painting on layered glass which can be seen in the Julis Romo Rabinowitz Building. The other is Ecstasy as Sublime, Heart as Vector, a sixty-six-foot-tall mosaic in the Louis A. Simpson International Building.

Sikander places a strong emphasis on feminist messaging in her artwork, often using it as an avenue to initiate discussions surrounding religion and politics. As a Muslim woman living in New York in the midst of the aftermath of 9/11, Sikander made note of the growing interest in Middle Eastern women and islam in the west through her art. In Pleasure Pillars, Sikander makes a clear reference to the destruction of the twin towers in 2001 as the women in the painting are depicted shooting beams and creating explosions. Throughout her portfolio, she depicts women with incomplete bodies and mythological features, such as horns. This can also be seen in her mural, The Perennial Gaze, in which the woman is embraced by a gold, androgynous, headless body. Sikander utilizes the human body to push the boundaries between what is praised as masculine and feminine, highlighting the sensual qualities of the female form and how it is often overshadowed.

In 2023, Sikander was commissioned to create a statue for Madison Square in New York. In this installation, a statue of a golden armless floating woman with ram horns is held up by a skirt covered in a mosaic. This installation, “Havah ... .to breathe air, life,” received a mixture of praise and criticism from viewers as the United States continues to be in a legislative battle on women’s reproductive rights, specifically abortion rights. This sculpture is interpreted to be in conversation to female reproductive rights from the title. Havah has two meanings, in Urdu it translates to air or Eve. Coupled with the allusions of the woman’s body connected to nature, many viewers interpret the sculpture in relation to female reproduction as the female body is understood as the vessel of human life. In an interview Sikander refers to Eve as “the first law breaker,” though she shares no clear political affiliation or opinions on the topic in particular. Rather, Sikander created the sculpture to start a conversation and have the meaning reveal itself, as she explains she “thrive[es] on hearing what happens over time.” The sculpture, Witness, was later relocated to the University of Houston, where it drew criticism from the anti-abortion Christian group Texas Right to Life. Sikander stated that viewers may have "misread the symbolism behind her artwork, which includes hornlike braids, tentacle arms and a lace collar. Her intention was not specifically to comment on abortion or Supreme Court justices, but rather to create a broader message about a woman’s power in the justice system". In July 2024, the sculpture was vandalized and beheaded.

== Exhibitions ==
=== Solo exhibitions ===
Select solo exhibitions
Year	Name	Location	Type	Notes
1993		Pakistan Embassy, Washington, D.C., United States	Government gallery	
1996	Art Celebration 96: Shahzia Sikander	Barbara Davis Gallery, Houston, Texas, United States	Gallery	
1996	Knock Knock Who's There? Mithilia, Mithilia Who?	Project Row Houses, Houston, Texas, United States	Non-profit gallery	
1997	A Kind of Slight and Pleasing Dislocation	Hosfelt Gallery, San Francisco, California, United States	Gallery	
1997	Murals and Miniatures	Deitch Projects, New York, New York, United States	Gallery	
1998	Shahzia Sikander: Drawings and Miniatures	Kemper Museum of Contemporary Art, Kansas City, Missouri, United States	Museum	
1998	Shahzia Sikander	The Renaissance Society at the University of Chicago, Chicago, Illinois, United States	College gallery	
1999	Directions: Shahzia Sikander	Hirshhorn Museum and Sculpture Garden, Washington, D.C., United States	Museum	
2000	Shahzia Sikander: Acts of Balance	Whitney Museum of American Art at Philip Morris, New York, New York, United States	Museum	
2001	Intimacy	ArtPace, San Antonio, Texas, United States	Non-profit gallery	
2003	SpiNN	Brent Sikkema, New York, New York, United States	Gallery	
2003	Drawing to Drawing	Hosfelt Gallery, San Francisco, California, United States	Gallery	
2004	Contemporary Links: Shahzia Sikander	San Diego Museum of Art, San Diego, California, United States	Museum	
2004	Shahzia Sikander: Flip Flop	San Diego Museum of Art, San Diego, California, United States	Museum	This was a three-part installation.
2004–2005	Shahzia Sikander: Nemesis	Aldrich Contemporary Art Museum, Ridgefield, Connecticut, United States	Museum	organized by Ian Berry and Jessica Hough
2004	Shahzia Sikander: Nemesis	The Frances Young Tang Teaching Museum and Art Gallery at Skidmore College, Saratoga Springs, New York, United States	Museum	
2005–2006	Shahzia Sikander: Nemesis	Pérez Art Museum Miami (PAMM), Miami, Florida, United States	Museum	
2005	Dissonance to Detour	Otis College of Art and Design, Los Angeles, California, United States	College gallery	
2005	51 Ways of Looking	Brent Sikkema New York, New York, United States	Gallery	
2005	Shahzia Sikander: New Work	Sikkema Jenkins & Co. New York, New York, United States	Gallery	
2006	Shahzia Sikander: Solo Exhibition	The Fabric Workshop and Museum, Philadelphia, Pennsylvania, United States	Museum	
2007	Shahzia Sikander	Irish Museum of Modern Art (IMMA), Dublin, Ireland	Museum	
2007–2008	Shahzia Sikander	Museum of Contemporary Art, Sydney (MCA), Australia	Museum	
2008	Intimate Ambivalence	IKON Gallery, Birmingham, United Kingdom	Gallery	
2009	Stalemate	Sikkema Jenkins & Co. New York, New York, United States	Gallery	
2009	Shahzia Sikander Selects: Works from the Permanent Collection	Cooper-Hewitt, National Design Museum. New York, New York, United States	Museum	
2009	Shahzia Sikander: 'I am also not my own enemy'	Pilar Corrias, London, United Kingdom	Gallery	
2011	Shahzia Sikander: The Exploding Company Man and Other Abstractions	Walter and McBean Galleries, San Francisco Art Institute, San Francisco, California, United States	College gallery	Curated by Hou Hanru
2011	Shahzia Sikander: The Exploding Company Man and Other Abstractions	Bakalar & Paine Galleries, MassArt, Boston, Massachusetts, United States	College gallery	Curated by Hou Hanru
2014	Shahzia Sikander: Parallax	Bildmuseet, Umeå University, Umea, Sweden	College gallery	"Shahzia Sikander: Parallax" was first shown at this location, a multichannel video animation with original score.
2015	Shahzia Sikander: Parallax	Guggenheim Museum Bilbao, Spain	Museum	a multichannel video animation with original score
2016	Shahzia Sikander: Ecstasy As Sublime, Heart As Vector	MAXXI, Rome, Italy	Museum	
2021	Shahzia Sikander: Extraordinary Realities	Morgan Library & Museum, New York, United States	Museum	
2021-2022	Shahzia Sikander: Unbound	Jesus College West Court Gallery, Cambridge, United Kingdom	Museum	

=== Group exhibitions ===
Select group exhibitions
Year	Name	Location	Type	Notes
1994	A Selection of Contemporary Paintings from Pakistan	Pacific Asia Museum, Pasadena, California, United States	Museum	
2002	time/frame	Jack S. Blanton Museum of Art, University of Texas at Austin, Austin, Texas, United States	College museum	
2002	Drawing Now: Eight Propositions	Museum of Modern Art, Queens, New York, United States	Museum	
2005	Fatal Love: South Asian American Art Now	Queens Museum of Art, Queens, New York, United States	Museum	
2006	Dirty Yoga: The Fifth Taipei Biennial	Taipei Biennial, Taipei, Taiwan	Biennial	
2007	Global Feminisms	Elizabeth A. Sackler Center for Feminist Art, Brooklyn Museum, Brooklyn, New York, United States	College museum	Feminist art work from 1990 and onward, created in various art media including sculpture, painting, drawing, photography, video, installation, and performance.
2007	Global Feminisms	Davis Museum and Cultural Center, Wellesley College, Wellesley, Massachusetts, United States	College Museum	
2007	Not For Sale	MoMA PS1, Long Island City, New York, United States	Museum	
2008	Order. Desire. Light: An Exhibition of Contemporary Drawings	Irish Museum of Modern Art (IMMA), Dublin, Ireland	Museum	
2009	Compass in Hand: Selections from the Judith Rothschild Foundation Contemporary Drawings Collection,	Museum of Modern Art (MOMA), New York, New York, United States	Museum	
2009	Moving Perspectives: Shahzia Sikander and Sun Xun	Sackler Gallery, The Smithsonian, Washington D.C., United States	Museum	

== Awards and fellowships ==
- 1995-1997- Core Fellowship, Glassel School of Art, Museum of Fine Arts, Houston
- 1997- The Louis Comfort Tiffany Foundation Award
- 1998- The Joan Mitchell Award
- 1999- South Asian Women's Creative Collective Achievement Award
- 2003- Commendation Award, Mayor's Office, City of New York
- 2005- Jennifer Howard Coleman Distinguished Lectureship and Residency
- 2005- Tamgha-e-imtiaz, National Medal of Honor, Government of Pakistan
- 2006- John D. and Catherine T. MacArthur Foundation Fellowship
- 2006- Young Global Leader, World Economic Forum
- 2008- Performing and Visual Arts Achiever of the Year award presented by the South Asian Excellence Awards, 2008
- 2009- Rockefeller Foundation Bellagio Center Creative Arts Fellowship
- 2012- U.S. Department of State Medal of Arts, Art in Embassies (AIE), United States State Department
- 2022- Fukuoka Prize Arts and Culture Prize
