= Stefan Kürten =

German artist

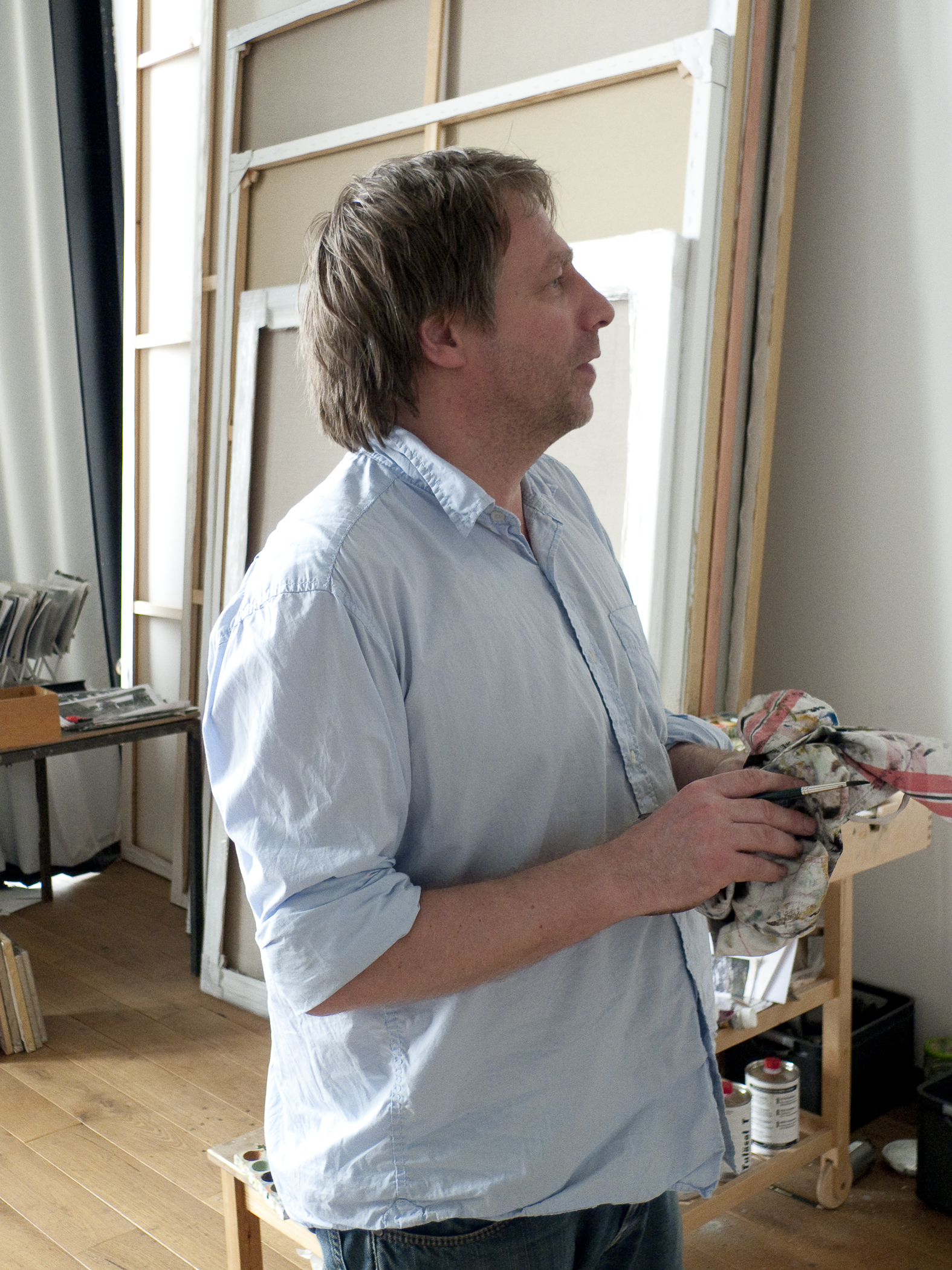
- Kürten in 2010
- Born: 1963 (age 62–63); Düsseldorf, Germany
- Education: Heinrich Heine University Düsseldorf, Kunstakademie Düsseldorf
- Website: www.stefankuerten.de

Stefan Kürten (born 1963) is a contemporary German artist who lives and works in Düsseldorf. Known for his intricate paintings of domestic and urban landscapes, Kürten has exhibited extensively since 1984 and his work is held in a number of collections in Europe and the United States.

== Life and career ==
Stefan Kürten was born in 1963 in Düsseldorf. After studying Philosophy and English at Heinrich Heine University, he enrolled at Kunstakademie Düsseldorf and studied painting with Michael Buthe, receiving his MA in 1989. He then moved to San Francisco, where he studied and taught at the San Francisco Art Institute during the early 1990s. Kürten has since taught at various institutions, such as Hochschule für Künste, Bremen (from 2002 to 2003), Bauhaus-Universität Weimar (2010), School of Art and Design, Alfred University (2012), and Kunstakademie Düsseldorf (since 2014).

Kürten's paintings depict natural and built environments or interiors while often incorporating decorative or ornamental motifs culled from wallpaper and textile design. Devoid of any human presence, Kürten's work typically showcases spaces and buildings marked by daily life and use but seemingly abandoned or vacated, in many cases allowing plants and natural life to encroach and overtake the space. However, he rejects a strictly futuristic or prophetic reading of his work; in a conversation with Lawrence R. Rinder, director of BAM/PFA, he speaks to the hauntological nature of his paintings: "It is more concerned with the present, the way we feel and experience ourselves and our environments now, and of course the past, as we access our memories be they 'true' or 'false.' The futuristic quality in my images is something from the future, but it's a future from the past, an optimism laden with bright promises and bedeviled by moral imperatives."

Alongside his career in painting, Kürten also makes music under his own name and with the band Elena Farr, and played guitar in the group Superbilk from 1995 to 1999.

== Selected exhibitions ==
=== Selected solo exhibitions ===
- 2017: Through the mirror, NextLevel Galerie, Paris
- 2014-15: Heimlich, Galerie der Stadt Backnang, Backnang, Germany
- 2012-13: Come on home-Arbeiten auf Papier, Kunstmuseum Mülheim an der Ruhr
- 2010: Darker with the Day, Parkhaus im Malkasten, Düsseldorf
- 2008: Always, Künstlerverein Malkasten, Düsseldorf
- 2007: Shadowtime, Museum Haus Esters, Krefeld; Royal Hibernian Academy, Dublin
- 2005: Say Hello, Wave Goodbye, Thomas Dane, Ltd., London
- 2003: The Nearest Thing to Heaven, Museum im Kulturspeicher Würzburg
- 2002: Perfect Day, Alexander and Bonin, New York
- 2001: In einem anderen Land, an einem anderen Ort, Galerie Michael Cosar, Düsseldorf
- 1998: Die Lüge der Erinnerung/The Lie of Memory, Hosfelt Gallery, San Francisco
- 1998: Different Worlds, Goethe-Institut, Hong Kong
- 1996: Aus Wiedersehen Bielefeld, Galerie Raab, Berlin
- 1993: Das ABC des Lebens, Kulturforum Alte Post, Neuss, Germany
- 1993: Dietmar Werle, Cologne
- 1993: Life Cycles, Artspace, San Francisco
- 1991: The Diversity of Life, Dorothy Goldeen Gallery, Los Angeles
- 1991: Aschenbach Galerie, Amsterdam
- 1990: One Thousand and One Mornings, Rena Bransten Gallery, San Francisco
- 1989: Matrix 131: Stefan Kürten, Berkeley Art Museum, Berkeley, CA
- 1988: Galerie Ute Parduhn, Düsseldorf
- 1984: Fun Gallery, San Francisco

=== Selected group exhibitions ===
- 2016-17: The Adventure of our Collection I, Kaiser Wilhelm Museum, Krefeld
- 2013: La Peintre de la Vie Moderne, Galerie Jochen Hempel, Leipzig, Germany
- 2011-12: Gesamtkunstwerk, New Art From Germany, Saatchi Gallery, London
- 2010: Optical Shift – Illusion und Täuschung / Illusion and Deception, B-05 Kunst und Kulturzentrum, Montabaur
- 2010: Collecting the New, Irish Museum of Modern Art, Dublin
- 2007-08: Garten Eden: Der Garten in der Kunst seit 1900, Kunsthalle Emden
- 2007: Early Retirement, Mai 36 Galerie, Zürich
- 2007: Die Kunst zu sammeln, Museum Kunstpalast, Düsseldorf
- 2005: Le peintre de la vie moderne/De schilder van het moderene leven/The Painter of Modern Life, Museum De Paviljoens, Almere, Netherlands
- 2004: Come back in one piece, Galerie Anna Klinkhammer, Düsseldorf
- 2000: Of the Moment, San Francisco Museum of Modern Art
- 2000: Extraordinary Reality, Columbus Museum of Art, OH
- 1995: New Acquisitions, Berkeley Art Museum and Pacific Film Archive, Berkeley, CA
- 1994: On Paper, The Drawing Room, Amsterdam
- 1985: Perspektiven 3, Kunstverein Düsseldorf

== Selected collections ==
- Berkeley Art Museum and Pacific Film Archive, Berkeley, CA
- Birmingham Museum of Art, AL
- The Irish Museum of Modern Art, Dublin
- Artothek, Wilhelm-Lehmbruck-Museum, Duisburg
- Stiftung Museum Kunst Palast, Düsseldorf
- Kunsthalle in Emden
- Herbert F. Johnson Museum of Art, Cornell University, Ithaca, NY
- Knoxville Museum of Art, TN
- Kunstmuseen Krefeld
- Los Angeles County Museum of Art, Los Angeles
- Montreal Museum of Fine Arts
- Kunstmuseum Mülheim an der Ruhr
- Clemens Sels Museum, Neuss
- Museum of Modern Art, New York
- New York Public Library, New York
- San Francisco Museum of Modern Art

== Selected bibliography ==
- Shick, Martin and Simone Scholten, Eds. Running to Stand Still: Stefan Kürten. ex cat. Stadt Backnang: VG Bild-Kunst, Bonn, 2015 ISBN 9783981358964
- Zybok, Oliver, ed. Here Comes the Night. Works on Paper 2009–2013, ex. cat. Ostfildern: Hatje Cantz, 2013 ISBN 978-3-7757-3735-7
- Hentschel, Martin. Stefan Kürten, Black Mirror, Drucke/Prints 1991-2009; Bielefeld, Kerber Verlag, 2010 ISBN 978-3866784000
- Thomas, Elizabeth. Matrix / Berkeley, A changing exhibition of Contemporary Art. University of California. Berkeley Art Museum and Pacific Film Archive ISBN 978-0971939783
- Hentschel, Martin, Ed. Shadowtime, ex. cat. Krefeld: Kunstmuseum Krefeld; Dublin: Royal Hibernian Academy; Bielefeld: Kerber Verlag, 2007 ISBN 978-3866780590
- Kürten, Stefan and Rebecca Solnit. Inside Out. San Francisco: Artspace Books, 2006 ISBN 978-1891273063
- Frankel, David and David Gray. Stefan Kürten: Blue days, black nights. New York: Alexander and Bonin; San Francisco: Hosfelt Gallery; Düsseldorf: Galerie Michael Cosar, Galerie Ute Parduhn, 2004
- Reese, Beate. Stefan Kürten (translated by Julia Thorson). Würzburg: Museum in Kulturspeicher, 2003
- McCormick, Carlo, Jens-Peter Koerver, Lawrence Rinder. Stefan Kürten: Every day is like Sunday. Düsseldorf: Galerie Michael Cosar, Galerie Ute Parduhn; San Francisco: Todd Hosfelt Gallery, 2001
