= Nicole Phungrasamee Fein =

American artist

- Born: Nicole Lynne Phungrasamee; 1974 (age 51–52); Evanston, Illinois, U.S.
- Education: Tufts University; School of the Museum of Fine Arts, Boston; Mills College
- Known for: Drawing, sculpture
- Spouse: Mark Fein
- Children: Felix Fein
- Website: Nicole Phungrasamee Fein

Nicole Phungrasamee Fein (born 1974) is an American abstract artist based in San Francisco, California. She is known for meticulous, process-oriented watercolor drawings consisting of innumerable lines, dots or washes of color, often arranged in grid or radial patterns. Critics frequently describe the drawings as elegant, serene and ethereal, noting a contrast between Fein's painstaking methods and the visual and emotional impact of the work. Artforum critic Elliott Zooey Martin wrote, "Like Agnes Martin, Fein is interested in the meditative calm afforded by a serial process … While the prescriptive nature of her mark-making system may seem rationalized or detached, the drawings are acutely alive. It is this tension—between the predetermined rigor of Fein’s system and the sheer beauty of the outcome—that makes these pieces so fascinating."

Fein has exhibited at institutions including the San Francisco Museum of Modern Art; Museum of Fine Arts, Houston; Berkeley Art Museum; and San Jose Museum of Art. Her work is held in the collections of those four museums, as well as at the Whitney Museum, Hammer Museum and Brooklyn Museum, among others.

== Education and exhibitions ==
Nicole Phungrasamee Fein was born in Evanston, Illinois in 1974 and grew up in Santa Barbara, California. She completed a BA at Tufts University and a BFA at the School of the Museum of Fine Arts, Boston, before earning an MFA from Mills College in Oakland, California. As an undergraduate, she spent a summer at the China Academy of Art in Hangzhou immersing herself in traditional Chinese ink techniques and calligraphy, an experience that led her to adopt watercolor as a lifelong medium.

Fein has had solo exhibitions at Nancy Hoffman Gallery and Danese Corey in New York, Hosfelt Gallery (San Francisco), Devin Borden Gallery (Houston), and Gallery Joe (Philadelphia), among others. In addition to aforementioned museums, she has exhibited at the de Young Museum, Kemper Art Museum, Contemporary Jewish Museum and Katonah Museum of Art.

Nicole Phungrasamee Fein, 1060112, watercolor on paper, 14" x 14", 2012.

== Work and reception ==
Fein's art typically centers on small, focused watercolor drawings that use carefully brushed horizontal lines, weave-like overlapping strokes, patterns of dots or water-borne granulating pigment. Although abstract and minimal, the drawings find inspiration in natural phenomena, such as sunsets, the blurred meeting of sea and sky, and weather events (e.g., 1060112, 2012). Reviewers characterize her drawings as precise and methodical, and on the other hand, delicate, translucent and animate. According to San Francisco Chronicle critic Kenneth Baker, Fein's work "has the vibrancy that only sustained, disciplined labor generates … [Her] art is calmative. The rare viewers, or collectors, who bring to looking at it anything like the devotion inscribed in it will feel their heart rates slowing."

Fein's work emphasizes process, privileging the creative act and the patient recording of accumulated, spontaneous responses to the present moment rather than predetermination or willful expression. She creates her drawings through a labor-intensive, step-by-step application of strokes or dots. Her systematic approach extends beyond individual works to entire bodies of work. She creates sequentially, in series, with each drawing following logically from the previous one; this fact is reflected in titles that incorporate dates and sequence numbers. Critics contend that a key point of interest in Fein's work lies in the tension between the rigor, self-imposed limits and simplicity of her mark-making method and the beauty and diversity of its unexpected effects.

Nicole Phungrasamee Fein, Sabbath Basket, paper, 5" x 10" x 10", 2017.

=== Bodies of work ===
Since the early 2000s, Fein has produced abstract watercolor drawings and delicate paper sculptures. The drawings consisted of obsessively layered, freehand-drawn lines forming bright, near-perfect stripes, grids and plaids, which critics likened to tightly woven baskets. A similar aesthetic and process animates the sculptures, some made from painstakingly hand-cut and woven strips of paper (e.g., Sabbath Basket, 2017). Described by Victoria Dalkey as "imbued with a fragile poetry," they achieved a wide range in texture, tone and mass using simple forms—dome, cube, nest, or in the case of One by One (2003), a single, vertiginous stack of confetti.

In subsequent years, Fein focused on drawing, employing a palette that expanded and narrowed; a 2006 solo show presented line and grid works in "ice cream"-like colors, while the 2009 show "Shift" featured wider, more physically present bands in soft grays and tans. Philadelphia critic Edith Newhall related this work to Jasper Johns and Agnes Martin, noting, "Fein's refined compositions offer an unusual combination of the otherworldly and a resolute plainness." In the 2012 solo exhibitions "where" and "Forgotten," Fein turned to vibrant, spectrum-like arrangements of colors ranging from sunset hues to pink to phosphorescent green. Reviewers described the small, slightly imprecise squares of overlapping washes in active terms, as pulsating and flickering fields that seemed to expand and contract like breathing (e.g., 1060112, 2012).

Nicole Phungrasamee Fein, io13, iron oxide on illustration board, 8" x 8", 2015.

In the "Tondi" (2014–15) series, Fein turned to a circular format, producing apparently solid round forms and gradations that, upon close inspection, were revealed to be countless radiating strokes of thin watercolor lines.

The exhibitions "Alluvial" (2020), "Joy Fields" (2021) and "Drops from the Rainbow" (2024) marked a significant shift in Fein's approach from the brush to water flow as a guiding principle and carrier of veils of color (e.g., io13, 2015). Created in circular and square formats, these atmospheric works exploited the many behaviors of water, using visual equivalents of drizzle, sedimentation, pooling, fog, and rivulets, as well as radial forms that evoke nature on micro and macro scales (molecules, cells, eclipses, exploding stars). Less controlled than her brushed drawings, the series nonetheless retained Fein's sequential methodology, while yielding a characteristic sense of delicacy and tranquility according to reviews.

== Collections ==
Fein's art was first collected by Sally and Wynn Kramarsky. Her work belongs to the collections of the Berkeley Art Museum; Birmingham Museum of Art; Blanton Museum of Art; Brooklyn Museum; Fine Arts Museums of San Francisco; Fogg Museum; Hammer Museum; Honolulu Museum of Art Spalding House; Krannert Art Museum; McNay Art Museum; Museum of Fine Arts, Houston; New Mexico Museum of Art; Pennsylvania Academy of Fine Arts; San Francisco Museum of Modern Art; San Jose Museum of Art; and Whitney Museum; among others.
