= David Ireland (artist) =

American artist (1930–2009)

- Born: David Kenneth Ireland, Jr. August 25, 1930; Bellingham, Washington, U.S.
- Died: May 17, 2009 (aged 78); San Francisco, California, U.S.
- Education: Western Washington University, California College of Arts and Crafts, San Francisco Art Institute, Laney College
- Known for: Sculpture, Installation art
- Awards: N.E.A. Artist Fellowship grant, Adaline Kent Award, The Engelhard Award, American Academy of Art, Rome

David Kenneth Ireland (August 25, 1930 – May 17, 2009) was an American sculptor, conceptual artist and Minimalist architect.

== Early life ==
Born in Bellingham, Washington. He studied Printmaking and Industrial Arts at California College of Arts and Crafts (CCA), graduating in 1953 with his BFA degree. After college he attended United States Army service. After leaving the Army Ireland traveled Europe extensively, working as an illustrator, and eventually traveled to Africa to lead safari trips.

== Work ==
It was not until his 40s that Ireland decided to dedicate himself to work as a full-time artist. He returned to the United States and returned to school, this time at the San Francisco Art Institute. Upon graduating from the San Francisco Art Institute in 1974, Ireland spent a year working in New York, before returning to settle in San Francisco.

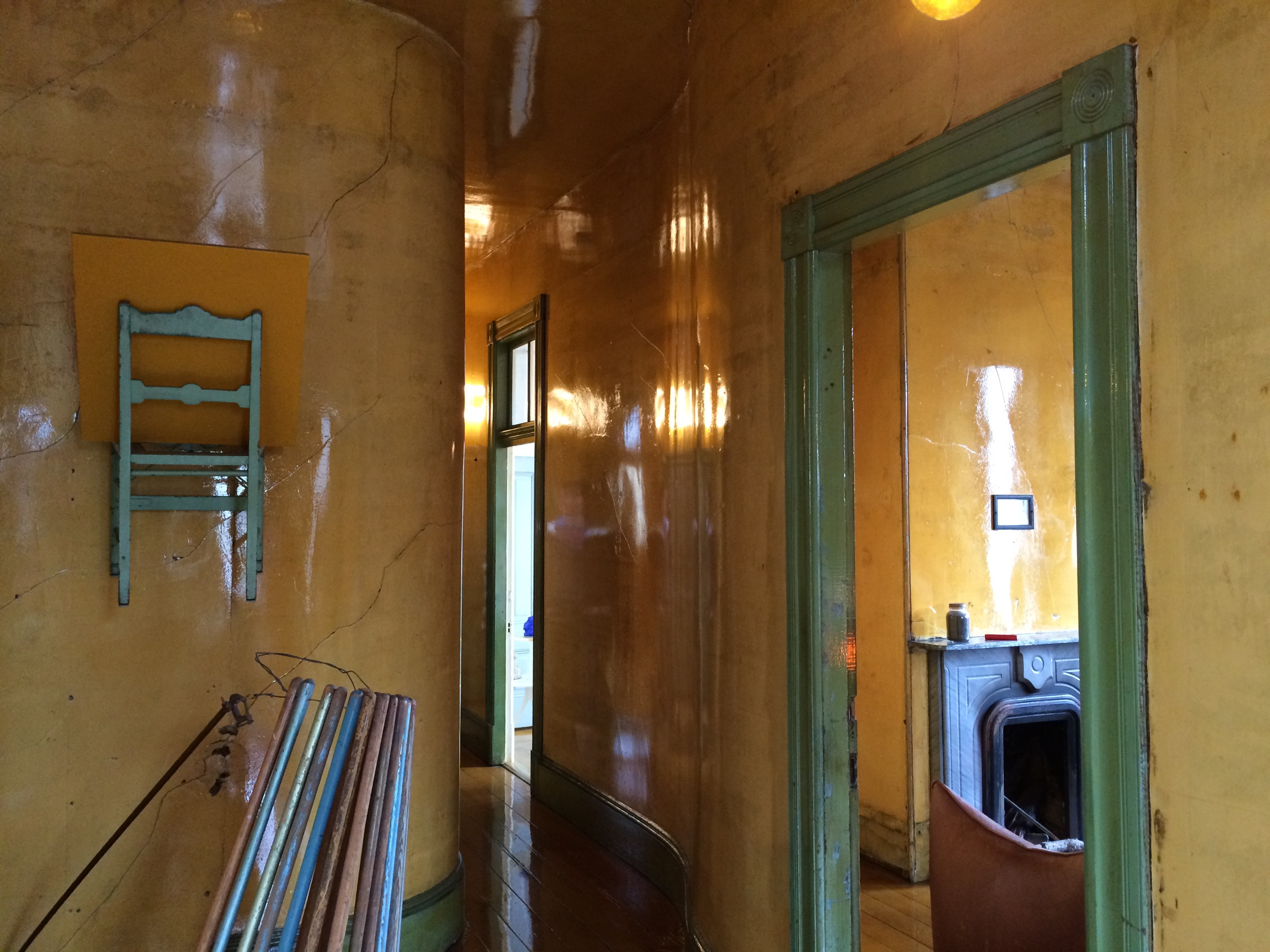
Upstairs hallway at 500 Capp St., with treated walls and other sculptural installations

In 1975, Ireland purchased a victorian house built in 1886 from Paul John Greub, an accordion maker, for $50,000. The house is located at 500 Capp Street (20th Street and Capp Street) in the Mission District of San Francisco.

In 1979, Ireland purchased another house at 65 Capp Street, which he transformed thoroughly. The house was purchased by art collector by Ann Hatch in 1982 and later used as an artist residency named Capp Street Project.

In 1987, Ireland won the Adaline Kent award from San Francisco Art Institute (SFAI).

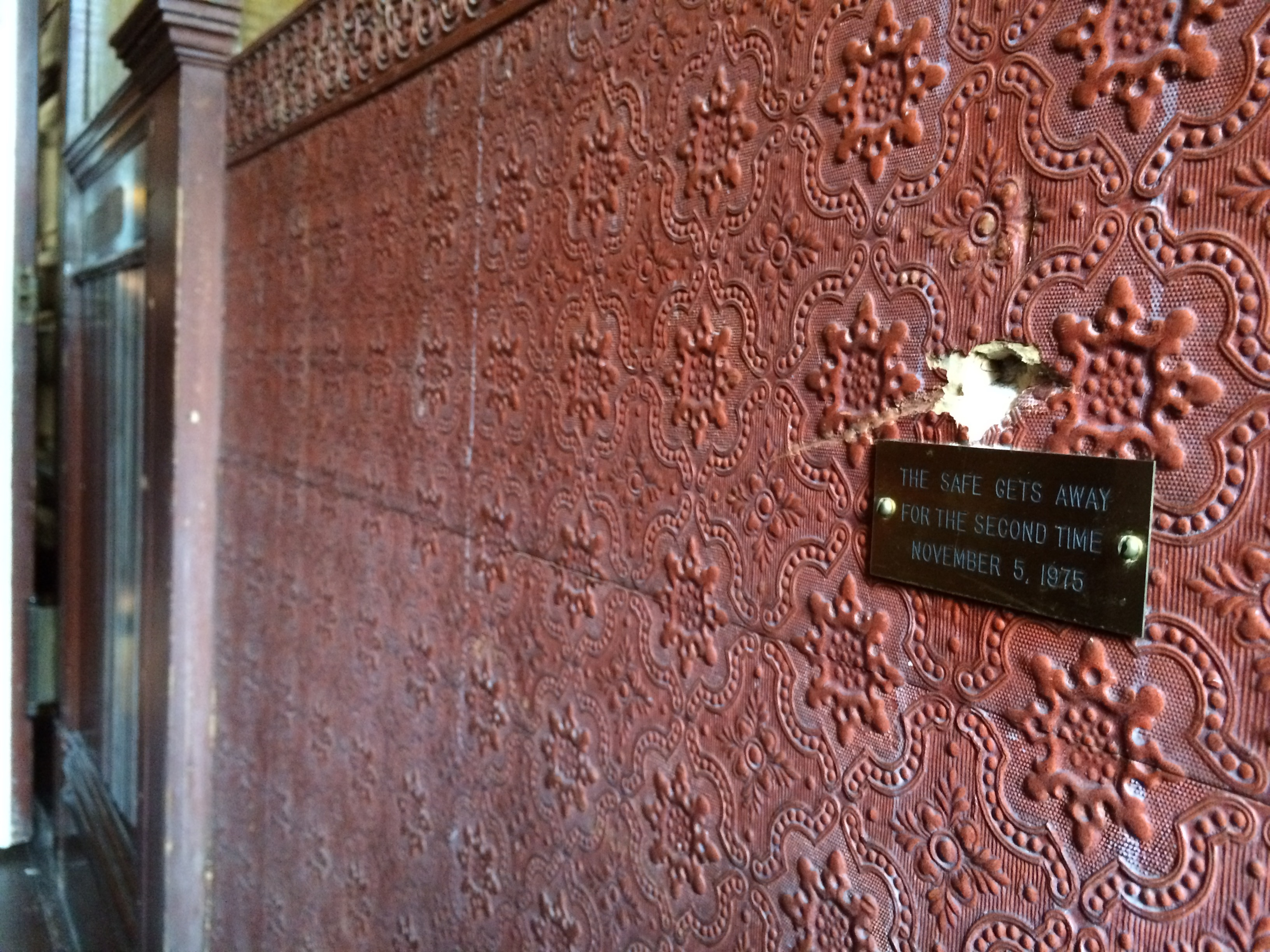
"The safe gets away for the second time", part of 500 Capp St.

Ireland is most well known for creating site-specific installation art pieces; most notably, his former residence at 500 Capp Street in San Francisco, where his work is also shown at Gallery Paule Anglim. Moving between two and three dimensions within the same sculptures, Ireland explores concepts of scale and vision. Known for his wide range of materials, works are made from paint cans, phone books, metal, cement, wood and, even the skull of a water buffalo.

In 1999, Ireland collaborated with sound artist GX Jupitter-Larsen remixing and re-recording tapes from the audio archives of 500 Capp Street. The outcome was released as a CD on Vinyl Communications.

To accompany Ireland's first solo exhibition in London, Ridinghouse published David Ireland: Sculptures, Paintings, Drawings. This catalogue features a selection of Ireland's works from over four decades. An introduction to the work of this artist, this publication also includes an essay by Kenneth Baker, art critic of the San Francisco Chronicle.

One of his most prominent works Angel-Go-Round (1996), features a rotating angel above garden sculptures. The work was initially installed at the Yerba Buena Center for the Arts in 1996 by Chief Preparator Mark Sabatino, and later acquired by the di Rosa Center for Contemporary Artis in the permanent collection of di Rosa, Napa.

In early 2016, the San Francisco Art Institute organized an exhibition of Ireland's work, in conjunction with the public opening of 500 Capp Street, now known as The David Ireland House.

== Legacy ==
David Ireland’s house at 500 Capp Street was purchased by art collector Carlie Wilmans in 2008. Wilmans established the 500 Capp Street Foundation the same year to preserve and study his work. The house was restored in 2016 and turned into an exhibition venue named The David Ireland House.

== See also ==
- Capp Street Project
