= Anoka Faruqee =

American painter

Anoka Faruqee (born 1972) is a Bangladeshi descent American painter, born in Ann Arbor, MI to Bangladeshi parents. In 2011 Faruqee was appointed associate professor of painting and printmaking at Yale University. She earned her BA from Yale in 1994 and an MFA from Tyler School of Art in 1997. Previous to her appointment at Yale, Faruqee taught at the School of the Art Institute of Chicago and the California Institute of the Arts, where she was co-director of the Art Program. Faruqee is known for her brightly colored Moiré pattern paintings.

Faruqee is represented by the Koenig & Clinton Gallery in New York City and the Hosfelt Gallery in San Francisco.

In 2001 Faruqee received an Artadia Award.

== Exhibition reviews ==
Susan Snodgrass, reviewing her 2005 joint exhibition with David Driscoll at Zolla/Lieberman in Art in America saw in her work influences from computer technologies, weaving, and Islamic tiling. In other works on exhibit, Snodgrass saw "[i]ssues of authenticity and pictorial reproduction".

Karen Rapp in reviewing her 2013 exhibition at the Hosfelt Gallery in Art in America writes..."Faruqee’s emphasis on the painterly process in fact gets to the heart of her interests. Serving as more than just optical games, these paintings show the artist embracing the fallibility of materiality---be it the unpredictability of her medium or the inevitability of human error. It is the oscillation between the handmade and the machine like that makes the canvases accomplished and compelling works of art rather than simply visual novelties"....

== Bibliography ==
- Faruquee, Anoka (September 2003). "Enumerating Infinity: Cloning Color". Visual Resources. 19 (3): 179–193. doi:10.1080/0197376032000118093. S2CID 59150688.
