= Michael Light =

American photographer

- Born: 1963 (age 62–63); Clearwater, Florida, United States
- Education: San Francisco Art Institute, Amherst College
- Known for: Photography, books, landscape, archival photographic projects
- Awards: Guggenheim Fellowship, Artadia Award
- Website: www.michaellight.net

Michael Light, Salt Tracks Looking Northwest, Pleistocene Lake Bonneville, Wendover, Utah, 2017.

Michael Light (born 1963) is a San Francisco-based photographer and book maker whose work focuses on landscape, the environment, and American culture's relationship to both. He is known for aerial photographs of American western landscapes collectively titled "Some Dry Space: An Inhabited West" and for two archival projects focused on historical photographs of the Apollo lunar missions and U.S. atmospheric nuclear detonation tests, represented by the books Full Moon (1999) and 100 Suns (2003), respectively. Los Angeles Times critic Leah Ollman characterized his work as "largely about what we consider ours, how we act on that assumption, and what the visual manifestations of those claims look like ... [It] seduces and troubles in shifting measure."

Light's projects have been exhibited at museums including San Francisco Museum of Modern Art (SFMOMA), American Museum of Natural History, Hayward Gallery (London), Museum of Contemporary Art, Sydney, and Nevada Museum of Art. His work belongs to the collections of the Los Angeles County Museum of Art (LACMA), Victoria & Albert Museum (London), Hasselblad Foundation, and SFMOMA, among others. In 2007, Light was awarded a Guggenheim Fellowship in photography.

== Early life and career ==
Light was born in Clearwater, Florida in 1963 to land conservationist Deborah Ann Light and painter Robert Thomas Taugner. He grew up in Amagansett, New York, on land that in 1990 became Quail Hill Farm, an early community-supported agriculture (CSA) farm in the U.S., and New York's first. His great-uncle was Richard Upjohn Light, a neurosurgeon, cinematographer, American Geographical Society president and aviator, who in 1934—seven years after Lindbergh's Atlantic flight—made a near round-the-world trip in a seaplane. Michael Light himself learned to fly before he could drive, soloing in gliders at fourteen and earning a pilot’s license when he was sixteen.

After receiving a BA in American Studies from Amherst College in 1986, Light moved west to attend the San Francisco Art Institute. He earned an MFA in Photography in 1993, focusing on landscape imagery while also studying informally with conceptual photographer Larry Sultan. His early black-and-white work appears in his book Ranch (1993, Twin Palms Publishers), which documents the brute realities of the cattle business on one of California's last traditional ranches. Beginning in the 2000s, Light combined his interests in flying and landscape to produce aerial photographic series shot from self-piloted and rented aircraft.

Michael Light, Highways 5, 10, 60 and 101 Looking West, L. A. River and Downtown Beyond, Los Angeles, 2004.

== Work ==
Light has focused on epic subjects—human mythologies and environmental impacts, geology, the Apollo Moon missions, nuclear bomb tests—examined through expansive views of landscape. Writer Lawrence Weschler described Light as "a photographer of the tragedy of the commons," whose work, "by turns fiercely political and achingly rhapsodic … has come to focus, with gathering power and lucidity, on the rapture and the rupture that are man’s trace on the land." Other critics liken him to photographers exploring beauty and toxicity, such as David Maisel, Richard Misrach, Edward Burtynsky and Emmet Gowin, while characterizing his concerns as less overtly environmental and more romantic. While Light frequently exhibits prints, his primary format is the book—both handmade and published formats—which allows for greater elaboration of his subjects.

=== Archival photographic works ===
Light's archival projects, Full Moon and 100 Suns, are concerned with power, landscape and the human relationship to vastness. He explored these themes in books and exhibitions that eschewed polemics in favor of narrative, interpretive curation and matter-of-fact presentation: historical images with little or no text that proffered "the quotidian bumping gently into the unprecedented," according to New Yorker critic Anthony Lane.

Light's book Full Moon (1999) comprised 129 largely unpublished images taken by astronauts on the 1968–72 lunar missions, which he culled from more than 33,000 stills in the NASA archive. He digitally scanned master duplicates of the original film, reproducing the precise detail (dust, craters, mountains and seas) and "airless clarity" created by the vacuum of space. He then organized the images into a "composite" mission—including sophisticated, multi-image photomontages—of journey, spacewalking and return to Earth, to tell a less traditional, more human and personal story. Reviews described the resulting landscapes as dazzling and terrifying, "strangely fragile and tranquil," and visually disorienting in their collapse of spatial reality; Los Angeles Times critic Christopher Knight wrote that Light's method produced an exhilarating "dual sense of scientific reality and science fiction."

For 100 Suns (2003), Light selected one hundred images of atmospheric nuclear bomb tests from the US National Archives and Los Alamos National Laboratory holdings—many made anonymously between 1945 and 1962. After scanning (and occasionally retouching) the stark images, he organized them into an escalating narrative that reviews described as "sickeningly seductive" in its "eerie radiance" and ghastly in its ramifications. Artforum's Glen Helfand wrote that the texture, deceptive scale, and spectacle (particularly glowing, saturated-orange images of mushroom clouds) "offer an ambivalent, engrossing mixture of beauty, hindsight, and horror," often belied by images of troops in goggles casually witnessing blasts at shockingly close range from Adirondack chairs.

Michael Light, Black Rock City in June, Looking Southeast, Pleistocene Lake Lahontan, Gerlach, Nevada, 2018.

=== Aerial photography projects ===
Light's aerial work is largely contained within his ongoing, multi-series "Some Dry Space: An Inhabited West" project, which includes exhibitions of large-format, limited-edition, hand-made books (often displayed on tripods) and prints, as well as four published books. Often shot low to the ground from vertiginous, tilted angles, these images examine the scars created by intensive strip mining and industrialization, urbanization, land development and human movement. Light chooses mainly western locales—the urban sprawl of Los Angeles, Utah's Bingham Canyon Mine (the largest man-made excavation), ex-urban luxury housing developments outside Phoenix and Las Vegas, and the Great Basin desert—for their aridness and lack of vegetation, which allow unobscured views of human impacts. Critics have described the series as balanced between surreal beauty and unmerciful depiction, offering elegies that "entomb the information by which we will be judged in the future" and a "metaphor for the shock-and-awe violence characterizing American frontiers past, present, and future."

Light's Los Angeles work (2004–5) consists of harsh and analytical, black-and-white day images of cityscapes, snarling freeways, the central river, railway and industrial yards—often shot directly into the sun with glaring white skies—and soft, improvisatory, largely black and abstract night images. His color images of built and half-built resort communities (including the "Lake Las Vegas" and "Black Mountain" series, 2010–2) capture incongruous palettes of golf-course greens and swimming-pool blues and abstract patterns of terraformed mountains graded into building pads that seem collaged onto stark desert terrain. Often left to revert to sagebrush in bankruptcy, the aborted developments resemble abandoned mining operations, leading writers to note an "ugly convergence" between expansionism and the American dream, the economic vertigo of conspicuous consumption and housing market collapses, and the ecological nightmares of heavy industry.

In the "Lake Lahontan" and "Lake Bonneville" (both 2017–8) series, Light captured spiraling swirls of vehicle tracks, roads and trails and "city" grids from Burning Man etched into the Nevada desert and Utah salt flats; reviews liken them to historical human traces (North American wagon trails, Apollo mission rover paths) and, in form, to abstract Brice Marden paintings, the calligraphic drawings of Cy Twombly, and graffiti.

== Publications ==
- Ranch. Santa Fe, NM: Twin Palms, 1993. With essay by Rebecca Solnit.
- Full Moon. New York: Alfred A. Knopf, 1999. With essays by Andrew Chaikin and Michael Light. 12 global editions.
- 100 Suns: 1945-1962. New York: Alfred A. Knopf, 2003. Six global editions.
- Some Dry Space: An Inhabited West. Reno, NV: Nevada Museum of Art, 2008. With essays by Ann M Wolfe and William L Fox.
- Bingham Mine/Garfield Stack. Santa Fe, NM: Radius, 2009. With essay by Trevor Paglen.
- LA Day/LA Night. Santa Fe, NM: Radius, 2010. With interview by Lawrence Weschler and essay by David L Ulin.
- Lake Las Vegas/Black Mountain. Santa Fe, NM: Radius, 2014. With essays by Rebecca Solnit and Lucy Lippard.
- Lake Lahontan/Lake Bonneville. Santa Fe, NM: Radius, 2019. With essays by Charles Hood, William L Fox, and Leah Ollman.

== Awards ==
- 2007: Guggenheim Fellowship
- 2007: Artadia Award

== Collections ==
Light's work is held in the following permanent collections:

- Australian Centre for the Moving Image
- Fine Arts Museums of San Francisco
- Getty Research Institute
- Hasselblad Foundation
- Huis Marseille, Museum for Photography
- LACMA
- Museum of Photographic Arts
- SFMOMA
- San Jose Museum of Art
- Santa Barbara Museum of Art
- Victoria & Albert Museum
