= Alix Pearlstein =

American visual artist (born 1962)

- Born: 1962 (age 63–64); New York City
- Known for: Video art, performance art
- Website: www.alixpearlstein.com

Alix Pearlstein (born 1962) is an American visual artist, who is particularly well known for her work in video art and performance art. Currently, Pearlstein is on the faculty of the M.F.A Program at School of Visual Arts in New York City, New York and serves on the Board of Governors of The Skowhegan School of Painting and Sculpture.

== Early life and education ==
Alix Pearlstein was born in 1962 in New York City, New York. In 1983 she attained a Bachelor of Science degree from Cornell University. In 1988 she attained a Masters of Fine Arts degree in Sculpture from the State University of New York at Purchase in Purchase, New York.

== Career ==
Pearlstein creates work that can oftentimes combine elements of performance, video art, sculpture and conceptual art. Having exhibited in New York since 1988, Beginning her career as a sculptor, Pearlstein has exhibited in New York since 1988, and started producing video in 1992. Her work often features elements of comedy and dead-pan humor. She has stated that she consciously evades genre. Pearlstein's art draws inspiration from Post-Minimal, structuralist film, postmodern dance, and Conceptual artists such as Dan Graham, particularly looking at the use of space in film and video. In many of her works, Pearlstein gives unscripted, mise-en-scène instructions to performers, resulting in long, suspenseful shots. She received a Foundation for Contemporary Arts Grants to Artists award (2011).

=== Select solo exhibitions ===
- The King, the Mice and the Cheese, List Visual Arts Center (2006)
- After the Fall, The Kitchen (2007–2008)
- One Side of Two Women 2, The Kitchen (2007–2008)
- Goldrush, Contemporary Art Museum St. Louis (2009)
- The Park, DeCordova Museum and Sculpture Park (2014)
- The Shining, Art Basel Miami Beach (2014)
- GRASS, University of Kentucky Art Museum (2018)

=== Select group exhibitions ===
- Mediated Presence: 3 Decades of Video from EAI, Dia Art Foundation (1997)
- Regarding Beauty, Hirshhorn Museum and Sculpture Garden (1999)
- Drama Queens: Women Behind the Camera, Solomon R. Guggenheim Museum (2001)
- Artists' Film International, Whitechapel Gallery (2013)
- Histories of Sexuality, The New Museum (2015)
- Front International, Cleveland Triennial for Contemporary Art (2018)
- Louder than Words, Zuckerman Museum of Art (2019)

== Public collections ==
Pearlstein's work can be found in a number of public institutions, including:

- Museum of Modern Art
