= Wattis Institute for Contemporary Arts =

Art center in San Francisco, California

Coordinates: 37.767160°N 122.400046°W

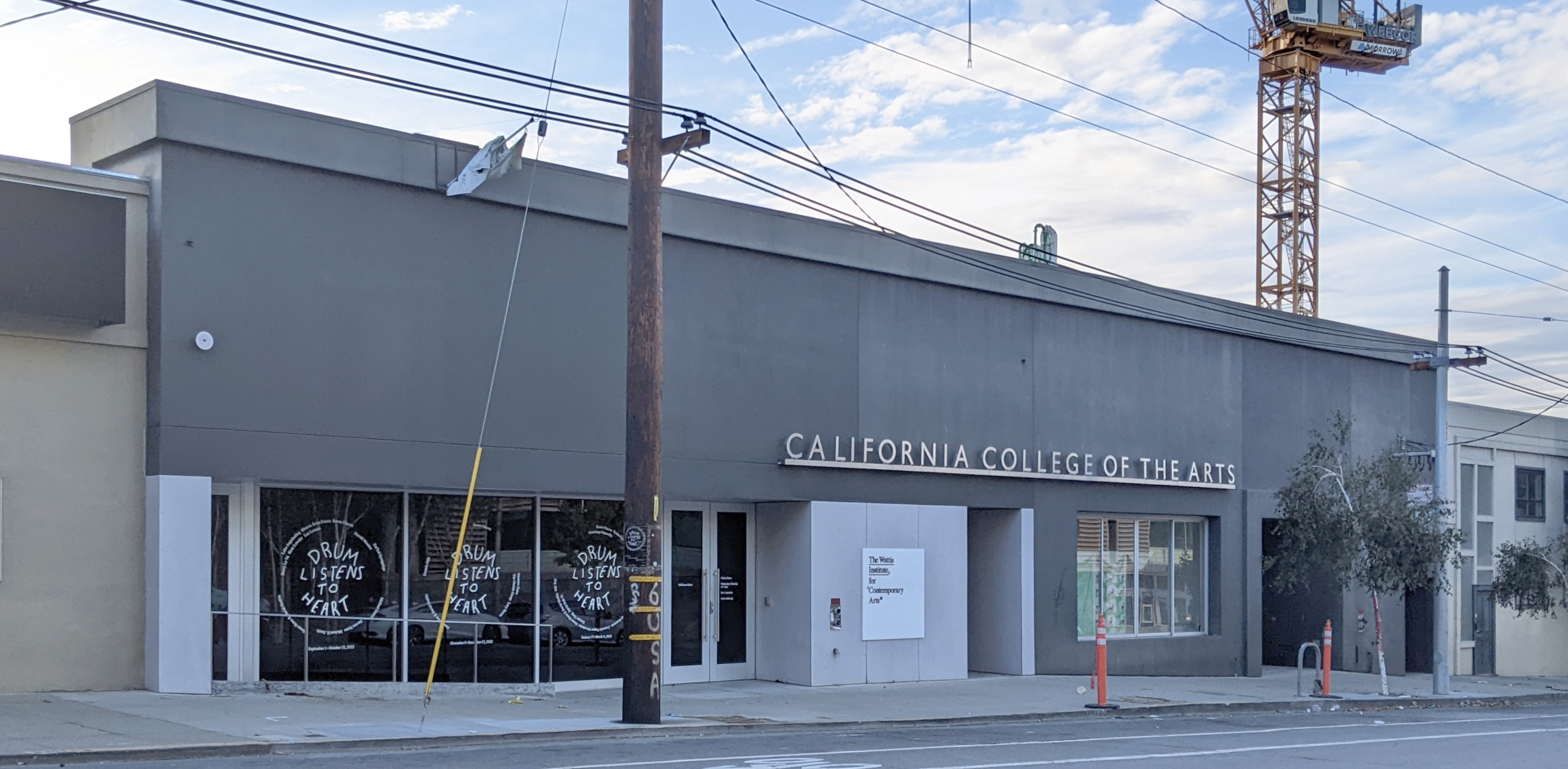
- Established: 1998; 28 years ago
- Location: 145 Hooper Street; Level 2 San Francisco, CA 94107; United States of America
- Founder: Lawrence Rinder
- Director: Daisy Nam
- Website: wattis.org

The Wattis Institute for Contemporary Arts is a nonprofit contemporary art center and research institute in San Francisco. It is part of the California College of the Arts. The institute holds exhibitions, lectures, and symposia, releases publications, and runs the Capp Street Project residency program.

== History and location ==
The Wattis Institute for Contemporary Arts was founded in 1998 by Lawrence Rinder. It was originally named the CCAC Institute of Exhibitions and Public Programming, and was renamed is 2002 following the death of Phyllis C. Wattis, a San Francisco cultural philanthropist and the great-granddaughter of Brigham Young. Wattis was born in 1905 and contributed more than $150 million to cultural institutions in California. The art center was originally located on the San Francisco campus of the California College of the Arts, in a refurbished 160,000-square-foot (15,000 m^{2}) former Greyhound Bus maintenance facility designed in 1951 by Skidmore, Owings and Merrill. The Wattis Institute opened its new location at 360 Kansas Street in January 2013. The facility was redesigned by architect Mark Jensen, best known for his work with the Rooftop Garden at the San Francisco Museum of Modern Art.

== Directors ==
The following have served as Director of the Wattis institute for Contemporary Arts:

- Lawrence Rinder (1998-2000)
- Ralph Rugoff (2000-2006)
- Jens Hoffmann (2006-2012)
- Anthony Huberman (2013-2023)
- Daisy Nam (2024-current)

== Capp Street Project ==
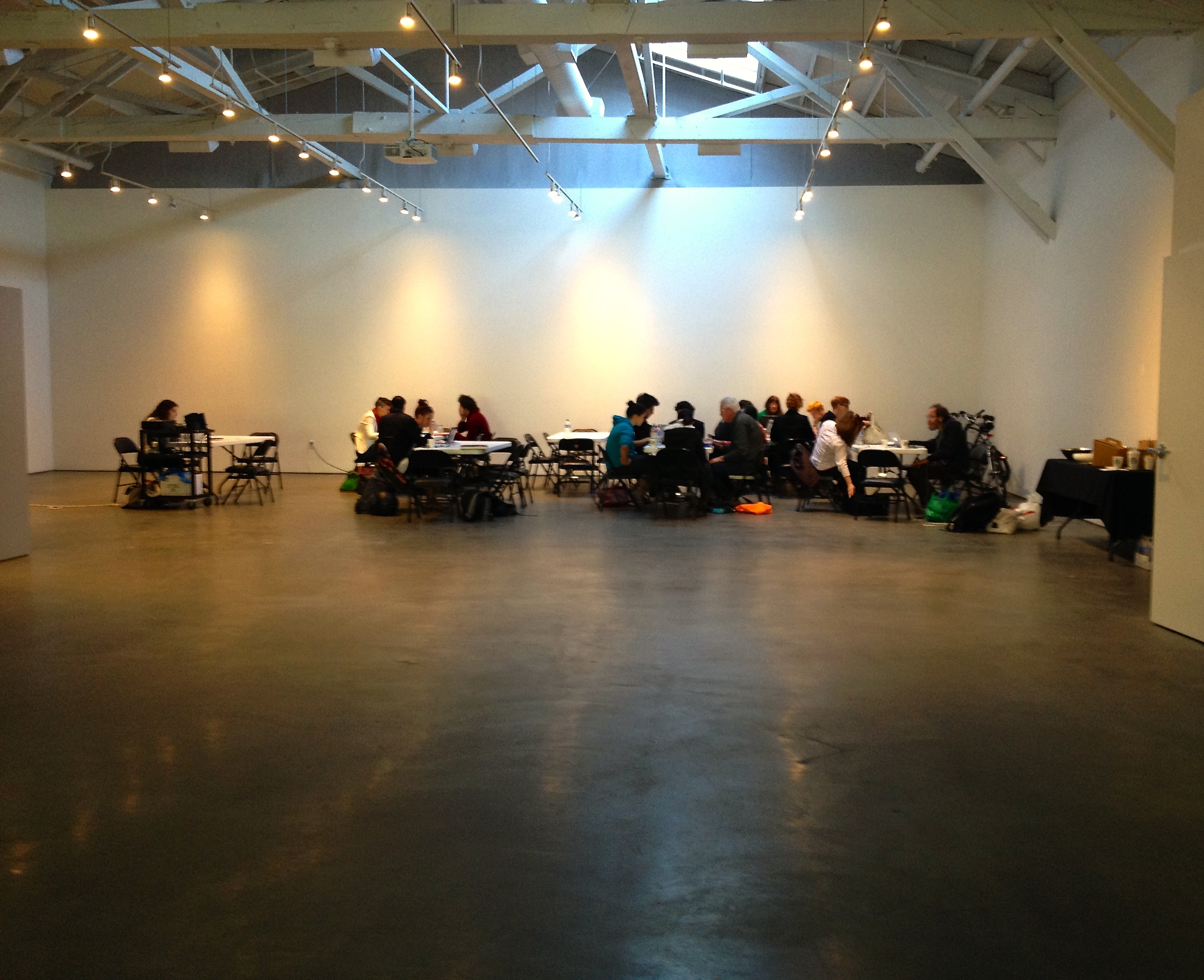
Wikipedia ArtAndFeminism Meetup at Wattis Institute for Contemporary Arts, San Francisco, February 1, 2014.

The Wattis Institute also runs the Capp Street Project, a visual arts residency dedicated to the creation and presentation of new art installations. It was founded in San Francisco in 1983, and by 2020 had supported over 100 local, national, and international artists through its residency and public exhibition programs.

== See also ==
- Institute of Contemporary Art San Francisco
