= Jim Campbell (artist) =

San Francisco artist

- Born: 1956 (age 68–69); Chicago, Illinois, U.S.
- Education: Massachusetts Institute of Technology (BS)
- Occupation: Artist
- Website: www.jimcampbell.tv

Jim Campbell (born 1956 in Chicago, Illinois) is a contemporary San Francisco based artist who is known for his LED light works. Campbell began his artistic career in film making but switched to electronic sculpture in 1990 and started making his iconic LED matrix works in 2000. His current work combines film, sound, and LED light installations.

== Early life and career ==
Born in Chicago in 1956, Jim Campbell moved to San Francisco after earning a B.S. degree from the Massachusetts Institute of Technology in electrical engineering and mathematics in 1978. In the mid 1980s, Campbell shifted from filmmaking to interactive video installations, establishing LEDs as his primary medium in 2000. A trailblazer in computer technology as art form, Campbell explores the distinctions of human "knowledge" and mathematical "data" through his LED grids of pixilated representations. Campbell's work has been exhibited at the Whitney Museum of American Art, the Metropolitan Museum of Art, and other notable museums.

== Public collections ==
Campbell's work is part of numerous public collections such as the Metropolitan Museum of Art, New York; The Museum of Modern Art, New York; Smithsonian American Art Museum, Washington, DC; The Whitney Museum of American Art, New York; the San Francisco Museum of Modern Art.

In the fall of 2010, Campbell's work, "Scattered Light" was installed in the Madison Square Park Conservancy in Manhattan making it the largest and most extensive public art piece of his to date. Hundreds of hovering tiny lights made up a large-scale, three-dimensional public installation.

His installation, "Day for Night", at the top of Salesforce Tower debuted 21 May 2018, making it the tallest artwork on earth.

== Awards and commissions ==
- 2010–2017: Werner Klotz & Jim Campbell Reflecting Ribbon, The New San Francisco Central Subway, Union Square Market Station
- 2014: Eternal Recurrence, for Fleeting Light 4th Large Scale Interactive Media Art Installation, ICC Tower (International Commercial Center), Hong Kong.
- 2010–2013: San Diego County Regional Airport Authority Installation
- 2010–2011: Madison Square Park Conservancy, "Scattered Light", New York
- 2003–2004: Guggenheim Fellowship (This award is given to those who show "exceptional capacity for productive scholarship or exceptional creative ability in the arts.")
- 2002–2003: Langlois Foundation Grant, Montreal
- 1999–2000: Rockefeller Foundation Fellowship Award in Multimedia
- 1999–2001: Eureka Fellowship Award, Fleishhacker Foundation
- 1996: SECA Electronic Media Award, San Francisco Museum of Modern Art

== Publications ==
1. Baker, Kenneth. "Electronics Artist Campbell Turns His Eye Toward Mass Protests, Echoing Futurists." San Francisco Chronicle. February 26, 2005, pp. E1, 10.
2. Baker, Kenneth. "‘Home Movies’ Not Like the Ones Your Dad Made." San Francisco Chronicle. April 14, 2007, sec. E, p. 1.
3. Vogel, Carol. "Inside Art: Madison Park, All Aglow", The New York Times. July 29, 2010.
4. Zuckerman-Jacobsen, Heidi. "Jim Campbell / MATRIX 208 Memory Array." Berkeley Art Museum, 2003.
