= Capp Street Project =

Capp Street Project is an artist residency program that was originally located at 65 Capp Street in San Francisco, California. CSP was established as a program to nurture experimental art making in 1983 with the first visual arts residency in the United States dedicated solely to the creation and presentation of new art installations and conceptual art. The Capp Street Project name and concept has existed since 1983, although the physical space which the residency and exhibition program occupied has changed several times.

In 1998, Capp Street Project united with California College of the Arts’ Wattis Institute for Contemporary Arts. In 2014, Wattis celebrated 30 years of Capp Street Project Art.

== History ==
In 1983, Capp Street Project was created by Ann Hatch who acquired a David Ireland designed house at 65 Capp Street in San Francisco. Although Hatch's original intention was to preserve the house as a work of art, the project ultimately took another direction. The artist-in-residency program was created and became central to Capp Street Project.

== Locations ==
=== 65 Capp Street ===
The Capp Street Project programming was initially located at 65 Capp Street in San Francisco. The house at 65 Capp Street had previously belonged to David Ireland who had purchased it in 1979 and then transformed it into an acclaimed work of minimalist architecture. In 1981 Ann Hatch acquired the house which would serve as the first home base for the non-profit artist residency which she founded in 1983.

The 500 Capp Street house was purchased in 2008 by Carlie Wilmans, a granddaughter of Paul Lyman Wattis, (who headed Utah Construction and Mining Company that built Boulder Dam) and Phyllis Cannon Wattis (herself a great-granddaughter of Brigham Young), in order to preserve both the house and Ireland's work. Wilmans is on the board of the Capp Street Foundation.

=== Capp Street Project/AVT ===
In 1989 the Capp Street Project program, still under Ann Hatch, moved to a new location that was formerly a body-shop, the AVT auto garage at 270 14th Street, San Francisco. From 1989 to 1993 the program used the combined name Capp Street Project/AVT.

In 1998, Capp Street Project became part of the Wattis Institute for Contemporary Arts, which is in turn part of the California College of the Arts and the house at 65 Capp Street returned to the public sector. The house at 500 Capp opened to the public in 2016. Since its inception, Capp Street Project has given more than 100 local, national, and international artists the opportunity to create new work through its residency and public exhibition programs.

In 2016, the duplex next door to 65 Capp Street was purchased by Carlie Wilmans and she had made plans to also donate it to the Capp Street Project in order to create artist housing. In 2019, Wilmans attempted to evict six families, but due to public backlash the plans were stopped. As a result, the Capp Street Project foundation started to distanced itself from the founder that same year.

In 2019, the head curator of 500 Capp Street, Bob Linder was laid off in an effort to restructure the programming and lessen exhibitions by visiting artists.

== Artists ==
This is a list in alphabetical order by last name of artists who have participated in the Capp Street artist residency.

- Maryanne Amacher (1985);
- The Art Guys (1995), a collaborative art group from Texas;
- Jim Campbell (with Marie Navarre) (1995) Unforeseeable Memories;
- Bruce Charlesworth (1984) the first artist-in-residency at Capp Street Project;
- Guillermo Gómez-Peña (1989), as part of the Border Art Workshop (BAW);
- Ann Hamilton (1989), In Privation and Excesses, Hamilton used 700,000 pennies, among other materials, to create a poetic exploration of systems and mediums of exchange. The installation was featured on the cover of Artforum, a career-making event for the artist.;
- Mona Hatoum (1996);
- Paul Kos (1986);
- Tony Labat (1987);
- Hung Liu;
- Liza Lou (1996)
- Mary Lucier;
- John Maeda (2000);
- Tom Marioni (1990);
- Celia Álvarez Muñoz (1994);
- Glen Seator (1997)
- James Turrell (1984);
- Bill Viola (1989) Viola's installation Sanctuary combined video, earth, and redwood trees to create an urban refuge. A renowned video artist, Viola was also awarded a prestigious MacArthur Fellowship in 1989;
- Kara Walker (1999);
- Mel Ziegler (with Kate Ericson) (1991).

Terence Van Elslander, James Cathcart, Frank fantauzzi, 1995, Paper: 5 tons of scrap paper were bought stored and then sold back to the scrap paper market.
