= Lordy Rodriguez =

Filipino artist

Lordy Rodriguez (born 1976 in Quezon City, Philippines) is a contemporary artist who uses cartography and maps to reconfigure factual locations and create fictional assemblage pieces. Inspired by family road trips across the country, Rodriguez was influenced by the maps his family used to navigate the country.

Rodriquez has had solo exhibitions at the Austin Museum of Art (Austin, TX), the Hosfelt Gallery (San Francisco, CA), and Clementine Gallery (New York).

== Education ==
- 2008 M.F.A., Stanford University, CA
- 1999 B.F.A., School of Visual Arts, New York, NY
- 1997 University of Houston, Houston, TX

== Public collections ==
Rodriguez's work is part of the Achenbach Foundation for Graphic Arts, Fine Arts Museums of San Francisco.

== Publications ==
1. Harmon, Katharine. The Map As Art: Contemporary Artists Explore Cartography (Princeton Architectural Press, New York), 2009.
