= Johanna Walpurgis of Leiningen-Westerburg =

Duchess consort of Saxe-Weisselfels
- Tenure: 1672–1680
- Born: 3 June 1647; Schaumburg an der Lahn
- Died: 4 November 1687 (aged 40); Dahme
- Spouse: Augustus, Duke of Saxe-Weissenfels
- Issue: Frederick, Duke of Saxe-Weissenfels-Dahme; Prince Maurice
- House: Runkel
- Father: George William, Count of Leiningen-Westerburg
- Mother: Sophia Elisabeth of Lippe-Detmold

Johanna Walpurgis of Leiningen-Westerburg (3 June 1647 – 4 November 1687), was a German noblewoman member of the House of Runkel (through female line surnamed Leiningen-Westerburg) and by marriage Duchess of Saxe-Weissenfels.

Born in Schaumburg an der Lahn, she was the third of nineteen children born from the marriage of Georg Wilhelm, Count of Leiningen-Westerburg in Schaumburg and Countess Sophia Elisabeth of Lippe-Detmold. From her eighteen older and younger siblings, eleven survive adulthood: Simon Philipp, Frederick William, Maria Christiana (by marriage Countess Reuss of Lobenstein), Sophia Magdalena (by marriage Countess of Schönburg-Hartenstein), John Anton, Christoph Christian, Johanna Elisabeth (by her two marriages Countess of Wied-Runkel and Metternich-Winneburg), Angelika Catherine (by marriage Countess of Vasaborg), Henry Christian Frederick Ernest, Georg II Charles Louis and Juliana Eleonore (by marriage Countess of Metternich-Winneburg).

== Life ==
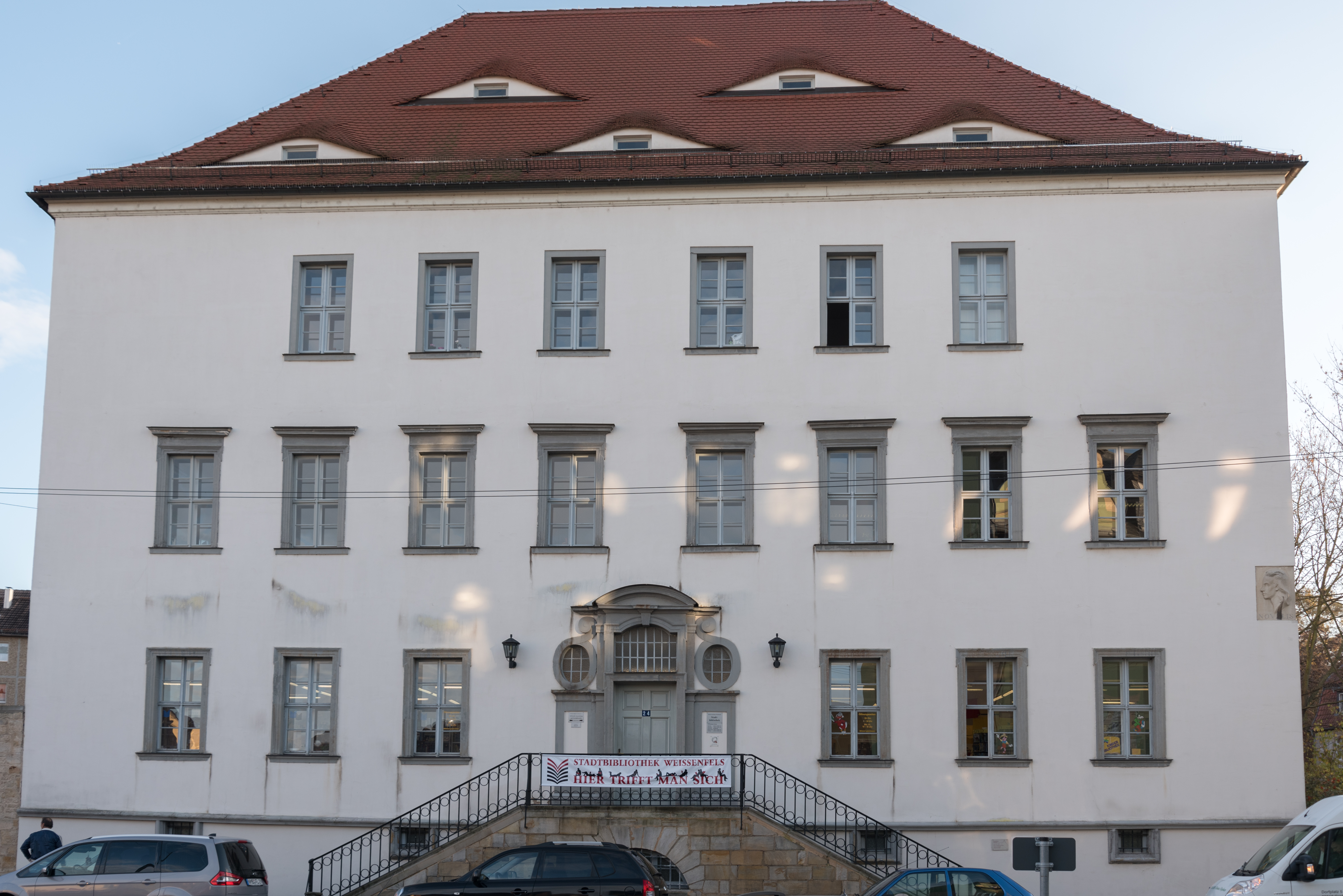
The house built in Weissenfels around 1680 as residence for the dowager duchess, today library and museum for the poet Novalis

In Halle on 29 January 1672, Johanna Walpurgis married Augustus, Duke of Saxe-Weissenfels as his second wife. They had three children:

1. Frederick, Duke of Saxe-Weissenfels-Dahme (Halle, 20 November 1673 – Dahme, 16 April 1715).
2. Maurice (Halle, 5 January 1676 – Szeged, Hungary, 12 September 1695).
3. Stillborn son (1679).

J Walpurgis died in Dahme aged 40, having survived her husband by seven years. She was buried in the Schlosskirche, Weissenfels.

Johanna Walpurgis of Leiningen-Westerburg House of Runkel (Leiningen-Westerburg branch) Born: 3 June 1647 Died: 4 November 1687
German royalty
Vacant Title last held by Anna Maria of Mecklenburg-Schwerin	Duchess consort of Saxe-Weissenfels; 1672–1680	Succeeded by Johanna Magdalena of Saxe-Altenburg
