= Emilie Agnes Reuss of Schleiz =

Duchess consort of Saxe-Weisselfels-Dahme
- Tenure: 1711–1715
- Born: 11 August 1667; Schleiz
- Died: 15 October 1729 (aged 62); Fürstlich Drehna
- Spouse: Balthasar Erdmann, Count of Promnitz-Pless; Frederick, Duke of Saxe-Weissenfels-Dahme
- Issue: Erdmann II, Count of Promnitz-Pless; Friedrich, Lord of Halbau; Heinrich of Promnitz-Pless; Esther Maximiliane Elisabeth of Promnitz-Pless; Philippine Henriette Theresia of Promnitz-Pless
- House: Reuss
- Father: Heinrich I, Count Reuss of Schleiz
- Mother: Esther of Hardegg auf Glatz und im Machlande

Countess Emilie Agnes Reuss of Schleiz (11 August 1667 – 15 October 1729), was a German noblewoman member of the House of Reuss and by her two marriages Countess of Promnitz-Pless and Duchess of Saxe-Weissenfels-Dahme.

Born in Schleiz, she was the fourth of eight children born from Heinrich I, Count Reuss of Schleiz and his first wife, Countess Esther of Hardegg auf Glatz und im Machlande. From her seven older and younger siblings, only one survive adulthood, Heinrich XI, Count of Reuss zu Schleiz. From her father's two next marriages with Countesses Maximiliana of Hardegg auf Glatz und im Machlande and Anna Elisabeth of Sinzendorf, she gained four half-siblings, of them only one survive: Heinrich XXIV, Count Reuss of Schleiz in Köstritz (son of Anna Elisabeth).

== Life ==
On 26 August 1673, all the members of the House of Reuss were raised to the rank of Imperial Counts (German: Reichsgraf). Emilie Agnes (aged 6) and her two surviving siblings at that point, Heinrich XI (aged 4) and Susanne Maria (aged 2 months; she died on 13 May 1675) were all named Counts and Countesses Reuss of Schleiz (German: Graf/Gräfin Reuss von Schleiz).

In Schleiz on 10 August 1682, Emilie Agnes married firstly Balthasar Erdmann, Count of Promnitz-Pless (Sorau, 9 January 1656 – Sorau, 3 May 1703). They had five children:

1. Erdmann II, Count of Promnitz-Pless (Sorau, 22 August 1683 – Jagdschloß Sorauer Forst, 7 September 1745).
2. Friedrich of Promnitz-Pless (Sorau, 11 October 1684 – Halbau, 13 June 1712), Lord of Halbau.
3. Heinrich of Promnitz-Pless (Sorau, 14 January 1686 – Sorau, 23 May 1700).
4. Esther Maximiliane Elisabeth of Promnitz-Pless (Sorau, 20 February 1687 – Sorau, 28 September 1701).
5. Philippine Henriette Theresia of Promnitz-Pless (Sorau, 25 November 1689 – Sorau, 30 November 1689).

In Dahme on 13 February 1711, Emilie Agnes married secondly Prince Frederick of Saxe-Weissenfels, youngest surviving son of Duke Augustus. Shortly after the wedding, he received the district of Dahme as appanage and took his residence there. He died four years later and they had no children.

She died in Fürstlich Drehna aged 62, having survived her second husband by fourteen years.

Emilie Agnes Reuss of Schleiz House of Reuss Born: 11 August 1667 Died: 15 October 1729
German royalty
new creation	Duchess consort of Saxe-Weissenfels-Dahme; 1711–1715	Duchy reincorporated to Saxe-Weissenfels
