= Frederick, Duke of Saxe-Weissenfels-Dahme =

Frederick
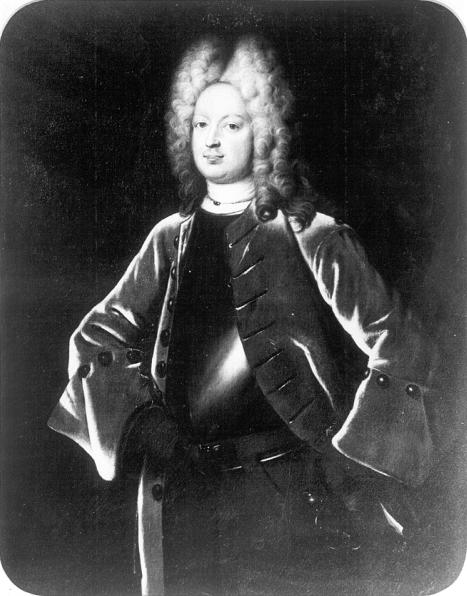

Duke of Saxe-Weisselfels-Dahme
- Reign: 1711-1715
- Born: 20 November 1673; Halle
- Died: 16 April 1715 (aged 41); Dahme
- Spouse: Emilie Agnes Reuss of Schleiz
- House: Wettin
- Father: Augustus, Duke of Saxe-Weissenfels
- Mother: Johanna Walpurgis of Leiningen-Westerburg

Frederick of Saxe-Weissenfels (Frederick Erdmann; b. Halle, 20 November 1673 - d. Dahme, 16 April 1715), was a German prince member of the House of Wettin and Duke of Saxe-Weissenfels-Dahme.

He was the sixth son of Augustus, Duke of Saxe-Weissenfels but first-born from his second marriage with Johanna Walpurgis of Leiningen-Westerburg.

== Life ==
Because as one of the youngest children of his father he didn't inherited a share of the Duchy of Saxe-Weissenfels, Frederick became devoted to a military career and therefore since he was fourteen (1687) stayed on the Saxon court in Dresden, where he became lieutenant general.

After an agreement with his nephew Johann Georg, Duke of Saxe-Weissenfels, he received the district of Dahme as his appanage, although without full sovereignty, being dependent from the eldest ruling branch.

In Dahme on 13 February 1711, Frederick married Emilie Agnes Reuss of Schleiz, Dowager Countess of Promnitz-Pless. They had no children.

Frederick took residence in his land and commissioned the architects Johann Christoph Schütze and Elias Scholtz from 1711 the construction of the Dahme Castle (German: Schloss Dahme) on the remains of the old-fashioned medieval fortress, who could be finished after four years of construction. The garden was a summerhouse, sandstone sculptures and caves according with the Baroque style. However, Frederick never lived there because he died shortly before the completion of the building. Instead, his widow Emilie Agnes took the Castle as her Wittum, but she later lived mainly in the other dominions who received from her first marriage, Vetschau and Fürstlich Drehna, where she died in 1729. Later the last Duke of the Saxe-Weissenfels branch, Johann Adolf II continued the construction work from 1719 and made the Dahme Castle his temporary residence.

Frederick died in Dahme aged 41. He was buried in the Schlosskirche, Weissenfels.

== Notes ==
Frederick, Duke of Saxe-Weissenfels-Dahme House of Wettin Born: 20 November 1673 Died: 16 April 1715
Preceded by New creation	Duke of Saxe-Weissenfels-Dahme; 1711–1715	Succeeded by Duchy reincorporated to Saxe-Weissenfels
