= Otto Unverdorben =

German chemist (1806–1873)

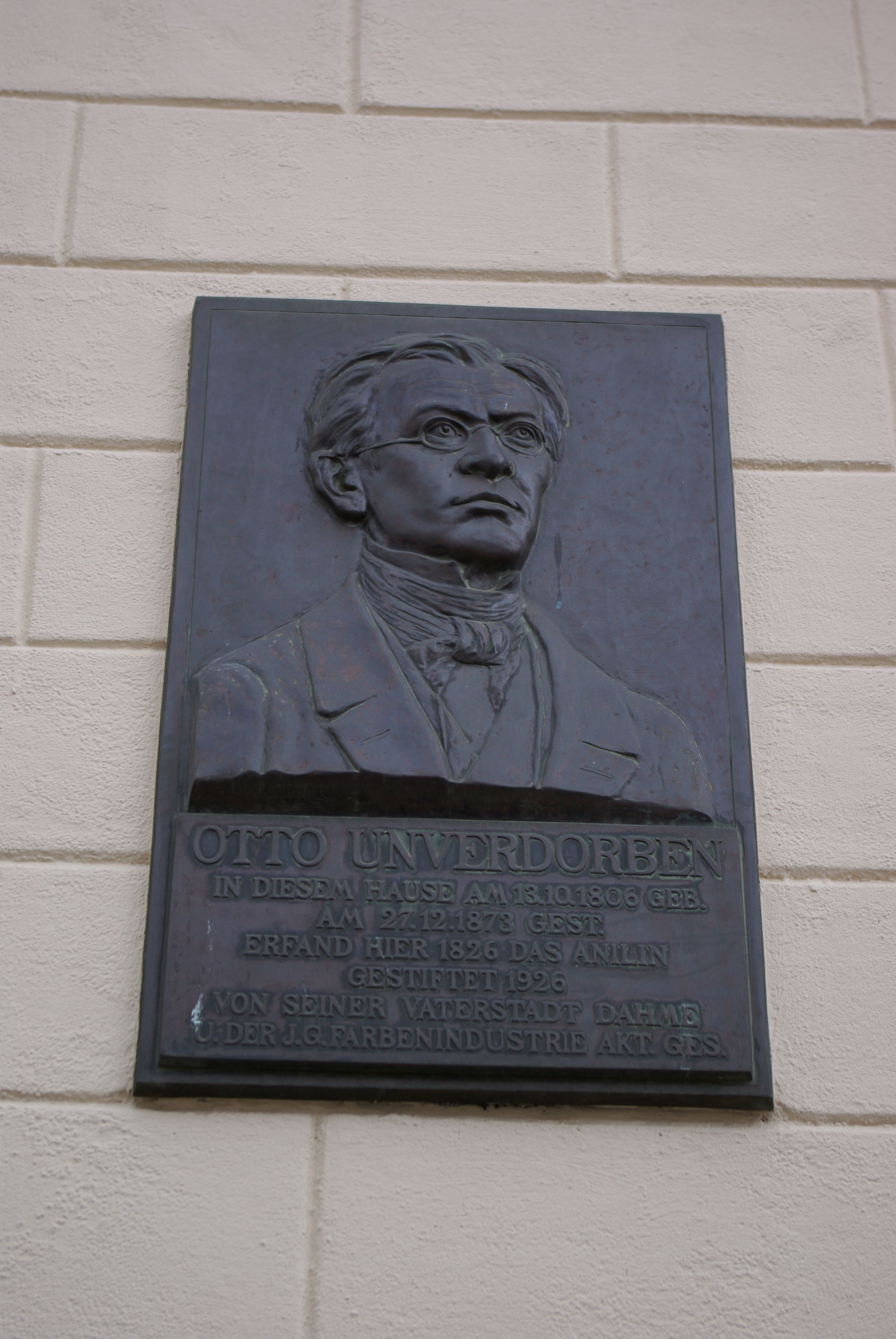
Plaque honoring Unverdorben at Hauptstraße 46/47 in Dahme/Mark

Otto Unverdorben (13 October 1806 – 28 November 1873) was a German chemist and merchant who was born in Dahme/Mark. After completing his schooling in Dresden, he studied chemistry at Halle, Leipzig and Berlin.

In 1826 at the age of 20, Unverdorben discovered aniline, which he obtained from the distillation of natural vegetable indigo. He called his discovery Crystallin. Aniline is important in the manufacture of dyes, plastics, and pharmaceuticals. In 1829 he returned to his hometown of Dahme/Mark and became successful in the cigar industry.

Today the Otto-Unverdorben Dahme-Oberschule is named in his honor.
