= Günther Marks =

German church musician

Günther Marks (28 November 1897 – 4 March 1978) was a German church musician, organist and composer. He was born in Gollnow, Pomerania, and died in Dahme, Brandenburg.
