= Johannes Groenland =

German botanist (1824–1891)

- Born: 8 April 1824; Altona, Duchy of Holstein
- Died: 13 February 1891 (aged 66); Dahme, Brandenburg, Germany
- Scientific career
- Fields: Botany, Horticulture, Microscopy, Pharmacology
- Workplaces: Vilmorin, Agricultural and Agricultural Chemistry Research Station (Dahme)

Johannes Groenland (also spelled Grönland and called "Jean Groenland," 1824–1891) was a German botanist, horticulturist, and microscopist.

== Early life ==
He was born on 8 April 1824 in Altona, a borough of Hamburg that was part of the Duchy of Holstein at that time. He was the son of Johann Friedrich Grönland, a German organist and music teacher.

== Career ==
=== Early career, First Schleswig War ===
Groenland was trained in pharmacology in his youth and served as a pharmacist in Altona, Hamburg, and Jena in his early 20s. In 1849, he joined the Schleswig-Holstein army to fight in the First Schleswig War.

=== Life in Paris ===
After the war, Groenland moved to Paris to work as an assistant to Louis de Vilmorin, a French biologist and horticulturist who was also a member of the family firm Vilmorin-Andrieux. While working for Vilmorin, Groenland worked with Theodor Rümpler to prepare the German edition of Les fleurs de pleine terre (Vilmorin's illustrierte Blumengärtnerei).

Groenland spent almost twenty years living in Paris working as a botanical researcher and horticulturist. He was a founding member of the Société botanique de France and was known for his work creating hybrids by crossing Triticum vulgare with various species of Aegilops. His botanical research also focused on liverworts, seagrasses, and the genus Drosera; and he served as the editor of the journal Revue horticole. In addition to his research and writing, Groenland developed skills in preparing botanical slides while living in Paris. He ran his own microscopist business from his residence at 13 Rue des Boulangers, and along with Marie Maxime Cornu and Gabriel Rivet, he wrote Des préparations microscopiques tirées du regne végétal, which was commonly used in the 19th century as a textbook on the preparation of microscope slides.

=== Move to Dahme ===
Groenland and his wife left Paris in May 1871 after the conclusion of the Franco-Prussian War. They settled in Dahme, Germany, where he worked as a botanist and professor of natural sciences at the Agricultural and Agricultural Chemistry Research Station until his death on 13 February 1891. At that time, he was also an active and important member of the Botanischer Verein der Provinz Brandenburg.

== Legacy ==
The genus Groenlandia in the family Potamogetonaceae (pondweed) is named in his honor.

== Selected works ==
- Mémoire sur la germination de quelques hépatiques (1854)
- Note sur l’Holcus setiger (1855)
- Note sur les organs glanduleux du genre Drosera (1856)
- Note sur l’hybridation du genre Aegilops (1857)
- Note sur les hybrids du genre Aegilops (1862)
- Histoire naturelle ilustrée: végétaux (1870)
- Des préparations microscopiques tirées du regne végétal (1872)
- Vilmorin's illustrierte Blumengärtnerei (1872-5)
