= County of Runkel =

German county during the Middle Ages

Coordinates: 50.4°N 8.15°E

County of Runkel Grafschaft Runkel
- 1219–1521
- Coat of arms
- Status: County
- Capital: Runkel
- Historical era: Middle Ages
  - Established: 1219
  - Inherited by County of Wied: 1521
Preceded by	Succeeded by
Duchy of Franconia	County of Wied / Wied

== History ==
County of Runkel was a German county that existed for about 300 years during the Middle Ages. It held a territory extending from the Lahn river at the town of Runkel northwards past Schupbach. To the south of this territory was the County of Limburg (which passed to the Archbishopric of Trier in the early 15th century), the County of Hadamar to the northwest, and the County of Weilburg to the west (both of which belonged to the Counts and Dukes of Nassau). Also part of the County was an exclave located to the east of Villmar. It was bordered by the County of Limburg to the south and west, and Weilburg to the northeast.

Runkel became a County in 1219. It was inherited by the Counts of Wied in 1521. With the partition of that County in 1698, it passed to the Counts of Wied-Runkel. Wied-Runkel was mediatised to the Dukes of Nassau-Weilburg in 1806.

== Counts of Runkel (1219–1521) ==
- Siegfried III (1219–27)
- Theodoric I (1227–?)
- Siegfried (?–1228)

(gap in record)

- Theodoric II (1305–25)

(gap in record)

- Henry (1351–61)

(gap in record)

- Theodoric III (1370–1403)
  - Siegfried (1375–88) (co-ruler)
- Frederick (1403–40)
- Theodoric IV (1403–60)
- John (1460–1521)
