= Dahme, Brandenburg =

Dahme
- Town
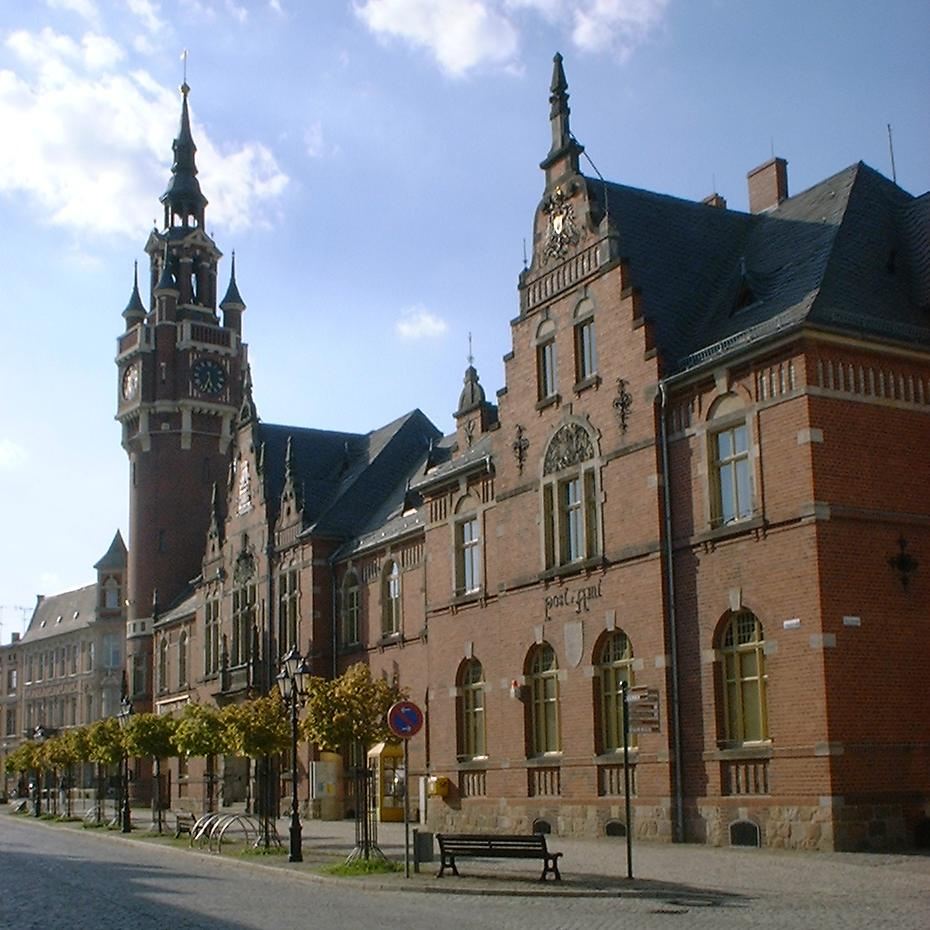
- Town hall and post office

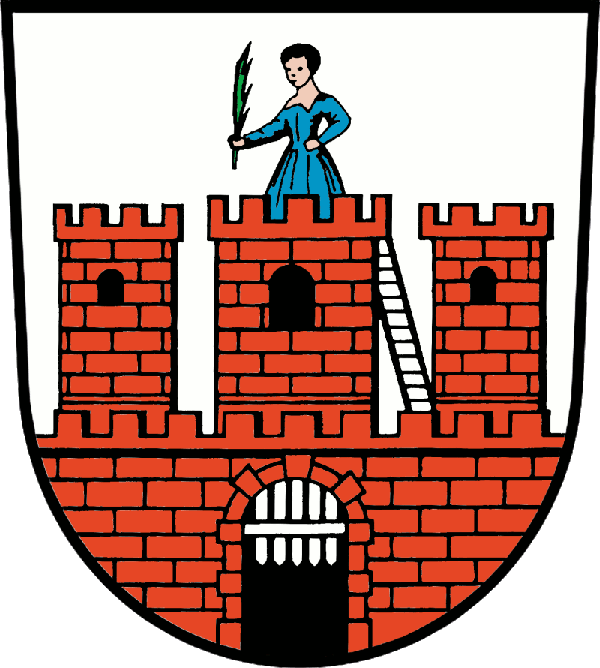
- Coat of arms

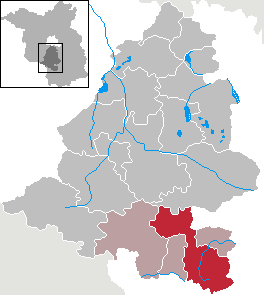
- Location of Dahme within Teltow-Fläming district
- Interactive map of Dahme
- Location within Germany Location within Brandenburg
- Coordinates: 51°52′00″N 13°25′59″E
- Country: Germany
- State: Brandenburg
- District: Teltow-Fläming
- Municipal assoc.: Dahme/Mark
- Subdivisions: 13 Ortsteile

Government
  - Mayor (2024–29): Thomas Willweber

Area
  - Total: 162.59 km^{2} (62.78 sq mi)
- Elevation: 87 m (285 ft)

Population (2025-12-31)
  - Total: 4,904
  - Density: 30.16/km^{2} (78.12/sq mi)
- Time zone: UTC+01:00 (CET)
  - Summer (DST): UTC+02:00 (CEST)
- Postal codes: 15936
- Dialling codes: 035451
- Vehicle registration: TF
- Website: www.dahme.de

Dahme (German pronunciation: [ˈdaːmə]; also: Dahme/Mark) is a town in the Teltow-Fläming district of Brandenburg, Germany. It is situated on the Dahme River, 30 km (19 mi) southeast of Luckenwalde, and 38 km (24 mi) west of Lübbenau.

== History ==
From 1815 to 1947, Dahme was part of the Prussian Province of Brandenburg. From 1952 to 1990, it was part of the Bezirk Cottbus of East Germany.

== Demography ==
Development of Population since 1875 within the Current Boundaries (Blue Line: Population; Dotted Line: Comparison to Population Development of Brandenburg state. Grey Background: Time of Nazi rule; Red Background: Time of Communist rule.)

Recent Population Development (Blue Line) and Forecasts

Dahme/Mark: Population development
within the current boundaries (2017)

Year	Pop.	±% p.a.
1875	8,674	—
1890	8,355	−0.25%
1910	8,976	+0.36%
1925	8,303	−0.52%
1933	8,009	−0.45%
1939	7,943	−0.14%
1946	10,840	+4.54%
1950	10,676	−0.38%
1964	8,756	−1.41%
1971	8,608	−0.24%
1981	7,610	−1.22%
1985	7,427	−0.61%
1989	7,271	−0.53%
1990	7,179	−1.27%

Year	Pop.	±% p.a.
1991	7,036	−1.99%
1992	6,839	−2.80%
1993	6,745	−1.37%
1994	6,698	−0.70%
1995	6,680	−0.27%
1996	6,506	−2.60%
1997	6,496	−0.15%
1998	6,399	−1.49%
1999	6,279	−1.88%
2000	6,219	−0.96%
2001	6,165	−0.87%
2002	6,147	−0.29%
2003	6,035	−1.82%
2004	5,910	−2.07%

Year	Pop.	±% p.a.
2005	5,790	−2.03%
2006	5,678	−1.93%
2007	5,583	−1.67%
2008	5,525	−1.04%
2009	5,412	−2.05%
2010	5,376	−0.67%
2011	5,288	−1.64%
2012	5,253	−0.66%
2013	5,194	−1.12%
2014	5,113	−1.56%
2015	5,073	−0.78%
2016	4,994	−1.56%
2017	4,930	−1.28%

== Notable people ==
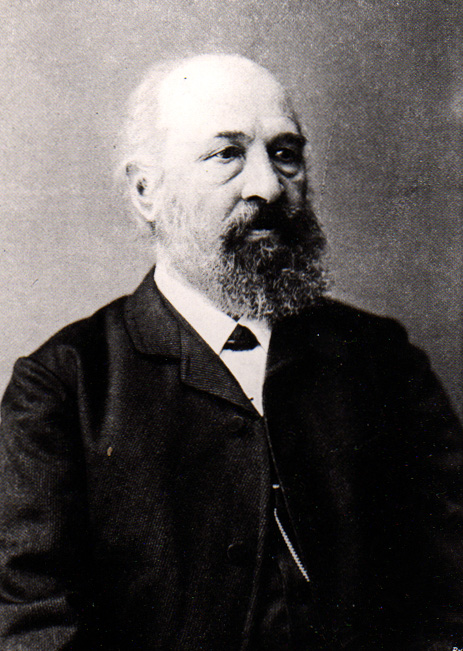
Hermann Hellriegel

- Karsten Greve (born 1946), an internationally renowned art dealer.
- Johannes Groenland (1824–1891), botanist and microscopist who worked for Vilmorin and was a professor of natural science in Dahme.
- Hermann Hellriegel (1831–1895), first head of the agricultural test station in Dahme from 1857 to 1873
- Max Jacob (1849–1921), architect
- Roswitha Krause (born 1949), swimmer and handball player
- Günther Marks (1897–1978), church musician and composer; lecturer for organ play and church music at the evangelical seminar in Dahme
- Otto Unverdorben (1806–1873), discoverer of the Aniline
- Birgit Vanderbeke (1956–2021), writer
