= Destiny Deacon =

Australian photographer (1957–2024)

Destiny Deacon HonFRPS
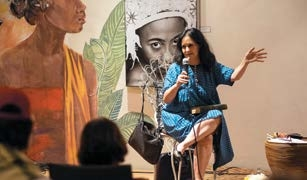
- Deacon, c. 2017
- Born: 6 February 1957; Maryborough, Queensland, Australia
- Died: 23 May 2024 (aged 68); Melbourne, Victoria, Australia
- Education: University of Melbourne (BA); La Trobe University
- Known for: Photography, video, installation, performance
- Mother: Eleanor Harding
- Awards: National Aboriginal & Torres Strait Islander Art Award (2009); Clemenger Contemporary Art Award (2009); Red Ochre Award (2022)

Destiny Deacon HonFRPS (6 February 1957 – 23 May 2024) was an Australian photographer, broadcaster, political activist and media artist. She exhibited photographs and films across Australia and also internationally, focusing on politics and exposing the disparagement around Australian Aboriginal cultures. She was credited with introducing the term "Blak" to refer to Aboriginal Australians and Torres Strait Islanders' contemporary art, culture and history.

== Early life ==
Deacon was born on 6 February 1957 in Maryborough, Queensland, and was of the Kuku Yalanji of Far North Queensland and Erub/Mer (Torres Strait Islander) peoples. She had 6 siblings, 4 from her mother's other relationship.

Deacon relocated to Port Melbourne in 1959 with her mother Eleanor Harding, who was then married to Destiny's father wharf labourer and unionist Warren Deacon. Soon after, Deacon's parents separated and she and her siblings were raised by her mother with the help of a close Indigenous community. Growing up, Deacon and her family lived in various Melbourne inner suburbs including commission housing, which influenced her world views greatly. She was a graduate of Mac.Robertson Girls' High School and her studio was at her house in Brunswick, Victoria.

Deacon's interest in photography started at a very early age. However, instead of pursuing photography, Deacon decided to attend university and study politics, a field that her mother had been very active within, being involved with the United Council of Aboriginal Women. After attending the University of Melbourne and completing a Bachelor of Arts program in politics and obtaining a Diploma in teaching from La Trobe University, Deacon moved on to first become a history teacher across various community and secondary schools around Victoria, and then to a tutor and lecturer in Australian Writing and Culture, and Aboriginal and Torres Strait Islander Cultural Production at the University of Melbourne.

It wasn't until 1990 after a stint on community radio for 3CR Melbourne that she decided to move into professional photography, after holding an exhibition with a few friends.

== Artistic development ==
Before her venture into professional photography, Deacon became involved with the Aboriginal activist Charles Perkins, working from Canberra as a staff trainer. Her strong interest in politics led her to become one of his "Angels", which was the beginning of her artistic endeavours.

Using what she had learnt about politics through Perkins, the "Angels", and her upbringing, Deacon started taking photographs of her culture using her trademark "black dollies" and other kitsch items as props to expose racism in Australia.

== Aesthetics ==
Deacon said in an interview published in the Biennale of Sydney in 2000: "Photography is [a] white people's invention. Lots of things seem really technical, for example the camera, the darkroom.. I've started taking the kind of pictures I do because I can't paint..and then I discovered it was a good way of expressing some feelings that lurk inside".

Deacon worked across a spectrum of different mediums including photography, video, installation and performance, but the one she was most noted for was her use of dolls to convey her message about the racism that exists within Australia. Deacon's photography polarised popular Anglo culture against Indigenous existence, creating satirical images, using Aboriginal imagery, found items, family members, and friends in very strange scenarios.

In the Oz (1998) series Deacon incorporated Koori kitsch dolls and showed the construction of identity is an old game that she could play too. Using The Wizard of Oz as a starting point for her re-presentation of Aboriginal culture and identity, she recognised the fictionalising of history, identity and nationhood in Australia's past – a reminder that things are not always as they appear, nor what we have been made to believe; that history is written much similar to a story.

Deacon coined the term "Blak" as a reference to Indigenous Australian culture in 1991, in the series Blak lik mi, which was exhibited in 'Lisa Bellear, Brenda Croft and Destiny Deacon: Kudjeris' at the Boomalli Aboriginal Artists Cooperative from 13 November to 4 December 1991. The phrase referenced the 1961 book Black Like Me by white American journalist John Howard Griffin, detailing his 1959–60 journey through the US Deep South disguised as African American during a time of racial segregation. The title of his book was taken from African American author Langston Hughes poem Dream Variations. Deacon stated that she removed the 'c' from 'black' in resistance to the slur "black cunt", which she had heard shouted at her growing up.

It is also suggested that Deacon was using a term possibly appropriated from American hip hop or rap, the intention behind it was that it "reclaim[ed] historical, representational, symbolical, stereotypical and romanticised notions of Black or Blackness", and expressed taking back power and control within a society that does not give its Indigenous peoples much opportunity for self-determination as individuals and communities. Deacon herself said that it was "taking on the 'colonisers' language and flipping it on its head", as an expression of authentic urban Aboriginal identity.

Where's Mickey? (2003) shows the large difference between how Indigenous people are perceived by the white Australian population and the reality of her family and friends' lives. Deacon said about her work that the "Humour cuts deep. I like to think that there's a laugh and a tear in each".

== Work and exhibitions ==
An early video work was "Home video" (1987). Deacon's first show, "Pitcha Mi Koori", was a part of the Melbourne Fringe Festival, and in 1991, her work was included in Aboriginal Women's Exhibition, at the Art Gallery of New South Wales. Her first solo exhibition, Caste Offs, was held in 1993 at the Australian Centre for Photography in Sydney. Deacon's work began to be included in group exhibitions in 1994, including Blakness: Blak City Culture! at the Australian Centre for Contemporary Art in Melbourne, True Colours: Aboriginal and Torres Strait Islander Artists Raise the Flag at Bluecoat Gallery, Liverpool; South London Gallery; City Gallery, Leicester and in Australia. "Welcome to My Koori World" (video, 1992) was shown at the Museum of Modern Art in a show titled An Eccentric Orbit: Video Art in Australia, which was also picked up by ABC Television for the Blackout series.

In 1998, Deacon explored her mother's life by photographing her family in the Torres Strait Islands after her death two years earlier, documenting it in a show titled "Postcards from Mummy". This journey "allowed her to come to terms with the loss of her mother and the importance of history, memory and place to identify".

Deacon was the director of the Salzburg International Summer Academy of Fine Arts in 2010. She was a staff member of the RMIT School of Art from 1999 to 2012.

Deacon's work was featured in numerous local and international exhibitions such as Perspecta (1993, 1999), Havana Biennial (1994), Johannesburg Biennale (1995), Asia-Pacific Triennial of Contemporary Art (1996), Melbourne International Biennial (1999), Biennale of Sydney (2000), Yokohama Triennale (2001), Das Lied von der Erde by Peter George d'Angelino Tap (2001), Documenta 11 (2002), the Salzburger Kunstverein (2004) and most recently the Sharjah Biennial (2023).

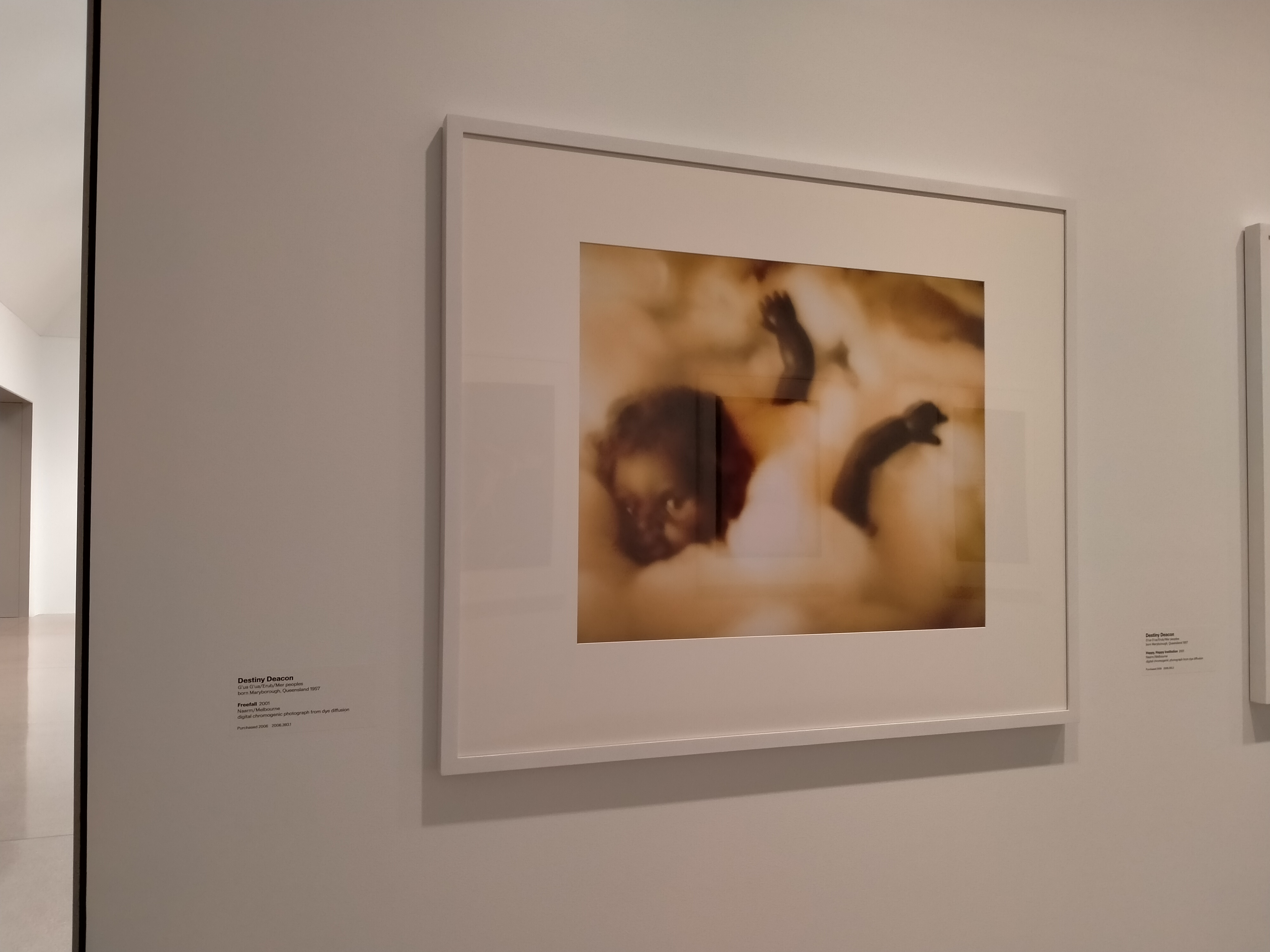
Freefall (2001) by Deacon at the National Gallery of Australia in 2023

Walk & don't look blak was Deacon's first large retrospective held at the Museum of Contemporary Art Australia, in 2004, encompassing the past 14 years of her work and practice. From there it toured the Ian Potter Museum of Art at the University of Melbourne, the Adam Art Gallery and the City Gallery Wellington, the Jean-Marie Tjibaou Cultural Centre in Noumea, New Caledonia, and the Tokyo Photographic Art Museum. For 2004: Australian Culture Now at the ACMI in Melbourne, Deacon was commissioned to make a film for the programme Neighbours (the remix).

In 2020, the National Gallery of Victoria mounted a retrospective exhibition of her work, the first in 15 years, curated by Indigenous curator Myles Russell-Cook, called DESTINY. Scheduled to run from 27 March to 9 August 2020, the opening of the gallery was delayed due to the COVID-19 pandemic in Australia. Russell-Cook also edited the mammoth Destiny, a monograph celebrating her art and life.

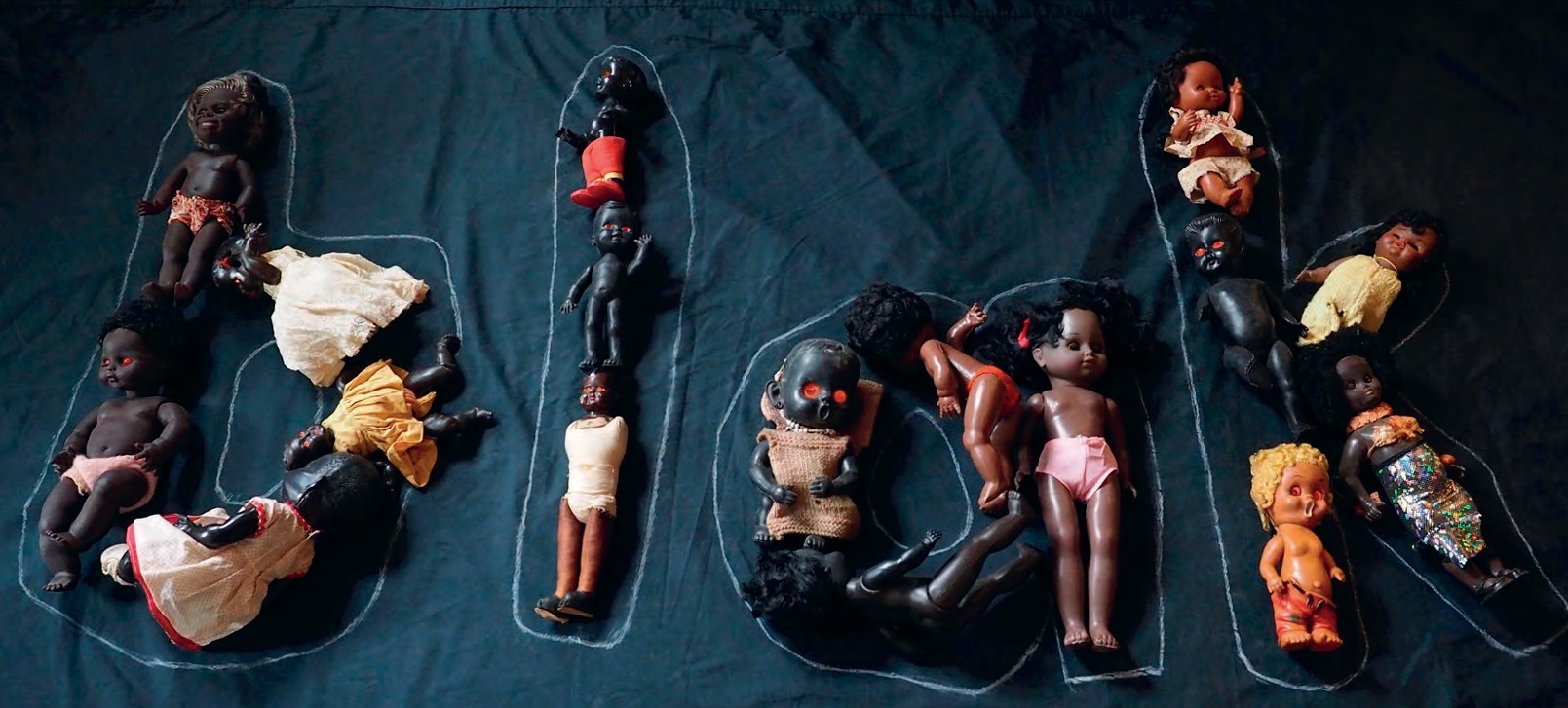
A Deacon photograph taken c. 2022 for exhibition at the Embassy of Australia, Paris in 2022

In 2009, she was awarded the Visual Artist of the Year Award by The Deadlys in 2009. She was also awarded the National Aboriginal & Torres Strait Islander Art Award that year. In September 2009, Deacon was awarded the Clemenger Contemporary Art Award. In 2019, she received an honorary doctorate in education from La Trobe University. In 2022, Destiny Deacon was awarded the Centenary Medal and Honorary Fellowship of the Royal Photographic Society. She was also awarded the Red Ochre Award in May that year, along with Stephen Page. Deacon was awarded the Prix HSBC pour la photographie by the Musée du Quai Branly – Jacques Chirac in 2023.

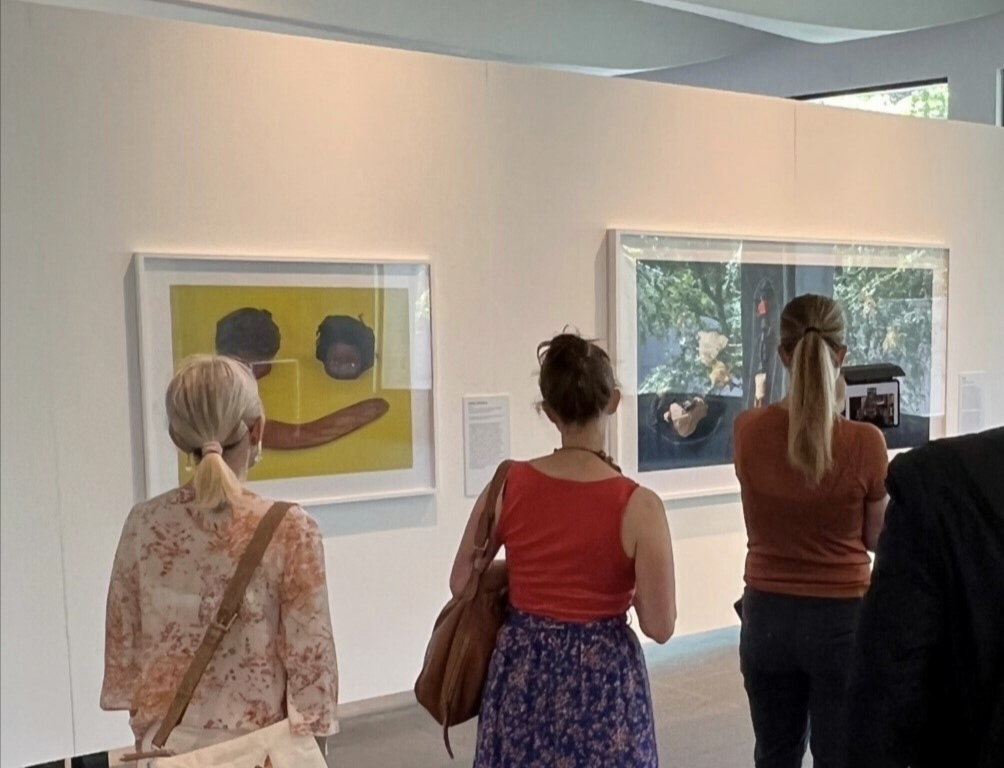
Deacon photographs at a museum in 2022. The one on the left is Smile (2017) and the one on the right is the one in this article above.

In June 2024, Destiny Deacon work Arrears Window was featured on a "First Peoples Melbourne Art Tram", presented as part of the RISING: festival in Melbourne.

== Personal life and death ==
Deacon came out as lesbian in the 1970s.

She died after a long illness in Melbourne on 23 May 2024, aged 67. According to The Guardian, Deacon had "faced significant health challenges over the past three years" by May 2022.

== Bibliography ==
- Deacon, Destiny; Croft, Brenda L.; Bellear, Lisa; Delaney, Max; Fraser, Virginia; Kruger, Kim; Liddle, Celeste; Green, Nellie; Tibby, Ardy; Mosby, Tom (21 May 2016). Close to You: Photos from an Activist's Archive: the Lisa Bellear Picture Show. Melbourne: Koorie Heritage Trust. ISBN 9780994570802, 0994570805 OCLC 954720073
- Deacon, Destiny (November 2004). Walk and Don't Look Blak: Resource Kit. The Rocks, NSW: Museum of Contemporary Art – via AIATSIS Collections.
- Deacon, Destiny (2004). Walk and Don't Look Blak. The Rocks, NSW: Museum of Contemporary Art. ISBN 1875632972, 9781875632978 ARK 13960/t53g4590j
- Deacon, Destiny; Croft, Brenda L. (1999). In My Father's House/Postcards from Mummy. Paddington, NSW: Australian Centre for Photography. ISBN 9780909339135, 0909339139
- Deacon, Destiny (1994). My Boomerang Won't Come Back. Adelaide: Contemporary Art Centre of South Australia. ISBN 9781875751099, 1875751092
