= Galerie Karsten Greve =

Set of European art galleries

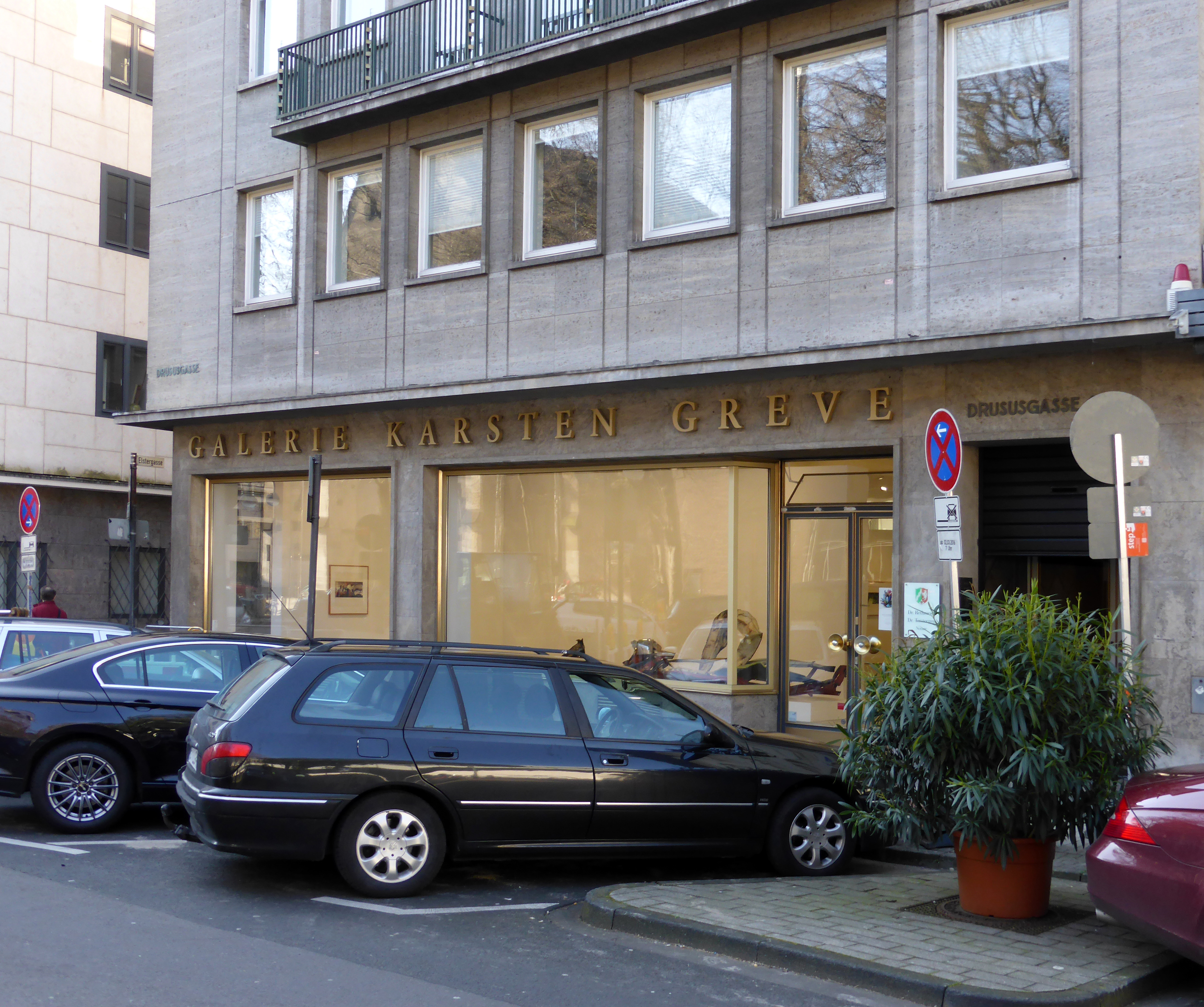
Galerie Karsten Greve in Cologne

Galerie Karsten Greve is a set of European art galleries established by Karsten Greve that operates art exhibit spaces in Cologne (Germany), St. Moritz (Switzerland), and Paris (France). It specializes in postwar and contemporary art, representing around fifty artists. The gallery's programme is characterized by the international postwar avant-garde, but also includes photographers and Chinese contemporary artists, as well as other international young artists. The gallery publishes catalogue editions to accompany exhibitions as well as monographs and catalogues raisonneés.

== History ==
Galerie Karsten Greve is owned and run by German art dealer and publisher Karsten Greve, who founded the original gallery in 1972 in Cologne, Germany. In 1989, Karsten Greve opened a second space in Paris, in 1994 a third location in Milan (closed 2002) and another in 1999 in St. Moritz.

=== Cologne ===
In 1970, Karsten Greve, together with Rolf Möllenhof (born 1939, Chemnitz), directed the Möllenhof/Greve Galerie. He founded his first own gallery in 1972 in its original Cologne Lindenstraße 20 Galeriehaus location, debuting with an Yves Klein solo exhibition of his Anthropometry series. In the same year, Galerie Karsten Greve presented at Art Basel for the first time. In 1973 Karsten Greve became the sole proprietor of Galerie Karsten Greve. In 1980 the gallery moved into the former space of Aenne Abels at Wallrafplatz 3 exhibiting Cy Twombly (1982), Lucio Fontana (1982 and 1983) and Willem de Kooning (1990) among others. The gallery expanded to what used to be Rudolf Zwirner's Albertusstraße 18 gallery space in 1992, designed by architect Erich Schneider-Wessling. The space was inaugurated with a John Chamberlain solo show, followed by Josef Albers (1996 and 1998), Cy Twombly (1997), Wols (1998), Louise Bourgeois (1999) and Jannis Kounellis (1999) exhibitions. Galerie Karsten Greve Cologne later moved to its main location, Drususgasse 1-5, in 2000. The lower floors of the 1950s landmark building, located in the centre of Cologne, were remodeled by French architect Yannis Tsiomis. The gallery still maintains its Wallrafplatz exhibition space to this day.

=== Paris ===
In 1989, Galerie Karsten Greve opened its Rue Debelleyme exhibition space in the Marais district of Paris, near the Musée Picasso. Since then the area has become a popular location for galleries and has undergone extensive redevelopments. The gallery space, situated in a 17th-century palais, built around a cour d’honneur, consists of a large main gallery and another smaller, three-storey exhibition space. Architect Yannis Tsiomis was responsible for remodeling the entire interior of the property.

In 2003, Galerie Karsten Greve Paris presented Pierre Soulages in a solo exhibition. Galerie Karsten Greve represents Pierre Soulages in France.

=== Milan ===
In 1994, Karsten Greve opened a third gallery space in the Via Santo Spirito in Milan in the historical city centre near Via Montenapoleone, dedicating the first show to Cy Twombly. Among the artists exhibited were Piero Manzoni, Lucio Fontana, Alberto Burri, Nicola de Maria, Osvaldo Licini, Francesco Lo Savio. and Mario Nigro. The space was closed in 2002.

=== St. Moritz ===
In 1999, Karsten Greve opened his fourth gallery space at Via Maistra 4 in St. Moritz, Switzerland, as one of the first in the region. The former Posthaus Hotel in which the gallery is located, was redesigned by British architect Norman Foster. Unlike other galleries in Engadin, it hosts exhibitions throughout most of the year.

== Significance in the art world ==
The gallery achieved its reputation through its curated presentations at art fairs and museum quality exhibitions. Karsten Greve's longstanding friendships with many represented artists such as Cy Twombly, Louise Bourgeois, John Chamberlain, Jannis Kounellis, Pierre Soulages and Gotthard Graubner provided the basis for the gallery's programme. Galerie Karsten Greve contributed strongly to the international recognition of many of its represented artists. The gallery's main focus lies in major renewal movements present in the international art world after 1945, which provided the impetus for the continuation of revolutionary Modernism emerging after the turn of the century. The gallery stages solo and group exhibitions in its own exhibition spaces and also in collaboration with major international museums and other non-commercial art institutions, working closely with the Centre Pompidou in Paris, the Guggenheim Museum in New York, the Nasher Sculpture Center in Dallas, the Fondation Beyeler and the Kunstmuseum Basel among others by contributing works as loans. Important exhibitions the gallery contributed to include the 2008/2009 Cy Twombly show at the Guggenheim Bilbao, the 1987 Cy Twombly retrospective at the Kunsthaus Zürich, which later traveled to Madrid and London, the Louise Bourgeois retrospective at the Tate, Centre Pompidou and Guggenheim New York (2007/2008) and at the Napoli Museo di Capodimonte (2008/2009), the Musee d’Art Moderne de la Ville de Paris Lucio Fontana retrospective (2014) as well as numerous other exhibitions in museums in Zürich, Düsseldorf and Madrid. The gallery also acts as a consultant for private and corporate collections with works found in the Langen Foundation, Museum Frieder Burda, Museum Insel Hombroich, Broad Art Foundation, Fondation d’Art Contemporain Daniel et Florence Guerlain, Fondation Louis Vuitton, La Maison Rouge and Fondazione Prada.

Galerie Karsten Greve participates in the international art fair circuit, with annual presentations at Art Basel fairs in Basel, Hong Kong and Miami Beach, FIAC Paris, TEFAF Maastricht, TEFAF New York Spring and Art Cologne.

== Artists ==
Josef Albers	Lynn Davis	David Malin	Gideon Rubin
Eugène Atget	Willem de Kooning	Sally Mann	Georgia Russell
Ilse Bing	Ding Yi	Piero Manzoni	Joel Shapiro
Pierrette Bloch	Jean Dubuffet	Fausto Melotti	Pierre Soulages
Louise Bourgeois	Lucio Fontana	Henri Michaux	Louis Soutter
Brassaϊ	Gotthard Graubner	Claire Morgan	Cy Twombly
Thomas Brummett	Leiko Ikemura	Manish Nai	Luise Unger
Alexander Calder	Raúl Illarramendi	Mario Nigro	Sergio Vega
Lawrence Carroll	Mimmo Jodice	Robert Polidori	Wols
John Chamberlain	Yiorgos Kordakis	Norbert Prangenberg
Joseph Cornell	Catherine Lee	Qiu Shihua

== Publishing ==
Galerie Karsten Greve publishes catalogue editions to accompany its exhibitions as well as monographs and catalogues raisonneés. 40 YEARS. 20 YEARS. 10 YEARS GALERIE KARSTEN GREVE COLOGNE. PARIS. ST. MORITZ, published in 2010, documents the gallery's history since its founding. Highlights from the gallery's publishing activities include the following titles produced: BRASSAÏ – DUBUFFET (2011), Joseph Cornell, (1992) including texts from Joseph Cornell's journals, Louis Soutter, Finger-paintings 1937-1942, (1998), with texts by Jean Dubuffet, Lucio Fontana, Sculpture/Skulptur, lo sono uno scultore e non un ceramista, Catalogue III (2012) and Cy Twombly, Work on Paper, Catalogue VI (2013).

The gallery has a social media presence.
