= Javier Molins =

Spanish art curator

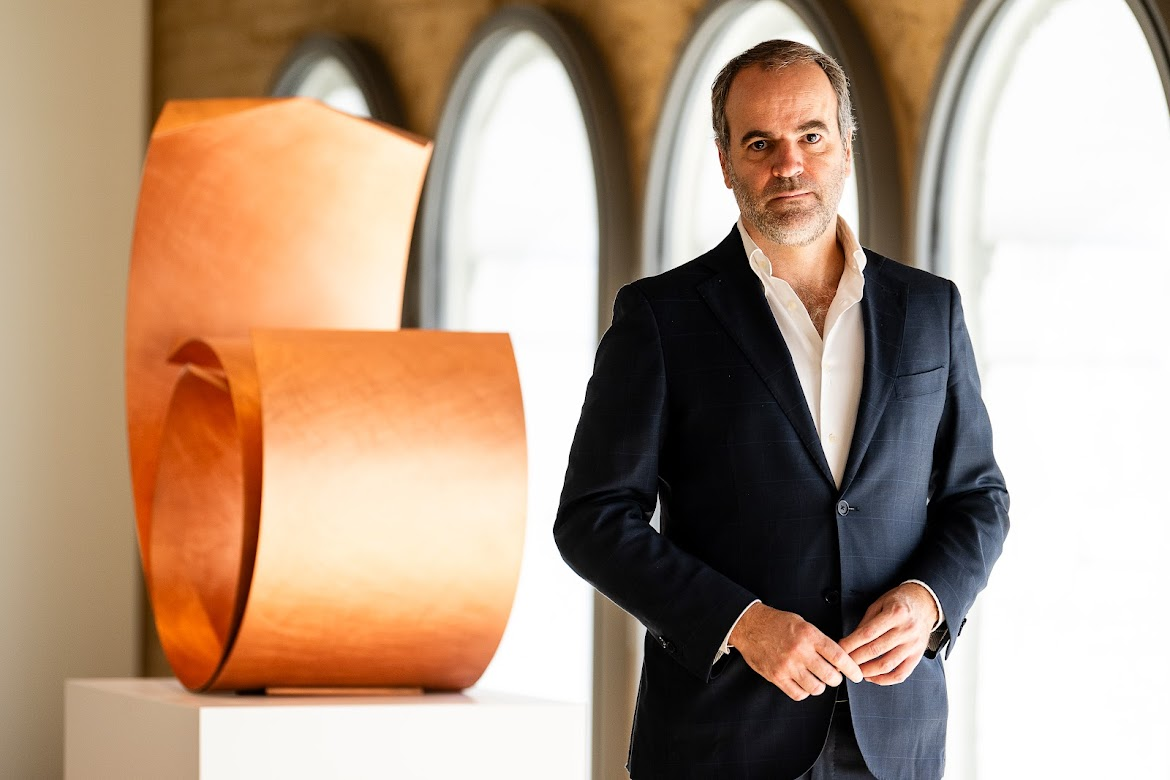
Javier Molins

Javier Molins is a Spanish international contemporary art curator and writer. He is the artistic advisor to Hortensia Herrero and a regular contributor in the Spanish media on art and culture.

== Career ==
Javier Molins started working with Hortensia Herrero in 2013. Together they have been building a collection of Modern and Contemporary Art with the aim of opening a private museum in central Valencia, Spain. On 11 November 2023, the Centro Arte Hortensia Herrero was inaugurated featuring the works by over 50 artists including Anselm Kiefer and George Baselitz. Molins invited six artists to respond to the architecture of the building and create site-specific works of art including Sean Scully, Jaume Plensa, Mat Collishaw, Cristina Inglesias, Tomás Saraceno and Olafur Eliasson.

Molins has curated exhibitions for art galleries and museums in Spain, the UK, Italy, Dubai and Singapore. He has written exhibition catalogues on a number of modern and contemporary artists including Pablo Picasso, Sean Scully, Manolo Valdés and Jaume Plensa. He served as Director of Communication and Development of the Institut Valencià d'Art Modern under the direction of Kosme de Barañano from 2001 to 2004, and was Director of Marlborough Gallery Madrid from 2005 to 2006. In 2011, his documentary film Valdes as Pretext was selected by Spain's Ministry of Culture for the Marché du Film of the Cannes Film Festival. In 2019 his book Artistas en Los Campos Nazis (Artists in the Nazi Camps) was awarded third prize in the Spanish Culture Ministry's annual book awards.

In 2019, Molins curated an exhibition titled HUMAN for Sean Scully in the church of San Giorgio Maggiore during the Venice Biennale, which featured a felt sculpture of 10.4m in height and an illuminated manuscript created especially for the exhibition.

In 2021, Molins was invited back to Venice to curate Ugo Rondinone's exhibition at the Scuola Grande di San Giovannie Evangelista. The exhibition was titled BURN SHINE FLY and featured sculptures in the courtyard, church and exhibition hall. Notably, one of the sculptures was a portrait of Roger Federer and was the subject of a documentary produced by Credit Swiss titled Portrait of a Champion. Roger Federer and Ugo Rondinone.

== Journalism ==
Molins is a contributing writer for the Spanish language current affairs magazine Cambio 16 and a cultural critic for ABC (newspaper). He is a regular contributor to White Paper By.
