= Susan Philipsz =

Scottish sculptor and sound artist (born 1965)

- Born: Susan Mary Philipsz; 1965 (age 60–61); Maryhill, Glasgow, Scotland
- Education: Duncan of Jordanstone College of Art; University of Ulster
- Spouse: Eoghan McTigue
- Awards: Turner Prize
- Patrons: MoMA PS1

Susan Mary Philipsz OBE (born 1965) is a Scottish artist who won the 2010 Turner Prize. Originally a sculptor, she is best known for her sound installations. She records herself singing a cappella versions of songs which are replayed over a public address system in the gallery or other installation. She currently lives and works in Berlin.

== Early life and education ==
Philipsz was born in Maryhill, Glasgow, one of six siblings. Philipsz's father is half-Burmese and grew up in Burma as a child. His family's life was "pulled apart by the war", and he came to the UK in his twenties. In her youth, Philipsz sang in the local Catholic church choir with her sisters where she learned to harmonize.

From 1989 to 1993, she studied sculpture at Duncan of Jordanstone College of Art in Dundee. She later earned a master's degree in Fine Arts (MFA) degree from the University of Ulster, where she studied from 1993 to 1994.

From 2000 to 2001, she was a Studio Artist Resident at MoMA PS1. She was the Director of Catalyst Arts in Belfast for several years. Philipsz is married to Irish photographer Eoghan McTigue.

== Work ==
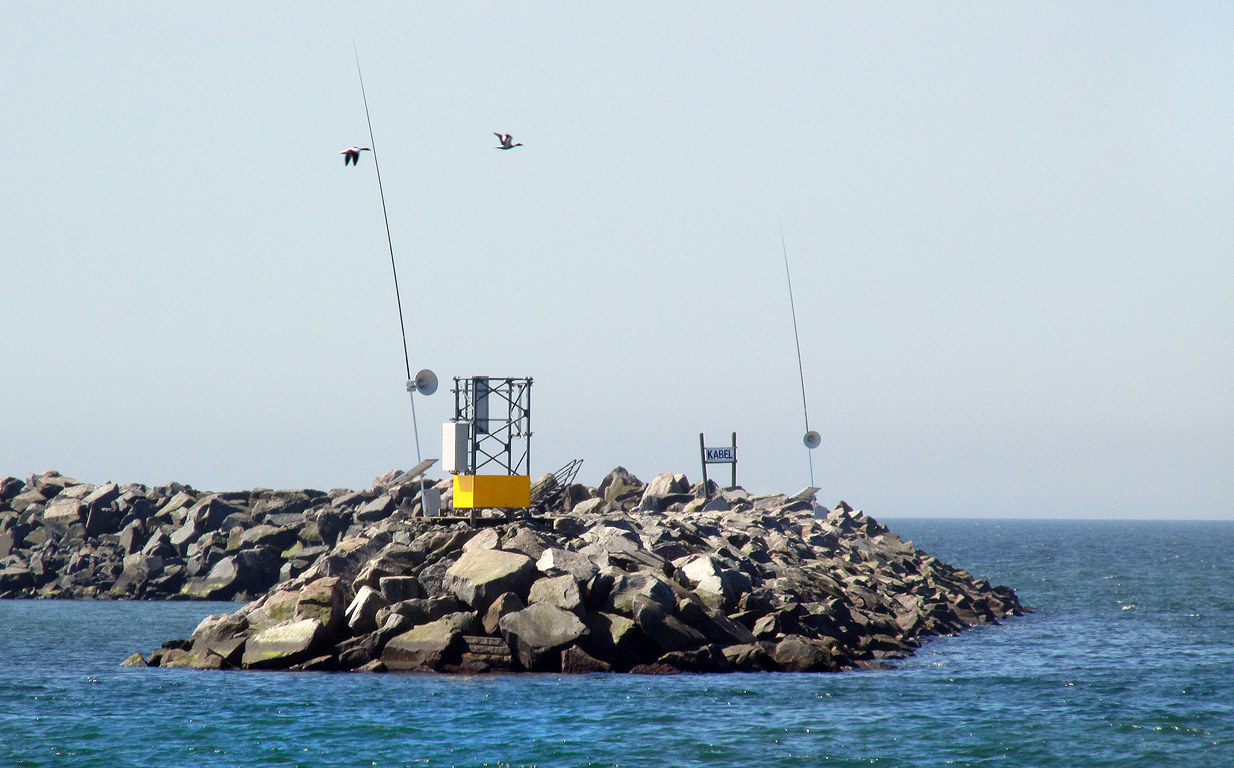
The loudspeakers on the west breakwater at the entrance to Ystad harbour, for Susan Philipsz's sound installation "The Distant Sound"

Susan Philipsz - The Distant Sound. Ystad 25 May 2014.

Philipsz predominantly creates sound installations using recordings of her own voice that are played in specific geographical sites to "heighten the visitor's engagement with their surroundings while inspiring thoughtful introspection." Although Philipsz sings many of her works, it is a key element of her work that she has an untrained, average voice. Philipsz cannot read or write sheet music. She said: "Everyone can identify with a human voice. I think hearing an unaccompanied voice, especially an untrained one, even if it's singing a song you don't know, can trigger some really powerful memories and associations. If I'd gone to music school and had proper training, I would not be doing what I do today."

Her 1998 work "Filter", consisting of versions of songs by Nirvana, Marianne Faithfull, Radiohead and The Velvet Underground, has been played at a bus station and at a Tesco supermarket.

Her 1999 work "The Internationale" consists of a solo a cappella version of the revolutionary song. She sings the Irish ballad "The Lass of Aughrim" in her 2000 work, The Dead.

In her 2003 work, "Sunset Song", she sings the male and female parts of the 19th-century American folk ballad "Banks of the Ohio", with the volume level changing according to light levels. She used a vibraphone for her 2009 piece, "You are not alone", commissioned for the Radcliffe Observatory in Oxford.

In 2010, she was commissioned by the Glasgow International Festival. Her piece, "Lowlands", was three versions of what she called a 16th-century Scottish lament, "Lowlands Away". It was played under three bridges over the River Clyde in Glasgow - George V Bridge, the Caledonian Railway Bridge, and Glasgow Bridge. "Lowlands", was subsequently exhibited at Tate Britain, winning her the 2010 Turner Prize.

Developed for documenta, Study for Strings (2012) riffs on an orchestral piece composed in 1943 at the Theresienstadt concentration camp for musicians there. For her recording, Philipsz left out the parts for all the instruments except one cello and one viola, leaving plangent silences between those two players' scattered notes.

== Exhibitions ==
Philipsz has exhibited at the Melbourne International Biennial 1999, Manifesta 3 in Ljubljana in 2000, the Tirana Biennial in 2001, at Triennal of British Art at Tate Britain in 2003, the 16th Biennale of Sydney in 2008, and at the 55th Carnegie International in 2009. She gave a solo exhibition at the Institute of Contemporary Arts in 2008.

She was commissioned to create a work for the rotunda at the Solomon R. Guggenheim Museum in New York City in 2010.

In 2011, Philipsz was commissioned by the Museum of Contemporary Art, Chicago to create a sound installation. This piece titled We Shall Be All draws from Chicago's labor history, specifically the 1886 Haymarket Affair and the Industrial Workers of the World (IWW), also known as the Wobblies. Part of her 2011 exhibition at the MCA was a presentation of her work The Internationale in the building's atrium. In addition to her MCA exhibition, she presented her 2002 work Pledge at the Jane Addams Hull House Museum, located on the University of Illinois at Chicago campus.

In 2013 Philipsz was included in Soundings: A Contemporary Score, the first-ever major exhibition of sound art at the Museum of Modern Art in New York City. In 2016, her work, "Part File Score" was exhibited at the Hirshhorn Museum.

== Recognition ==
In 2003, Philipsz was nominated for the Beck's Futures award. In 2010, she won the prestigious Turner Prize for a sound installation that features her singing three versions of a Scottish lament. She received the £25,000 prize at a ceremony at Tate Britain that was disrupted by protests over the British Government's educational cuts. She was shortlisted for a Glenfiddich Spirit of Scotland Award that same year.

=== Honours ===
She was appointed Officer of the Order of the British Empire (OBE) in the 2014 New Year Honours for services to British art.

== See also ==
- Sound art
- List of sound artists
