= Eleanor Harding =

Australian Aboriginal activist (1934–1996)

- Born: Eleanor Nain; 24 June 1934; Erub Island, Torres Strait Islands, Australia
- Died: 14 June 1996 (aged 61); Melbourne, Australia
- Other names: Eleanor Deacon, Eleanor Petersen
- Occupation: Aboriginal activist
- Children: 7, including Destiny Deacon

Eleanor Harding (née Nain; 24 June 1934 – 14 June 1996) was an Indigenous Australian from the Torres Strait Islands who worked to attain civil rights for Aboriginal Australians. She advocated for women's rights and adequate educational opportunities, as well, serving with numerous organizations to attain equality for indigenous people. In 2012, she was inducted into the Victorian Aboriginal Honour Roll by the State of Victoria.

== Early life ==
Eleanor Nain was born on 24 June 1934 on Erub Island of the Torres Strait Islands in Australia. Her mother, Emma Pitt was of the Meriam Mer people in the Torres Straits and her father Fred Nain, from Cape York, Queensland was from the Kuku peoples. When she was eight years old, her father was killed while working on a pearling lugger and a few years later she was orphaned when her mother died. Her mother's mother, Annai Pitt, brought her from Erub Island to the mainland, where they first lived in Cairns and later moved to Bloomfield, Queensland. By the time she was thirteen, Nain was working as a kitchen helper at Lake Eacham Hotel to earn her own living. The discriminatory laws of Queensland toward aboriginal people were some of the harshest in Australia.

In 1956, hoping to find less discrimination, Nain moved to the South Yarra suburb of Melbourne and after a brief time, to the Fitzroy suburban area. She had seven children with three partners: Deborah Deacon, Destiny Deacon, Kerry Deacon, Johnny Harding, Janina Harding, Clinton Petersen (who uses the professional name Clinton Nain, in his visual arts work), and Tommy Petersen, taking the surname of Jack Harding, a white wharf labourer from the Maroubra suburb of Sydney. The community was close-knit, and Harding soon was taking part in a network of neighbors helping each other, visiting prisons, and performing other social services to improve their living conditions. In the 1960s, she joined the Aborigines Advancement League and the local branch of the Federal Council for the Advancement of Aborigines and Torres Strait Islanders (FCAATSI) to push for civil rights and equality for Indigenous Australians.

Harding was one of the activists who pressed for and achieved the passage of the Aboriginal Australian Referendum of 1967, which amended the Constitution of Australia, which laid the groundwork for later more significant legislation for indigenous rights. As a member of the executive of the National Aboriginal and Islander Women's Council, she took part in women's issues, as well as several protests to focus attention on the problems which colonialism had brought to women and indigenous people. Throughout the 1970s, she worked with victims of domestic violence. In spite of her limited schooling, Harding encouraged all of her children to seek higher education. She supported the Abschol movement which began as a scheme to provide scholarships for Aboriginal students. In addition, she served on the boards of the Victorian Aboriginal Legal Service and the Victorian Aboriginal Health Service. Into the 1980s, Harding remained active. In 1983, she and other women established the Margaret Tucker Hostel to give young, homeless, Aboriginal women safe housing.

Harding died on 14 June 1996, in Melbourne and was returned to Darnley Island for burial. Posthumously, an award, named in her honor, "The Aunty Eleanor Harding Memorial Award" is granted annually since 1999 by the Indigenous Performing Arts Alliance of Victoria to an emerging talent. In 2002, a pictorial tribute created by Harding's daughter Destiny Deacon, entitled Postcards from Mummy was shown at Documenta 11, in Kassel, Germany. The exhibition later was shown in Australia. In 2012, Harding was inducted into the Victorian Aboriginal Honour Roll by the State of Victoria.
