= Claire Morgan =

Irish artist (born 1980)

- Born: 17 August 1980 (age 46); Belfast, Northern Ireland
- Education: University of Northumbria; University of Ulster
- Known for: Visual Artist

Claire Morgan (born 17 August 1980 in Belfast, Northern Ireland) is an Irish artist. She lives and works in North East England.

== Biography ==
Morgan was born in Belfast, Northern Ireland. She studied at Northumbria University in Newcastle upon Tyne, graduating with a BA Hons in Fine Art Sculpture in 2003.

Her work is inspired by the cycles of nature and the problematic relationships between humans and nature, as well as personal experiences and memories of trauma.

Morgan started out working with temporary materials such as rotting fruit and other organic materials. She is known for suspended installations that often include taxidermy, and also for intricate works on paper.

== Selected solo exhibitions ==
- 2021 – Claire Morgan: Joy in the pain, Saarlandmuseum Moderne Galerie, Saarbrücken, Germany
- 2019 – Claire Morgan: As I Live and Breathe, The Horniman Museum and Gardens, London, UK
- 2018 – Claire Morgan: Losses, Deyrolle, Paris, France
- 2018 – Claire Morgan: Here is the End of All Things, Kunstverein Emsdetten, Germany
- 2018 – Claire Morgan: Recent Lapses in Judgement, Galerie Karsten Greve, Köln, Germany
- 2017 – Claire Morgan: My God-shaped Hole, Fondation Francès, Senlis, France
- 2017 – Claire Morgan: Stop Me Feeling, Frist Art Museum, Nashville, US
- 2016 – Claire Morgan: The Sound of Silence, Het Noordbrabants Museum, Den Bosch, Netherlands
- 2016 – Claire Morgan: Plenty More Fish In The Sea, Musée Jean-Lurçat et de la Tapisserie contemporaine, Angers
- 2015 – Claire Morgan: The Gathering Dusk, Musée de la Chasse et de la Nature, France
- 2014 – Claire Morgan: Try Again. Fail Again. Fail Better. Osthaus Museum, Hagen, Germany
- 2015 – Claire Morgan: Try Again. Fail Again. Fail Better. Stadtmuseum Jena, Jena, Germany
- 2015 – Claire Morgan: Try Again. Fail Again. Fail Better. Fondation Fernet Branca, Saint-Louis, France
- 2015 – Claire Morgan: Act of God // Höhere Gewalt, Kunst-Station Sankt Peter, Köln, Germany
- 2013 – Claire Morgan: Interference, Nässjö Konsthall, Sweden
- 2013 – Claire Morgan: Arresting, Växjö konsthall, Sweden
- 2012 – Claire Morgan: Gone to Seed, MAC, Belfast, Northern Ireland
- 2012 – Claire Morgan: Quietus, Galerie Karsten Greve, Paris, France
- 2012 – Claire Morgan: Menagerie, Kunstverein Münsterland, Coesfeld, Germany
- 2011 – Claire Morgan: About Time, Hub: National Centre for Craft and Design, Sleaford, UK
- 2010 – Claire Morgan: Life. Blood, Galerie Karsten Greve, Paris, France
- 2008 – Claire Morgan: Gone with the Wind, Great North Run Cultural Programme, Laing Art Gallery, Newcastle, UK
- 2008 – Claire Morgan: Chasing Rainbows, Selfridges (Wonder Room Windows), London, UK

== Awards ==
- 2019 – Fondation Daniel et Florence Guerlain, Prix de Dessin 2019 FR
- 2007 – Wooda Arts Award, Cornwall UK
- 2006 – Premio Fondazione Arnaldo Pomodoro, Prize for Young Sculptors, Milan IT
- 2004 – Roy Noakes Award, selected by Royal British Society of Sculptors UK
- 2004 – Royal British Society of Sculptors, Annual Bursary Award UK

== Selected collections ==
- Centre Georges Pompidou
- MONA Museum of Old and New Art
- Fondation Guerlain
- Emerige
- ALTANA Kulturstiftung
- Renschdael Art Foundation
- Fondation Frances
- Ghisla Art Foundation
- ERES Foundation
- EIB Institute
