= Gideon Rubin =

Israeli-British artist (born 1973)

Gideon Rubin גידיון רובין
- Born: June 22, 1973; Tel Aviv, Israel
- Education: School of Visual Arts; Slade School of Fine Arts
- Known for: Painting
- Spouse: Silia Ka Tung
- Website: www.gideonrubin.com

Gideon Rubin (Hebrew: גידיון רובין; born 1973) is an Israeli-British artist who works with themes such as childhood, family, and memory.

The grandson of the Israeli painter Reuven Rubin, and the son of diplomat David Rubin and curator of The Rubin Museum since 1983, Carmela Rubin, Rubin was greatly influenced by art and culture growing up. He has made abstracted and faceless portraits, which are inspired by images from old photo albums, paparazzi shots of celebrities, and paintings by old masters.

Rubin has had numerous international one-man shows. He lives and works in London and has 3 children.

== Education ==
- 2002: MFA, Slade School of Fine Art, University College, London
- 1999: BFA, School of Visual Arts, New York

== Selected Collections ==
Gideon Rubin has work in prestigious private collections all over the world. Notable public collections include: Museum Voorlinden Collection, The Netherlands; Herzliya Museum for Contemporary Art, Israel; McEvoy Foundation for the Arts, San Francisco; Rubin Museum, Israel; Collezione Maramotti, Italy; The Collezione Fondazione San Patrignano, Italy; Collezione Associazione Genesi, Italy; Fondation Frances, France; Park Seobo Foundation, South Korea.

== Exhibitions ==
Recent solo exhibitions include: A Summer’s Tale, K11 Art Foundation, Shanghai, Looking Away, Galerie Karsten Greve Cologne; 13, Galleria Monica De Cardenas, Milan; Red Boys and Green Girls, Hosfelt Gallery, San Francisco; Black Book at The Freud Museum,; If This Not Be I at Alon Segev Gallery, Tel Aviv; Memory Goes as Far as This Morning at the Museum of Contemporary Art Chengdu, China and the San Jose Institute of Contemporary Art, California.

Selected two person and group exhibitions include: Living Memory: Louise Bourgeois, Nicolas Godin and Gideon Rubin, All Saint’s Chapel, London; No-One's Rose, Fox Jensen Gallery, Sydney; Duncan Hannah / Gideon Rubin, Alon Segev Gallery, Tel Aviv; How to Travel in Time at Apexart, New York;[13] Water, Heart, Face at Jerusalem Biennale 2017; Mirror Mirror at Hosfelt Gallery, San Francisco; Reflections: Human/Nature, Gana Art Centre, Seoul; John Moores Painting Prize 2014, Walker Art Gallery, Liverpool; Summer Show at the Royal Academy of Arts, London; To Have a Voice at the Mackintosh Museum, Glasgow School of Art, Glasgow; No New Thing Under the Sun at the Royal Academy of Arts, London.

== Publications ==
- Gideon Rubin, Look Again, monograph with texts by Jennifer Higgie, Park Joon, Matthew Holman, Varda Caivano. Anomie Publishing, 2023, ISBN 978-1-910221-52-5
- Gideon Rubin, monograph with texts by Gabriel Coxhead, Martin Herbert, Aya Lurie, Sarah Suzuki (Art/Books, July 2015 ISBN 978-1-908970-20-6)
- Black Book by Gideon Rubin (Freud Museum London, 2018)
- Gideon Rubin (Rokeby, 2007, ISBN 0-9550501-4-6)
- Gideon Rubin, Others (Galerie Karsten Greve, Paris, 2010, ISBN 978-3-940824-44-8)
