= Robert Polidori =

Canadian-American photographer (born 1951)

- Born: February 10, 1951 (age 75); Montreal, Quebec, Canada
- Known for: Photographic Artist

Robert Polidori (born February 10, 1951) is a Canadian-American photographer known for his large-scale color images of architecture, urban environments and interiors. His work has been the subject of solo exhibitions at the Metropolitan Museum of Art (New York), Musée d'art contemporain de Montréal, Martin-Gropius-Bau museum (Berlin), and Moreira Salles Institute (São Paulo and Rio de Janeiro). His photographs are also included in the collections of the Museum of Modern Art (New York), New Orleans Museum of Art, J. Paul Getty Museum (Los Angeles), Victoria & Albert Museum (London), Château de Versailles, Centre Pompidou (Paris), and Bibliothèque Nationale (Paris), as well as many private collections.

Described as one of the "most esteemed practitioners of large-scale photography," Polidori has photographed the restoration of the Château de Versailles since the early 1980s. He has also recorded the architecture and interiors of Havana, the inner-city habitats of Mumbai, Rio de Janeiro, and Amman, the post Hurricane Katrina devastation of New Orleans, buildings emptied by the Chernobyl nuclear disaster, and shelled structures in Beirut. At the time of the Musée d'art contemporain de Montréal retrospective exhibition in 2009, curator Paulette Gagnon described his work as a "photographic account that invites us to share the historical moments it portrays, making them part of the collective memory."

He was also the cinematographer for the 1980 independent film Personal Problems.

== Life and career ==
Robert Polidori was born in 1951 in Montreal, Quebec, Canada, to a French-Canadian mother and a Corsican father. At age 9, Polidori's family moved to the United States where his father worked as an engineer at Air Force bases and NASA installations. He grew up in Seattle, southern California, New Orleans, and Cocoa Beach, and first attended university in Florida in 1969. During his freshman year Polidori saw Michael Snow's film Wavelength (1967 film) and, inspired to study filmmaking, moved to New York City. The following year, he was hired by the legendary Jonas Mekas and worked as the theatre manager of the Anthology Film Archives. During this time, Polidori worked on four experimental films. He exhibited in 1975 at the Whitney Museum of American Art. In 1980 he graduated with a Masters of Arts in film from State University of New York (Buffalo).

Polidori became interested in still photography while editing film frame-by-frame. Inspired by Frances Yates' description in The Art of Memory of mnemonic systems requiring the memorization of empty rooms, he purchased a large-format camera in 1982 and photographed abandoned apartments on New York's Lower East Side. In 1983, he moved to Paris and, interested in how empty spaces revealed history, and began to document the restoration of Château de Versailles as a symbol of "society’s superego". In the late 1990s Polidori was engaged by The New Yorker to photograph Havana's decaying architectural heritage and joined the magazine as a staff photographer in 1998. Images from his Cuban series were later published in Havana (2001) by Steidl Verlag. Also interested in inner-city habitats or "auto-constructed" growth, Polidori recorded the favelas of Rio de Janeiro, urban sprawl of Brasilia, construction boom in Dubai, and slums of Mumbai. In May 2001, he photographed the closed Chernobyl nuclear power plant and nearby ghost town of Pripyat, Ukraine, and these images were later published as Zones of Exclusion – Pripyat and Chernobyl (2003). In 2002 Polidori was commissioned to photograph Detroit's Michigan Central Station for Metropolis (architecture magazine). Described by editor Martin C. Pedersen as "a keen observer of the built world", the magazine later published his urban images as Robert Polidori's Metropolis (2005).

In the wake of Hurricane Katrina in 2005, Polidori photographed the damaged homes and buildings of New Orleans, and documented the city's early restoration in 2006. Published as After the Flood (2006) by Steidl Verlag, many of these images were also exhibited at New York's Metropolitan Museum of Art as "New Orleans after the Flood", a popular and well-attended exhibition. Exhibitions of After the Flood were also mounted in London, Venice, and Toronto, as well as in New Orleans. During this time, Polidori continued to document the restoration of Château de Versailles and these photographs, published in the three-volume Parcour Muséologique Revisité (2009), were included in his retrospective exhibition at the Musée d'art contemporain de Montréal. Polidori returned to Beirut in 2010 where he photographed the damaged rooms of the famous Hotel Petra, abandoned during Lebanon's civil war. The following year, he traveled to Paris to photograph the stored art collection of Yves Saint Laurent (designer), and to Venice to photograph the fashion label Bottega Veneta's fall 2011 campaign at the Palazzo Papadopoli. From 2011 to 2015, Polidori also revisited and rephotographed Rio as well as Mumbai, including Dharavi's industrial street facade in a series of tracking shots. Exhibited as composite panoramic murals at Paul Kasmin Gallery (New York) in September 2016, these images were also published in the accompanying volume 60 Feet Road by Steidl Verlag.

Since 2015, Polidori and his family live in Ojai, California.

== Equipment and approach ==
Polidori takes photographs with a large-format analog (photographic film) view-camera using 5x7, 8x10, or 11x14 inch color sheet negatives; at times, he also uses a medium-format camera. Shot in natural light with up to 5-minute exposures, his images are described as "almost forensic" in detail. His work includes meticulously framed single images and multiple images of tracking shots, which are scanned and composited later by digital means. Polidori describes his photographic approach as inquisitive: "When you point a camera at something, it is like asking a question. But the picture that emerges is like an answer." He also noted the paradox of photographic labor, "to deliver up to some surface an epitome of something that occurred as an instant in the continuum of time, and to somehow how have it represent all of time." Interested in creating commemorative images which serve memory or history, some series like Havana include portraiture, while others like the Chernobyl Zones of Exclusion or New Orleans After the Flood are devoid of people although representative of their inhabitants.

In a review of the 2006 New Orleans after the Flood exhibition, John Updike described his approach: "Polidori, his work makes clear, loves the grave, delicate, and poignant beauty of architecture when the distracting presence of human inhabitants is eliminated from photographs." Noting the attendance of "more youthful African-Americans than usually make their way into the Met," he concluded: "It is for our children and our grandchildren—for the historical record... This is what it looked like; this is what we don’t want to happen again." This approach was debated within art blogs and criticized for contextual loss when one image was used in a Brazilian non-profit, anti-smoking campaign. At the time of his 2016 New York exhibition, Polidori commented: "Personally I am more attracted to photographs that attempt to be more objective and 'emblematic' of a subject’s qualities rather than a personal subjective interpretation of phenomena."

== Recognition and contribution ==
The subject of Fotografic Portfolio Edition #41, art director Tom Jacobi described Polidori as "a master of spatial aesthetics," while writer Von Jochen Siemens called him a "cultural detective for places with a story to tell." In a Domus Italiano review, Beatrice Zamponi wrote, he "trains his lens on the ruins of recent times, on dilapidated surroundings infused with profound aestheticism, turning them into a subtle instrument of social investigation." At the time of Musée d'art contemporain de Montréal retrospective, curator Paulette Gagnon commented on the beauty of Polidori's photographs, "the subtle colours and perfect harmony of line and material seem to endow the image with some of the power and appeal of paintings," as well as their power: "Concerned above all with the human condition, he explains situations – often crisis or disaster – that brings us back to life's essentials and shatter our complacency." Described in The Wall Street Journal as "meditations on the concepts of transience and decay, the cracked and peeling walls revealing layers of history," Stephen Wallis concluded: "Polidori has never been purely a documentarian. His interest has always lain in making 'psychological portraits' of architectural spaces, which he sees as vessels for memories and as projections of the people who have lived there." At the time of the 2006 Metropolitan Museum's exhibition New Orleans after the Flood, New York Times journalist Michael Kimmelman noted that Polidori's images "also express an archaeologist’s aspiration to document plain-spoken truth, and they are without most of the tricks of the trade that photographers exploit to turn victims into objects and pictures of pain into tributes to themselves." In The New York Review of Books, author John Updike wrote, "it is the wrecked, mildewed interiors that take our eye and quicken our anxiety.... If the discomfort that After the Flood and Aftermath arouse contains an increment of discomfort at the poshness of the volumes and the aura of glamorous selflessness bestowed upon the photographers and their photographic appropriations, the record is indeed enhanced, for posterity to consult, and to use in ways we cannot imagine."

== Exhibitions and collections ==
Polidori's work has been the subject of solo exhibitions at the Whitney Museum of American Art: New Filmmakers Program (New York), the Metropolitan Museum of Art (New York), Musée d'art contemporain de Montréal, Martin-Gropius-Bau museum (Berlin), and the Instituto Moreira Salles (São Paulo and Rio de Janeiro). His work has also been shown in private galleries around world, including:

- Bykert Gallery (New York)
- Edwynn Houk Gallery (Zurich and New York)
- Paul Kasmin Gallery (New York)
- Mary Boone Gallery (New York)
- Fontana Gallery (Amsterdam)
- Galerie Karsten Greve (Paris)
- Flowers Gallery (London)
- Nicholas Metivier Gallery (Toronto)
- Galerie de Bellefeuille (Montreal)
- Galleria Carla Sozzani (Milan and Seoul).

His work is in the collections of:

- Metropolitan Museum of Art (New York)
- Museum of Modern Art (New York)
- New Orleans Museum of Art (New Orleans)
- Museum of Fine Arts (Houston)
- J. Paul Getty Museum (Los Angeles)
- Los Angeles County Museum of Art
- Musée d'art contemporain de Montréal
- Victoria & Albert Museum (London)
- Château de Versailles
- Centre Pompidou (Paris)
- Maison Européenne de la Photographie (Paris)
- Bibliothèque Nationale (Paris)
- Martin-Gropius-Bau museum (Berlin)
- Instituto Moreira Salles (São Paulo and Rio de Janeiro).

His photographs are also included in the collections of Princeton University, Yale University (New Haven), and New York University (New York).

== Awards ==
- 1998 World Press Award for Art
- 1999 & 2000 Alfred Eisenstaedt Award for Magazine Photography, Architecture
- 2006 Deutscher Fotobuchpreis for After the Flood
- 2008 Liliane Bettencourt Prix de la Photographie for Parcours Muséologique Revisité

== Publications ==
- Hotel Petra. Steidl Verlag, 2016.
- 60 Feet Road. Steidl Verlag, 2016.
- RIO. Steidl Verlag, 2015.
- Chronophagia: Selected Works 1984–2009, Steidl Verlag, 2014.
- Eye & I. Steidl Verlag, 2014.
- Points Between... Up Till Now, Steidl Verlag, 2014.
- Parcours Muséologique Revisité (3 volumes), Steidl Verlag, 2009.
- Robert Polidori: Fotografias. Instituto Moreira Salles, 2009.
- After the Flood. Steidl Verlag, 2006.
- Robert Polidori’s Metropolis. Steidl Verlag, 2005.
- Zones of Exclusion – Pripyat and Chernobyl, Steidl Verlag, 2003.
- Havana. Steidl Verlag, 2001.

Photographic Collaborations

- Gatier, Pierre-Louis, et al. The Levant: History and Archaeology in the Eastern Mediterranean. Könemann, 2001.
- Eberle, Todd, and Joaquim Paiva. Brasilia de 0 a 40 anos. 2000.
- Di Vita-Evrard, Ginette. Libya: The Lost Cities of the Roman Empire. Könemann, 1999.
- Pérouse de Montclos, Jean-Marie. Chateaux of the Loire Valley. Könemann, 1997.
- Sites Greco-Romaines de la Tripolitaine et Cyrénaïque. 1997.
- Pérouse de Montclos, Jean-Marie. Versailles. Artabras, 1994.
