= Leiko Ikemura =

Japanese-Swiss painter and sculptor (born 1951)

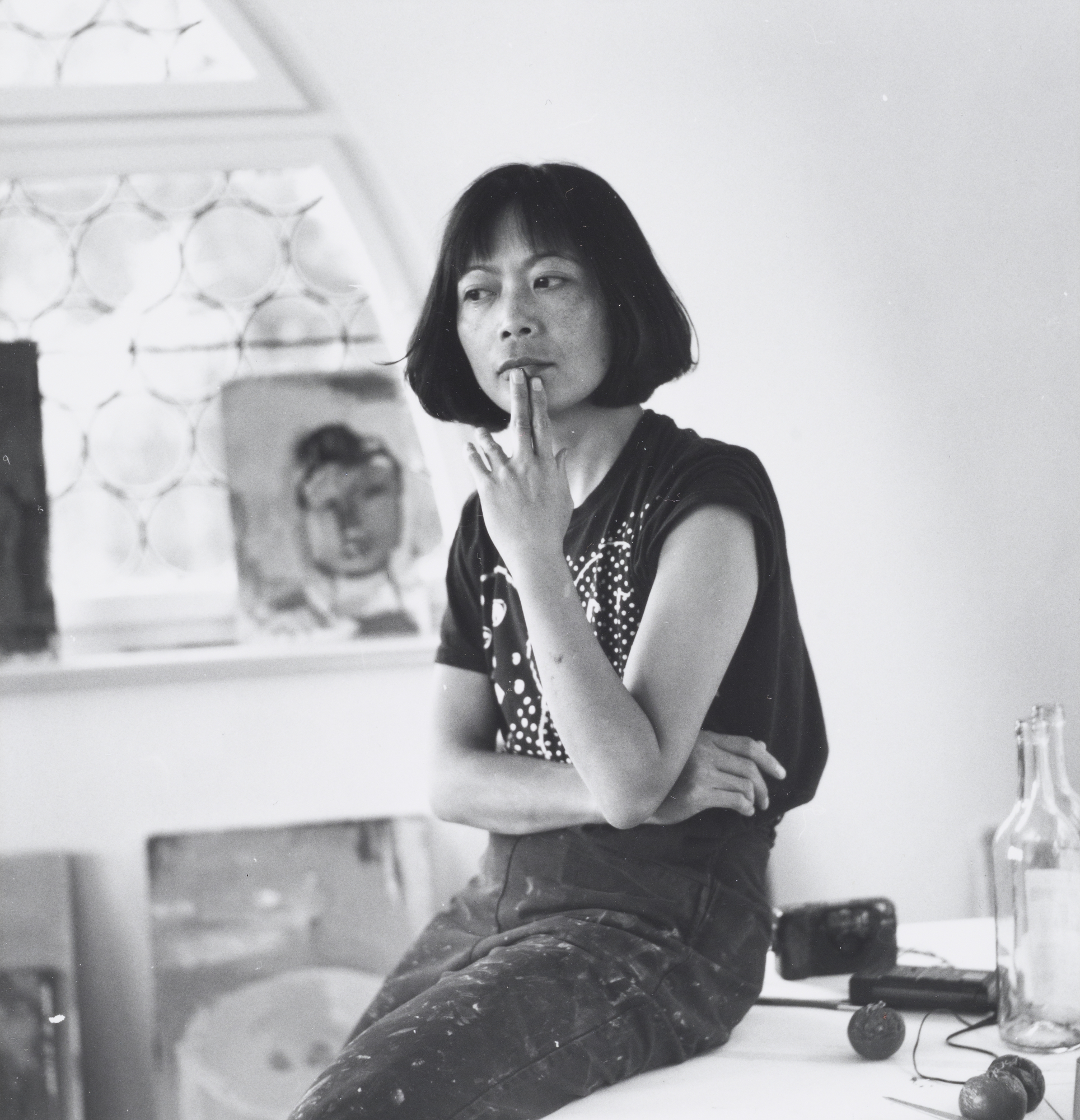
- Born: 22 August 1951 (age 75); Tsu, Mie Prefecture, Japan
- Education: Academia de Bellas Artes, Spain
- Known for: Melbourne International Biennial 1999
- Style: painting, sculpture, drawing, watercolor, prints, and photography
- Website: www.leiko.info

Leiko Ikemura (イケムラレイコ, Ikemura Reiko; born 22 August 1951 in Tsu, Mie Prefecture, Japan) is a Japanese-Swiss artist who works in a variety of mediums, including oil painting, sculpture, and watercolor. She divides her time between Cologne and Berlin, teaching painting at the Hochschule der Künste in Berlin. Active on the international art scene since the 1970s, she is known for her work within the Neo-Expressionism movement of the 1980s, as well as her continually evolving style. Much of her oeuvre features elements of symbolism, involving the creation of magical universes blend elements of her animals, humans, and plants. Her work has been featured in a number of solo exhibitions in Japan and Europe, and is held in the permanent collections of major institutions such at the Centre Pompidou, Kunstmuseum Basel, Kunstmuseum Bern, Kunsthaus Zurich, and the National Museum of Modern Art, Tokyo. In 2023, she had her first solo exhibition in Mexico at the Museo de Arte de Zapopan.

== Biography ==
Leiko Ikemura studied at Osaka University from 1970 to 1972, majoring in Spanish. She then left Japan to study in Spain from 1973 to 1978 at the Academia de Bellas Artes in Granada and Seville. In 1979, Ikemura moved to Zurich to pursue a career as an artist. Her first solo exhibition in a public institution took place in 1983 at the Bonner Kunstverein, in Bonn, Germany. That same year, she received the Stadterichnerin von Nurnberg, an artist residency facilitated by Faber-Castell and the City of Nuremberg.

A year later, the artist relocated to Germany, moving to Munich in 1984 and then Cologne in 1986, where she developed an interest in sculpture and began experimenting with mediums such as bronze and ceramic.

In 1991, Ikemura became a professor of painting at the Universität der Künste (University of the Arts) in Berlin.

Leiko Ikemura lives and works in Berlin and Cologne. Since 2014, she has also held a professorship at the Joshibi University of Art and Design in Tokyo. She has identified Japan and Switzerland as both feeling like "home," and in addition to her native Japanese is fluent in Spanish, German, and English.

== Work and Themes ==
Ikemura's work spans a variety of mediums, from drawing to painting to sculpture to video. While the use of these mediums overlap throughout the course of her career, her oeuvre can also be loosely divided into epochs that place focus on central themes, subjects, and materials.

She and critics have cited early influences on her work such as Nietzsche, Matisse, Goya, El Greco, and Picasso. However, her work is largely regarded to have transcended these influences, fusing them with elements of radical feminism, restrained historical commentary, and mysticism, and making it "difficult to differentiate the Japanese and European aspects of [her] work."

=== Early Work: Drawings ===
Ikemura first began her career in Switzerland primarily with drawing. Though she has continued to work in other mediums since, critics have stressed that her drawings have always been complete and individual works in themselves rather than preliminary sketches for later paintings or sculptures.

Ikemura herself has expressed a particular emotional affinity with the medium of drawing, describing it as "immediate and honest," with this honesty being a crucial tenet to her work and lifestyle. She has also noted the vast stylistic potential of the medium and how this is manifested in her drawings throughout the course of the career. "There must be a hundred different possibilities of treating drawings," she said in 2019 interview, "and sometimes people think there are a hundred different people in me, because my drawings from each period are so distinctive."

=== A Turn Towards Painting: Landscape, Triptychs, and Transcultural Elements ===
In the early 1980s, Ikemura noticed a shift in her work. Working in Germany amongst other "wild painters," she found that her strokes had become aggressive, and the themes increasingly violent. Seeking to gain some space to regroup and start afresh, she went on a retreat to the Swiss Alps, where she began to do some work with landscape painting.

Starting in the 1990s, she began to experiment with both small paintings, to focus more closely on specific subject matter, as well as larger-scale triptychs. Ikemura's triptychs consist largely of landscape elements, fusing imagery from European landscapes Japanese landscape imagery. They incorporate both natural scenery and animal subjects. Art critics and historians have surmised that her choice of the triptych is in part an act of cultural translation, another subtle incorporation of transnational religious/spiritual elements that imbues the work with the sense of abstraction and multiplicitous interpretative potential that Ikemura's artistic universe is so known for. The triptych is a format used by European painters throughout history, often to depict religious scenes or narratives. Ikemura's triptychs, in contrast, do not evoke this subject matter, and there is often no clear visual linkage between the separate panels in terms of subject; however, the use of the format still creates this subliminal association. In her work Genesis, Ikemura makes this association even clearer; while the landscape depicted is of the Tōkaidō, an Edo period road that spanned from present-day Tokyo to Kyoto, the title of the work links the historical Japanese trade route with the biblical story, creating a compelling, though abstract visual narrative.

=== Girl Motif ===
The motif of the young girl first became prevalent in Ikemura's work in the early '90s, and has since been a recurring subject in her oeuvre. Ikemura explained one of her reasons for the choice of this motif in a 2011 interview:

"When women are represented in art, they are women as seen by men. That's why I feel it is a crucial task for me to depict females, at the ambiguous and uneasy age when women are formed, as subjects rather than objects."

Feeling herself that she was taught to grow up and leave childhood behind quickly due to this societal model of girl/womanhood, Ikemura seeks to push back against stereotypical depictions of girls in popular culture (in both Japan and beyond) as meek, helpless, decorative, and sexualized. Such subversions of these models can be seen across her work, including her terracotta "Cabbage Heads" from 2015 onward, her oil paintings of a subject called "Miko" in the 90s, and her recent tempera portraits.

In addition to images of girlhood, tensions and conflict between mothers and their children also appear frequently in Ikemura's work.

=== Rabbit Imagery, Tohoku Earthquake, and Usagi Kannon ===
In recent decades, the motif of the rabbit has featured prominently in Ikemura's work, in both her drawings, paintings, and sculpture. In line with other prevailing elements of her craft, the rabbit has been chosen in part as a subject because of the many experiences and interpretations it affords: the rabbit features prominently in Japanese folk literature as synonymic with the moon. It is also a prevalent theme in European art history, featured in the works of artists like Joseph Beuys and Albrecht Dürer. Adding to this ontological complexity, it has also appeared as a symbol of fertility in folklore around the world and is a major figure in Lewis Carroll's Alice in Wonderland, a book featuring a similar kind of abstract, dreamlike universe to that created by Ikemura's works.

Ikemura was deeply affected by the aftermath of the March 2011 Tohoku Earthquake, and in response created the first largescale Usagi Kannon. This sculpture, standing over 3 meters in height, depicted a hybrid of a rabbit and the Mother Kannon (the Japanese Bodhisattva of Compassion). The lower half of the figure was hollow, so that viewers could enter the work itself and feel a sense of protection and healing.

Variations of the Usagi Kannon have since appeared in a number of public spaces and institutions, including in Valencia, a train station in Recklinghausen, the Vangi Sculpture Garden Museum in Shizuoka, Kunstmuseum Basel, and the foyer of the Museum of East Asian Art in Cologne. The variations in Ikemura's sculptural works result both from conscious artistic choices, such as variations in materials used and placement of features of the figures, but also as capitalizations upon incidental imperfections in the artistic process. Comparing her to a musician, Kosme de Barañano y Letamendía writes: "Ikemura sees no imperfections in the casts or in the cast iron that has not yet fully cooled: If she notices a flaw, a metal burr or an air bubble, she immediately sees the opportunity to re-orchestrate, to add another chord, to complete her jam session."

== Exhibitions (selection) ==
- 2010: "Leiko Ikemura. August-Macke-Preisträgerin 2008", Sauerland-Museum-Arnsberg, Germany
- 2011: "Leiko Ikemura: Transfiguration", The National Museum of Modern Art, MOMAT, Tokyo, Japan
- 2012: "Leiko Ikemura. Korekara or the Serenity of Fragile Being", Museum of Asian Art, Berlin, Germany
- 2013: "Leiko Ikemura. i-migration", Staatliche Kunsthalle Karlsruhe, Germany
- 2014: "Leiko Ikemura: PIOON", Vangi Sculpture Garden Museum, Nagaizumi, Shizuoka Prefecture, Japan
- 2015/16: "All about Girls and Tigers. Leiko Ikemura", Museum für Ostasiatische Kunst Köln, Germany
- 2016: "Leiko Ikemura. ...and suddenly the wind turns", Haus am Waldsee, Berlin, Germany
- 2017: "Ikemura und Nolde", Kunstmuseum Ahrenshoop, Germany
- 2018: "Im Atelier Liebermann: Leiko Ikemura im Dialog mit Donata und Wim Wenders", Stiftung Brandenburger Tor – Max Liebermann Haus, Berlin
- 2019: "Leiko Ikemura Our Planet – Earth & Stars", The National Art Center, Tokyo, Japan
- 2019: "Leiko Ikemura – Toward New Seas", Kunstmuseum Basel, Schwitzerland
- 2020: "Leiko Ikemura – In Praise of Light", St.-Matthäus-Kirche, Berlin, Germany
- 2021: "Leiko Ikemura – Usagi in Wonderland", Sainsbury Centre for Visual Arts, Norwich, Great Britain
- 2021: "Leiko Ikemura: Here we are/Aquí Estamos", Ciudad de las Artes y las Ciencias, Valencia, Spain
- 2022: "Leiko Ikemura: Wenn Pfauen Flügel öffnen", Herbert Gerisch-Stiftung, Neumünster, Germany

== Books ==
- "Leiko Ikemura. Our Planet. Earth & Stars イケムラレイコ 土と星" authors: Mitsue Nagaya, Anita Haldemann, Michiko Kasahara, Stefan Kraus, Wim Wenders, Udo Kittelmann, Atsushi Tanaka, Toshiyuki Horie, Kenjiro Hosaka, editors: Mitsue Nagaya, Mina Hisamatsu, Shiori Takano
- "u mi no ko" (jap) poems and drawings by Leiko Ikemura, The Vangi Sculpture Garden Museum, Akaaka (Japan), ISBN 4-903545-04-0
- "andalusia" authors: John Yau, Leiko Ikemura, Weidle Verlag, ISBN 3-931135-96-9
- "Leiko Ikemura: Sculpture, painting, drawing" authors: Hans-Jürgen Schwalm, Wilfried Dickhoff, Britta E. Buhlmann, Elisabeth Bronfen, Kunsthalle Recklinghausen ISBN 3-929040-81-6
- "beyond the horizon" de, en, jap, Toyota Municipal Museum of Art; T. Kitagawa, editors: Fölbach, Dietmar ISBN 3-934795-50-1
- "Leiko Ikemura" authors: Udo Kittelmann, Friedemann Malsch, Noemi Smolik, editor: Galerie Karsten Greve, Paris, Cologne, Milano
- "Leiko Ikemura" authors: Gerard A. Goodrow, Kimio Jinno, Friedeman Malsch, Alexander Pühringer, Cantz, ISBN 3-89322-803-9
- "Alpenindianer" authors: Leiko Ikemura, Akira Tatehata, editor: Satani Gallery, Tokyo
- "Hundertundelf Haiku" authors: Matsuo Bashō, 22 drawings from Leiko Ikemura, editor: Amman Verlag, Zurich
- "Leiko Ikemura: Gemälde, Zeichnungen 1980–1987", authors: Dieter Koepplin, Museum für Gegenwartskunst (Basel) ISBN 3-7204-0053-0
- "Der stumme Schrei" authors: Kenzaburō Ōe, Leiko Ikemura, editor (Nobel Prize Edition): Coron Verlag (CH)
- "Shadows" authors: Leiko Ikemura, editor: Johan Jonker, Amsterdam et Gabriele Rivet, Cologne
- "Leiko Ikemura" authors: Curt Heigl, Anton Wolfgang Graf von Faber-Castell, Kunsthalle Nürnberg
- "Ancestors" authors: Leiko Ikemura, edition, Kunstverein St. Gallen, (CH)
- "Wild cats and domestic cats" authors: Leiko Ikemura, 61 drawings, Edition Stähli, Zurich

== Awards and honors ==
- 2025 - Person of Cultural Merit
