= Melbourne International Biennial 1999 =

The Melbourne International Biennial was a large scale art exhibition of over 60 local and international artists held over six weeks in 1999 in a disused telephone exchange and office building in the central city of Melbourne, Australia, along with eleven 'national pavilions' in existing public and private galleries. Despite its popular and critical success, it proved to be a one-off event.

It was an initiative of the City of Melbourne, who provided the bulk of the public funding, in partnership with Arts Victoria, the Victorian Department of Premier and Cabinet, the Ian Potter Museum of Art (part of The University of Melbourne). Originally called Melbourne Arts International, the event later changed name once the University of Melbourne became a partner, and brought in Frances Lindsay as director, and curator Juliana Enberg as artistic director, who initiated a successful fund-raising campaign that raised another $1 million of in-kind sponsorship. The event was titled "Signs of Life", and ran from 14 May through 27 June 1999. It occupied the semi-gutted spaces of an 8-storey former Telstra telephone exchange building, on the corner Russell Street and Little Collins Street, which was about to be converted into apartments. The event proved hugely popular, visited by 21,000 people, and garnered critical approval.

According to Enberg, "[Signs of Life was designed to exhibit] a very human set of projects, as should be the case as we leave the twentieth century and begin to engage with the next millennial frontier."

Despite the success, further funding from the City of Melbourne and the confirmation of Enberg as artistic director for the next Biennial in 2001, the institutions attached to the project eventually pulled out, making the 1999 Biennial the first and last.

The artists in the show included:

- Eija-Liisa Ahtila
- Francis Alÿs
- Art Orienté objet
- Terri Bird
- Monica Bonvicini
- Louise Bourgeois
- Stephen Bush
- Maurizio Cattelan
- Brenda L Croft
- Yael Davids
- Destiny Deacon
- PlamenDejanov & Swetlana Heger
- Amanda Dunsmore
- Michael Elmgreen and Ingar Dragset
- Ângela Ferreira
- John Frankland
- Robert Gligorov
- Robert Gober
- Graham Gussin
- Teresa Hubbard / Alexander Birchler
- Meta Isaeus-Berlin
- Lyndal Jones
- Peter Kennedy
- Martin Kersels
- Job Koelewijn
- Andrea Lange
- Chad McCail
- Aernout Mik
- Tastuo Miyajima
- Callum Morton
- Deimantas Narkevicius
- Fanni Niemi-Junkola
- Mariele Neudecker
- David Noonan
- Susan Norrie
- OLO
- Anne Ooms
- Catherine Opie
- Miguel Palma
- Cornelia Parker
- João Penalva
- Susan Philipsz
- Patricia Piccinini
- Hans Hamid Rasmussen
- Nikolaj Recke
- Torbjørn Rødland
- Ugo Rondinone
- Vivienne Shark LeWitt
- Dan Shipsides
- Smith/Steward
- Ricky Swallow
- Francisco Tropa
- Gitte Villesen
- Kenji Yanobe
- Miwa Yanagi
- Li Yongbin

Following a method deployed by other art biennials like Venice Biennale and São Paulo Art Biennial, the Melbourne Biennale featured 11 'national pavilions' in existing public and private galleries across the city. Participants included:

- Austrian Pavilion: Anne Schneider, Elke Krystufek, Franz West (curator: Andraes Reiter Raabe)
- Belgian Pavilion: Dirk Braeckman, Jan Van Imschoot, Sven 't Jolle (curator: Jan Hoet)
- Canadian Pavilion: Geoffrey Farmer, Myfanwy Macleod, Ron Terada, (curator: Kitty Scott)
- Chinese Pavilion: Wang Jianwei, Li Yongbin (curator: Huang Du)
- Danish Pavilion: Henriette Heise, Jakob Jakobsen (curator: Dorthe Abildgaard & Marianne Krogh Jensen)
- French Pavilion: Valérie Jouve (co-ordinator: by Jean-Pierre Dumont)
- Italian Pavilion: Paola di Bello, Mauricio Lupini, Roberto Marossi, Marcello Maloberti, Gabriele di Matteo, Alessandra Spranzi, Bert Theis, Enzo Umbaca (curators: Jen Budney & Roberto Pinto)
- Japanese Pavilion: Leiko Ikemura (curator: Itaru Hirano)
- Norwegian Pavilion: Knut Åsdam, (curators: Bo Krister Wallström & Jørn Mortensen for UKS - Unge Kunstneres Samfund)
- Philippine Pavilion: Gerardo Tan (curator: Professor Patrick Flores)
- Swiss Pavilion: Sidney Stucki (curator: Pierre-André Lienhard)
