= Norbert Prangenberg =

German artist (1949–2012)

- Born: Norbert Prangenberg; June 23, 1949; Nettesheim, Cologne, Germany
- Died: June 29, 2012 (aged 63); Krefeld, Germany
- Known for: Painting, Sculpture

Norbert Prangenberg (June 23, 1949 — June 29, 2012) was an abstract painter, sculptor, and engraver who was born in Nettseheim, just outside of Cologne, Germany. Though he had no formal training and did not fully engage with art until his 30s, Prangenberg did finally come up with a style that was uniquely his own, not fitting comfortably into the neo-expressionist or neo-geo movements of his time, in the 1970s and 1980s. At this time, he was considered a major figure in contemporary German art. Though he got his start with abstract paintings, he also became known for making sculptures of all sizes; and while his work initially appears abstract, the titles given sometimes allude to the human body or a landscape. As a trained gold- and silversmith, as well as a glassblower, he always showed an attention to materials and how they could be physically engaged with. He was interested in how his own two hands could affect the painting or sculpture's surface. Traces of the artist's hand appear literally throughout his entire oeuvre, before he lost the battle with liver cancer in 2012.

== Biography ==
At age 13, Prangenberg was studying to be a gold- and silversmith. After three and a half years of study and a year working for a small company, he attended a werkkunstchule (school for crafts) until the age of 23. Once he was finished with his studies he began working at a glass factory, making designs for wine glasses and vases. At this point, he began dabbling with his own independent drawing and painting. From the age of 26 to 29, he continued freelancing at various glass factories and became a father of two. At this time, he also became critically engaged with the surrounding art world in Cologne and Düsseldorf, visiting galleries and museums frequently and seeing art by leading visionaries such as Jasper Johns and Yves Klein. By the age of 30, Prangenberg felt confident that he was making art that was uniquely his. On a whim, he contacted museum curator Johannes Cladders who began championing his work immediately and connecting him to other curators and dealers. By the 1980s, he becomes a full-time artist, moving organically between watercolor, sculpture, and oil painting, sometimes simultaneously. Throughout his artistic career he always kept a fine eye on material and sought to experiment with how his own hand could change the surface of an abstract painting or bulbous sculpture.

== Artistic style ==
Prangenberg's initial forays into art making were in the 1980s and his interests were focused primarily on color and structure. His medium of choice was watercolor on paper or canvas and his easel of choice was in fact not an easel at all, but the floor. Only after he was done would he stretch the painting over stretcher bars. He continued using this process until 2007. According to John Yau, these early paintings were "planes of luminous color inhabited by geometric forms, which seem to have been scooped out." Yau may have made use of the words "scooped out" because Prangenberg was using an impasto technique, applying the paint in a thick manner that allowed the surfaces to be cut into.

By the 1990s, Prangenberg was also working with sculpture. Annegret Laabs, writing in 2008 in the artist's monograph, "Norbert Prangenberg: Venustas et Fortuna," explained: "Up to the mid-1990s, the focus of his ceramic works was to be found in large, bulbous, hollow forms, usually lying on their side, which were characterized by the independent movement of the glass flux that surrounds the terracotta when it is fired, and which ultimately merges light and darkness, the visible and the imaginary, or, indeed, keeps them apart." However, after the mid-1990s, Pragnenberg rotates these large scale, monumental sculptures so that they are standing, mimicking a standing human body. Yet, they maintain the same spontaneous, playful, organic nature of the ones resting on their sides. His sculptures also show an interest in materiality; in certain parts of the clay forms you can see where his fingerprints have affected the surface by way of holes, notches, and incisions.

In the 2000s, he switched up his painting and sculpting techniques substantially. In 2007, he stopped painting with watercolors directly on the floor and focused, instead, on oil painting on easels. These abstract paintings tended to have distinct areas within the composition. This way of making a painting within a painting informed his later ceramic sculptures. In 2012, he was awarded a six-week residency in the ceramics studio at Mason Gross School of the Arts at Rutgers. Though he was battling liver cancer at the time, he churned out many small scale works. Writing about the works in 2014, Roberta Smith noted that his "small, ebullient tabletop works convey a wildness typical of kindergarteners." Going one step further, Ben La Rocco wrote of the pieces: "One finds tiny landscapes, portrait heads, a stag, what looks like fragments of architecture, byzantine patterning, abstractions, and other bits of imagery painted into the glazes, creating a miniature exhibition of painting within the sculpture exhibition." In fact, Prangenberg named these works exclusively either "Kopf" (head) or "Landschaft" (landscape), perhaps encouraging us to look past the initial estimate of abstraction. Additionally, many of them had smaller surfaces with painting on them; it was as if many works of art made up one small sculpture.

== Exhibitions ==
=== Solo exhibition ===
1980

- Norbert Prangenberg: Bilder und Zeichnungen, Galerie Karsten Greve, Cologne

1981

- Norbert Prangenberg, Galerie Karsten Greve, Cologne

1982

- Norbert Prangenberg, Bonner Kunstverein, Bonn, March 15–April 24

1983

- Norbert Prangenberg, Galerie Anders Tornberg, Lund, Sweden
- Norbert Prangenberg: Bilder, Zeichnungen, Skulpturen, Galerie Karsten Greve, Cologne
- Norbert Prangenberg, Knoedler Gallery, London

1984

- Norbert Prangenberg, Museum Haus Lange and Haus Esters, Krefeld, Germany, May 6–June 24
- Norbert Prangenberg, Galerie Meyer-Ellinger, Frankfurt, Germany

1985

- Norbert Prangenberg, Knoedler Gallery, London

1986

- Norbert Prangenberg, Hirschl & Adler Modern, New York, October 4–25
- Norbert Prangenberg, Gesellschaft für Aktuelle Kunst, Bremen, November 2–December 7
- Norbert Prangenberg, Galerie Karsten Greve, Cologne

1987

- Norbert Prangenberg: Bilder, Zeichnungen, Skulpturen, Galerie Karsten Greve, Cologne, September
- Norbert Prangenberg, Galleri Thomas Wallner, Malmö, Sweden

1988

- Norbert Prangenberg: Linolschnitte, 1978–1988, Rathaus Reutlingen, Germany, April 30–May 6
- Norbert Prangenberg, Galerie Bismarck, Bremen

1988–1989

- Norbert Prangenberg: Plastiche Arbeiten, Galerie Karsten Greve, Cologne, December 10, 1988 – February 11, 1989

1989

- Norbert Prangenberg: Malerei, Kunstverein Bochum, Germany
- Norbert Prangenberg, Galerie Barbara Gross, Munich

1990

- Norbert Prangenberg: Keramikskulpturen und Zeichnungen, Badischer Kunstverein, Karlsruhe, Germany, September 9–October 14
- Norbert Prangenberg, Galerie Schneiderei, Cologne
- Norbert Prangenberg, Galerie Karsten Greve, Paris

1991

- Norbert Prangenberg: Bilder, Zeichnungen, Skulpturen, Galerie Barbara Gross, Munich
- Norbert Prangenberg: Skulpturen und Zeichnungen, Bilder, Produzentengalerie Hamburg, March 16–May 11

1992

- Norbert Prangenberg: Morgenlandfahrer, Galerie Karsten Greve, Cologne

1993

- Norbert Prangenberg: Bilder, Skulpturen, Zeichnungen, Galerie Barbara Gross, Munich
- Norbert Prangenberg, Kunstverein Heinsberg, Germany
- Norbert Prangenberg, Galerie Karsten Greve, Cologne
- Norbert Prangenberg, Galerie Bismarck, Bremen
- Norbert Prangenberg, Krefelder Kunstverein, Krefeld, Germany

1994

- Norbert Prangenberg: Bilder, Skulpturen, Aquarelle in der Sammlung Finkenberg, Neues Museum Weserburg, Bremen
- Norbert Prangenberg: Porcelaine de Sèvres, Galerie Karsten Greve, Cologne and Paris
- Norbert Prangenberg: Figuren, Produzentengalerie, Hamburg, April 23–June 4
- Norbert Prangenberg, Galerie Tilly Haderek, Stuttgart, October 22–December 17

1995

- Norbert Prangenberg: Raumarbeit, Kunstverein Ruhr, Essen, Germany, February 17–April 9
- Norbert Prangenberg, Galerie Bismarck, Bremen
- Norbert Prangenberg: Malerei, Galerie Barbara Gross, Munich

1996–1997

- Norbert Prangenberg, Württembergischer Kunstverein, Stuttgart, April 20–May 26, 1996; Westfälischer Kunstverein, Münster, Germany, August 31–October 13, 1996; Gemeentelijk Centrum voor Beeldende Kunst de Beyerde, Breda, Netherlands, March 23–May 4, 1997

1997

- Norbert Prangenberg, Europees Keramisch Werkcentrum, s’Hertogenbosch, Netherlands

1998

- Norbert Prangenberg: Neue Bilder, Galerie Barbara Gross, Munich
- Norbert Prangenberg: Bilder, Galerie Karsten Greve, Cologne
- Norbert Prangenberg, Produzentengalerie, Hamburg
- Norbert Prangenberg, Galerie Harry Zellweger, Basel

1998–1999

- Norbert Prangenberg, Galerie Rupert Walser, Munich, October 20, 1998 – January 22, 1999

1999

- Norbert Prangenberg: Skulpturen, Forum Rotunde, Staatliche Kunsthalle Karlsruhe, Germany
- Norbert Prangenberg: Bilder und Aquarelle, Galerie Bismarck, Bremen

2000

- 50.59: Norbert Prangenberg, Zeche Zollverein, Essen, January 8–23
- Norbert Prangenberg: Die Wurzel (Skulpturen und Zeichnungen), Hermeshof, Rommerskirchen, Germany, September 3–October 29
- Norbert Prangenberg: Bilder & Skulpturen, Galerie Hollenbach, Stuttgart, September 22–November 21
- Norbert Prangenberg: Malerei, Trinitatiskirche, Cologne

2001–2002

- Norbert Prangenberg: Holzschnitte, Linolschnitte, Werkverzeichnis, 1988–2001, Städtische Galerie, Bietigheim-Bissingen, May 12–June 24, 2001; Versicherungskammer Bayern, Munich, September 5–November 3, 2001; Städtisches Museum Schloss Morsbroich, Leverkusen, Germany, March–May, 2002

2002

- Norbert Prangenberg: Zeichnungen, Galerie Barbara Gross, Munich
- Norbert Prangenberg: Skulpturen, Bilder, Zeichnungen, Galerie Karsten Greve, Cologne
- Norbert Prangenberg, Galerie Lisbeth Lipps, Rotterdam
- Norbert Prangenberg: Neue Arbeiten, Produzentengalerie, Hamburg

2003

- Malerbücher: Norbert Prangenberg, Galerie Rupert Walser, Munich, June 26–July 26

2003–2004

- Norbert Prangenberg, Galerie Hollenbach, Stuttgart, November 21, 2003 – February 3, 2004

2004

- Norbert Prangenberg: Skulpturen, Malerei, Zeichnungen, Galerie Karsten Greve, Cologne, April 23–May 27

2004–2005

- Norbert Prangenberg: Retrospektive der Zeichnungen, Aquarelle und Gouachen, 1978–2004, Kaiser Wilhelm Museum, Krefeld, Germany, October 23, 2004 – January 23, 2005

2005

- Norbert Prangenberg: Zeichnungen, 1978–2004, Staatliche Kunsthalle Karlsruhe, Germany, September 3–October 16
- Norbert Prangenberg, Galerie Rupert Walser, Munich, November 11–December 17

2006

- Norbert Prangenberg: Malerei, Museum Katharinenhof, Kranenburg, Germany
- Norbert Prangenberg: Sculpture, Peinture, Dessin, Galerie Karsten Greve, Paris, September 9–October 14

2007

- Norbert Prangenberg: Wasser zu Wein, Gold zu Stroh, Produzentengalerie, Hamburg, May 25–July 28

2008

- Norbert Prangenberg: Venustas et Fortuna, Kunstmuseum Kloster Unser Lieben Frauen, Magdeburg, Germany, March 9–June 22
- Norbert Prangenberg, Temporäre Galerie Schloss Neersen, Willich, Germany, April 6–May 4
- Über und Über – oder: Wer malt den Mücken die Flügel, Kunstverein Lippstadt, Germany, April 27–June 15
- Norbert Prangenberg: Neue Bilder, Galerie Karsten Greve, Cologne, July 25–September 13

2009

- Norbert Prangenberg: Die Liebe Farbe, Galerie Rupert Walser, Munich, January 16–March 13
- Norbert Prangenberg: Neue Arbeiten, Galerie Ebbers, Kranenburg, Germany, September 20–November 7
- Norbert Prangenberg: Esculturas, Pinturas y Dibujos, Galeria Manuel Ojeda, Gran Canaria, Spain, November 20–December 24

2010

- Norbert Prangenberg: Paintings, Betty Cuningham Gallery, New York, April 1–May 22
- Norbert Prangenberg: Skulpturen, 7 Hours, Berlin, September 17–October 16
- Norbert Prangenberg: New Paintings, Ancient & Modern, London, October 7–November 20

2011

- Norbert Prangenberg, Galerie am Bergkerk, Deventer, Netherlands, April 30–June 30
- Norbert Prangenberg, Galerie Hollenbach, Stuttgart, May 30–July 22
- Norbert Prangenberg: Kiss the Beast, Galerie Fons Welters, Amsterdam, June 25–July 31
- Norbert Prangenberg: Kiss the Biest, Galerie Barbara Gross, Munich, July 22–October 15

2012

- Norbert Prangenberg: Arbeit, 1980–2012, Galerie Karsten Greve, Cologne, September 7–November 11

2012–2013

- Norbert Prangenberg: Winterreise, Städtisches Kunstmuseum Spendhaus Reutlingen, Germany, October 20, 2012 – January 13, 2013; Städtische Galerie Villa Zanders, Bergisch Gladbach, Germany, January 20–July 4, 2013; Museum Gogh, Germany, June 23–August 25, 2013

2013

- Norbert Prangenberg: Opere, 1980–2010, Galerie Harry Zellweger, Carabietta, Switzerland, January 2–April 13
- Figuren + Bilder, Galerie Barbara Gross, Munich, January 8–March 2
- Norbert Prangenberg: In Memoriam, Galerie Hollenbach, Stuttgart, September 19–November 15

2014

- Norbert Prangenberg: The Last Works, Garth Greenan Gallery, New York, February 27–April 5

2016–2017

- Norbert Prangenberg: Skulptur, Galerie Karsten Greve, Cologne, November 4, 2016 – January 7, 2017

2017

- Norbert Prangenberg: Figuren, Garth Greenan Gallery, New York, March 2–April 8, 2017

=== Group exhibitions ===
1981

- Neue Sammlung, Museum Haus Lange/Haus Esters, Krefeld, Germany

1982

- Documenta 7, Kassel, Germany, June 19–September 28

1983

- Skulptur und Farbe, Gesellschaft für Aktuelle Kunst, Bremen, August 14–October 16

1984

- Förderpreis des Landes Nordrhein-Westfalen, Kunsthalle Bielefeld, Germany, June 3–July 29
- Kunstlandschaft BRD/Region Köln, Gesellschaft für Aktuelle Kunst, Bremen, June 16–July 8

1985

- Bremer Kunstpreis 1985, Kunsthalle Bremen, September 29–November 3

1986

- 6th Biennale of Sydney: Origins, Originality + Beyond, May 16–June 17
- Papier und Skulptur: Zwischen Fläche und Dreidimensionalität, Gesellschaft für Aktuelle Kunst, Bremen, August 31–September 30

1987

- Wechselströme: Kontemplation, Expression, Konstruktion, Bonner Kunstverein, Bonn, January 6–March 22

1987–1988

- Hans von Marées und die Moderne in Deutschland, Kunsthalle Bielefeld, Germany, October 25, 1987 – January 10, 1988; Kunstmuseum Winterthur, Germany, January 31–April 4, 1988

1988

- Mit Messer und Eisen: Holz- und Linolschnitte der Gegenwart, Städtisches Museum Schloss Morsbroich, Leverkusen, Germany, October 12–November 20

1989

- Cologneer Kunst, Kunstforeningen, Copenhagen, Denmark

1990

- Fritz Klemm, Jürgen Partenheimer, Norbert Prangenberg, Goethe-Institut, London, September 27–November 17
- Pidder Auberger: Holzschnitte/Norbert Prangenberg: Linolschnitte, Kulturforum Alte Post, Neuss, Germany, October 5–28
- Position der Zeichnung, Galerie Hake, Wiesbaden, Germany

1991

- Kunst als Grenzüberschreitung: John Cage und die Moderne, Bayerische Staatsgemäldesammlung, Neue Pinakothek, Munich, July 18–October 27

1992

- Drawn in the ’90s, Katonah Museum of Art, New York, June 14–August 9
- Werkformen: Skulpturen von Malern, Galerie Pfefferle, Munich, September 11–October 30

1995

- Junge Kunst in Bremer Privatbesitz, Gesellschaft für Aktuelle Kunst, Bremen, February 5–March 19
- Das Abenteuer der Malerei, Kunstverein für die Rheinland und Westfalen, Düsseldorf, May 14–June 25; Württembergischer Kunstverein, Stuttgart, May 18–July 2

1996

- Skulpturenproject, Alden Biesen, Bilzen, Belgium

1996–1997

- Zeitströmunge: Kunst der Gegenwart aus der Sammlung der Niedersächsischen Sparkassenstiftung, Sprengel Museum, Hannover, Germany, May 22–August 18, 1996; Kunsthalle Rostock, Germany, December 1, 1996–February 2, 1997; Neues Museum Weserburg, Bremen, April 18–June 11, 1997

1997

- Augenzeugen: die Sammlung Hanck, Museum Kunstpalast, Düsseldorf, April 18–August 3

1997–1998

- Querschnitt: Deutscher Holzschnitt Heute, Städtische Galerie Villa Zanders, Bergisch Gladbach, Germany, August 30–November 16, 1997; Städtische Galerie “Die Welle,” Iserlohn, Germany, January 24–April 13, 1998

1998–1999

- Leaf Spine, Word Sign: Künstlerbücher, Kunstmuseum Bonn, Germany, October 29, 1998 – January 3, 1999; Staatliche Kunsthalle, Karlsruhe, December 2, 1998 – April 25, 1999

1999

- Schöpfung, Heiliggeistkirche, Munich, May 9–July 4; Karmelitenkirche, Munich, May 9–July 4; Diözesan-museum Freising, Germany, May 9–October 10
- Die Kraft der Poesie, PCC Kunstraum, Weimar, May 14–December 14

2000

- Kunst aus den achtziger Jahren, Galerie Andreas Baumgartl, Munich, October 5–December 3
- Zeichnungen und Installationen, Galerie Gaby Kraushaar, Düsseldorf, October 20–December 12

2001

- Die Sammlung Lauffs I, Museum Haus Lange/Haus Esters, Krefeld, Germany, March 4–April 29

2002

- Drei Zeichner: Paco Knöller, Norbert Prangenberg, Hanns Schimansky, Galerie Thomas Schulte, Berlin, January 27–March 9

2002–2003

- Raum für Malerei/The Painting Room, Kaiser Wilhelm Museum, Krefeld, Germany March 24, 2002 – March 1, 2003

2003

- 2nd World Ceramic Biennale, Icheon World Ceramic Center, South Korea, September 1–October 30

2004

- Die weite Welt: Künstlerbücher, Mappenwerke, Zeichnungen, Museum Ludwig, Cologne, March 13–May 16

2005

- Bilanz in zwei Akten, Kunstverein Hannover, Germany, June 11–August 21
- Bilder vom Stein, Pinakothek der Moderne, Munich, August 4–October 2

2006

- Painted in Munich, Galerie Rupert Walser, Munich, May 19–July 28

2007

- Mandorla, 7 Hours, Berlin, September 22–November 5
- Slow Food, Künstlerhaus Bethanien, Berlin

2007–2008

- Als wäre nichts gesagt, Museum Haus Lange/Haus Esters, Krefeld, Germany, July 8, 2007 – January 27, 2008

2008

- 3. Biennale der Zeichnung, Kunstverein Esslingen, Germany, May 31–August 7
- Quattro Pro: Kornbrist, Prangenberg, Reineking, Zeniuk, Galerie Rupert Walser, Munich, June 13–August 2
- Farbholzschnitte von Altenbourg bis Wittig, Galerie am Sachsenplatz, Leipzig, July 22–August 30

2009

- On Paper, Galerie Karsten Greve, Paris, January 10–March 14
- Die Gegenwart der Linie, Staatliche Graphische Sammlung, Pinakothek der Moderne, Munich, March 19–June 21

2009–2010

- Der Holzschnitt im 20. und 21. Jahrhundert, Städtisches Kunstmuseum Spendhaus Reutlingen, Germany, October 10, 2009 – January 10, 2010

2010

- On Paper II, Galerie Karsten Greve, Paris, March 17–April 10
- Wasser/Farbe, Museum Liner, Appenzell, Switzerland, March 21–June 27
- Sugar Babies II, Galerie Ebbers, Kranenburg, Germany, June 20–September 12

2011

- Archetypes, Timothy Taylor Gallery, London, May 6–27

2011–2012

- Keramik in der Gegenwartskunst, Museum Villa Rot, Burgrieden-Rot, Germany, October 2, 2011 – February 5, 2012
- 15 Jahre Galerie Hollenbach: Arbeiten zum Jubiläum, Galerie Hollenbach, Stuttgart, November 25, 2011 – January 20, 2012

2012

- Interview, Horton Gallery, Berlin, January 6–February 18
- Burning Colours, Hopstreet Gallery, Brussels, January 28–March 10
- Norbert Prangenberg & Chris Newman, 7 Hours, Berlin, April 13–May 25

2013

- Hans Delfosse, Manfred Förster, Norbert Prangenberg, Inge Schmidt: Atelier, Galerie Konrad Mönter, Meerbusch-Osterath, September 7–October 5

2014

- Bertenburg, Modersohn, Prangenberg, ph-projects, January 25–March 1
- Keramische Räume, Museum Morsbroich, Leverkusen, Germany, May 25–August 31

2015

- Terrapolis, French School at Athens, Greece, May 26–July 26

2016

- Haptic, Alexander Gray Associates, New York, July 7–August 12

2016–2017

- Art Basel Miami Beach, Public 2016: Ground Control, The Bass Museum of Contemporary Art, Miami, November 30, 2016 – March 15, 2017
