= Temporary exhibitions at the Art Gallery of New South Wales =

This is a list of unique temporary exhibitions held at the Art Gallery of New South Wales, Sydney Australia, organised chronologically and grouped by decade.

Not listed here are the temporary exhibitions that the Gallery hosts regularly, such as the long running ArtExpress, Archibald Prize, the Sulman Prize, Wynne Prize and Dobell art prizes.

Touring exhibitions are marked with an asterisk (*).

== 1900s ==
Year	Exhibition Dates	Exhibition Title	Exhibition Summary	Exhibition Curator	Exhibition Catalogue	Press/Reviews/Notes
1906	1906–03 to 1906-04 (exhibited for 25 days)	The Light of the World A painting by William Holman Hunt	Exhibition of a life size replica painted in 1900 of an original (in Keble College, Oxford) painted by the artist in 1852, "in accordance with a practice he has already adopted"			The artist was inspired by a passage from the book of Revelation (3:20): "Behold, I stand at the door and knock: if any man hear my voice, and open the door, I will come and sup with him, and he with me." Overall, 302,183 people viewed the painting. By 31 March, 158,000 persons had seen it and by 5 April daily attendance had exceeded 11,000. The average daily attendance set records which remain unbroken.

== 1970s ==
Year	Exhibition Dates	Exhibition Title	Exhibition Summary	Exhibition Curator	Exhibition Catalogue	Press/Reviews/Notes
1975	1975–04 to 1975-05	Modern Masters: Manet to Matisse	Exhibition of 110 paintings organised under the auspices of the International Council of the Museum of Modern Art, New York, chronicling nearly a century of European art.	William S. Lieberman	ISBN 978-0-87070-444-4	The Sydney Morning Herald described it as "quite simply, the most important exhibition ever to visit Australia...Profound thanks", and it was seen by more than 400,000 visitors in Sydney and Melbourne before going to New York.

== 1980s ==
Year	Exhibition Dates	Exhibition Title	Exhibition Summary	Exhibition Curator	Exhibition Catalogue	Press/Reviews/Notes
1987	1987-04-12 to 1987-04-19	Australian Sculpture 1890-1919	The Gallery's early Australian sculpture collection			
	1987-? to 1987-08-03	Harry Callahan photographs	110 original prints by Harry Callahan	Sandra Byron		
	1987-? to 1987-02-23	Surface for Reflexion 2	23 Painters whose careers began in 1960s			
	1987-? to 1987-04-20	America: Art and the West	The changing idea of the frontier – a perspective into American art and cultural history over a period of 150 years	Gallery Education (Terence Maloon?)		
	1987-03-06 to 1987-04-12	Australia: Art and the West	Parallels in Australian art to themes in America: Art and the West	Gallery Education (Terence Maloon?)		
	1987-03-14 to 1987-04-18	Skinner Prout in Australia	Works of the Australian colonial artist John Skinner Prout (1805–1876)	Wendy Symonds		
	1987-05-01 to 1987-05-31	Acquisitions from the Komon, Salkauskas and Horton Funds	Works acquired by the Henry Salkauskas Contemporary Art Purchase Fund, the Rudy Komon Memorial Fund and the Mervyn Horton Bequest Fund			
	1987-05-20 to 1987-07-05	Yves Saint Laurent – retrospective	Homage to the achievements in fashion of Yves St Laurent	Originally curated by Diana Vreeland from Vogue for the Metropolitan Museum in New York in 1983.		
	1987-06-05 to 1987-07-19	William Delafield Cook: mid-career survey	A selected 28 works of the artist's British and Australian career			
	1987-? to 1987-09-20	Surveying the work of the great Italian architect Filippo Brunelleschi (1377-1446)	Measured drawings, scale models and photographs to demonstrate physical manifestations of the political and social values of 15th century Florence			
	1987-?	Lines of Fire (Linea di Fuoco)	Installation as part of Carnivale '87 exploring the themes of State terrorism. Photographs, texts, sculptures, slides and sound	Dennis Del Fvero and FILEF (a federation of Sydney-based Italian migrant workers and their families)		
	1987-07-24 to 1987-09-15	Colin Lanceley 1961–1987 retrospective		a published book contains an essay by Robert Hughes		The Art Gallery Society arranged a viewing of Lanceley's studio to its members on 27 November 2010.
	1987-08-12 to 1987-09-27	Sir Sidney Nolan: Landscape and Legends – a retrospective exhibition 1937-1987	200 works from public and private collections in Australia and England			See interview with AGNSW's William Wright
	1987-11 to 1988-01-03	Sighting References: Ciphers, Systems and Codes	Participatory exhibition of art works and critical writing	Gary Sangster	ISBN 0-9589154-3-1	
	1987-10-16 to 1987-11-29	Mayakovsky: 20 years of work	First substantial body of work from major period of 20th century Russian art shown to Australian public	Originally held in Moscow 1930, curated by Vladimir Mayakovsky (1893–1930), Russian poet of the Revolutionary Era		
1988	1988-01-01 to 1988-01-31	ANZ Bicentennial Art Commissions	Works commissioned by State Galleries and funded by ANZ etc.			
	to 1988-02-14	Munakata	80 works by Japanese printmaker Munakato Shiko (1903–1975)			
	1988-02-24 to 1988-05-15	CSR Collection	Corporate commission of six photographers to represent CSR Refinery at Pyrmont (about 350 photographs)	Wendy Symonds		
	1988-02-10 to 1988-03-13	Moët & Chandon *	Second annual Moët & Chandon Touring Exhibition to encourage and promote contemporary Australian art.			
	1988-03-10 to 1988-05-01	Masterpieces from the Hermitage	Western European paintings from Botticelli to Picasso		Prunster	
	1988-03-04 to 1988-05-01	The Artist and the Patron	A survey of colonial art and patronage	Patricia R. McDonald	ISBN 0-7305-4745-0	
	1988-05-17 to 1988-06-26	Art Knits	Knitwear by Australian designers	Wendy Symonds(?)		
	1988-05-18 to 1988-07-03	The Australian Biennale 1988	A survey of 20th century art – paintings, sculptures, performances, installations, from 1940 to 1988			
	1988-06-01 to 1988 07-16	A Study of Genius: Master Drawings and Watercolours from the Collection of Her Majesty the Queen	Fifty drawings and watercolours representing the collection in the Royal Library at Windsor Castle			
	1988-07-05 to 1988-09-15	NZ XI	Survey of 11 contemporary NZ artists – painting, sculpture, installation, photography			
	1988-07-27 to 1988-10-02	Terra Australis: The Furthest Shore	European view of Australia from the notions of the 15th century to discovery	William Eisler	ISBN 0-642-13464-2	
	1988-07-26 to 1988-11-09	Japanese Art from the Collection	Japanese screens, hanging scrolls, ceramics and lacquer from the Gallery's collection			
	1988-09-17 to 1988-10-30	Contemporary Chinese Painting	Selection from Gallery's holdings of modern, traditional style paintings	Jackie Menzies		
	1988-09-30 to 1988-11-13	Made in Havana	Contemporary Cuban art – Paintings, installations, objects and photographs by nine contemporary Cuban artists	Charles Merewether		
	1988-08-24 to 1988-09-18	Australian Video Festival	Video installation in association with the Australian Video Festival			
	1988-10-21 to 1988-11-27	The Great Australian Art Exhibition	For the occasion of the Bicentenary – Comprehensive review of Australian art over 200 years	Barry Pierce		
	1988-10-15 to 1988-12-11	Venice: The Renaissance	Italian paintings on loan to the Gallery to coincide with the visit of the President of Italy			
	1988-11-09 to 1988-12-11	David Moore – Fifty Years of Photographs	Retrospective	Sandra Byron		
	1988-12-20 to 1989-01-26	Masterpieces from Tokyo's Idemitsu Collection	105 Japanese ceramics from the Idemitsu Museum of Arts	Jackie Menzies		

== 1990s ==
Year	Exhibition Dates	Exhibition Title	Exhibition Summary	Exhibition Curator	Exhibition Catalogue	Press/Reviews/Notes
1991	1991- ? to 1991-02-17	Contemporary Japanese ceramics	New works by Japan's leading traditional and avant-garde potters, selected from the annual Asahi Ceramic Art Exhibition			
	1991-02-02 to 1991-04-07	Roger Kemp etchings	First major exhibition of Kemp's etchings			
	1991 – ? to 1991-02-23	Contemporary Aboriginal Art from the Robert Holmes à Court Collection	Cross-section of contemporary Aboriginal art spanning the continent			
	1991-? to 1991-02-03	Bette Mifsud	Installation of large phototransparencies			
	1991-? to 1991-02-17	Treasures from the Shanghai Museum	Works of Ancient Chinese art from the collections of the Shanghai Museum, including ceramics and tomb figures from the Han and Tang dynasties			
	1991-? to 1991-03-10	Swiss Artists in Australia 1777-1991	In celebration of the 700th anniversary of Switzerland, exhibition focuses on seven important Swiss-Australian artists – John Webber (1751-1793), Wilbraham Liardet (1799-1878), Nicholas Chevalier (1828-1901), Louis Buvelot (1814-1888), Sali Herman (1898-1993), Paul Haefliger (1914-1982) and Joe Felber (1915-?)	Barry Pierce		
	1991-? to 1991-03-31	Machina: Persona	Arthur Wicks installation – Four working machines as installation and performance: Helicopter, Boat, Car and two Figures	Wendy Symonds		
	1991-02-16 to 1991-06-16	The Magic of the Paris Opera: 300 years of French style	220 historical pieces – costumes, jewels, drawings and stage models from the collection of the 300-year history of the Paris Opera. Coincides with France's Year of the Art of Living.			
	1991-02-26 to 1991-04-21	Elwyn Lynn	Retrospective – key examples of Lynn's painting and collage	Peter Pinson		
	1991-03-20 to 1991-05-26	Albert Tucker retrospective	160 works by Australian expressionist Albert Tucker. Exhibition from the National Gallery of Victoria.		Catalogue NGV 1990	
	1991-? to 1991-04-14	International photographs from the permanent collection	Photographs from renowned masters of 19th and 20th centuries including Lewis Hine, Muybridge, Brassai, Brandt, and Cartier-Bresson. Selected images from 1840s to 1980s. Includes striking examples of the British and European pictorialist movements as well as formally abstracted images such as by Edward Weston (1886-1958), André Kertész (1894-1895) and Man Ray (1890-1976).	Sandra Byron		
	1991-04-27 to 1991-06-10	Three Installations: Lucas, Mellick and Owen	Noelene Lucas, Ross Mellick and Robert Owen			
	1991-04-19 to 1991-06-30	Max Pam	Mid-career survey of the work of contemporary Australian photographer Max Pam	Sandra Byron		
	1991-04-13 to 1991-07-07	Nineteenth century Australian watercolours from the collection	From colonial masters to the Heidelberg School, includes works by John Glover, Louis Buvelot, Arthur Streeton, Julian Ashton and John Peter Russell. A sequel to the show 20th century Australian watercolours exhibition of 1989. As part of the exhibition, Paper Conservators Rosemary Peel and Mark Stryker have prepared a special display concerned with the materials used by 19th century watercolour painters.	Hendrik Kolenberg		"Two of the works included vied for first prize in John Sands’ Art Competition for 1881. Watercolours by Charles E. Hern and W.C. Piguenit were eventually awarded first and second prize respectively and purchased for the gallery [AGNSW]. In the cautious words of the judges E.L.Montefiore, E. du Faur and J. Garbett, reported in the ‘Sydney Daily Telegraph’ 19 November 1881: "the first prize to ‘Govett's Leap’ as being an excellent representation of a well known and very characteristic scene, familiar to all tourists in New South Wales, although in purely artistic qualities they do not consider it equal to ‘Mt Isa, Lake St Clair’ – a Tasmanian scene which is less suitable for reproduction, to which they have given the second premium."
	1991-06-21 to 1991-07-14	Moët & Chandon Touring Exhibition *	Fifth exhibition – works by 18 young Australians			
	1991-07-06 to 1991-09-15	Australian photographs from the collection				
	1991-? to 1991-08-18	Wim Delvoye Installation	A sculptural installation by the young Belgian artist, Wim Delvoye			This artist subsequently captured visitors' attention with his work Cloaca 2010 exhibited in the newly opened MONA in Hobart, Tasmania
	1991-08-07 to 1991-09-15	Australian Perspecta 1991	Australian photographs from the permanent collection – sixth in a series of exhibitions dedicated to the exploration of Australian contemporary art, included three dimensional works by 40 artists included Lin Onus's Hills Hoist. Includes an outdoor component in the Penrith Region curated by Campbell Gray.	Victoria Lynn?	Catalogue	
	1991-07-13 to 1991-09-29	Piety and Paganism:	Christian and Classical themes in European art Focusing on 16th and 17th century	Nicholas Draffin		
	1991-? to 1991-10-06	Danny Matthys installation	Installation by Belgian artist working with conceptual art forms since 1970s			
	1991-06-06 to 1991-08-25	Bohemians in the Bush: the artists' camps of Mosman	Brings together for the first time the artists involved with the camps, including Tom Roberts, Arthur Streeton, Charles Conder, Julian Ashton, Livingston Hopkins, Henry Fullwood, Alfred Daplyn, Girolami Nerli, Benjamin Minns, Sydney Long and Lister Lister.	Linda Slutzkin	ISBN 0-7305-8665-0	
	1991-09-04 to 1991-11-17	In Our Time: the world as seen by Magnum Photographers	300 images by 60 photographers – celebrating the achievements of Magnum Photos Inc., world's oldest and most renowned co-operative of photo-journalists, including works by founding members Robert Capa, Henri Cartier-Bresson, David Seymour and George Roger.			
	1991-09-10 to 1991-11-10	Contemporary Aboriginal Women's Art	Painting, printmaking, sculpture, ceramics, weaving, carving, body ornament, photography, film, video and performance, traditional and urban, from all areas of Australia	Vivonne Thwaites	ISBN 0-9595800-6-9	
	1991-11-02 to 1991-12-15	Geoff Weary video installation	for the Electronic Media Arts festival. In three parts, focusing on Japan: a shrine to Kamikaze pilots; a gathering to mourn a dead emperor; and the Tokyo Stock Exchange.			
	1991-? to 1991-11-05	Tony Twigg and Euan Upston	Artist Twigg and dramatist Upston collaborating to present performance and sculptural installation using large-scale puppets			
	1991-09-22 to 1992-01-12	Masterpieces from the Guggenheim: Cézanne to Pollock*	Major exhibition of modern masterpieces from the Solomon R. Guggenheim in New York and the Peggy Guggenheim Museum in Venice. 111 works. Shown in Venice, Madrid, Tokyo and Sydney	Krens, Thomas		
	1991-10-19 to 1992-01-05	Divine and Courtly Life	Indian miniature painting	Dr Jim Masselos – Reader in History at Sydney University (honorary consultant to the exhibition)		
	1991-12-07 to 1992-01-19	The Life and Work of Wolfgang Sievers	Retrospective of one of Australia's most distinguished photographers			
	? to 1992-01-27	Chinese paintings from the Collection				
	1991-11-19 to 1992-02-16	The Australian Decorative Arts Collection	200 works of Sydney craftspeople, specifically members of the Society of Arts and Crafts of NSW (founded in 1906 under the influence of the English Arts and Crafts movement) including Elizabeth Soderberg, Ada Newman, Ethel Atkinson and Rhoda Wager			
	1991-12-20 to 1992-01-27	Chinese snuff bottles	More than 200 Chinese snuff bottles from several Hong Kong Collections	Jackie Menzies		
1992	1992-01-11 to 1992-02-17	Large drawings?				
	1992-01-25 to 1992-03-08	Through their own eyes: the personal portfolios of Ansel Adams and Edward Weston	Personal selections of the work of their own works by American photographers Ansel Adams (1902-1984) and Edward Weston (1886-1958)			
	1992-03-05 to 1992-?	Rupert Bunny	Retrospective			
	1992-04-? to 1992-?	Francis Lymburner	Artist of 1940s and 1950s			
	1992-05-? to	Henry Moore	Monumental sculptures, drawings and prints			
	1992-05-08 to 1992-?	John Olsen retrospective	Highlights from the foremost artist of the Australian landscape	Wendy Symonds		
	1992-? to 1992-?	André Kertész – Form and Feeling	Works from the influential body of avant-garde work created in Paris from 1925			
	1992-05-? to 1992-08-?	Dora Ohlfsen – Focus on the Collection	Australian Neoclassical sculptor			
	1992-06-15 to 1992-?	Seven Master Printmakers: Innovations in the 80s	Works by the American Pop generation grown up from the Museum of Modern Art in New York			
	1992-? to ?	Sydney and its Artists	Celebrating Australia's Sesquicentenary			
	1992-? to ?	Animals in Art				
	1992-07-08 to 1992-08-16	??	Aboriginal art exhibition showing relationship between Aborigines and the land			
	1992-8-? to 1992-?	Frederick McCubbin	Works of co-founder of the Heidelberg School			
	1992-09-04 to 1992-11-22	Immortal China	Paintings, bronzes and decorative arts around the theme of immortality			
	1992-12-? to 1992-?	Biennale of international contemporary art		Tony Bond, Asian component selected by Jackie Menzies		
1996	Multiple Pleasures	Richard Tipping	Foyer exhibition of sculpture multiples	Anthony Bond	Multiple Pleasures postcard pack, 22 cards, edition 600	An associated event of the Biennale of Sydney 1996
1997	1997-12-06 to 1998-02-22	Orientalism: David to Klee	Aesthetic responses to travel	Roger Benjamin	ISBN 0-7313-1344-5	

== 2000s ==
Year	Exhibition Dates	Exhibition Title	Exhibition Summary	Exhibition Curator	Exhibition Catalogue	Press/Reviews/Notes
2008	2008-10-11 to 2009-01-26	Monet and the Impressionists	Impressionist paintings from the Museum of Fine Arts, Boston	George T. M. Shackelford	ISBN 978-1-74174-030-1	More than 225,000 people attended the exhibition. Terence Maloon
	2008-12-12 to 2009-02-13	Genji - The World of the Shining Prince	Tribute to The Tale of Genji by Murasaki Shikibu (c1008)	Khanh Trinh	ISBN 978-1-74174-034-9	
2009	2009-03-05 to 2009-06-08	Korean Dreams	Selection of paintings dating to the Joseon dynasty (1302–1902)	Jackie Menzies	ISBN 978-1-74174-035-6	
	2009-06-05 to 2009-08-23	Intensely Dutch	Post-war Dutch artists, including Bram Bogart and Theo Kuijpers who was present at the opening	Henrik Kolenberg	ISBN 978-1-74174-041-7	Kuijpers' visit to Australia during this exhibition inspired further "Australian works" of "unrestrained physicality and masculinity" and "vibrant optimism".
	2009-07-02 to 2009-10-11	Silk Ikats from Central Asia	Central Asian Islamic tie-dyed textiles	Lucien de Guise		
	2009-08-08 to 2009-10-25	Printmaking in the Age of Romanticism	Prints on a variety of subjects executed in a range of printmaking media from the Gallery's permanent collection	Peter Raissis	ISBN 978-1-74174-048-6	
	2009-08-? to 2009-12-18	The Dreamers	Works of eight distinguished Aboriginal artists from the Gallery's collection	Cara Pinchbeck		
	2009-10-02 to 2009-02-14	40 Years: Kaldor Public Art Projects	Archival material, photographs, television footage and correspondence over four decades of Kaldor's bringing avant-garde art to Australia	Anthony Bond		
	2009-10-29 to 2010- 01-26	Garden & Cosmos	Recently discovered Indian paintings created between 17th and 19th centuries under the patronage of the Marwar court at Jodhpur in Rajasthan	Jackie Menzies	ISBN 978-0-500-51443-6, ISBN 0-500-51443-7	
	2009-11-21 to 2010-02-21	Rupert Bunny: Artist in Paris	The works of Rupert Bunny including those from public and private collections in Australia and overseas	Deborah Edwards	ISBN 978-1-74174-047-9	Andrew Stephens
	2009-12-05 to 2010-02-21	6 Photographers	Photographs of Australia in 1940s and 1950s by Gordon Andrews, Kerry Dundas, Max Dupain, Hal Missingham, Axel Poignant, David Potts.	Elizabeth Maloney		John Huxley

== 2010s ==
Year	Exhibition Dates	Exhibition Title	Exhibition Summary	Exhibition Curator	Exhibition catalogue	Press/Reviews/Notes
2010	2010-02-13 to 2010-05-02	Hymn to Beauty – The Art of Utamaro	First survey of the art of Utamaro in Australia	Khánh Trinh	ISBN 978-1-74174-053-0	"...there is a breathtaking fluency in Utamaro's line ... it was only in the late 19th century, when the impressionists and post-impressionists became obsessed with these pieces, that a vogue was established in the west." Review by John McDonald
	2010-03-05 to 2010-05-23	Wilderness	Balnaves painting series of contemporary Australian art	Wayne Tunnicliffe	ISBN 978-1-74174-054-7	
	2010-05-20 to 2010-08-29	Victorian Visions – 19th Century Art from the John Schaeffer Collection	19th century art from the John Schaeffer collection	Richard Beresford	ISBN 978-1-74174-058-5	
	2010-06-26 to 2010-09-19	Paths to Abstraction	Tracing the links to abstract art	Terence Maloon	ISBN 978-1-74174-056-1	John McDonald
	2010-08-19 to 2010-11-07	The Indian Empire: Multiple Realities	Photographs from India under the British Raj	Jackie Menzies		Joyce Morgan
	2010-08-28 to 2011-02-13	Art + Soul	Indigenous Australian art from the AGNSW collection	Hetti Perkins	ISBN 978-0-522-85763-4	An exhibition that explores the diversity of Indigenous culture through three themes: ‘home and away’, ‘dreams and nightmares’ and ‘bitter and sweet’. Review by Jill Rowbotham
	2010-09-22 to 2010-12-05	David to Cézanne: master drawings from the Prat Collection, Paris	One hundred drawings exploring the development of French art over during 19th century	Peter Raissis	ISBN 978-1-74174-060-8	An exhibition from the Paris collection of Louis-Antoine Prat, who said in an interview that "Drawings are the first drafts of genius, the first emotions. That appeals to me." Review
	2010-12-02 to 2011-03-13	The First Emperor: China's Entombed Warriors	A panoramic view of the Qin dynasty from 13 museums in the Shaanxi province	Liu Yang	ISBN 978-1-74174-062-2	"The presentation, by the architect Richard Johnson, sets a new standard for exhibition design in this country, with the warriors displayed behind a low wall that allows us to get up close and see the statues with exceptional clarity." John McDonald Adam Fulton Janet Hawley
	2010-12-18 to 2011-02-27	Justin O'Brien:The Sacred Music of Colour	The first major retrospective of the artist's work since 1987 and the first since his death.	Barry Pearce and Natalie Wilson	ISBN 978-1-74174-061-5	The exhibition prompts the viewer to ask: "To what extent was the artist driven by a spiritual, as opposed to an aesthetic imperative? Which one is the servant of the other?"
2011						
	2011-03-16 to 2011-05-29	Photography & Place: Australian landscape photography	An exhibition that investigates the process of 'landscaping' between the 1970s and 2011	Vigen Galstyan	ISBN 978-1-74174-066-0	
	2011-06-18 to 2011-09-04	The poetry of drawing: Pre-Raphaelite Designs, Studies and Watercolours	Comprehensive and wide-ranging survey of Pre-Raphaelite drawings and watercolours, with works from the Birmingham Museum and Art Gallery supplemented by loans from public and private collections in Britain and Sydney.	Peter Raissis	ISBN 978-0-500-23881-3	
	2011-08-06 to 2011-11-06	The Mad Square – Modernity in German Art 1910-37	Over 200 diverse works exploring the ways in which German artists explored the modern world between the wars	Jacqueline Strecker	ISBN 978-1-74174-068-4	"Strecker has tried to present a broader picture of the Weimar years, showcasing its incredible artistic diversity." "It's about seeing. Really – frankly, fearlessly – seeing."
	2011-11-12 to 2012-03-25	Picasso: Masterpieces from the Musée National Picasso, Paris	150 important paintings, sculptures, prints and drawings	Anne Baldassari	ISBN 1-74174-074-6	"Numerous works in this exhibition that provide extraordinary insights in to Picasso's mind and personality." McDonald
	2011-09-24 to 2012-02-05	What's in a face? aspects of portrait photography	Works by Australian photographers, such as Paul Foelsche, Olive Cotton, Max Dupain, Carol Jerrems, Destiny Deacon, Darren Sylvester, Petrina Hicks and others, are placed in an international context, represented by Man Ray, Edward Weston, Iwao Yamawaki, Nan Goldin, Ben Cauchi and Loretta Lux.	Judy Annear		
2012						
	2012-05-11 to 2012-07-29	Australian Symbolism: The Art of Dreams	Works by Australian artists created in the last decades of the 19th century, including 70 paintings and sculptures by Charles Conder, Rupert Bunny, Sydney Long, Bertram Mackennal, George Lambert	Denise Mimmocchi	ISBN 978-1-741-74076-9	"Artists at home created their own work with a particularly Australian outlook" "A comprehensive review of a phenomenon that has often been ignored or misunderstood"
