= Kosme de Barañano y Letamendía =

Spanish museologist and professor

Kosme María de Barañano y Letamendía
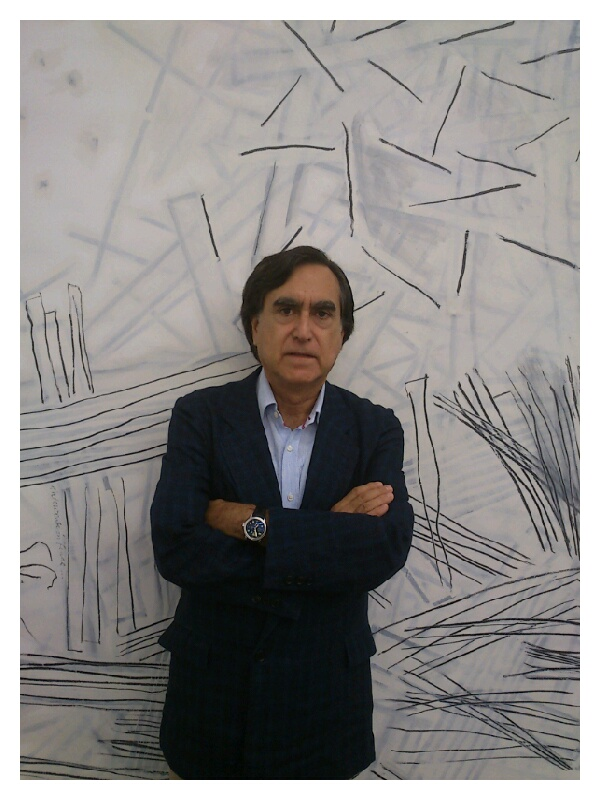
- Born: 1952 (age 73–74); Bilbao, Spain

Kosme de Barañano y Letamendía (born 1952) is a Spanish museologist and professor. He has curated and edited catalogs of more than fifty exhibitions in European and American museums. He is considered an expert in the work of Eduardo Chillida.

Interested in art from a young age, his first mentor was the Basque painter José María de Ucelay.

In the museum field, he held a fellowship at the Hirshhorn Museum and Sculpture Garden in Washington DC. In 1990 he was appointed deputy director of the Reina Sofía Museum, and was part of the Board of Trustees from 1998 until 2006. In May 2000 he was appointed director of the Valencian Institute of Modern Art, a position he held until 2004. In addition, he has been part of advisory committees such as those of the Museo del Prado and the Museo de Bellas Artes de Bilbao. He was a member of the Advisory Commission for the creation of the Guggenheim Museum Bilbao, and has curated exhibitions at the Venice Biennale.

Among his exhibitions at the Accademia Gallery of Venice, he dedicated one to the abstract-figurative artist Philip Guston in 2017.

He was also the curator of the exhibition Baselitz-Academy, dedicated to Georg Baselitz, being the first exhibition of a living artist held by the institution in 2019.

In 1990, he curated an exhibition of Alberto Giacometti with 380 works, including sculpture, painting and drawing for the Reina Sofía Museum. In 1992 he did a retrospective of Chillida with 300 works at the Palacio de Miramar in San Sebastián.

In the academic field, he was a researcher at the University of Heidelberg, full-professor of art history at the University of the Basque Country, and full-professor of Methodology of art history at the Miguel Hernández University. In addition, he was a visiting professor at the IUAV di Venezia, the Venezia-Verona and the University of Berlin.

Aside from these, he has collaborated with written media such as the newspapers El País, La Gaceta del Norte and El Correo, or magazines like Saioak, Expansión, Mundáiz and Muga. He has been the Art Critic in the newspaper El Mundo.

In 2019 he donated his library to the Universitat Jaume I. In 2021 he became, together with Miquel Navarro, at the Real Academia of San Carlos a numerary academician.
