= Kunstmuseen Krefeld =

German museums

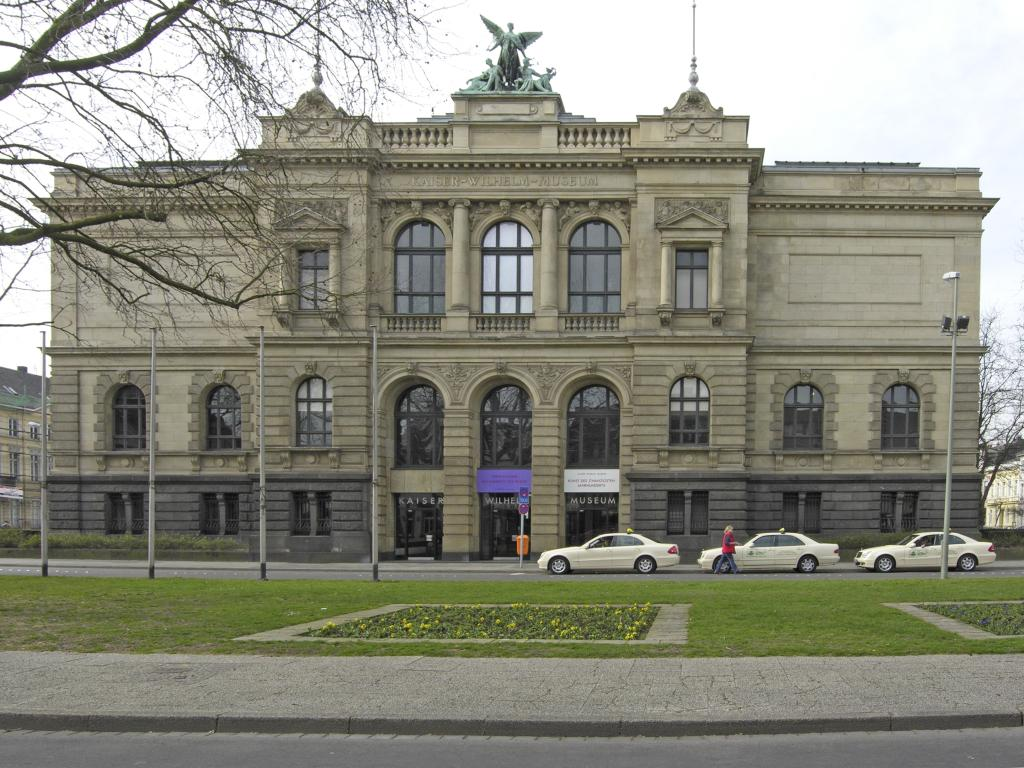
- Kaiser Wilhelm Museum, 2005
- Established: 1888
- Location: Krefeld
- Type: Museum of modern art
- Director: Katia Baudin
- Website: www.kunstmuseenkrefeld.de

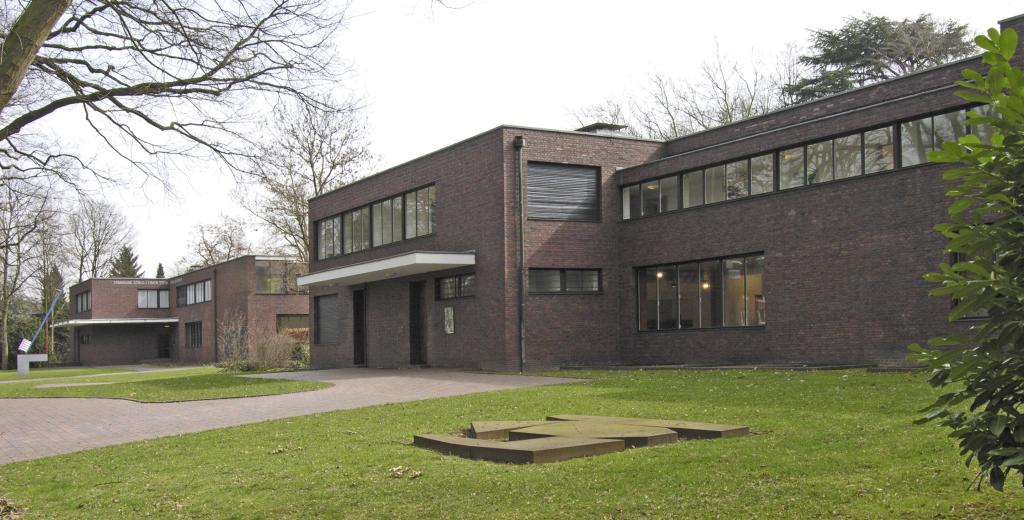
Haus Lange and Haus Esters, March 2005

The Kunstmuseen Krefeld (Krefeld Art Museums) is collection of three art museums in Krefeld, Germany. and particularly dedicated to modern and contemporary art. Comprising the Kaiser Wilhelm Museum, the Haus Lange and Haus Esters, the museums since the late 1950s have risen to international prominence. Katia Baudin, former deputy director of the Museum Ludwig in Cologne, has headed the institution since September 2016.

== History ==
=== Beginning ===
In January 1882, the Craftsmen's and Education Association stated in a citizens' meeting: "It is desirable that a museum be established in Crefeld that represents the interests of the arts and crafts in particular". A museum commission was then founded, and in the following year, a museum association. It had 32 members, including the mayor, the district administrator, the school board and several silk manufacturers. In the same year, the first exhibition Kunstwerke aus Krefelder Privatbesitz was held in the Stadthalle. In the 1880s, the museum association primarily sought donations, objects and paintings as the basis for a museum building. In 1884, the city of Krefeld made the former school at Westwall 60 available free of charge. As early as 1897, the monetary value of the collection was estimated at 112,000 Reichsmark. This included a Roman department, ironware from the 15th to the 18th century, Italian metalwork, furniture from the Lower Rhine, Rhenish stoneware, pottery, German and Dutch faiences, South German and French furniture of the Rococo and the Empire, Italian furniture of the Renaissance, and a painting gallery.

=== The museum at Karlsplatz ===
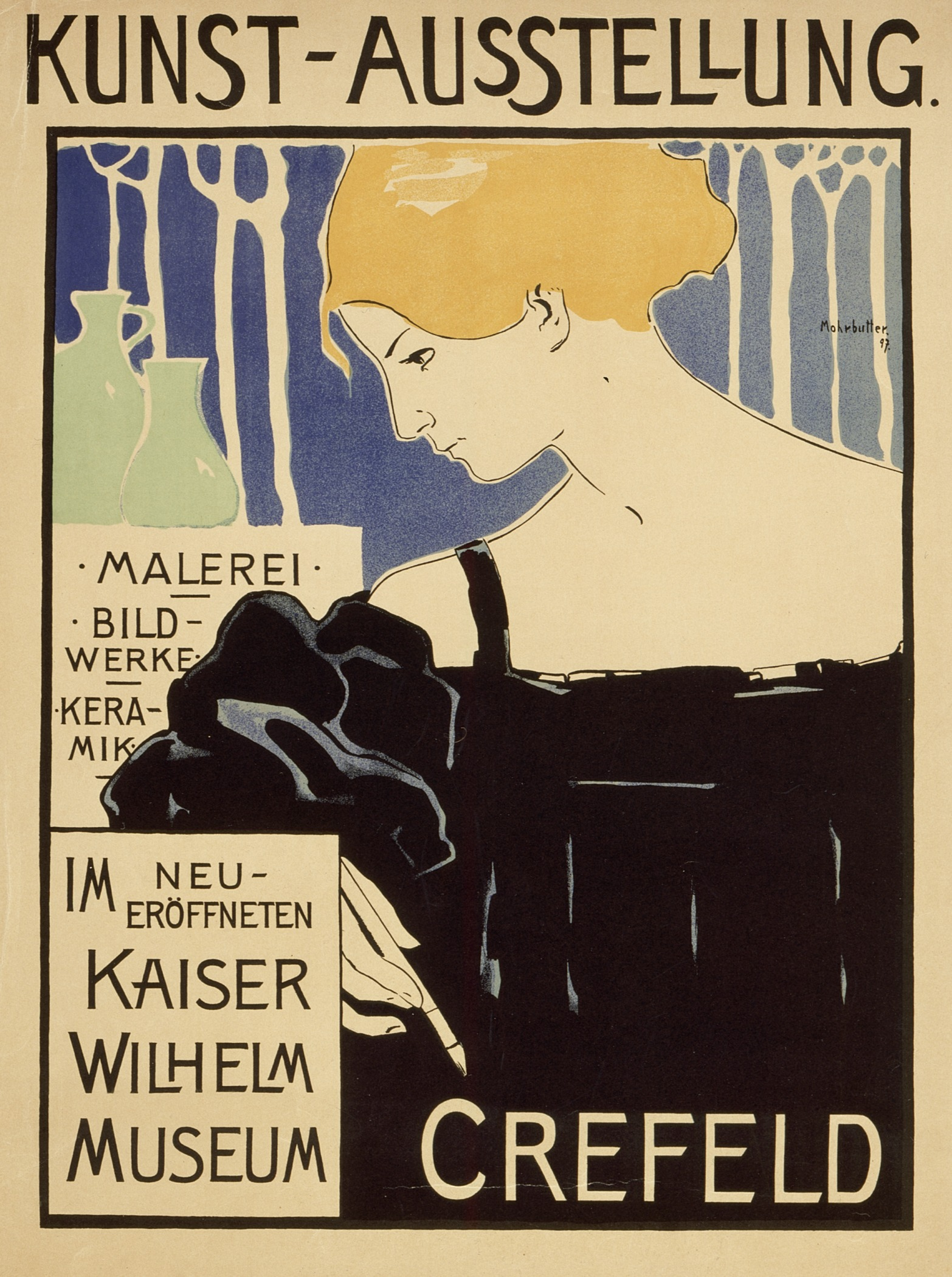
Exhibition poster by Alfred Mohrbutter

After the death of Kaiser William I in 1888, a museum was proposed to be erected as a memorial to him instead of a monument. Eventually, the Kaiser Wilhelm Museum commenced construction in 1894 and opened in 1897. Its north and south wings were extended as early as 1910–1912. The museum started with a collection from Konrad Kramer, who in the Lower Rhine region had, since 1850, been collecting furniture, sculptures, stained glass, stoneware, paintings and weapons. The Krefeld city councillor Albert Oetker bought the Kramer collection and donated it in time for the opening of the museum.

The first director of the museum was Friedrich Deneken, beginning in 1897. During his 25-year tenure, the collection grew under his leadership. In an appeal, he wrote: "The Kaiser Wilhelm Museum must preferably be directed towards the acquisition of newer art products". As early as 1900, 26 purchases laid the foundation for today's poster collection. The Italian Renaissance collection was acquired by Adolf von Beckerath in the same period.

In 1922, Max Creutz succeeded Deneken as museum director. While Deneken's focus had been on modern decorative arts and small-scale art, Creutz shifted it to contemporary fine arts. In the first year of his tenure, he acquired a collection from Deutsches Museum für Kunst in Handel und Gewerbe with works by Peter Behrens and Henry van de Velde. He also purchased paintings by Campendonk, Liebermann and Kirchner. In 1923, Creutz arranged for the creation of four large murals named Lebensalter by Johan Thorn Prikker on the upper floor.

Creutz's death in 1932 marked the beginning of a period of stagnation at the museum. Burghardt Freiherr von Lepel took over as director in 1933, but left again in 1936. Fritz Muthmann's term of office from 1937 to 1943 saw the crackdown on so-called degenerate art under the Nazi regime, and thus almost all of Creutz's collection of modern works were confiscated. Muthmann had the Prikker murals bricked up and thus saved them from destruction. The many purchases made during his tenure were reversed after the war by the victorious powers.

The museum, which was closed in 1942, survived the war unscathed and was initially shared by municipal offices and institutions.

=== Post-war years ===
In 1947, Paul Wember was appointed museum director. With the limited funds at his disposal, Wember attempted to purchase works of art from the 1930s after the currency reform in 1948 to expand and round off existing focal points of the collection. Romantic drawings and Impressionist paintings were also purchased to complete the collection. In 1953 and 1954, sheets by Max Ernst, Yves Tanguy, Joan Miró, Matisse and Picasso, among others, could be acquired at favourable prices, and thus the importance of contemporary graphic art increased within the collections. In 1955, Ulrich Lange made his childhood home, built between 1928 and 1930 by Ludwig Mies van der Rohe, available to the city of Krefeld for ten years as an exhibition venue for contemporary art. Under Wember's management, Haus Lange became one of the leading exhibition venues for avant-garde art, and it was here that Yves Klein held his first and last museum retrospective during his lifetime.

With a minimal acquisition budget, the Kunstmuseen Krefeld was not in a position to invest in classical modernism like bigger museums. Wember therefore bought unknown contemporary art, including works by Yves Klein, Tàpies and Beuys, for example a first painting by Yves Klein in 1959 for DM 500 or two paintings by Piero Manzoni for 200 DM. Wember used a wide range of contacts with gallery owners such as Michael Hertz, Alfred Schmela, Rolf Ricke, Rudolf Zwirner and Conny Fischer for exhibitions and purchases.

In 1960, the Kaiser Wilhelm Museum closed for an urgently needed general renovation, which, however, was to begin in 1966. With the expiry of the 10 years, exhibition activities in Haus Lange also ended for the time being in 1966, thus closing both museums.

=== Since 1969 ===
In April 1969, the Kaiser Wilhelm Museum was reopened. Ulrich Lange also donated Haus Lange to the city with the condition of exhibiting contemporary art there for 99 years. Wember retired in 1975. In 1976, the city of Krefeld acquired Haus Esters, the neighbouring house of Haus Lange, which opened in 1981 as another exhibition institute for temporary exhibitions of contemporary art.

In 2010, the Kaiser Wilhelm Museum closed once again for a fundamental renovation, which was carried out from 2012. With the completion of the work, the first collection presentation Das Abenteuer unserer Sammlung I was opened on 2 June 2016, thus presenting many works to the public for the first time in over six years.

== Buildings ==
=== Kaiser-Wilhelm-Museum ===
The museum building was built in 1894–1897 in the style of eclecticism and extended in 1910–1912 with north and south wings. The building remained undamaged in the Second World War and was rebuilt in 1966–1969. The removal of the grand staircase and the emperor's statue increased the exhibition space by almost 40%.

Between 2012 and 2016, the house was renovated once again and equipped according to international museum standards for climate and safety. In the process, the mural Lebensalter by Jan Thorn Prikker, created in 1923, was made visible again.

=== Haus Lange / Haus Esters ===
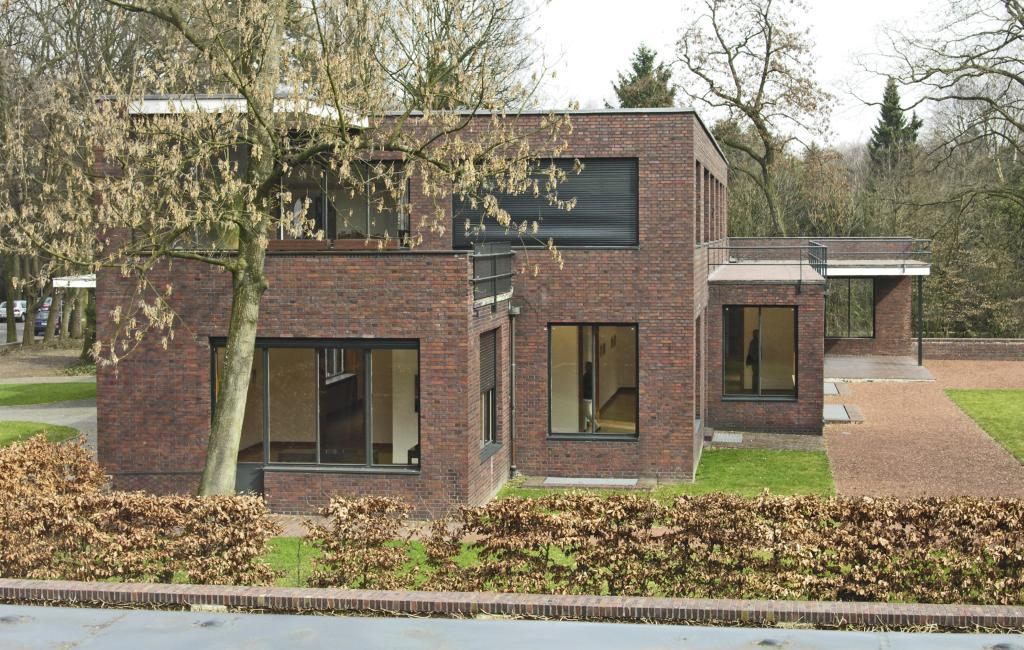
West front of Haus Esters

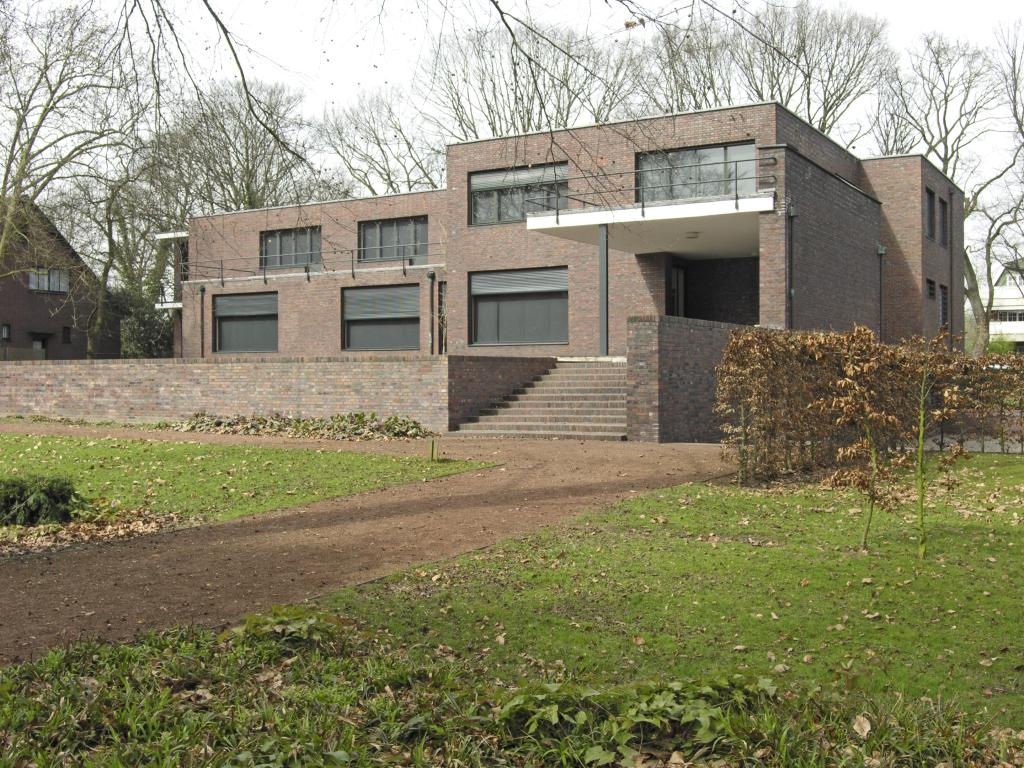
Haus Lange, garden side

In 1927, Hermann Lange, art collector and director of the Vereinigte Seidenwebereien (VerSeidAG), together with Josef Esters, also director of the VerSeidAG, commissioned the architect Ludwig Mies van der Rohe to design the homes for both families. In the same year, Mies van der Rohe had already realised the furnishing of the Café Samt und Seide at the Berlin trade fair Die Mode der Dame with his then partner Lilly Reich on behalf of the Association of German Silk Weavers with headquarters in Krefeld.

The two-storey villas, built between 1928 and 1931 in the style of classical modernism, extend into the site as flat structures consisting of nested cubes and dominant rows of windows. All the south-facing windows of the house are designed as undivided glass surfaces that can be recessed into the ground except for a low parapet height. This allows the separation between interior and exterior space to be temporarily eliminated. On the street side, however, the buildings appear relatively closed and compact. Inside, the room segments interlock.

Mies van der Rohe also designed the gardens for Haus Esters, and presumably also for Haus Lange because of the similarity. The result was landscaped areas with wide lawns, straight paths and flowerbeds whose geometry follows the formal language of the buildings. The gardens are part of the Straße der Gartenkunst zwischen Rhein und Maas.

== Collection ==
The collection of the Kunstmuseen Krefeld comprises approx. 14,000 works from the fields of painting, sculpture, graphic art, applied art, photography and new media.

=== Art before 1945 ===
The older works in the museum bear the mark of the history of the museum's origins—especially in the many donations and endowments from the early days which form the foundation of the collection. The aforementioned Oetker Collection is particularly worthy of mention, as well as the Kramer Collection with medieval sculptures from the Lower Rhine. So too, the former Beckerath Collection forms a closed complex of Italian Renaissance art with, among other things, several high-quality sculptural works of the Quattrocento.

One focus is on paintings from the 19th century, including works by Franz von Lenbach, Wilhelm Leibl, Johann Wilhelm Schirmer, Hans Thoma and various artists of the Düsseldorf School of Painting. Of particular note is Der Schadow-Kreis, a joint painting by Eduard Bendemann, Theodor Hildebrandt, Julius Hübner, Wilhelm von Schadow and Karl Ferdinand Sohn, created in Rome in 1830.

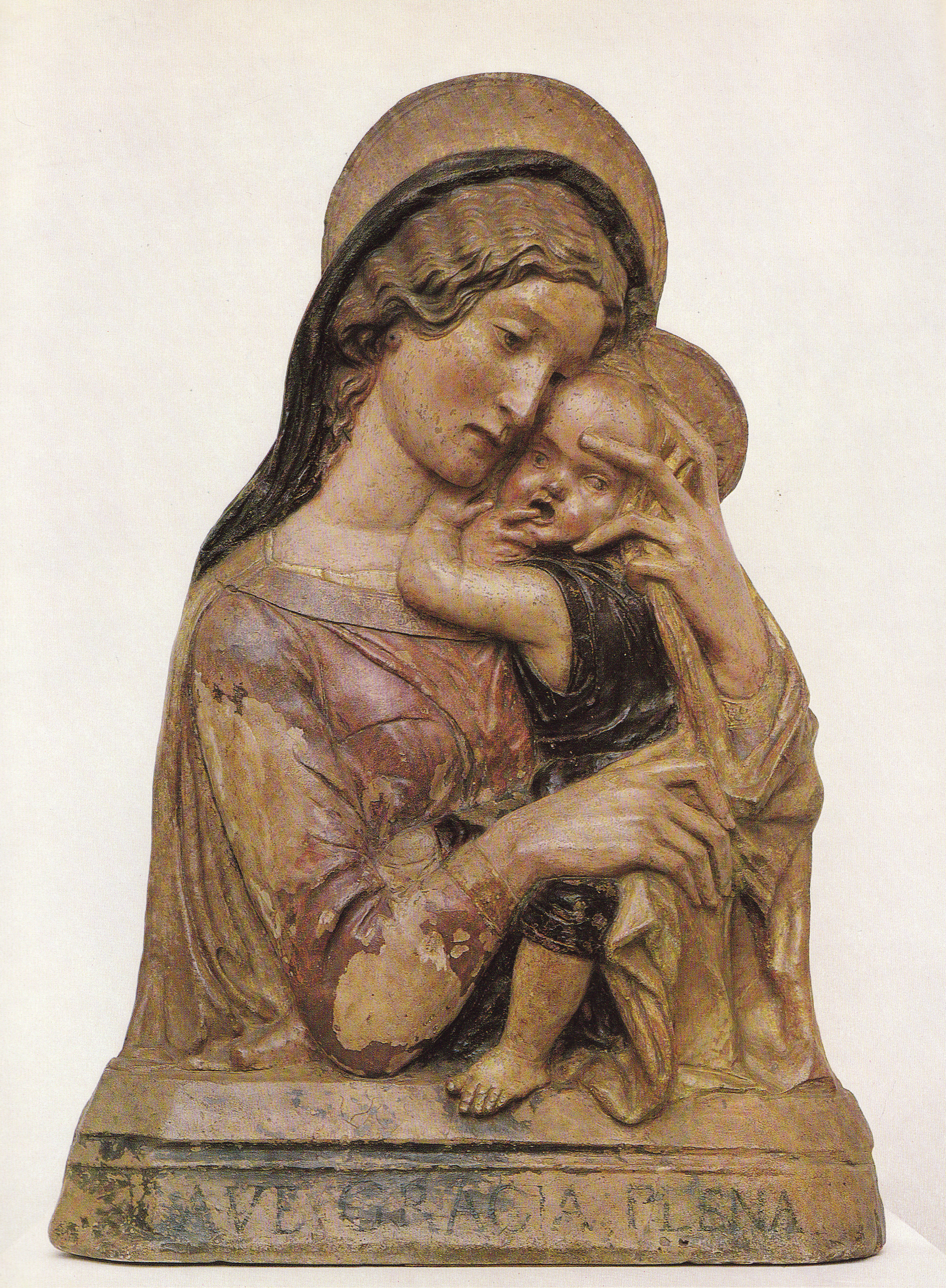
Madonna mit Kind after Donatello, ca. 1445

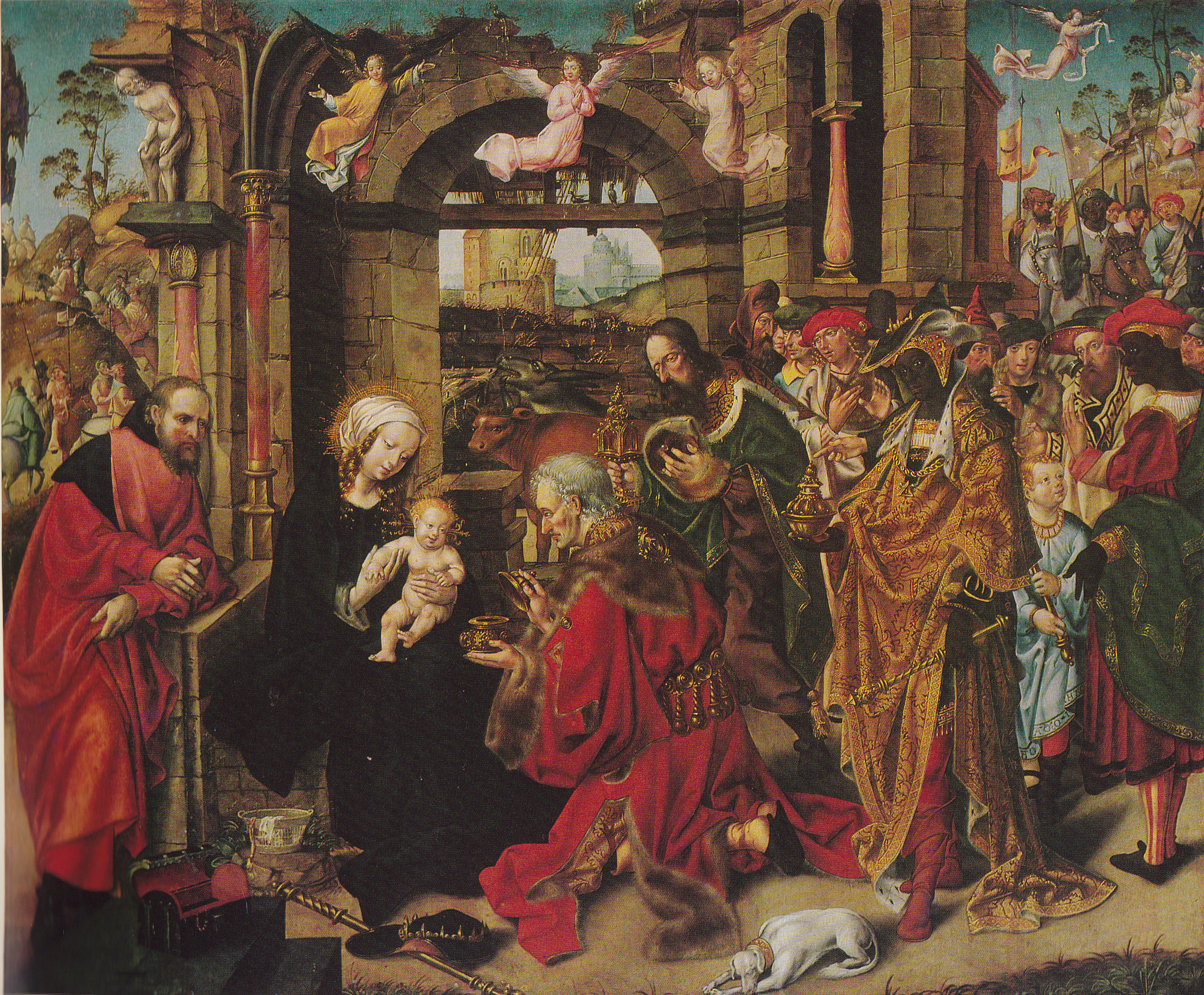
Anbetung der Heiligen Drei Könige, Aertgen van Leyden, ca. 1530

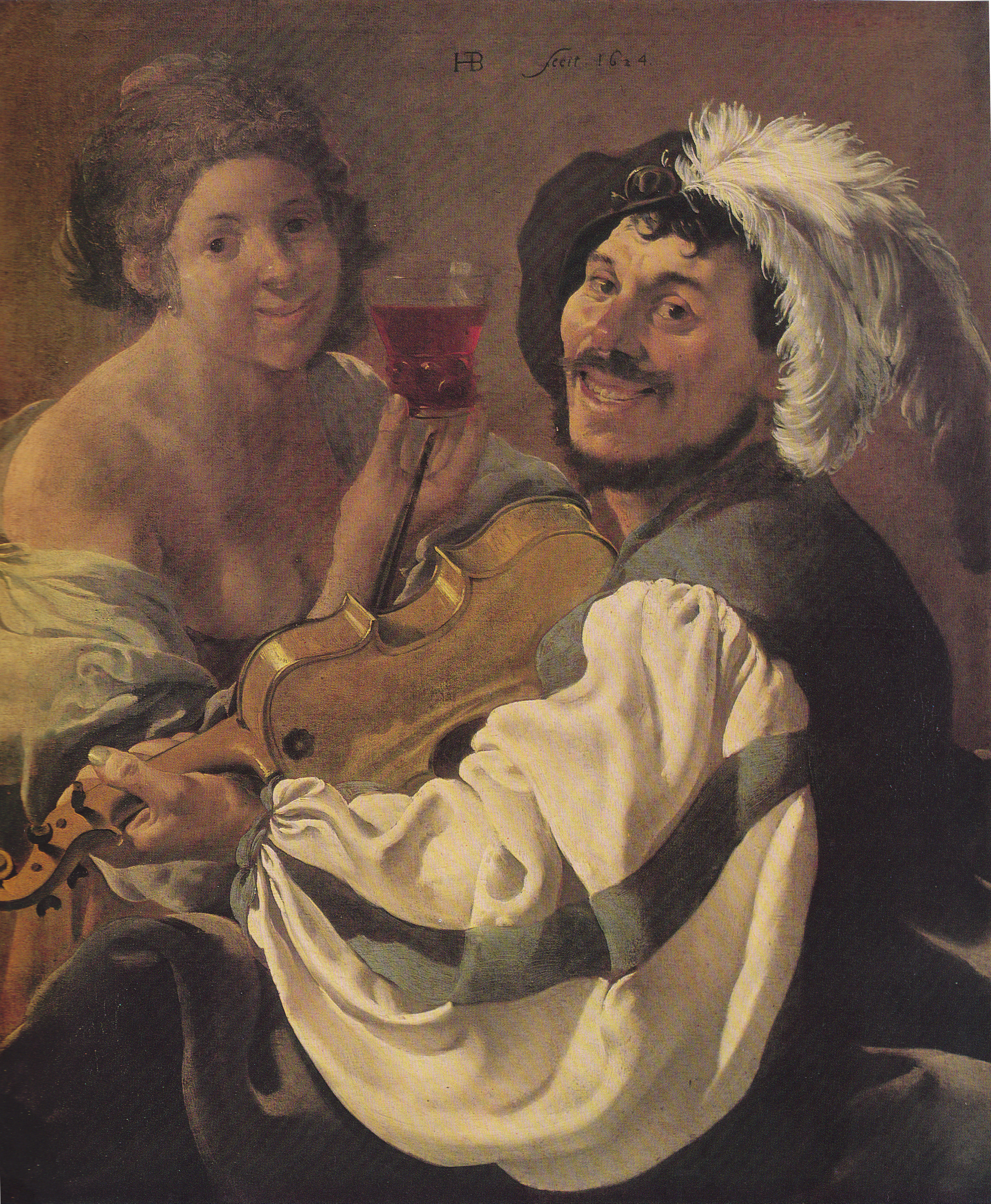
Geigenspieler und Mädchen mit Glas, Hendrick Terbrugghen, 1624

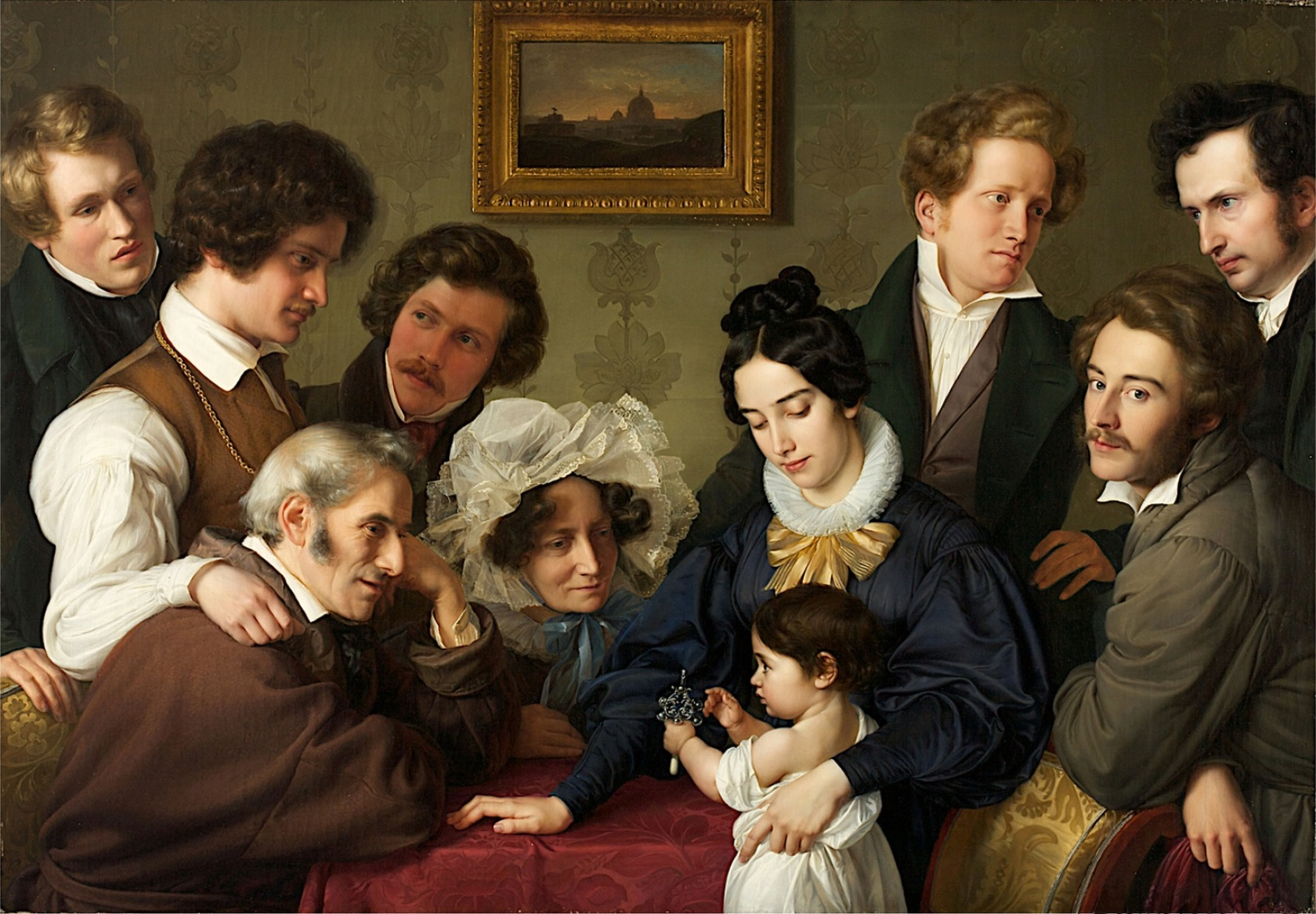
Der Schadow-Kreis Collective work by five painters, 1830

Classical Modernism is represented, among others, by the marble sculpture Eva (1900) by Auguste Rodin and the painting The Houses of Parliament in London (1904) by Claude Monet. The Modern collection was torn apart in 1937 by the confiscations in the context of degenerate art. Heinrich Campendonk's Pierrot with Sunflower (1925) and the painting Kuhmelken (1913) by Emil Nolde returned to the collection after the war. Some gaps were closed again after 1945 through targeted acquisitions. The museum has works by the German Impressionists Max Slevogt, Lois Corinth and Max Liebermann as well as Expressionist works. The Painting Flood (1912) by Wassily Kandinsky Symphony Black and Red by Alexej von Jawlensky and a group of works by Heinrich Campendonk represent the Blaue Reiter. Of particular note are the Constructivist works by Piet Mondrian, whose rightful ownership has been under discussion for some time, Theo van Doesburg and László Moholy-Nagy.

A special feature is the group of works of Rhenish Expressionism, with works by Heinrich Nauen, Helmuth Macke and Johan Thorn Prikker.

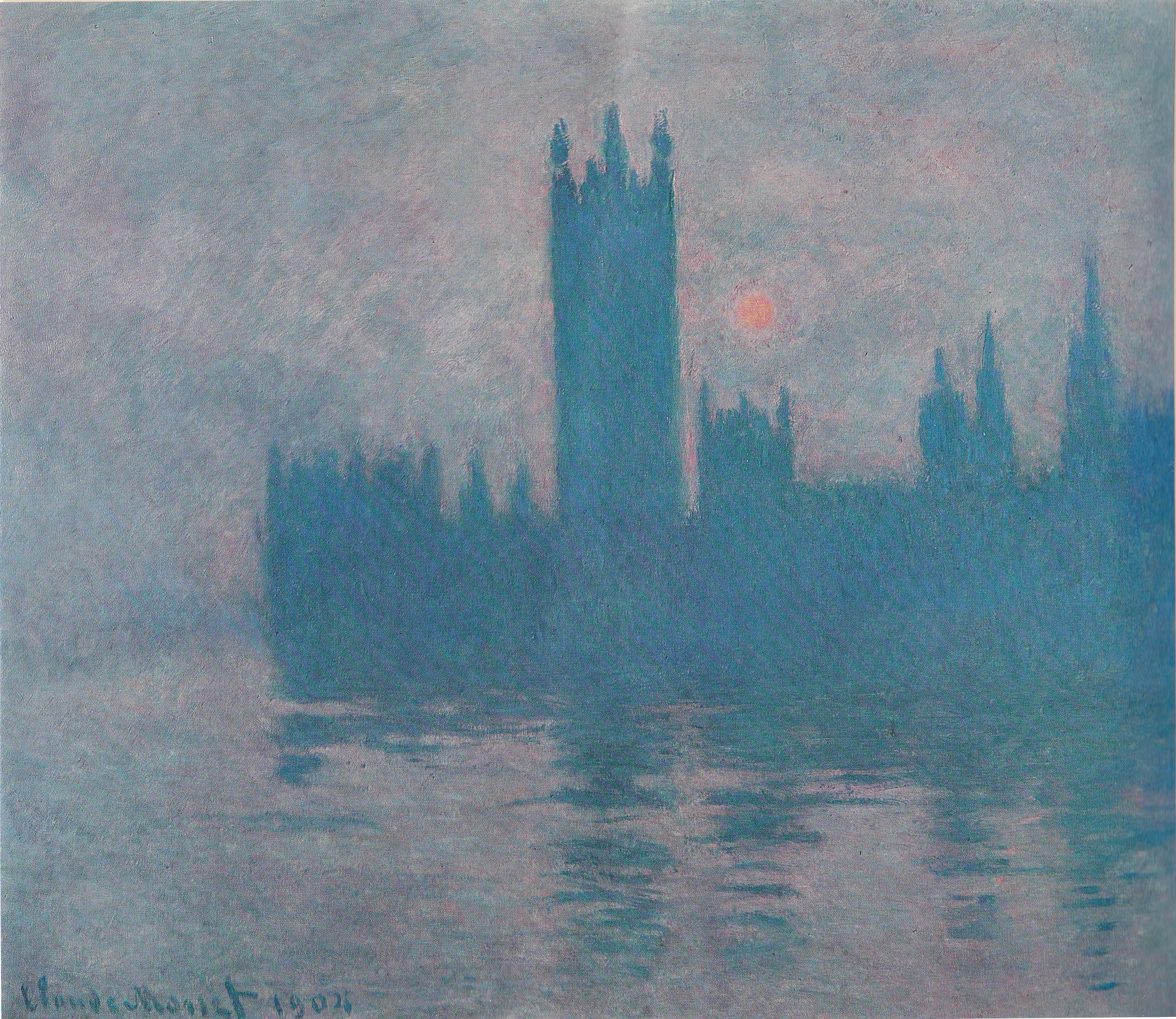
Das Parlamentsgebäude in London, Claude Monet, 1904

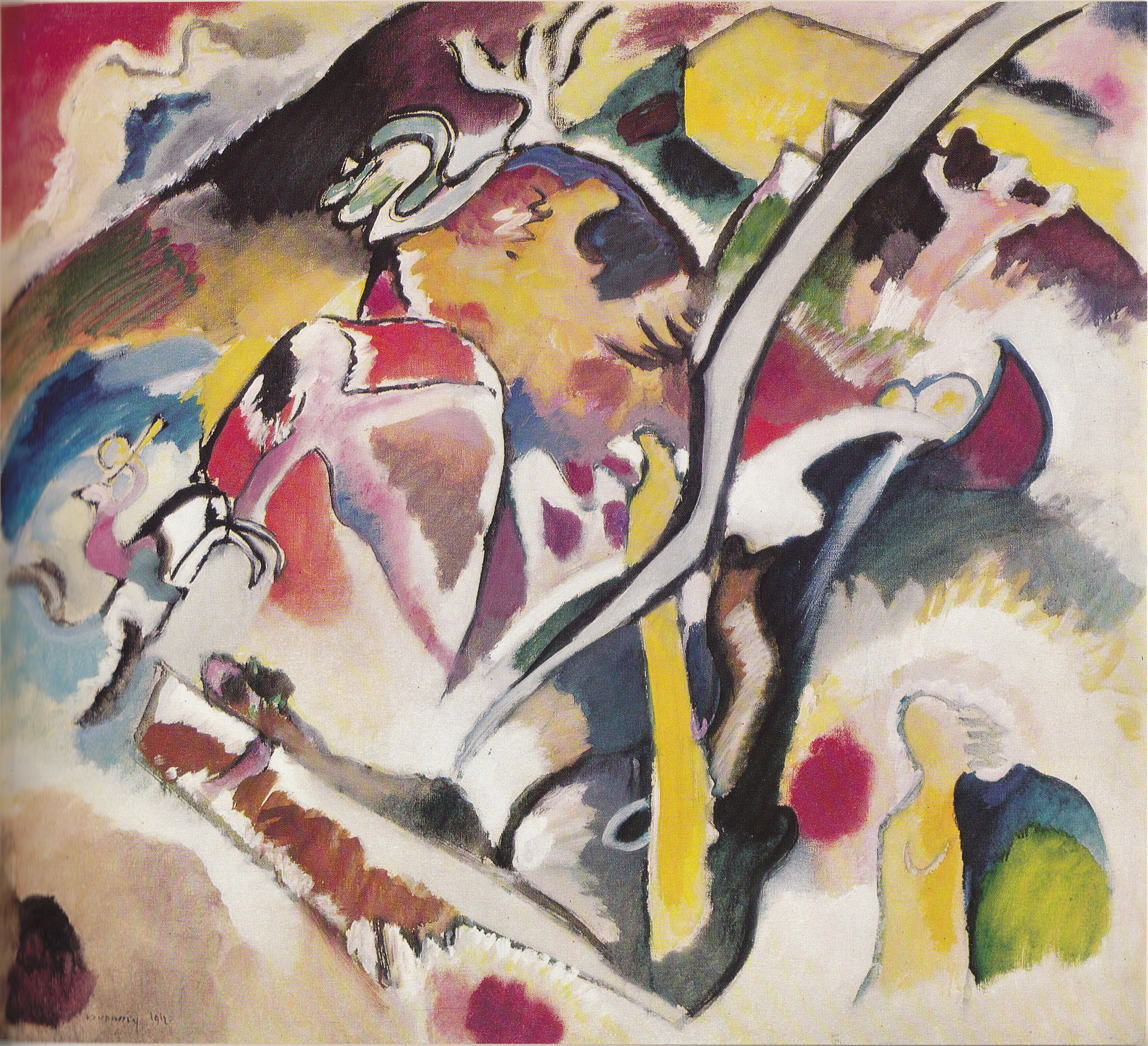
Sintflut by Wassily Kandinsky, 1912

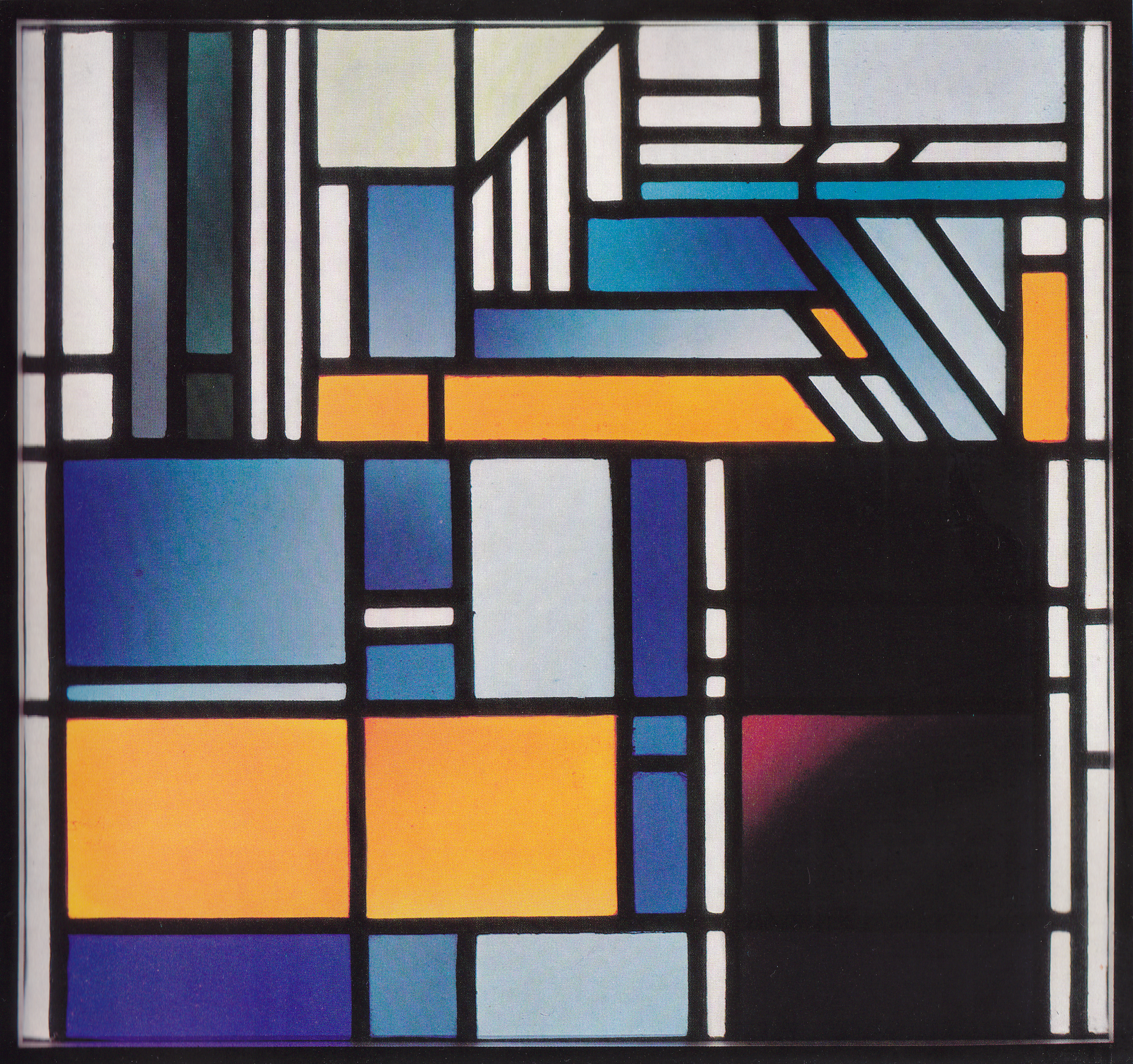
Geometrisches Ornament mit Blutrot by Johan Thorn Prikker, 1921/22

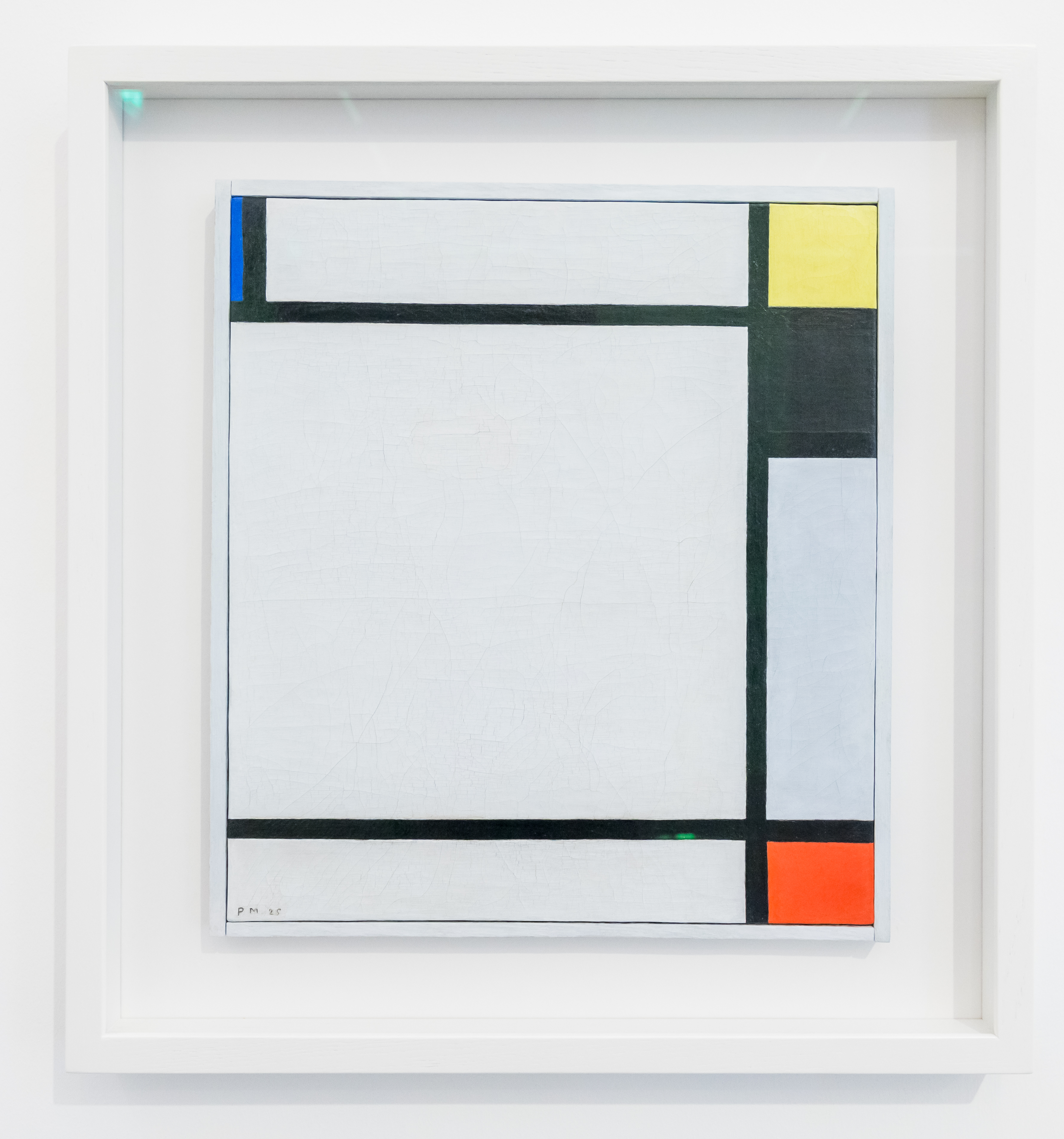
Tableau N VII by Piet Mondrian, 1925

=== Art after 1945 ===
The collection boasts many new realists. Jean Tinguely, Arman, Raymond Hains, Jacques de la Villeglé and others enrich the collection, as do Yaakov Agam, Lucio Fontana, Adolf Luther, Piero Manzoni, Jesús Rafael Soto or Heinz Mack, Otto Piene and Günther Uecker. The house has a special history with Yves Klein, who held his first and only retrospective in Haus Lange. Due to the large number of works, Klein, along with Joseph Beuys, forms a central artistic position that continues to shape the collection today. From the field of Pop Art, the museum can boast works by artists such as Robert Rauschenberg, Robert Indiana and Andy Warhol. In the 1980s, there was a turn to European positions, especially to artists of the Kunstakademie Düsseldorf, including paintings by Nicola De Maria and Norbert Prangenberg. In addition, works by Erwin Heerich, Hubert Kiecol, Abraham David Christian, Zvi Goldstein, David Rabinowitch, Richard Deacon, Didier Vermeiren, Rosemarie Trockel, Jan Vercruysse and others were collected. At the end of the 1990s, the collection was supplemented by paintings by Gerhard Richter and Sigmar Polke.

==== Joseph Beuys ====
With the Beuys Block, the Kunstmuseen Krefeld have a unique group of works consisting of seven objects that the artist arranged himself in several stages. Born in Krefeld in 1921, Beuys was very much associated with the museum. As early as 1952, he created the fountain, a commissioned work that he made – mediated by Paul Wember, the museum director at the time – for the Krefelder Edelstahlwerke. Until the last purchase in 1976, 53 further works were brought to Krefeld with the artist's help. The central object is the installation Barraque D'Dull Odde acquired in 1971, a double shelf with a lectern and seating, in which all the relics of Beuys' artistic life can be found. In February 1977, Joseph Beuys spent two days and nights dismantling the Barraque D'Dull Odde in its old location and reassembling it in a newly designed exhibition space in which the windows were covered and painted completely white. Afterwards, all the remaining Beuys works were installed in the same room together with the artist. In 1984, Beuys completed it by adding a second room. Even during the renovation of the museum between 2012 and 2016, the ensemble remained in its original place.

In 2010, this unique group of works was in danger of being torn apart when the collector Helga Lauffs withdrew her collection, which included five works by Beuys, from the museum. With the help of the state of North Rhine-Westphalia, the works of art were kept at the Kaiser Wilhelm Museum.

=== Graphic arts collection ===
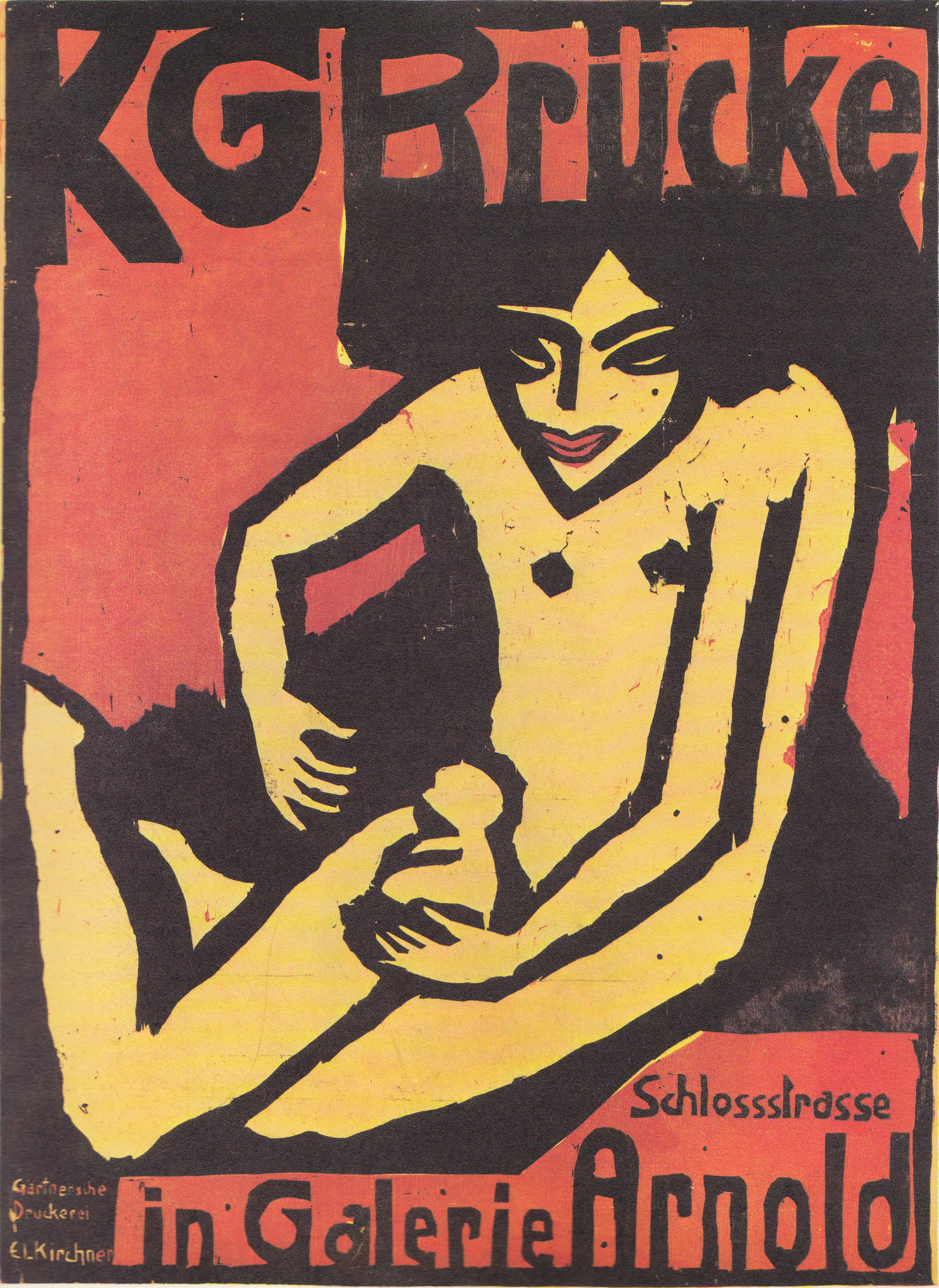
Poster for the Brücke exhibition by Ernst Ludwig Kirchner, 1905

The Kunstmuseen Krefeld have an extensive Graphic Collection with over 12,000 drawings, prints and artists' books. The foundation of this collection was laid in the early years under the director Friedrich Deneken. The aim was to provide an overview of the artistic development of the 19th century with individual sheets. But the first posters were also purchased for the international poster collection, which today numbers over 1000 sheets. In 1923, the collection expanded abruptly with the acquisition of the model collection of the Deutsches Museum für Kunst in Handel und Gewerbe. This included designs by Peter Behrens, Henry van de Velde, the Steglitzer Werkstatt and the Wiener Werkstättes. At the same time, an extensive collection of Japanese woodblock prints was created. In the 1920s, prints by Heinrich Campendonk, Erich Heckel, Käthe Kollwitz and Franz Marc joined the collection. Even after the Second World War, special attention was paid to the graphic arts collection. For example, the art museums have 80 prints by Picasso as well as works by Warhol, Beuys and Matisse. In the 1980s, works by Gerhard Richter, Nicola De Maria, Abraham David Christian, Mimmo Paladino, A. R. Penck and Norbert Prangenberg were added. In the 1990s, graphic works by artists such as Christian Boltanski, Bethan Huws, Anri Sala or Luc Tuymans entered the collection.

Following the fundamental renovation of the Kaiser Wilhelm Museum in 2016, the Graphic Arts Collection has been given a permanent place. A Graphic Studies Cabinet has been set up where visitors can ask to see sheets from the rich collection.

== Exhibitions ==
Especially since Haus Lange has been available as an exhibition space, the Krefeld art museums have presented a whole series of highly regarded art exhibitions. In the process, Haus Lange and Haus Esters are often regarded by the artists themselves as a field for experimentation, entirely in the sense of the then director Paul Wember, who formulated: The exhibition form must become a different one, because art has become different ... We can no longer be content with hanging pictures on the wall or putting sculptures on the plinth. Thus, major exhibitions by Alberto Giacometti, Alexander Calder, ZERO, Marcel Duchamp, Robert Indiana, Claes Oldenburg, among others, can be pointed to, Timm Ulrichs, Adolf Luther, Keith Sonnier, Abraham David Christian, Thomas Schütte, Gerhard Richter, Richard Deacon, Stan Douglas or Andreas Gursky. Some artists incorporated an examination of Mies van der Rohe's buildings in a special way. The beginning was made in 1961 by Yves Klein with temporary fire columns, which he lit in the garden of the house, as well as a Raum der Leere, a retrofitted room with a floor area of seven square metres, which he whitewashed in a grainy white and which exists unchanged to this day. In 1971, Haus Lange was covered with an airborne construction by the group Haus-Rucker-Co for the exhibition Cover, Überleben in verschmutzter Umwelt. Christo laid out his fabric panels in the house and garden for the presentation Wrapped Floors and Wrapped Walk Ways in the same year. In 2009, for the exhibition BRICK BLDG, LG WINDOWS W/XLENT VIEWS, PARTIALLY FURNISHED, RENOWNED ARCHITECT, John Baldessari fully covered the large windows of Haus Lange outside with images of bricks.

- 2017/2018: Haus Lange Exat 51 – Synthese der Künste im Jugoslawien der Nachkriegszeit.
- 2017/2018: Haus Esters Jamina Cibic: Spirit of our Needs (curated by Katia Baudin).
- 2020: Haus Esters Sharon Ya'ari. The Romantic Trail and the Concrete House.

== See also ==
- List of design museums
