= Max Creutz =

German art historian (1876–1932)

- Born: 8 December 1876; Aachen, German Empire
- Died: 13 March 1932 (aged 55); Krefeld, Germany
- Education: Humboldt University of Berlin
- Organizations: Museum für Angewandte Kunst Köln; Kaiser-Wilhelm-Museum

Max Creutz (8 December 1876 – 13 March 1932) was a German art historian and curator of the Museum für Angewandte Kunst Köln and the Kaiser-Wilhelm-Museum in Krefeld where he worked from 1922 until his death. In Cologne, in 1914 he was instrumental in the first exhibition of the Deutscher Werkbund, Deutsche Werkbundausstellung. In Krefeld, he succeeded in acquiring modern art exhibits, including works by Max Ernst, Wassily Kandinsky, and Alexej von Jawlensky. He included a substantial collection of art, crafts and design from the Bauhaus.

== Life and work ==
Creutz was born in Aachen and attended the Progymnasium in Jülich, and then the Gymnasium in Düren, where he graduated in 1897. His father, also Max Creutz was Königlicher Kreis-Rentmeister. Creutz studied art history in Vienna, and attended a school for painting. In Munich and then at the Humboldt University of Berlin he studied art history and philosophy, and trained himself in painting. Meanwhile, he traveled extensively, through Germany, Italy, Belgium, and the Netherlands. He attained his PhD on 16 March 1901, with a thesis titled "Masaccio, mit dem Versuch zur stilistischen und chronologischen Einordnung seiner Werke" (Masaccio, trying to sort his works in style and time). This was followed by a period as a research assistant at the Kunstgewerbemuseum Berlin, where he worked on the new edition of the Kunsthandbuch (1904). He also published in the journal Berliner Architekturwelt.

=== Cologne ===
From 1908, Creutz was director of the Museum für Angewandte Kunst Köln. At the end of 1911, the association of craftsmen Deutscher Werkbund, founded in 1907, hoped to have a representative exhibition of their own. Carl Rehorst, the chairman of the Cologne Werkbund, wanted it in his city at all costs and immediately initiated the founding of an association, with himself as executive chairman, together with the mayor Max Wallraf and the chairman of Deutscher Werkbund, Peter Bruckmann. Initially, only Karl Ernst Osthaus and Creutz were included as "local confidants" in the regional association.

In 1912, Creutz was on the organizing committee of the Internationale Kunstausstellung des Sonderbundes Westdeutscher Kunstfreunde und Künstler in Cologne, bringing together more than 600 artworks from artists like Van Gogh, Munch, Picasso, Cézanne, Kirchner and others.

Creutz became vice secretary for the 1914 Deutsche Werkbundausstellung. He noted in 1913 on Rehorst's urban planning: "Rehorst is attempting a balance between the preservation of the old cityscape and the construction of the new one. [...] It is particularly to Karl Rehorst's credit that, in the face of great difficulties, he has treated precisely the stepchildren of architecture: utilitarian buildings and industrial works, with as much love as the city's representative buildings." Rehorst repeatedly adapted the overall plan of the exhibition and organised it with a huge staff of municipal officials. The Deutsche Werkbundausstellung was opened on 16 May 1914.

In 1919, the exhibition of the Wilhelm Clemens collection opened at the Kunstgewerbemuseum Köln. Creutz, a Rhinelander as Clemens, was one of few people with knowledge of the collecting activities of the painter.

=== Krefeld ===
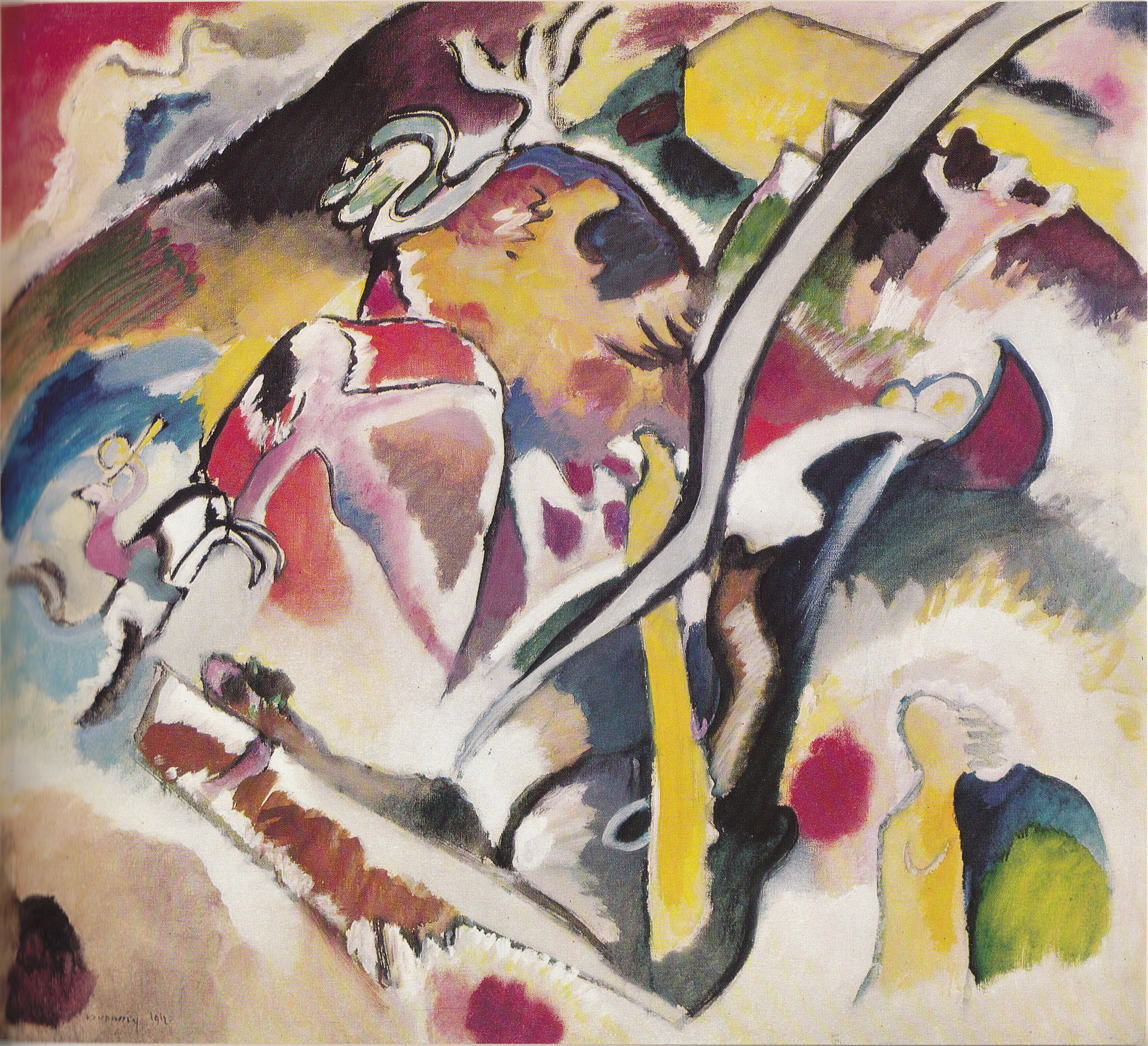
Sintflut by Wassily Kandinsky (1912)

In 1922, Creutz moved from Cologne to Krefeld to succeed Friedrich Deneken, who had been director of the Kaiser-Wilhelm-Museum there for a quarter of a century. While Deneken's focus had been on modern decorative arts and small art (Kleinkunst) of Jugendstil and Impressionism, Creutz shifted the exhibition and acquisition policy to modern art, the contemporary art of the time. Soon, the museum's collection included not only works by the so-called German Impressionists, but also by the Brücke painters, Der Blaue Reiter artists, and works by Rhenish Expressionism. In addition to important individual works such as Marine verte (1925) by Max Ernst, Sintflut (1912) by Wassily Kandinsky, the Symphonie Schwarz-Rot (1929) by Alexej von Jawlensky, works by Karl Schmidt-Rottluff, Ernst Ludwig Kirchner, Erich Heckel, Heinrich Nauen and Heinrich Campendonk were added. Campendonk's Pierrot mit Schlange was acquired in 1923.

In 1923 Creutz succeeded in bringing a travelling model exhibition of Deutscher Werkbund to Krefeld, presenting over 2000 objects and graphic works from the Deutsches Museum für Kunst in Handel und Gewerbe. It consisted of works by the most important modern artists, architects and designers from the period 1900 to 1914, making Krefeld one of the few collections representing the Bauhaus movement. From 1911, he worked closely with the Hagen-based art collector and patron Karl Ernst Osthaus. In 1923, Creutz commissioned Johan Thorn-Prikker to paint monumental murals for his museum, depicting four phases of life from childhood to maturity. In 1928, in collaboration with Kandisky, he held an exhibition titled Farbe (Colour). Kandinsky, who contributed exhibitis, had given Bauhaus courses on the use of colour in crafts and industry, had attended a 1902 exhibition Farbenschau organised by Deneken in Krefeld and had been inspired to contribute to the Der Blaue Reiter almanch.

Two new villas were designed by Mies van der Rohe for industrialists Hermann Lange (1874–1942) and Josef Esters, and built in Krefeld side by side as Haus Lange and Haus Esters. Lange was a co-founder of the Neue Kunst association for modern art in Krefeld and supported Creutz in numerous undertakings that served to promote modern art. The villa house museum collections today.

=== Private life and legacy ===
Creutz was married to Käthe, née Schütze, a sister of the painter, graphic artist and women's rights activist Ilse Schütze (1868–1923), who was married to Ernst Schur.

Creutz died in 1932 at the age of 55. He did not have to witness how an essential part of his life's work was destroyed in 1937 by the Nazis' expropriation and sale of the Expressionist collection of the Kaiser Wilhelm Museum. Three 1925 painting by Mondrian escaped because Creutz had failed to list them in the inventory. The paintings Pierrot mit Schlange by Campendonk and Emil Nolde's Milking Cows (1913) returned to Krefeld after World War II. Pierrot mit Schlange was restored and exhibited again in 2016.

In 2019, on the occasion of the centenary of the Bauhaus, the Kunstmuseum Krefeld held an exhibition of the Bauhaus arts, crafts and design that Creutz had brought to Krefeld.

== Publications ==
- Julius Lessing, Max Creutz (eds:): Wandteppiche und Decken des Mittelalters in Deutschland. Wasmuth, Berlin 1901
- Kunsthandbuch für Deutschland, Erstausgabe 1904
- Das Charlottenburger Rathaus. in: Berliner Architekturwelt. year 8, 1906
- Otto Andreae, Max Creutz: Cölnischer Kunstgewerbe-Verein. XVIII. Jahres-Bericht des Kunstgewerbe-Museums der Stadt Cöln für 1908. DuMont, Cologne, 1909
- Hermann Lüer, Max Creutz: Geschichte der Metallkunst. Vol. 2: Max Creutz: Kunstgeschichte der edlen Metalle. Enke, Stuttgart 1909
- Joseph Maria Olbrich, Max Creutz: Das Warenhaus Tietz in Düsseldorf. Wasmuth, Berlin 1909
- Max Creutz: Banken und andere Verwaltungsgebäude. Wasmuth, Berlin, 1911
- Das Warenhaus Tiez in Elberfeld, von Prof. Wilhelm Kreis, X. Sonderheft der Architektur des XX. Jahrhunderts. Ernst Wasmuth, Berlin 1912
