= Alfred Mohrbutter =

German painter

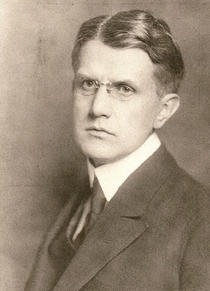
Alfred Mohrbutter (date unknown)

Alfred Mohrbutter (10 December 1867 – 21 May 1916) was a German painter, graphic designer, and etcher.

== Life and work ==
He was born in Celle. His father, Friedrich-Wilhelm Mohrbutter, was an orchestra conductor. He attended the Christianeum then, from 1885 to 1887, the local trade school, where he learned to draw, using plaster models. From 1887 to 1890, he studied at the Grand-Ducal Saxon Art School, Weimar, with Leopold von Kalckreuth. In 1891, he returned to his parents' home in Hamburg, where he painted portraits of his friends and residents of the nearby poorhouse. He also painted realistic scenes of the 1892 cholera epidemic.

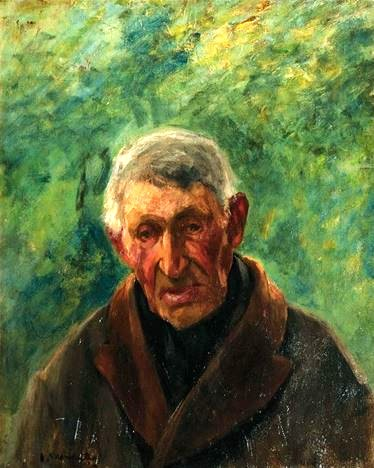
Portrait of an Old Man

In 1893, he accompanied a friend to Paris, to study at the Académie Julian. There, under the influence of Gabriel Ferrier, he came to prefer pastels. Parisian life, in turn, influenced his choice of subject matter; fashion, fabrics and interesting color combinations. Back in Hamburg, he became part of the circle of artists associated with Justus Brinckmann, head of the Museum für Kunst und Gewerbe. He joined several associations, including the Hamburger Künstlerverein von 1832. At Brinckmann's suggestion, he studied etching with the Danish artist, Peter Alfred Schou, who was living in Hamburg at that time, and was encouraged to create designs for the "Scherrebeker Webschule", a tapestry maker associated with the Gobelins Manufactory, a dozen of which were used. In addition, he designed posters for the Kunstmuseen Krefeld.

He moved to Berlin in 1900, to become a teacher at the Kunstgewerbeschule in Charlottenburg. He was also a strong supporter of the Victorian dress reform movement; designing clothing and fabrics. In 1904, he published Das Kleid der Frau. Ein Beitrag zur künstlerischen Gestaltung des Frauen-Kleides (The Woman's Dress), which was reprinted, with commentary, in 1985. Later, he widened his interests, to designing porcelain and glass. He was a member of the Verein Berliner Künstler and the Deutschen Künstlerbund.

After 1906, his health began to decline, and he spent much of his time on the coast, at Wyk auf Föhr, in an effort to recuperate. By 1908, he was forced to seek professional assistance, staying at the sanatorium operated by Erhard Hartung von Hartungen in Riva del Garda; frequented by notable people from all over Europe. During this period, he was one of the signatories supporting the formation of the Werdandi-Bund, an organization involved in the Völkisch movement.

Despite his failing health, he continued to teach and exhibit; including a major showing at the Große Berliner Kunstausstellung in 1915. He died the following year, aged only forty-eight, at a sanatorium in the Babelsberg district of Potsdam.

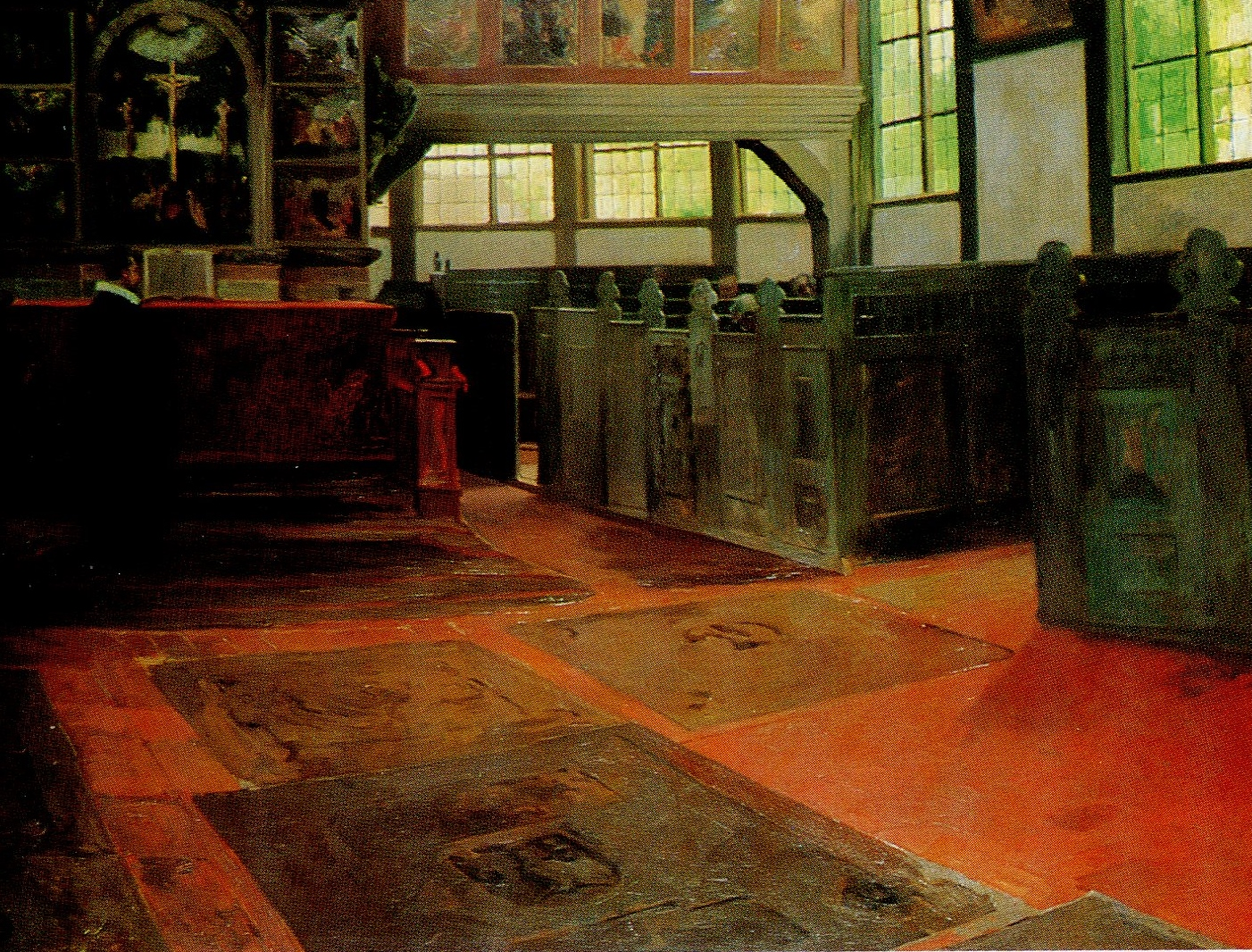
Interior of the Church in Allermöhe
