= Agathe Wegerif-Gravestein =

Dutch artist and painter (1867-1944)

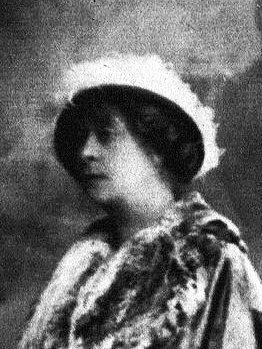
- Born: Agathe Johanna Gravestein; February 24, 1867; Vlissingen, the Netherlands
- Died: December 16, 1944 (aged 77); Laren, North Holland
- Movement: Arts and Crafts, Art Nouveau, Nieuwe Kunst

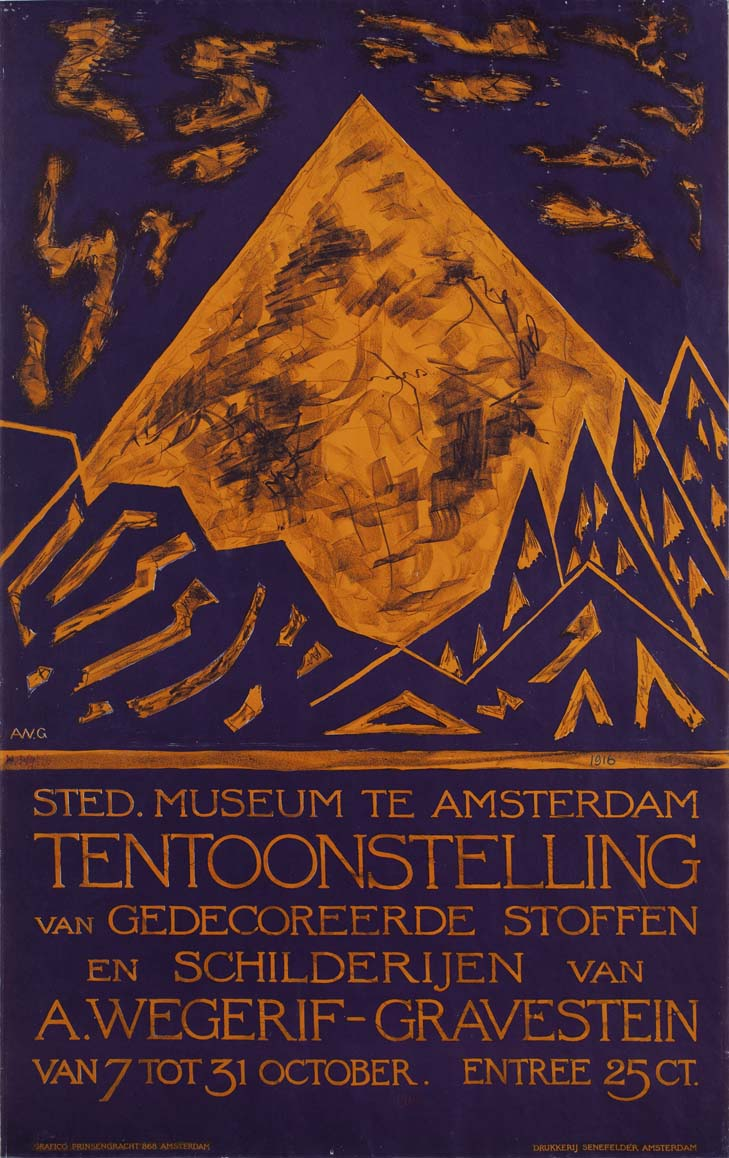
Poster Stedelijk Museum Amsterdam, tentoonstelling A. Wegerif-Gravestein

Agathe Wegerif-Gravestein (24 February 1867–16 December 1944) was a Dutch artist best known for her work in the decorative arts.

Wegerif-Gravestein was born on February 24, 1867 in Vlissingen, Holland.

In 1890 she married fellow artist Christiaan Wegerif, with whom she had three children. The couple settled in Apeldoorn. There, Wegerif-Gravestein established a batik studio. The studio was successful, producing mostly fabrics for interior decoration. The studio produced designs by Johan Thorn Prikker and Chris Lebeau.

Wegerif-Gravestein displayed the studio's work in a variety of international settings including the Exposition Universelle (1900), and the 1915 Panama–Pacific International Exposition.

Wegerif-Gravestein died on December 16, 1944 in Laren, Holland.

Her work is in the CODA Museum, the Stedelijk Museum Amsterdam, and the Kunstmuseum Den Haag,
