= Haus Lange and Haus Esters =

Buildings by Ludwig Mies van der Rohe

Lange and Esters Houses
- Haus Lange Haus Esters
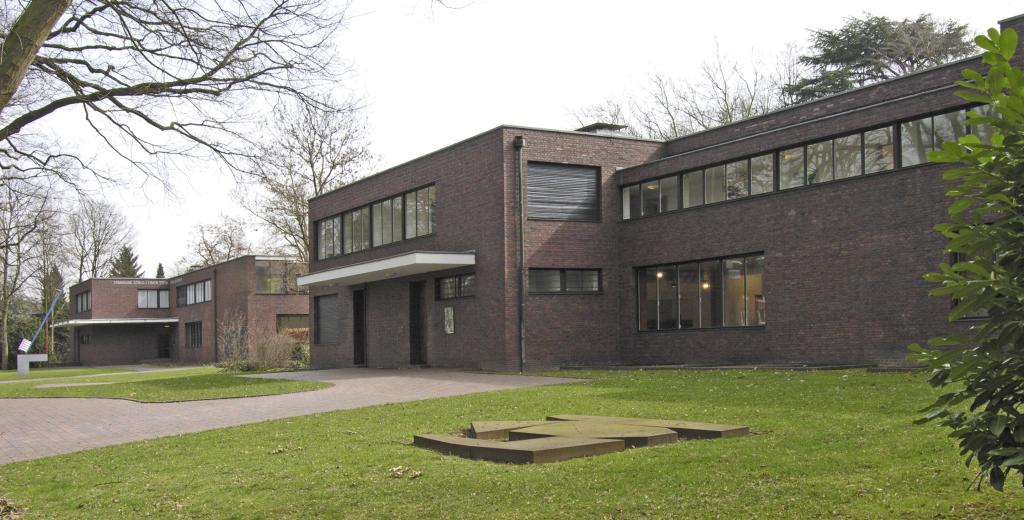
- House Lange and House Ester viewed from the street
- Interactive map of the Lange and Esters Houses area

General information
- Type: Villa
- Architectural style: Modernist
- Location: Krefeld, Germany
- Coordinates: 51°20′49.26″N 6°34′57.29″E
- Current tenants: Kunstmuseen Krefeld
- Construction started: 1928
- Completed: 1930

Design and construction
- Architect: Ludwig Mies van der Rohe

Haus Lange and Haus Esters are two residential houses designed by Ludwig Mies van der Rohe in Krefeld, Germany, for German industrialists Hermann Lange and Josef Esters. They were built between 1928 and 1930 in the Bauhaus style. The houses have now been converted into museums for Contemporary art.

== History ==
Hermann Lange and Josef Esters established in 1920 the "Vereinigte Seidenwebereien AG" (United Silk Weaving Mills Company), or Verseidag. Verseidag commissioned at the end of 1930 to Ludwig Mies van der Rohe the realisation of an office and warehouse building in the Verseidag factory buildings in Krefeld. The so-called Verseidag Färberei and HE building were completed in 1931.

In 1927, Esters and Lange commissioned the design of two adjoining houses from Mies. The two houses were built between 1928 and 1930 after the ideas from Bauhaus and other Modernists. They are not identical, but very similar in their geometric appearance and the use of brick as a building material. Closed on the street side, both have high windows that open onto a landscaped garden. The gardens alternate grassed areas, paths and flowerbeds according to geometric principles that evoke the continuity of interior and exterior spaces.

In 1955, the heir of Hermann Lange decided to present his father's collections in the Lange House and organized contemporary art exhibitions before donating them to the city of Krefeld in 1968. Ten years later, in 1978, the Haus Esters was in turn sold to the city of Krefeld. Transformed into museums of contemporary art, the two houses have since then formed, together with the Kaiser Wilhelm Museum, the Kunstmuseen Krefeld (Krefeld Art Museums). They are open to the public only during exhibitions.

== See also ==
- Villa Wolf (Gubin)
- Villa Tugendhat in Brno

== Bibliography ==
- Kleinman, Kent; Van Duzer, Leslie (2005). Krefeld Villas. Princeton Architectural Press. ISBN 978-1-56898-503-9.
- Cohen, Jean-Louis (1996). Mies Van Der Rohe. Taylor & Francis. ISBN 978-0-419-20330-8.
- Lange, Christiane (2011). Ludwig Mies van der Rohe : Architektur für die Seidenindustirie (in German). Berlin: Nicolai. ISBN 978-3-89479-668-6.
- Engels, Hans; Meyer, Ulf (2006). Bauhaus: 1919–1933. Prestel Pub. ISBN 978-3-7913-3613-8.
