= Erhard Hartung von Hartungen =

Austrian physician

Erhard Christoph Clemens Hartung von Hartungen (born 7 July 1880, Vienna - died 15 July 1962, Innsbruck) was an Austrian doctor and homeopath known for his work in sanatoria, including the sanatorium in Riva on Lake Garda established by his father.

== Biography ==
Erhard Hartung von Hartungen was born on 7 July 1880 in Vienna. He was the eldest son of Christoph Hartung von Hartungen and his wife Clara. Hartungen received a private education at his parents house in Vienna before his family moved to Riva, on Lake Garda, where he studied at schools in Brixen and Trento. He graduated in 1899 and then studied at the University of Vienna and then in Florence. He qualified as a doctor in 1905 and was one of a line of 16 physicians. Hartungen married Eva von Arnim-Kröchlendorff, the great-niece of Otto von Bismarck. They had four children.

After training in sanatoria in Engelberg in Switzerland and Arco in Italy, Hartungen ran the spas of Tobelbad in Graz and Agathenhof in Carinthia. He worked with Wilhelm Winternitz and Alois Strasser. Hartungen then took over the management of the sanatorium founded by his father in Riva. This was a nature and water cure spa, visited by aristocrats, writers, diplomats, scientists and artists. During the summers, the sanatorium relocated patients and staff to a facility in the Ulten Valley to escape the heat.

During the war, from 1915 to 1918, von Hartungen worked as a senior medical officer of the Sovereign Military Order of Malta. In the 1920s, he built a cold water spa at Lochau on Bodensee lake. He then ran a spa in the town of Hall in Tirol, worked at a Grape therapy resort in Merano, and worked as a doctor in Innsbruck, where he died on 15 July 1962.

Magnus Hirschfeld visited the sanatorium as a guest and evening lecturer at the invitation of Hartungen. After World War I left them impoverished, Heinrich Mann and Thomas Mann wrote to one another of the happy and unforgettable times they had passed in Riva. Other notable patients treated by Hartungen included Albin Egger-Lienz, Kazimiera Iłłakowiczówna, Thomas Mann, Heinrich Mann, Franz Kafka, Christian Morgenstern, Eugen d’Albert, Hermann Sudermann, Henry Thode, Kurt Schuschnigg, Louis Kolitz, Max Brod, Prince Philipp of Saxe-Coburg and Gotha, Ernst Gunther, Duke of Schleswig-Holstein, Princess Dorothea of Saxe-Coburg and Gotha, and Prince Louis of Liechtenstein.

== Publications ==
- L'"Ora", fattore igienico. 1907-11-02.
- Reform-Sanatorium Dr. von Hartungen. Riva am Gardasee. A. Edlinger. November 1907.
- Der Fremdenverkehr und seine Förderung am Nordgestade des Gardasees. 1910-12-17.
- Sanatorium und Wasserheilanstalt Dr. von Hartungen, Riva – Gardasee. 1911.
- Dr. von Hartungen. Sanatorium und Wasserheilanstalt für Erwachsene und Kinder. Riva am Gardasee. Deutsche Buchdruckerei. January 1913.
