= Friedrich Deneken =

German art historian (1857–1927)

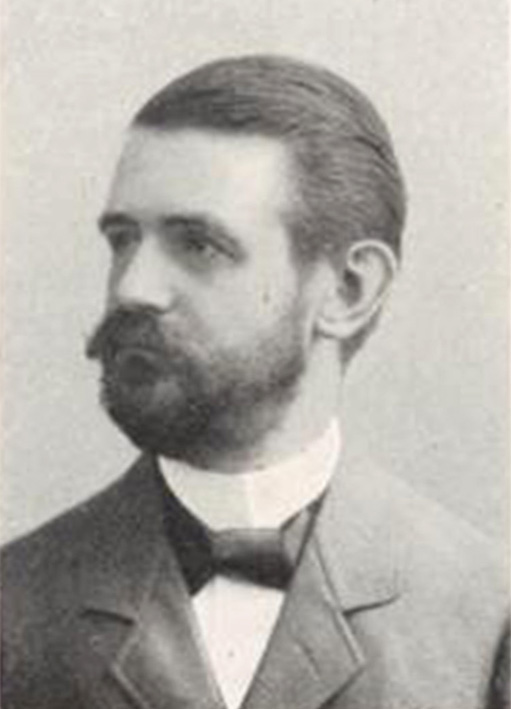
Friedrich Deneken (1904)

Friedrich Deneken (15 March 1857, Hadersleben - 1927, Hamburg) was a German art historian and museum director.

== Biography ==
From 1876, he studied archaeology and classical philology at Humboldt University of Berlin, then at the University of Bonn. In 1881, he returned to Berlin to study with Ernst Curtius and presented his thesis on the theme of Theoxenia (offering hospitality to a God in disguise), which earned him his PhD. After that, he turned to art history and worked at the Museum für Kunst und Gewerbe Hamburg. From 1897 to 1922, he served as the first Director of the Kaiser-Wilhelm-Museums in Krefeld.

There, he built up a collection of contemporary art; primarily Impressionism and Art Nouveau. He was also involved in an effort to establish a collaboration between local industries and artists or craftsmen; such as Peter Behrens, Henry van de Velde, Otto Eckmann and Joseph Maria Olbrich. Later, he became one of the founders of the Deutscher Werkbund and campaigned for the establishment of a Kunstgewerbeschule in Krefeld. In 1904, Johan Thorn Prikker was appointed as one of the first teachers there.

He served as a delegate to numerous major art exhibitions. Notable works include Linie und Form (1904), Die Sammlung niederrheinischer Tonarbeiten (1914) and Die Sammlung japanischer Farbenholzschnitte (1922)

== Sources ==
- Christiane Lange: "Die Krefelder Teppichfabrik AG, vormals Joh. Kneusels & Co. und die Reformbestrebungen des Krefelder Museumsdirektors Friedrich Deneken (1897–1914)". In: Dieter Breuer (Ed.): Die Moderne im Rheinland. Rheinland-Verlag, Cologne 1994, pgs. 343–349. ISBN 978-3-7927-1391-4
- Rainer Stamm: "Aufbruch in die Moderne. Das Kaiser Wilhelm Museum unter seinem ersten Direktor Friedrich Deneken (1897–1922)". In: Farbwelten. Von Monet bis Yves Klein. Werke der klassischen Moderne aus den Kunstmuseen Krefeld, Bremen 2009, pgs. 9–19. ISBN 978-3-981029-64-2
