= Abraham David Christian =

German sculptor

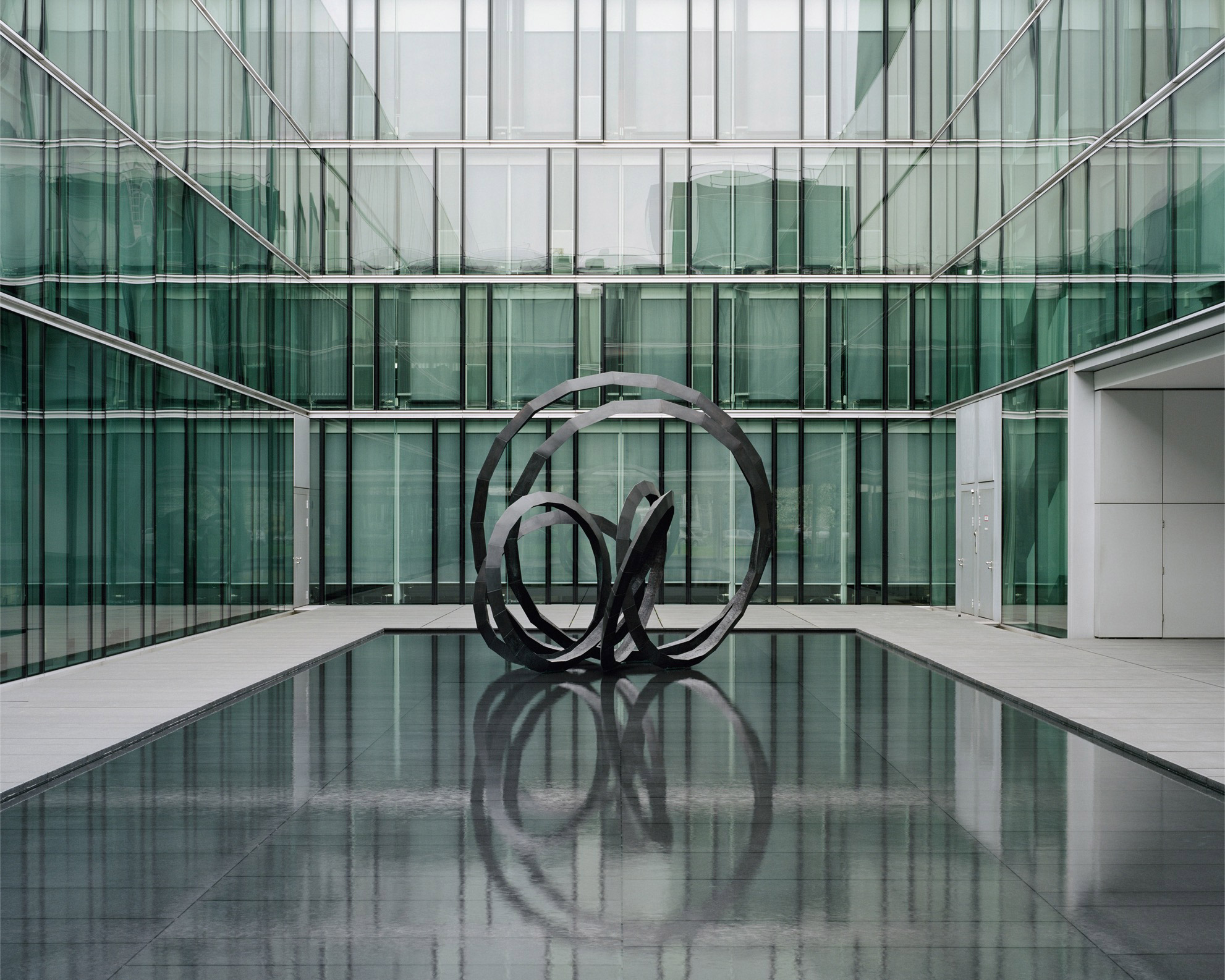
- Abraham David Christian, Interconnected Sculpture, 2007, Bronze, 389 x 410 x 340 cm, Private Collection
- Born: 1952 (age 73–74)
- Known for: Sculpture

Abraham David Christian (born 1952) is a German sculptor.

== Life and work ==
Christian's sculptures were included in Documenta 5, when he was only nineteen years old, and he had his first one-person show at the Kunsthalle Düsseldorf, in 1973. Christian was invited to participate in documenta 6 in 1977, but rejected this invitation. His work was included again in Documenta 7 in 1982.

After his first inclusion in Documenta, in 1972, he went on to have one-person exhibitions at the Museum Haus Lange, Krefeld (1978), at the Kunstmuseum, Düsseldorf (1983), at the Sprengel Museum, Hannover (1985, 1994), at the Musée des Beaux-Arts, Calais (1988) and at the Tallinna Kunstihoone, Estonia (1998). The Wilhelm Lehmbruck Museum, Duisburg exhibited 2000 his drawings and sculptures in an international presentation. This exhibition was accompanied by a book published by DuMont Verlag, Cologne. Exhibitions at the Weserburg Museum für moderne Kunst Bremen and at the Von der Heydt Museum in Wuppertal followed in 2003/2004. Kehrer Verlag in Heidelberg published a book for these exhibitions. An extensive collection of works by the artist were shown in the exhibition 'Abraham David Christian – 道 – The Way' 2010 at the Museum for Modern and Contemporary Art, Museum Küppersmühle Duisburg. The book for this exhibition was published by Kerber Verlag (Bielefeld-Leipzig-Berlin). 2020 the Kunstmuseum Bochum showed earth sculptures from the 1970s in the solo exhibition 'Abraham David Christian ERDE'. "Earth is available everywhere, it costs nothing. We took them straight from the field, seven tons, and cleaned them. The slush was poured into the containers, squeezing outward, creating bulges. I was very interested in this organic principle." (Abraham David Christian in a conversation with Helga Meister, Kunstforum, Volume 204, 2010, Conversations with Artists, p. 240)

Book publications include Selbst (Museum Haus Lange, Krefeld, 1978); Abraham David Christian; Forty Years of Work (Sprengel Museum Hannover 1985), Abraham David Christian, Mississippi (Tallinna Kunstihoone, Tallinn, Estonia, 1998); 'Abraham David Christian, La Salle des Pieds Perdus': Drawing / Zeichnung (Edgewise Press, New York, April 1999); 'Abraham David Christian, Nebraska' (Kulturzentrum Sinsteden, Rommerskirchen, 2000); 'Abraham David Christian, THE WAYS OF THE WORLD' (Wilhelm Lehmbruck Museum Duisburg, 2000) published by DuMont Verlag, Cologne,

The June 2001 issue of Art in America, featured an article by Janet Koplos on his work. Christian has been described as an "international artist whose work cannot be confined to any one country or defined by any one culture. Geometrical and shape-of-life forms reference the traditions of Eastern, Western, African and American cultures, even as they remain perfectly unique unto themselves. His paper and bronze sculptures convene the spirits of Renaissance art (Donatello and Michelangelo), the Classical abstract art of the avantgarde in the twentieth century (Giacometti, Brancusi, and David Smith), the most (so-called) ‘primitive’ objects from the smallest villages in Africa, and the most (so-called) ‘refined’ goddess or Buddha from India, Southeast Asia, or Japan. It is work that is both irrepressible and restrained, libidinal and Minimal, fragile and, of late, monumental. Before the term ‘multicultural’ ever existed, Christian's sculptures and drawings took for their most basic premises the ‘language [or languages] of man’ and the ‘ways of the world.’

'Abraham David Christian, Bronze Sculptures' (Kehrer, Heidelberg, 2003). Another monograph on his work was published by Kehrer in 2003, in conjunction with his museum exhibition, 'Abraham David Christian. The Language of Man', at the Neues Museum Weserburg Bremen and Von der Heydt-Museum Wuppertal in 2004, with essays by Thomas Deecke, Peter Friese, Hans-Jürgen Heinrichs and Richard Milazzo. In 2006, Christian published "Along the Hudson", a book of drawings, with Tokyo Publishing House. 2010 the book for the exhibition 'Abraham David Christian – 道 – The Way' 2010 at the Museum for Modern and Contemporary Art, Museum Küppersmühle Duisburg was published by Kerber Verlag (Bielefeld-Leipzig-Berlin). 'Abraham David Christian, SchwarzWald' was published by Tokyo Publishing House in 2015. 'Abraham David Christian, Silva Nigra' was published by Kehrer, Heidelberg, 2016. 2023/2024, the Bündner Kunstmuseum Chur showed an overview of the work of the sculptor in a concentrated presentation in the exhibition 'Abraham David Christian Oltre il linguaggio/Da i'autra vart da la lingua', in rooms of the Villa Planta, designed by Peter Zumthor were designed. The exhibition was accompanied by a publication with photographs by Gaudenz Signorell. As part of the Bündner Kunstmuseum exhibition, sculptures by Abraham David Christian were precisely placed outdoors at selected locations in Graubünden: just as if the sculptures had been there for a long time. These included the 'Reformed Church of Avers-Cresta', the Saint John Abbey, Müstair, the Church of St. Peter Mistail, the church ruins of San Gaudenzio and Bondo GR in Bergell.

In 2020 Abraham's work 'Interconnected Sculpture' was exhibited at Art Düsseldorf.

== Personal life ==
Christian lives and works in New York City, Düsseldorf, Graubunden and Hayama, Japan.

== Awards ==
- 1978 Villa Romana prize

== Literature ==
- documenta 5 Befragung der Realität – Bildwelten heute; Bd 1: (Information); Bd 2: (Exhibition catalogue); Kassel 1972
- documenta 7 Kassel; Bd. 1: (Biographies of the artists); Bd. 2: (Exhibition catalogue); Kassel 1982 ISBN 3-920453-02-6
- Storck, Gerhard (Editor); [Selbst]; ABRAHAM DAVID CHRISTIAN; Museum Haus Lange, Krefeld, Exhibition catalogue, [Selbst] ABRAHAM DAVID CHRISTIAN, Haus Lange Krefeld, 29. – 19 January. March 1978; Krefeld 1978
- Honisch, Dieter (Editor); Kunst in der Bundesrepublik Deutschland : 1945 – 1985; Exhibition catalogue: 'Kunst in der Bundesrepublik Deutschland : 1945 – 1985', Nationalgalerie Berlin 27. September 1985 – 21. January 1986; Berlin 1985 ISBN 3-87584-158-1
- Weiermair, Peter; ABRAHAM DAVID CHRISTIAN, Paper Sculptures, Mannheimer Kunstverein, Mannheim; Exhibition catalogue, Mannheim; 1985
- Deecke, Thomas; Metasprache, Michael Erlhoff, Unumwunden, Antje v. Graevenitz, Reisevergleiche, Christian Schneider, disziplinar, Exhibition catalogue ABRAHAM DAVID CHRISTIAN; FORTY YEARS OF WORK · VIERZIG JAHRE ARBEIT; Sprengel Museum, Hannover 1985
- Collins & Milazzo; ABRAHAM DAVID CHRISTIAN, SCULPTURE; Diane Brown Gallery, Exhibition catalogue; New York 1987
- Le Nouene, Patrick (Hrsg.); Gestes Blancs Parmiles Solitudes / Gestures Amid Solitude, Collins & Milazzo, Chinatown, U.S.A., Christian Schneider, La Leçon du Vide / Being Taught About Naught; Exhibition catalogue, ABRAHAM DAVID CHRISTIAN, SCULPTURE in the Musée des Beaux-Arts, Calais and in the Gatodo Gallery, Tokyo; Calais / Tokyo 1988
- Nobis, Norbert (Herg.); FLORENZ '78; Sprengel Museum, Hannover; Exhibition catalogue, Sprengel Museum, Hannover 1994, ISBN 3-8916-9079-7
- Deecke, Thomas, Abraham David Christian – der Fremde; Kritisches Lexikon für Gegenwartskunst, München 1997
- Merkert, Jörn [Hrsg.]; Gesammelte Räume gesammelte Träume. Kunst aus Deutschland von 1960 bis 2000. Bilder und Räume aus der Sammlung Grothe - Grothe Collection im / in the Martin-Gropius-Bau, Exhibition catalogue, Martin-Gropius-Bau, Berlin, 20. November 1999 bis 6. February 2000, Berlin/Cologne 1999, ISBN 978-3-77014-872-1
- Smerling, Walter (Hrsg.); Sammlung Grothe, Museum Küppersmühle, Duisburg, Exhibition catalogue, MKM Museum Küppersmühle für Moderne Kunst Duisburg, Köln, 1999, ISBN 3-7701-4870-3
- Milazzo, Richard (Editor); ABRAHAM DAVID CHRISTIAN, LA SALLE DES PIEDS PERDUS, ZEICHNUNG / DRAWING; New York, Paris, Turin, Louisville 1999 ISBN 1-893207-01-3
- Brockhaus, Christoph (Editor); Abraham David Christian, die Wege der Welt; Exhibition catalogue, Abraham David Christian, die Wege der Welt, Wilhelm-Lehmbruck-Museum Duisburg 20. – 30 February. April 2000; Köln 2000 ISBN 3-7701-5051-1
- Janet Koplos; Abraham David Christian – A pilgrim's projects, Art in America No. 6 (June 2001) p. 116-121, 143
- Friese, Peter (Editor); Abraham David Christian – Die Sprache des Menschen; Exhibition catalogue: Abraham David Christian – Die Sprache des Menschen, Neues Museum Weserburg Bremen, 16. November 2003 – 29. February 2004, Von-der-Heydt-Museum Wuppertal, 16. March – 18. Mai 2004; Heidelberg 2003 ISBN 3-936636-10-9
- Smerling, Walter (Editor); ABRAHAM DAVID CHRISTIAN, THE WAY • DER WEG, Exhibition catalogue: ABRAHAM DAVID CHRISTIAN, THE WAY • DER WEG, MKM Museum Küppersmühle für Moderne Kunst Duisburg, Kerber Verlag, Bielefeld/Leipzig/Berlin; 2010 ISBN 978-3-86678-412-3
- Forstbauer, Nikolai B. / Metzger, Rainer / Milazzo, Richard; ABRAHAM DAVID CHRISTIAN, TIEFENBRONN; Exhibition catalogue: ABRAHAM DAVID CHRISTIAN, TIEFENBRONN; St. Maria Magdalena, Tiefenbronn, Heidelberg 2014, ISBN 978-3-86828-526-0.
- Yokota, Shigeru (Editor); ABRAHAM DAVID CHRISTIAN, SchwarzWald; Tokyo Publishing House, Tokyo 2015
- Kunstmuseum Pforzheim (Editor); ABRAHAM DAVID CHRISTIAN, Silva Nigra; Exhibition catalogue: ABRAHAM DAVID CHRISTIAN, Silva Nigra; Kunstmuseum Pforzheim, 23. Oktober 2016 – 19. März 2017, Heidelberg 2016, ISBN 978-3-86828-755-4
- Költzsch, Erika (Editor); ABRAHAM DAVID CHRISTIAN, Zeichnungen und Skulpturen / Drawings and Sculptures; Exhibition catalogue: ABRAHAM DAVID CHRISTIAN, Zeichnungen und Skulpturen / Drawings and Sculptures, Galerie Haas, 1. June – 17. July 2018, Zürich 2018
- Yokota, Shigeru (Editor); ABRAHAM DAVID CHRISTIAN, 三十; Tokyo Publishing House, Tokyo 2018
- Haas, Michael (Editor); ABRAHAM DAVID CHRISTIAN; Exhibition catalogue: ABRAHAM DAVID CHRISTIAN, Galerie Haas & KUNST LAGER HAAS, 26. April – 15. June 2019, Berlin 2019
- Jung, Jörg (Editor); ABRAHAM DAVID CHRISTIAN · EISEN; Cologne 2019
- Golinski, Hans Günter (Editor); ABRAHAM DAVID CHRISTIAN · ERDE; Bochum 2020; Exhibition catalogue: ABRAHAM DAVID CHRISTIAN · ERDE, Kunstmuseum Bochum, 5. July 2020 - 11. October 2020
- Yokota, Shigeru (Editor); ABRAHAM DAVID CHRISTIAN, 百八; Tokyo Publishing House, Tokyo 2020
- Mönig, Roland; ABRAHAM DAVID CHRISTIAN, Jenseits der Sprache/Beyond Language; Exhibition catalogue: Iron Sculptures Galerie Utermann, Dortmund 4. June - 10. July 2021
- Kunz, Stephan; ABRAHAM DAVID CHRISTIAN, Oltre il linguaggio/Da i'autra vart da la lingua; Exhibition catalogue: ABRAHAM DAVID CHRISTIAN, Oltre il linguaggio/Da i'autra vart da la lingua, Bündner Kunstmuseum Chur, Chur, 16. September 2023 bis 7. January 2024, ISBN 978-3-905240-79-5
