= Johan Thorn Prikker =

Dutch artist (1868–1932)

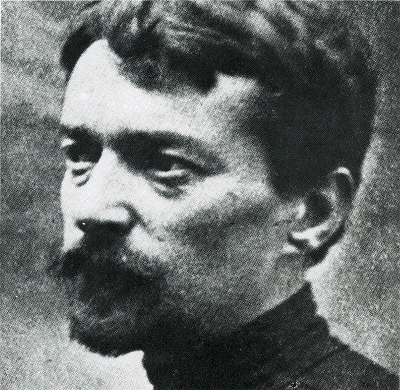
- Photograph c.1900
- Born: June 5, 1868; The Hague
- Died: March 5, 1932 (aged 63); Cologne
- Known for: Painting
- Movement: Art Nouveau

Johan Thorn Prikker (6 June 1868 - 5 March 1932) was a Dutch artist who worked in Germany after 1904. His activities were very eclectic, including architecture, lithography, furniture, stained-glass windows, mosaics, tapestries and book covers, as well as painting. He also worked in a variety of styles, such as Symbolism, Impressionism and Art Nouveau.

== Biography ==
Prikker was born and raised in The Hague, Netherlands. He was the son of a house painter. From 1881 to 1887, he was enrolled at the Royal Academy of Art, but left without completing his studies. In 1890, his friend Jan Toorop introduced him to the work of the Belgian art group, Les XX, who he exhibited with. Two years later, Joséphin Péladan gave him a similar introduction to the Salon de la Rose + Croix. Much of his painting, in the Symbolist style, was done during this period, from 1891 to 1895.

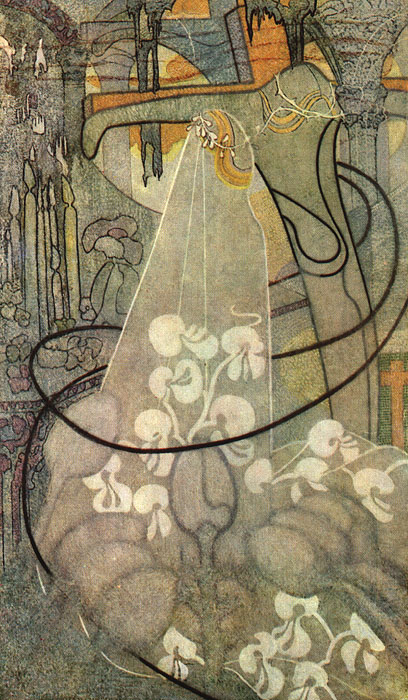
The Bride (1892)

In 1898, he became artistic director of the "Arts & Crafts" gallery in The Hague, which sold many Art Nouveau items and furnishings in addition to art works. He began designing furniture at this time, inspired by the work of Henry Van de Velde, who he had met in Belgium. That same year, he was married, but his wife died from a miscarriage only a year later. In 1900, he had a falling-out with the gallery's founder, Chris Wegerif (1859-1920), and resigned. The following year he joined with Van de Velde and Johan Coenraad Altorf to create the "Villa De Zeemeeuw" (seagull) in Scheveningen for the dermatologist and art patron W.J.H. Leuring (?-1936); striving to make it a true Gesamtkunstwerk. For the villa's staircase, he created a large mural of a Christ-figure within an intricate geometric framework. Positioned on the back wall above the staircase, the work seamlessly integrates with the architectural space and is immediately visible upon entry.

Despite this success, the clash between his aesthetics and the prevailing art styles, which was behind his departure from the gallery, continued. In addition, his political beliefs caused him to receive bad press (he was an anarchist when most of the Dutch art world favored socialism), which had a negative effect on his ability to obtain work. In 1904, he decided to move to Germany.

With help from the art historian and museum director, Friedrich Deneken, he was able to obtain a teaching position in Krefeld at the new "Handwerker- und Kunstgewerbeschule". This gave him a free hand to create furniture and fabric designs. He also took his students on field trips to show them the pleasures of painting en plein air.

In 1910, he left Krefeld for Hagen to participate in the avant-garde movement being sponsored and promoted by Karl Ernst Osthaus. He soon received numerous commissions for murals, mosaics and stained-glass windows, including those at the Gesellenhaus (meeting hall) in Neuss, designed by Peter Behrens. During his stay in Hagen, he was a teacher at the Kunstgewerbeschule in Essen from 1913, and remarried. His son from that marriage, Heinrich became a well-known professional motorcycle racer. During the years 1917 and 1918 in Essen, he taught the young Josef Albers his stained-glass making techniques, which impacted greatly Albers’ oeuvre.

After a short stay in Überlingen from 1919 to 1920, he moved to Munich, where he taught glass-painting and monumental art, then transferred to the Kunstakademie Düsseldorf in 1923, followed by the Cologne Art and Craft Schools in 1926. He remained there until his death. During his last decade, he focused on mosaics and stained-glass. His 1930 windows in the Church of St. Georg in Cologne played a fundamental role in shaping post-war stained glass in Germany, influencing the early stylistic phases of artist Georg Meistermann.

== Selected works ==
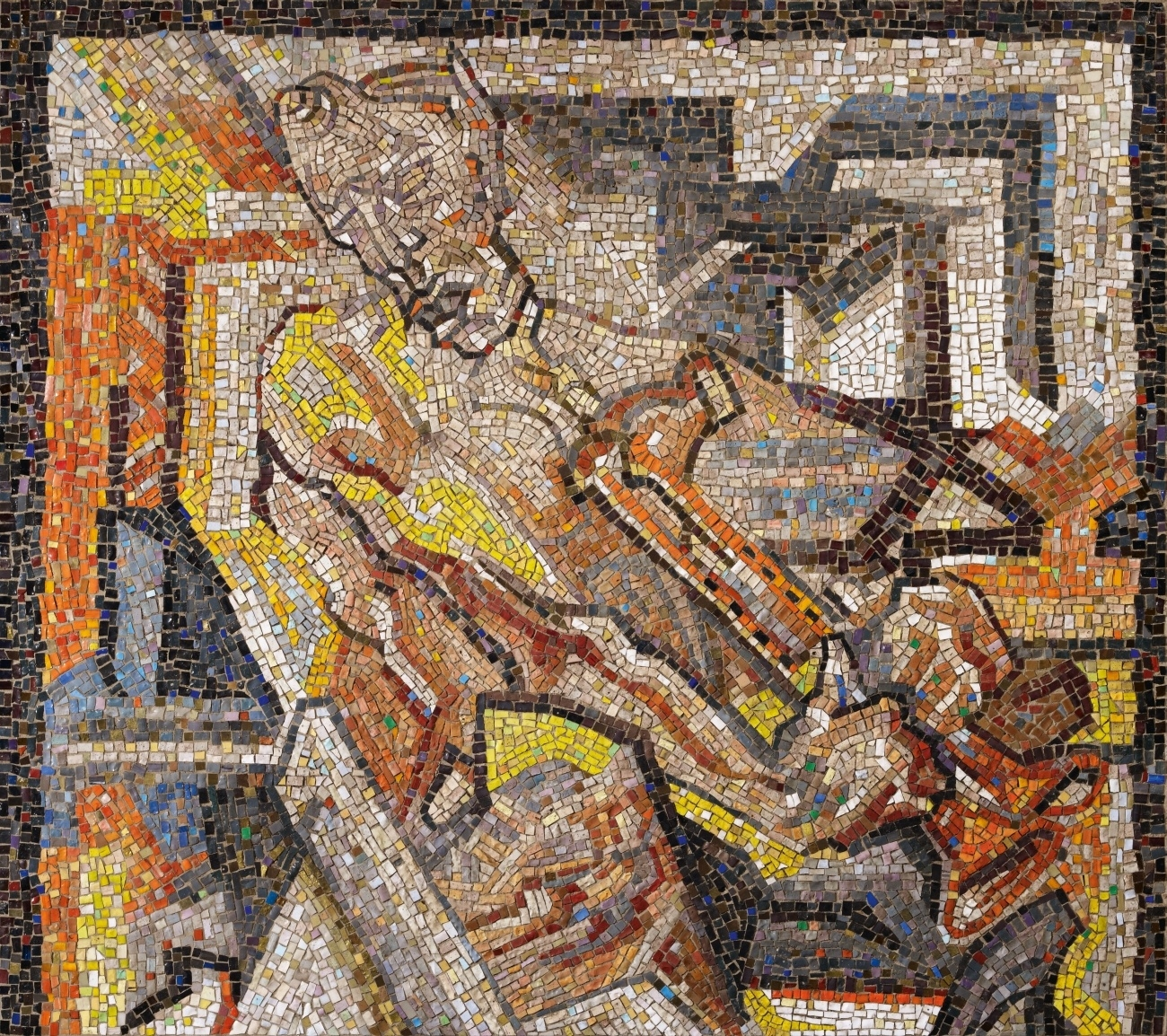
Sacred and Secular Music

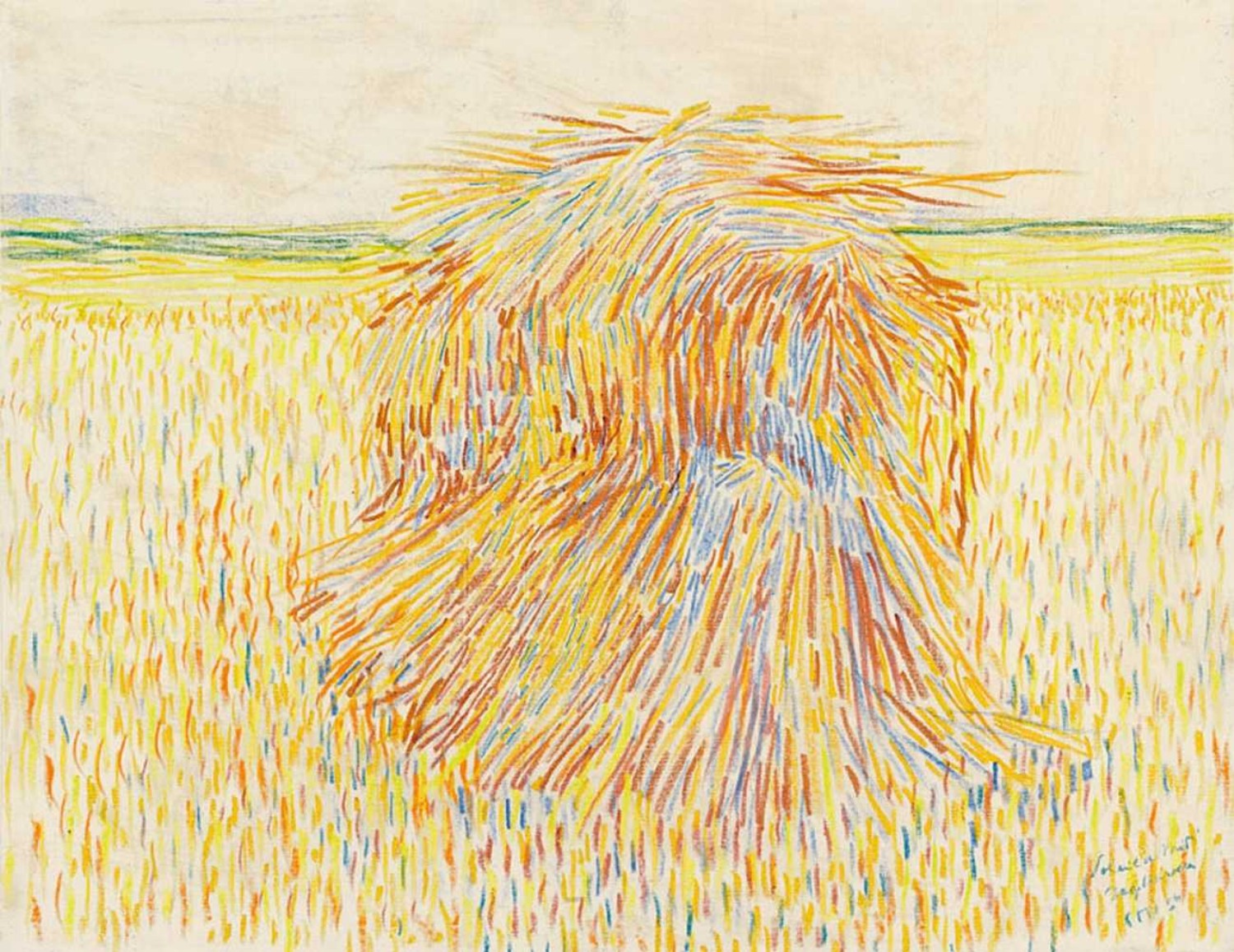
Mid-day Sun

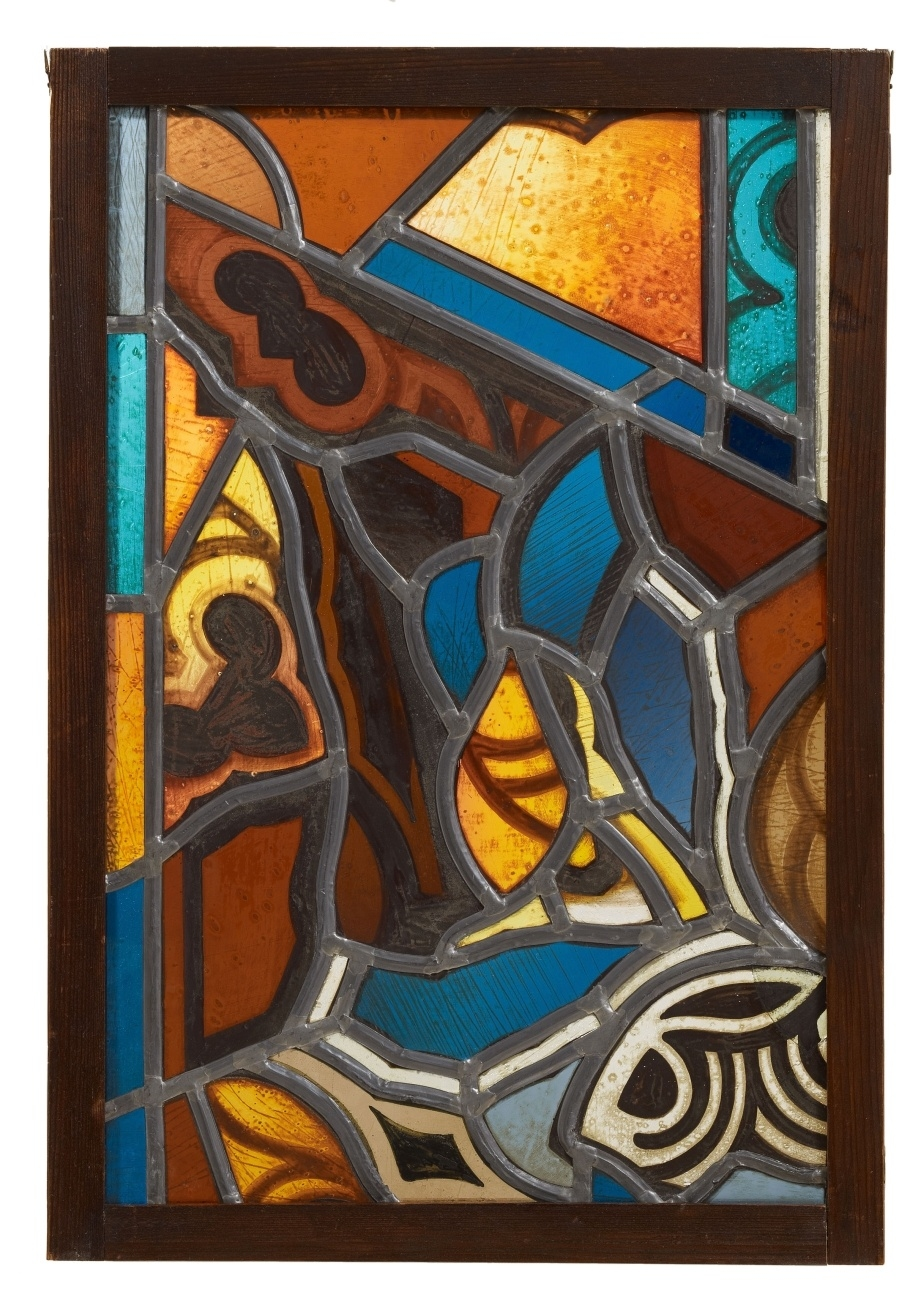
Abstract Composition

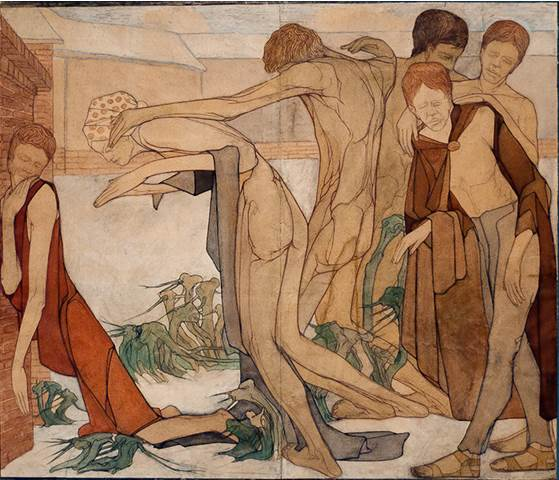
The Blind
