= Jörg Sasse =

German photographer (born 1962)

- Born: 1962 (age 63–64); Bad Salzuflen, West Germany
- Education: Bernd Becher
- Known for: photography
- Movement: Düsseldorf School of Photography
- Website: Official website

Jörg Sasse (born Bad Salzuflen, 1962) is a German photographer. His work uses found images that are scanned, pixelated and manipulated. He lives and works in Berlin.

In 2003 Sasse won the Cologne Fine Art Award and in 2005 was shortlisted for the Deutsche Börse Photography Foundation Prize. His work is held in the collections of the Belvedere, Fotomuseum Winterthur, Solomon R. Guggenheim Museum and the Städel.

== Life and work ==
Sasse attended the Kunstakademie Düsseldorf from 1982 to 1988, where he studied under Bernd Becher. Since 1994 his work has involved digitally manipulating found images — primarily landscapes and cityscapes. "He developed a process of scanning images into his computer, changing them, and then making film negatives of these manipulated images, from which the final prints are made."

Sasse is no longer a photographer in the traditional sense. He uses other people's photographs from many different and random sources, such as photo albums and flea markets as templates that serve as the basis for his new images. Sasse carries a process of collaging and altering the original material on the computer. Sasse changes lots of the elements found in the original photographs, such as details, perspective, color, sharpness, etc. The final results of his work are images whose origin is often no longer recognizable. They present a new but flawed reality. In his play with the reality depicted in the photographs, Sasse succeeds in confusing the viewer when he looks more closely to them, which arise from contradictions between everyday experience and perception (e.g. by seemingly abolishing the central perspective). Sasse usually gives the photograph titles as four-digit number combinations, so that the references to the objects depicted are absent, as well as the creation of an intended new object.

In his photographic work, Sasse deals with the everyday life and culture, like they are depicted in the works of amateur photographers. The starting points from his work were an early collection of amateur photographs, as well when he started to photograph, since the 1980s, everyday interiors, corresponding details and shop windows. In view of the possibilities offered by computer technology, since around 1990 he increasingly concentrated on editing other people's photographs, and in 1993 he published his first image created in this manner, a so-called "tableau".

He calls the works resulting from his sketches, "tableaux"; they have been the focus of his work since the 1990s. They are large-format images, some of them are highly distorted and distance themselves from any engagement with everyday life. They are characterized by a kind of painterly component.

Sasse's work Speicher I, first exhibited at the Musée National d'Art Moderne, in Paris, in 2008, is a three-dimensional sculpture containing 512 images. The work is the analogy of a complex digital database that allows to create a wide variety of suspended walls in 56 different categories. The work has been on display in its own room at the Kunstmuseum Bonn since 2010.

In addition to the “Tableaux”, there has been a Lost Memories series since 2009, whose photographic origins are not immediately obvious. As with his "tableaux", all decisions about the image are made in the editing process on the computer. The memory of something previously seen, often created in other works, is transferred in “Lost Memories” to the tension between the perception of photographic color spaces and the associations with organic structures.

== Publications ==
=== Books of work by Sasse ===
- Vierzig Fotografien 1984 – 1991. Munich: Schirmer/Mosel, 1992. ISBN 9783888144653. With texts by Gerda Breuer and Thomas Lange.
- Arbeiten am Bild. Kunsthalle Bremen; Munich: Schirmer/Mosel, 2001. ISBN 9783829600316. With texts by Sasse, Andreas Kreul and Detlef Bernhard Linke.
- Tableaux & Esquisses. Museum of Grenoble; Munich: Schirmer/Mosel, 2004. ISBN 9783829601726. With a text by Guy Tosatto.
- Tableaus & Skizzen 2004/2005, Kunstmuseum Bonn; Kunstverein Hannover; Munich: Schirmer/Mosel, 2005. ISBN 9783829602167. With texts by Stefan Gronert, Stephan Berg and Martin Engler.
- Skizzen – Der Grenoble Block. Munich: Schirmer/Mosel, 2006. ISBN 9783829602686. With texts by Sasse and Tosatto, in English, French, and German.
- d8207. Cologne: Walther König, 2007. ISBN 9783865602572.

=== Publications with contributions by Sasse ===
- The Düsseldorf School of Photography. New York: Aperture, 2010. Germany: Schirmer/Mosel, 2010. Edited by Stefan Gronert. Includes work by Bernd and Hilla Becher, Laurenz Berges, Elger Esser, Andreas Gursky, Candida Höfer, Axel Hütte, Simone Nieweg, Thomas Ruff, Sasse, Thomas Struth, and Petra Wunderlich; a foreword by Lothar Schirmer, an essay by Gronert, and summary biographies, exhibition lists and bibliographies for each of the photographers. ISBN 978-1-59711-136-2.

== Awards ==
- 2003: Cologne Fine Art Award, Art Cologne, Cologne, Germany
- 2005: Shortlisted, Deutsche Börse Photography Foundation Prize, The Photographers' Gallery, London

== Public collections ==
Sasse's work is held, among others, in the following public collections:

- Belvedere, Vienna, Austria
- Fotomuseum Winterthur, Winterthur, Switzerland: 2 prints (as of December 2020)
- Solomon R. Guggenheim Museum, New York: 2 prints (as of December 2020)
- Städel, Frankfurt, Germany: 6 prints (as of December 2020)

== Films about Sasse ==
- Skizzen und Tableaux (Buchhandlung König, 2017) – by Ralph Goertz; 34 minutes
