= Simone Nieweg =

German landscape photographer

- Born: 1962 (age 62–63); Bielefeld, North Rhine-Westphalia, West Germany
- Known for: photography
- Movement: Düsseldorf School of Photography

Simone Nieweg (born 1962) is a German photographer. She photographs agricultural landscapes in rural Germany. She lives and works in Düsseldorf.

She has had solo exhibitions at The National Museum of Photography, Film & Television in Bradford, UK and at Kunsthalle Bielefeld, Germany. Nieweg's work is held in several public collections, including the Contemporary Art Museum St. Louis, Huis Marseille, Museum for Photography, the Museum of Modern Art in New York, the Saint Louis Art Museum, San Francisco Museum of Modern Art and the Victoria and Albert Museum.

== Life and work ==
Nieweg was born in Bielefeld, Ostwestfalen-Lippe, North Rhine-Westphalia, Germany.

She attended the Kunstakademie Düsseldorf between 1984 and 1990, where she studied under Bernd Becher. She completed her studies as his master student. She uses a large format camera. She belongs to the second generation of Becher students. From 2005 to 2006, Nieweg was artist in residence at the Cité internationale des arts, in Paris.

Nieweg photography is based on nature. People are absent from her photographs. Her subjects tend to appear calm and rural: they are fields, meadows, allotments, grain fields, vegetable patches; there are also pumpkins, savoy cabbage and turnips, along with garden fences and garden sheds.

Between 1986 and 2012, Nieweg explored "the German tradition of "Grabeland," a unique community gardening system practiced on the outskirts of urban centers." She "photographed the agricultural landscape found on the outskirts of towns and industrial areas in the Rühr and Lower Rhine. Plots of unused land, leased out for one year, are transformed into richly planted allotments, after which they are ploughed and left unseeded." Because of the temporary nature of the lease, tenants do not build permanent huts and stable sheds, as is usual in allotment gardens, but use meagre means to assemble small, wobbly sheds for equipment. "Nieweg photographs subjects such as gates, fields and allotments. All show individuality, reflecting the personality of their owners: sheds held together with wire and corrugated iron tacked haphazardly to wooden frames; rickety structures, that, despite their impermanence, have been carefully built." This work was published in the books Felder und Gärten (1996), Grabeland (2001), Landschaften und Gartenstücke (2002), and Nature Man-Made (2012).

== Publications ==
=== Books of work by Nieweg ===
- Felder und Gärten. Westfälischer Kunstverein, Münster, 1996, ISBN 3-925047-37-9. With a text by Volker Kahmen.
- Grabeland. Bonn: Rheinisches Landesmuseum Bonn, 2001. With a text by Christoph Schaden.
- Landschaften und Gartenstücke.. Munich: Schirmer/Mosel, 2002. ISBN 978-3-8296-0040-8. With texts by Els Barents, Saskia Asser and Andrea Domelse.
- Natur der Menschen. Munich: Schirmer/Mosel, 2012. With a text by Heinz Liesbrock.
  - Nature Man-Made. Munich: Schirmer/Mosel, 2012. ISBN 978-3-8296-0583-0.
- Der Wald, Die Bäume, Das Licht: Photographien. Munich: Schirmer/Mosel, 2016. ISBN 978-3-8296-0750-6.

=== Publications with contributions by Nieweg ===
- Art Photography Now. New York: Aperture, 2005. By Susan Bright. ISBN 978-1-59711-026-6.
- The Düsseldorf School of Photography. New York: Aperture, 2010. Germany: Schirmer/Mosel, 2010. Edited by Stefan Gronert. Includes work by Bernd and Hilla Becher, Laurenz Berges, Elger Esser, Andreas Gursky, Candida Höfer, Axel Hütte, Nieweg, Thomas Ruff, Jörg Sasse, Thomas Struth, and Petra Wunderlich; a foreword by Lothar Schirmer, an essay by Gronert, and summary biographies, exhibition lists and bibliographies for each of the photographers. ISBN 978-1-59711-136-2.

== Solo exhibitions ==
- Landscapes and Gardens, The National Museum of Photography, Film & Television, Bradford, UK, 2004
- Natur der Menschen = nature man-made, Quadrat Bottrop, Bottrop, Germany, 2012
- Gärten/Felder = gardens/fields, Kunsthalle Bielefeld, Bielefeld, Germany, 2012

== Public collections ==
Nieweg's work is held in the following public collections:

- Contemporary Art Museum St. Louis, St. Louis, Missouri
- Huis Marseille, Museum for Photography, Amsterdam: 8 prints (as of December 2020)
- Museum of Modern Art, New York: 6 prints (as of December 2020)
- Saint Louis Art Museum, St. Louis, Missouri
- San Francisco Museum of Modern Art, San Francisco, California: 5 prints (as of December 2020)
- Victoria and Albert Museum, London: 3 prints (as of December 2020)
