= Tata Ronkholz =

German photographer

- Born: 1940; Krefeld, Germany
- Died: 1997 (aged 56–57); Cologne, Germany
- Known for: Photography, design

Tata Ronkholz (1940–1997) was a German photographer and designer. She was a member of the Düsseldorf School of Photography.

== Biography ==
Ronkholz was born in Krefeld under the maiden name Roswitha Tölle. From 1961 to 1965 she studied architecture and interior design at the Werkkunstschule Krefeld. After working at the Schroer furniture store in Krefeld from 1965 to 1966, she worked as a freelance product designer until 1977. She came into contact with photography through her husband Coco Ronkholz, who was responsible for producing a catalogue for Bernd Becher. In 1977, Ronkholz began studying at the Kunstakademie Düsseldorf. She studied under Bernd Becher, from 1978 to 1985, making her one of Becher's first students at the Düsseldorf Academy, alongside Andreas Gursky, Candida Höfer, Axel Hütte, Thomas Ruff and Thomas Struth, which later became known as the Becher School or the Düsseldorf School of Photography. After completing her studies, she stopped taking photographs for economic reasons and worked in a Cologne photo agency from 1985 to 1995 for living. In 1997, Tata Ronkholz died at Kendenich Castle near Cologne. In Düsseldorf she was taught by Bernd Becher.

== Work ==
Ronkholz's early work was characterized by a strict, constructivist style. Even before she began studying with Bernd and Hilla Becher in 1978, she took her first black-and-white photographs of industrial gates, with a plate camera, and only in the winter months so that vegetation did not obscure the structure of the gates. In addition to that motif, she also focused on drinking halls, shop windows and Düsseldorf's Rheinauhafen. She recorded numerous photographs in her carefully kept archive books.

She began documenting Düsseldorf's Rheinauhafen in 1978, commissioned by and in collaboration with Thomas Struth from whose collection the Stadtmuseum Düsseldorf purchased 82 works in 1981. When Struth had to interrupt her photographic work in 1980, Ronkholz devoted herself solely to the interiors of the harbor. Similar to the drinking halls that were built later, she created a photographic archive of industrial buildings. The transience of the motifs was important to her, like she stated: "This wonderful world is no longer there. I wanted to capture it before everything was torn down and gone." The most extensive group of her works was that of the drinking halls. Ronkholz found her motifs in Düsseldorf, Bochum and Cologne, as well as in other places of the Ruhr area. She emphasized: "I was not interested in a social aspect or in the design, but felt attracted to everyday life. I wanted to show the kiosk around the corner in all its charm.” This need of her probably also originated her gallery of “shop windows”, which she photographed before giving up her independent photographic activity in 1985. In Düsseldorf she was taught by Bernd Becher.

== Estate ==
The photographer's artistic estate has been managed by VAN HAM Art Estate since 2011. This includes her prints, contacts and negatives as well as parts of her correspondence and designs from her earlier work as an interior designer. The written estate has also been at the same location since 2011. In 2018, VAN HAM Art Estate founded a committee of experts to scientifically manage her estate.

== Public collections ==
Her work is in the collections of the Metropolitan Museum of Art, Museum of Fine Arts Houston, Die Photographische Sammlung/SK Stiftung Kultur the San Francisco Museum of Modern Art, and the Städel Museum, Frankfurt.
