= Laurenz Berges =

German photographer

- Born: 1966 (age 59–60); Cloppenburg, West Germany
- Known for: photography
- Movement: Düsseldorf School of Photography
- Website: Official website

Laurenz Berges (born Cloppenburg, 1966) is a German photographer. He is associated with the Düsseldorf School of Photography.

== Early career ==
Berges studied communication design at the University of Essen from 1986 to 1993, where he graduated with a diploma. In 1988 and 1989, Berges worked as a photo assistant for the photographer Evelyn Hofer in New York. He studied photography at Kunstakademie Düsseldorf, since 1992. He graduated as a Master Student under Bernd Becher, in 1996. Berges lives and works in Düsseldorf. Berges' work is held in several important museums, including the Museum of Modern Art, in New York and the San Francisco Museum of Modern Art.

== Work ==
Berges' photographic work focuses primarily on transience. Between 1991 and 1995, Berges photographed the interiors of East German barracks that had been abandoned by the Red Army after the collapse of the Soviet Union. In his book Etzweiler, Berges focus on Etzweiler, the district of Elsdorf that had to make way for open-pit lignite mining. He has photographed for years the wastelands in the de-industrialized city of Duisburg. Berges finds his subjects in the urban gray areas. He is particularly interested by the details from abandoned apartments, vacated houses, and overgrown gardens, that he makes the subject of a poetic, yet strictly documentary pictorial composition. In view of these photographs from the no-man's land between use and decay, recent past and foreseeable future, one could almost speak of the photographic equivalent of Arte Povera.

== Publications ==
=== Books of work by Berges ===
- Fotografien 1991–1995. Schirmer/Mosel, 2000. ISBN 978-3-88814-931-3. With a text by Ulrich Bischoff.
- Etzweiler. Schirmer/Mosel, 2005. ISBN 978-3-8296-0176-4. With a text by Michael Lentz.
- Frühauf – Danach. Schirmer/Mosel, 2011. ISBN 978-3-8296-0538-0. With a text by Thomas Weski.
- Cloppenburg. Kunstkreis, 2010. Edited by Barbara Hofmann-Johnson. ISBN 978-3-96098-526-6. Texts in English and German.

=== Publications with contributions by Berges ===
- The Düsseldorf School of Photography. New York: Aperture, 2010. Germany: Schirmer/Mosel, 2010. Edited by Stefan Gronert. Includes work by Bernd and Hilla Becher, Berges, Elger Esser, Andreas Gursky, Candida Höfer, Axel Hütte, Simone Nieweg, Thomas Ruff, Jörg Sasse, Thomas Struth, and Petra Wunderlich; a foreword by Lothar Schirmer, an essay by Gronert, and summary biographies, exhibition lists and bibliographies for each of the photographers. ISBN 978-1-59711-136-2.

== Public collections ==
Berges' work is held, among others, in the following public collections:

- Musée d'Art Moderne de Paris, Paris, France: 6 prints (as of December 2023)
- Museum of Modern Art, New York: 2 prints (as of December 2020)
- San Francisco Museum of Modern Art, San Francisco, California: 2 prints (as of December 2020)
