= Elger Esser =

German landscape photographer

- Born: 11 May 1967 (age 59); Stuttgart, West Germany
- Education: Bernd Becher
- Known for: photography
- Movement: Düsseldorf School of Photography
- Website: Official website

Elger Esser (born 11 May 1967) is a German landscape photographer. He is associated with the Düsseldorf School of Photography. He lives and works in Düsseldorf. "He is primarily associated with large-format images of European lowlands with his characteristic low horizon lines, pale luminous colours and vast skies".

Esser's work is held in many public collections such as the Rijksmuseum in Amsterdam and the Solomon R. Guggenheim Museum, Metropolitan Museum of Art and Museum of Modern Art in New York. He has won the Rheinischer Kunstpreis and the Oskar Schlemmer Prize.

== Career ==
Esser was born in Stuttgart, Germany and grew up in Rome. He is the son of the German writer Manfred Esser and the French photographer Régine Esser. He spent his childhood and youth in Rome, since the age of two. His father received a scholarship from the Villa Massimo in 1969 and his mother worked as a press photographer and Rome correspondent. He completed his high school diploma at the German School in Rome.

In 1986, he traveled with his father to Sicily to film the Friedrich Hölderlin's adaptation The Death of Empedocles by Jean-Marie Straub and Danièle Huillet.

In 1988, the sociologist Peter Kammerer, published the anthology Italien. Menschen Landschaften (Italy. Human Landscapes), in a book series, with texts from several authors, and photographs by Régine Esser, and the young Elger Esser.

In 1986, he moved to Düsseldorf, where he worked as a commercial photographer until 1991. He attended the Kunstakademie Düsseldorf between 1991 and 1997, where he studied under Bernd Becher. From 1996 he was a master student and received the Academy Certificate from the Art Academy in 1997.

In 1998, Esser received a DAAD travel grant for Italy. He traveled to Calabria and recorded his impressions in a travel diary and in documentary photographs. The photographs created cross-connections between his own text and his father's text from 1986. The travel descriptions of father and son, together with the photographs by Elger Esser, were published by Kehrer Verlag under the title Nach Italien.

From 2006 to 2009 Esser was professor of photography at Karlsruhe University of Arts and Design.

== Work ==
The central theme in Elger Esser's work is historical landscape photography. He finds his motifs on his travels through France, Scotland, Italy and the Netherlands. His imagery distances him from the documentary and objective working style of his academy teacher Bernd Becher.

He is influenced by the Romantic paintings of the 19th century and 19th-century photography, and also inspired by writers such as Gustave Flaubert, Marcel Proust and Guy de Maupassant. He seeks out beauty.

Esser's photographs of European rivers or river banks are large, quiet and deserted. Most of the time the horizon is low, as in the Dutch landscape paintings of the 17th century.

For his photography book Morgenland (2017), he travelled to Lebanon, Israel and Egypt (including along the Nile to Luxor and Aswan) between 2004 and 2015. Using an 8×10 large format camera His work depicts "luminous and unpeopled landscapes" with "glassy waters, still horizons[,] ancient ruins". shorelines, traditional feluccas and dahabeah sailing boats that "show off the area's mysticism, away from headlines about war and violence." 'Morgenland' is an old German term for the Middle East, meaning 'morning land'.

== Publications ==
=== Books of work by Esser ===
- Posed Spaces. Edited by Kulturforum Alte Post Neuss. With a text by Kerstin Stremmel.
- Veduten und Landschaften. With a text by Rupert Pfab. Siegen: Kunstverein Siegen, 1998.
- Vedutas and Landscapes 1996–2000. Munich: Schirmer/Mosel, 2000. ISBN 978-3-88814-936-8. With a text by Rupert Pfab and a conversation between Esser and Georg Elben.
- Nach Italien = To Italy. Heidelberg, Germany: Kehrer, 2000. Photographs by Esser and texts by Manfred Esser and Elger Esser. Edited by Thomas Schirmböck. ISBN 978-3-933257-20-8.
- Marne + Loire. Bologna: Pendragon, 2001. Edited by Galleria d'Arte Moderna, Villa delle Rose, Bologna.
- Olivo Barbieri – Elger Esser: Cityscapes / Landscapes. Cinisello Balsamo, Milan: Silvana 2002. Edited by Palazzo delle Papesse Centro Arte Contemporanea, Siena.
- Cap d'Antifer—Étretat. Munich: Schirmer/Mosel, 2002. ISBN 978-3-8296-0047-7. With excerpts from correspondence between Gustave Flaubert and Guy de Maupassant (1877) and an essay by Peter Foos.
- Elger Esser & Bae, Bien-U. Seoul: Gana Art Center, 2006.
- Ansichten/Views/Vues: Bilder aus dem Archiv. Munich: Schirmer/Mosel, 2008. ISBN 978-3-8296-0357-7. With a text by Alexander Pühringer.
- Eigenzeit = Proper Time. Munich: Schirmer/Mosel, 2009. Edited by Kunstmuseum Stuttgart. ISBN 978-3-8296-0418-5.
- Wrecks. Düsseldorf: self-published, 2009.
- Nocturnes à Giverny Munich: Schirmer/Mosel, 2012. ISBN 978-3-8296-0578-6.
- Zeitigen. Munich: Schirmer/Mosel, 2016. Edited by Pia Müller-Tamm/Staatliche Kunsthalle Karlsruhe.
- Combray. Munich: Schirmer/Mosel, 2016. ISBN 978-3-8296-0751-3.
- Morgenland. Munich: Schirmer/Mosel, 2017. ISBN 978-3-8296-0797-1.

=== Publications with contributions by Esser ===
- The Düsseldorf School of Photography. New York: Aperture, 2010. Germany: Schirmer/Mosel, 2010. Edited by Stefan Gronert. Includes work by Bernd and Hilla Becher, Laurenz Berges, Esser, Andreas Gursky, Candida Höfer, Axel Hütte, Simone Nieweg, Thomas Ruff, Jörg Sasse, Thomas Struth, and Petra Wunderlich; a foreword by Lothar Schirmer, an essay by Gronert, and summary biographies, exhibition lists and bibliographies for each of the photographers. ISBN 978-1-59711-136-2.

== Awards ==
- 2010: Rheinischer Kunstpreis. A €20,000 prize.
- 2016: Oskar Schlemmer Prize. A €25,000 prize.

== Public collections ==
Esser's work is held in the following public collections:

- Albright–Knox Art Gallery, Buffalo, New York
- Brooklyn Museum, Brooklyn, New York: 1 print (as of December 2020)
- Centre Pompidou, Paris: 1 print (as of December 2020)
- The Frances Young Tang Teaching Museum and Art Gallery, Skidmore College, Saratoga Springs, New York: 1 print (as of December 2020)
- Huis Marseille, Museum for Photography, Amsterdam: 1 print (as of December 2020)
- Metropolitan Museum of Art, New York: 1 print (as of December 2020)
- Mumok, Vienna, Austria: 1 print (as of December 2020)
- Museum der Moderne Salzburg, Salzburg, Austria
- Museum of Modern Art, New York: 1 print (as of December 2020)
- Rheinisches Landesmuseum Bonn, Bonn, Germany
- Rijksmuseum, Amsterdam: 11 prints (as of December 2020)
- Solomon R. Guggenheim Museum, New York: 1 print (as of December 2020)
- Stedelijk Museum Amsterdam, Amsterdam: 1 print (as of December 2020)
