= Ileana Sonnabend =

Romanian-American art dealer (1914-2007)

- Born: Ileana Schapira; October 29, 1914; Bucharest, Romania
- Died: October 21, 2007 (aged 92); Manhattan, New York City
- Education: Columbia University
- Occupation: Art dealer
- Years active: 1959–2002
- Spouse: Leo Castelli (1933–1959); Michael Sonnabend (1959–2001)
- Children: 2, including Nina Sundell and Antonio Homem (adopted)

Ileana Sonnabend (née Schapira, October 29, 1914 – October 21, 2007) was a Romanian-American art dealer of 20th-century art. The Sonnabend Gallery opened in Paris in 1962 and was instrumental in making American art of the 1960s known in Europe, with an emphasis on American pop art. In 1970, Sonnabend Gallery opened in New York on Madison Avenue, and in 1971 relocated to 420 West Broadway in SoHo where it was one of the major protagonists that made SoHo the international art center it remained until the early 1990s. The gallery was instrumental in making European art of the 1970s known in America, with an emphasis on European conceptual art and Arte Povera. It also presented American conceptual and minimal art of the 1970s. In 1986, the so-called "Neo-Geo" show introduced, among others, the artist Jeff Koons. In the late 1990s, the gallery moved to Chelsea and continues to be active after Sonnabend's death. The gallery goes on showing the work of artists who rose to prominence in the 1960s and 1970s including Robert Morris, Bernd and Hilla Becher and Gilbert & George as well as more recent artists including Jeff Koons, Rona Pondick, Candida Höfer, Elger Esser, and Clifford Ross.

== Life and work ==
Sonnabend was born Ileana Schapira in Bucharest to a Romanian Jewish father, Mihail Schapira, and his Viennese wife, Marianne Strate-Felber. Ileana Sonnabend received a degree in psychology from Columbia University.

Her father, Mihail Schapira, was a successful businessman and financial advisor to King Carol II of Romania. Sonnabend was, for many years, married to Leo Castelli, whom she met in Bucharest in 1932 and married soon after. The couple had a daughter, Nina Sundell. She and her husband left Europe during the 1940s and settled in New York City. During the 1940s, her mother Marianne Schapira divorced her father and met and married the Ukrainian-born American painter John D. Graham (who was a mentor figure to artists such as Jackson Pollock, Willem de Kooning, and Arshile Gorky). Graham also became a mentor to Ileana and Leo by introducing them to his artist friends in the New York art world. In 1950, the couple curated a show of young American and European painters, which included both Jean Dubuffet and Mark Rothko. After divorcing Castelli (with whom she remained lifelong friends) in 1959 she married Polish-born scholar Michael Sonnabend, whom she had met during the 1940s.

Two years later, they opened Galerie Ileana Sonnabend on Quai des Grands-Augustins in Paris, where she introduced art by Andy Warhol, Roy Lichtenstein and others, and helped establish a European market for their work. In 1965, they acquired an additional apartment on Ca' del Dose in Venice. In 1968, the couple closed the Paris showroom and moved back to New York. At one time, the couple thought that Michael Sonnabend would run the New York gallery while Ileana oversaw their Paris establishment, but he soon found that the art business did not suit him.

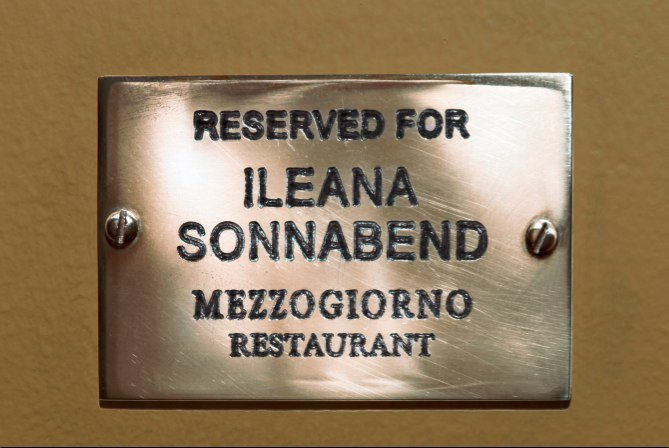
Plaque, Mezzogiorno restaurant, Spring Street

In 1971, she opened the Sonnabend Gallery, in a building at 420 West Broadway in Soho. The industrial chic restoration instantly became the center of the emerging SoHo art scene. She inaugurated her gallery with a performance by Gilbert & George. She exhibited American artists like Jeff Koons and Vito Acconci, and introduced European artists like Christo, Georg Baselitz, and Jannis Kounellis to U.S. audiences. When the performance artist Vito Acconci announced that his performance piece Seedbed called for him to masturbate in her gallery for two weeks in 1972, Sonnabend simply replied, "You do what you have to do."

In 2000, after she had closed her other galleries, Sonnabend and her adopted son Antonio Homem moved the SoHo gallery to West 22nd Street in Chelsea.

== Collection ==
After Sonnabend died in her Manhattan home in October 2007 at the age of 92, the estate tax return pegged her total worth at $876 million, triggering a $471m tax bill. Her heirs subsequently sold a portion of her postwar-art collection for $600 million—reportedly the largest private sale in history. Although the family had been in talks with the auction houses, they chose to sell parts of the collection privately because of the uncertainties surrounding the financial markets during the Great Recession. Backed by members of the Al Thani family, the art-dealers collective GPS Partners purchased $400m of paintings and sculptures dating mainly from the 1960s on behalf of private clients. This first cache is said to have included Jeff Koons's 1986 sculpture Rabbit, which has been valued in excess of $80 million, as well as Roy Lichtenstein's cartoon painting Eddie Diptych (1962), Cy Twombly's abstract Blue Room (1957) and Andy Warhol's Silver Disaster (1963), one of the artist's paintings of an electric chair. The second transaction, a selection of paintings by Warhol, was sold to Gagosian Gallery for a reported $200m. Among the Warhols sold by the heirs are Four Marilyns (1962); two paintings of Elizabeth Taylor; and three small paintings from the artist's "Death and Disaster" series.

In 2011, 59 paintings, sculptures, and photographs by 46 artists, selected from Sonnabend's personal collection, were shown in "Ileana Sonnabend: An Italian Portrait" at the Peggy Guggenheim Collection.

In 2014, the Museum of Modern Art in New York paid tribute to Sonnabend's legacy with an exhibition entitled, Ileana Sonnabend: Ambassador for the New (21 December 2013 – 21 April 2014). The exhibition included the work of approximately 40 artists, including Robert Rauschenberg, Jasper Johns, and Andy Warhol.
