= Salerno (photograph) =

Photograph by Andreas Gurksy

Salerno, also known as Salerno I, is a colour photograph created by German photographer Andreas Gursky in 1990. The picture marked a turning point in the artist's work.

== History and description ==
After departing from the initial influence of Bernd and Hilla Becher, Gursky started depicting large, epic landscapes, sometimes dwarfing human presence, in the 1980s. The current photograph marks a shift in the creative direction of the artist, when he started digitally manipulating his photographs. This picture of the port of Salerno, south Italy, is impressive in its scale, which seems reminiscent of the 19th century landscape painters.

The picture depicts the busy port of Salerno, with his ships and a large amount of multicolored vehicles and other cargo awaiting transport, while the small houses are also visible, and the surrounding mountains, at the background. According to Finn Blythe: "Juxtaposing size with detail: the multi-colour cargo awaiting transit, the bustling port and miniature houses, each section of the photograph offers up its own depth that demands hours of individual inspection. This is a constant for Gursky, whose photographs hover between micro and macro both in terms of perspective: the enormous image with microscopic detail, and theme: the local place that reveals a universal zeitgeist of modernity."

From this point, Gursky pictures started to use a large-scale, high-resolution format of human made creations, like airports, stock exchanges, buildings, landscapes, often omitting or downplaying human presence, which have been a constant of his work. Gursky stated on this picture: "I saw immediately that pattern, that pictorial density, that industrial aesthetic. This image became an important piece for me, a turning point. It opened up a new sense of possibility, stylistically and thematically. I tried photographing other ports, but I realised that wasn't what had made the Salerno image work. It was the balance between great scale and a huge amount of sharp detail."

== Public collections ==
A print of the photograph, with the dimensions of 170.18 cm by 205.11 cm, is held at the San Francisco Museum of Modern Art.
