= Martin Rosswog =

German photographer

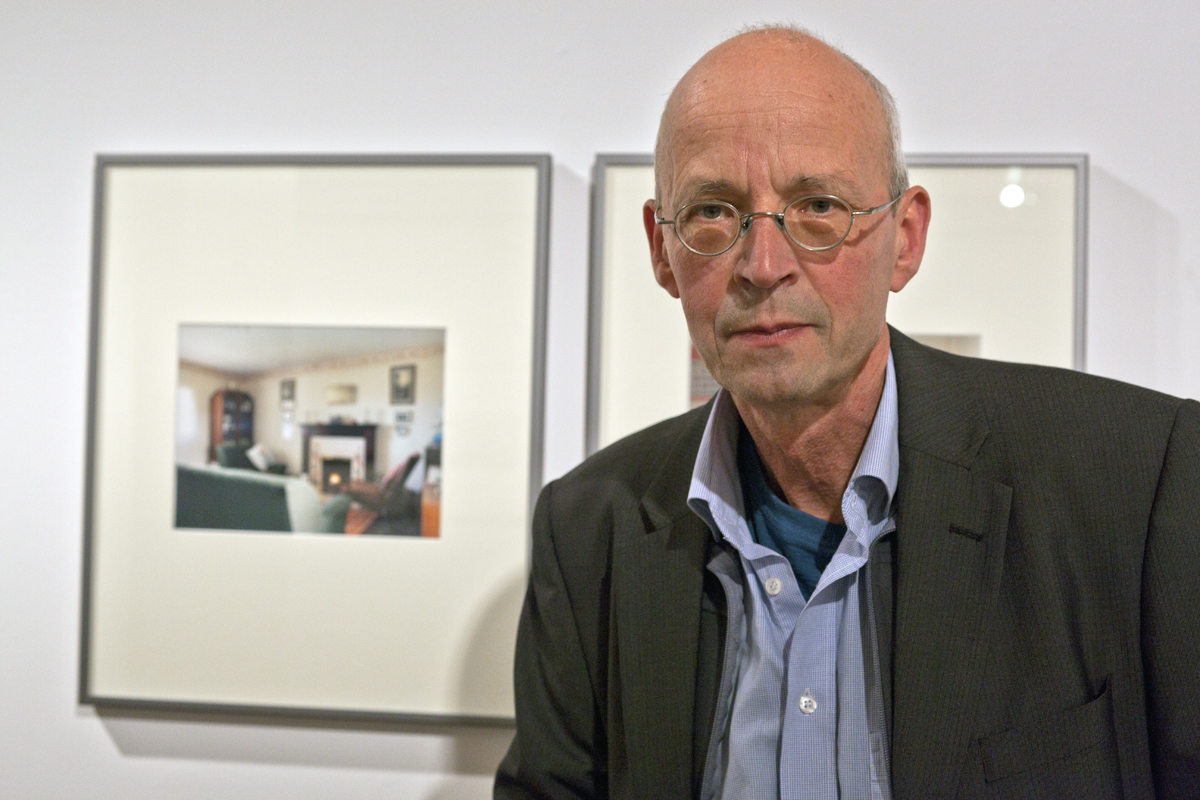
- Born: 31 May 1950 (age 76); Bergisch Gladbach, West Germany
- Education: Bernd Becher
- Known for: photography
- Movement: Düsseldorf School of Photography
- Website: Martin Rosswog website

Martin Rosswog (born 31 May 1950 in Bergisch Gladbach) is a German photographer. He is associated with the Düsseldorf School of Photography, as a student of Bernd Becher. He lives and works in Lindlar.

== Early career ==
After studying social education during the first half of the 1970s, he worked freelance as a media educator and photographer, from 1977 to 1981. Rosswog studied supervision from 1980 to 1982, in Kassel. He afterwards went to study photography at the Düsseldorf Art Academy, in 1982. After his undergraduate studies, he attended Bernd Becher's class, since 1983. He completed his studies in 1987 as a master student of Becher.

== Work ==
In the 1980s and 1990s, Martin Rosswog created an extensive group of photographic portraits following August Sander's systematics. Inspired by Bernd Becher, towards the end of his studies he portrayed former miners from the disused Zollern II/IV mine in text and images. Rosswog continued to follow the documentary practice of his masters Bernd and Hilla Becher.

In 1989, Rosswog began a large-scale documentary work on the interiors of traditional European rural homes. Rosswog systematically took photographs in many countries, including Ireland, Great Britain, Russia, Finland, Romania, and Hungary. These photographs document traditional forms of housing that give an impression of pre-industrial life and living in the countryside, as well as their current development facing social changes. At the same time, they document interior furnishings and room decorations that have since often disappeared. Rosswog photographs both in black and white and in color. He almost exclusively uses large-format cameras. In this way, he avoids the sense of artificiality caused by unnatural light and underlines the documentary character of his work, which can be classified as social documentary photography.

In addition to these works, which have been reproduced in several publications, Rosswog also takes photographs of the exterior views and the surroundings of the interior spaces that he documents. For example, in 2003 and 2004 he photographed the changes taking place in the village of Vurpar (Burgberg) in Transylvania, Romania, as a result of the departure of the Transylvanian Saxons.

== Exhibitions ==
- 1990 Oberbergisches Museum Schloss Homburg, Nümbrecht
- 1994 Edgar Faure Gallery, Paris
- 1996 Hungarian National Museum, Budapest
- 1998 Hof Art Association, Hof/Bavaria
- 2000 Municipal Gallery, Plovdiv, Bulgaria
- 2002 Danube Swabian Central Museum Ulm
- 2005 Retrospective. Rheinisches Landesmuseum Bonn
- 2006 Brukenthal Museum, Sibiu, Romania
- 2008 Technology and Conference Center Marburg
- 2009 East Slovak Gallery, Kosice, Slovakia
- 2011 Rheinisches Landesmuseum Bonn, Germany
- 2015 Photographic collection of the SK Stiftung Kultur – Along Europe
- 2020 in the series Ortstermin : “It will have been once” Jutta Dunkel – Martin Rosswog, Villa Zanders

== Publications ==
- Rückblende – Befragung einer Generation (1985), Cologne
- Menschenbilder (1989), Cologne
- Schichtaufnahmen, Erinnerungen an die Zeche Zollern II/IV (1994), Essen
- Ländliche Innenräume (1996), Munich
- Asylbilder (1996), Cologne
- Inside Houses. Rural Homes in Europe / Ländliches Wohnen in Europa (2001), photographs and text by Martin Rosswog, with an intr4oductions by Andreas Graf, Cologne, Könemann, ISBN 3-8290-5914-0
- Hausgeschichten (2002), Heidelberg
- Heritage (2005), Munich
- Schultenhöfe (2005), Munich
- Menschen an der Memel (2009), with a text by Ulla Lachauer
- Martin Rosswog – Milton, South Uist, Scotland (2015), Munich
- Kolchoz und Bauernhof (2017), Mechernich
