= The Smith Family, Fife, Scotland 1989 =

Photograph by Thomas Struth

The Smith Family, Fife, Scotland 1989 is a color photograph taken by the German photographer Thomas Struth, in 1989. It depicts a Scottish family, with eight members, in what appears to be their living room. It is part of a series that Struth dedicated to the depiction of families all over the world, started in 1983. It has a 10 prints edition.

== History and description ==
Struth, after creating a large photographic series dedicated to the representation of city streets, across different countries and continents, decided to start a new series where he would portray groups of several family members. He usually would present them in their home environments.

In this case, he took aim to a Scottish family, who lived in Fife, Scotland, called the Smiths. The surname isn't of Scottish but of English origin and seems to indicate a connection to England. The family depicted has eight members, of which six are seated and two are standing. The older couple seated at the left and center is, most likely, the parents, and the six youngsters, their children. The scene takes place in the corner of what it seems to be a living room. Three people are seated in the front, in maples: the elder couple and also one of the young men, at their right. One of the women sits behind and between her parents, another one is also seated, behind her father, while a man, with a moustache, sits at the third maple, at the right of his brother. One of the siblings is standing, with his hands on his pockets, behind the mother, while his sister also stands, framed by the rooms door, with her hands behind her back. Her skirt tartan pattern demonstrates her Scottish origin.

The scene was carefully staged by Struth: all the family members look directly to the camera, with serene, emotionless expressions. Their clothing is dominated by the blue color, perhaps as a subliminal reference to their Scottish condition. The Tate galleries website states: "Struth maintains a respectful distance, presenting an image of the sitters' sheer physical presence and weight. He does not offer a portrait of psychological depth but rather concentrates on appearance. In this he deliberately distances himself from much portrait photography which attempts to capture a fleeting, revealing moment or expression."

== Public collections ==
There are prints of the photograph at the Museum Ludwig, in Cologne, the Tate galleries, and at the National Galleries of Scotland, in Edinburgh.
