= Fotomuseum Winterthur =

Coordinates: 47.49602°N 8.73902°E

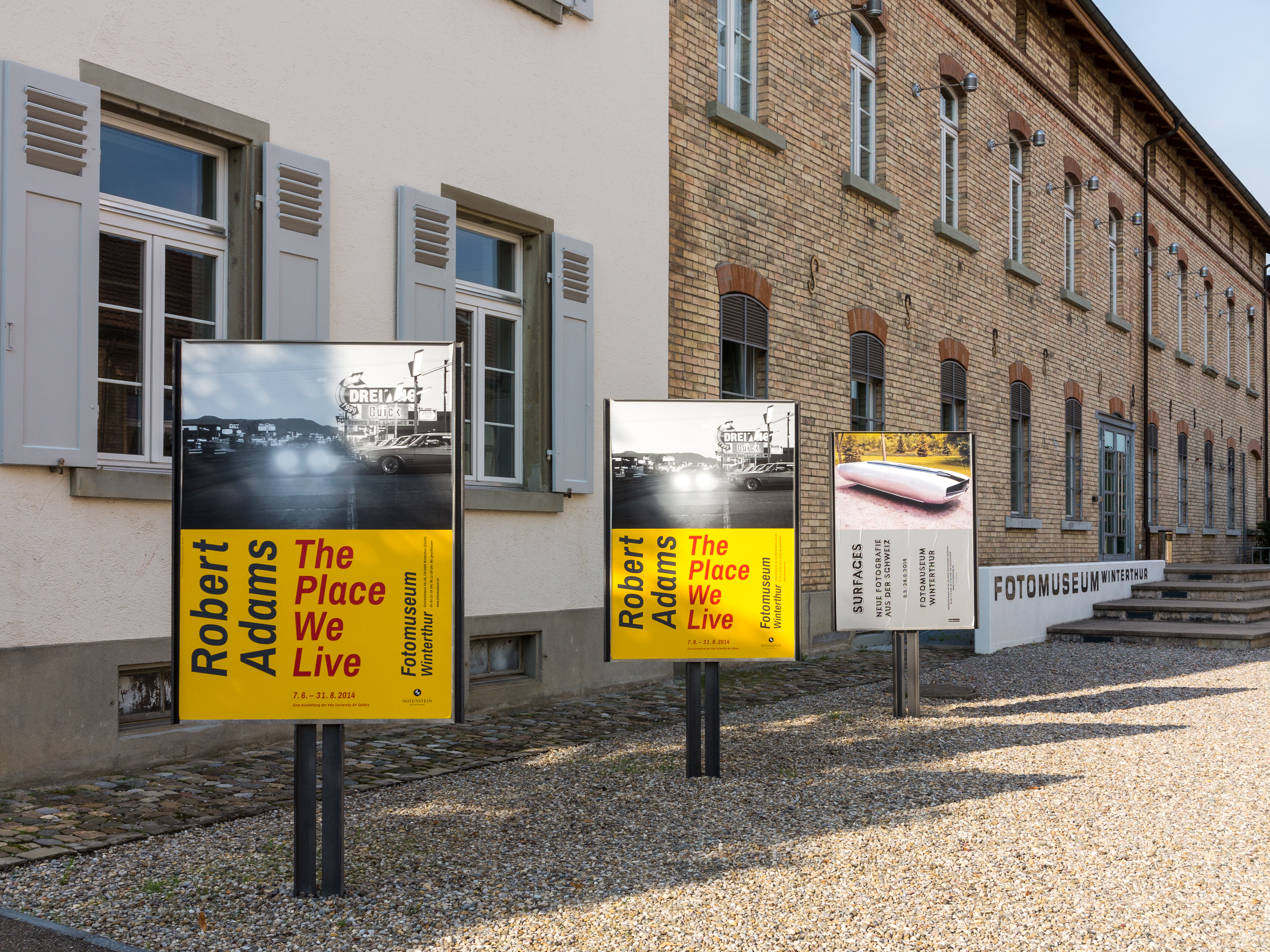
- Location: Winterthur, Switzerland
- Type: Art museum
- Founder: George Reinhart
- Website: www.fotomuseum.ch

Fotomuseum Winterthur is a museum of photography in Winterthur, Switzerland.

== History ==
The museum was founded in 1993 by photographer George Reinhart, the nephew of the wealthy Swiss art collector Oskar Reinhart. Fotomuseum's exabits are dedicated to photography as art form and document, and as a representation of reality. Fotomuseum Winterthur is an art gallery for photography by contemporary photographers and artists; a traditional museum for works by 19th and 20th century masters; and a cultural-historical, sociological museum of applied photography in the fields of industry, architecture, fashion, etc. (with exhibitions on police photography, industrial photography, dam-construction photography, medical photography etc.). These three orientations form the basis of the museum's exhibition program and accompanying publications and events.

Together with Fotostiftung Schweiz, Fotomuseum Winterthur has been running a Center of Photography since autumn of 2003, with a bistro, a library, seminar rooms, a lounge, and a shop. On the new expanded premises, and in addition to the changing exhibitions, Fotomuseum Winterthur presents changing shows of works from its collection of contemporary photography.

In June 2023, Fotomuseum Winterthur temporary closed the exhibition spaces at Grüzenstrasse 44, unrolling a redevelopment and expansion projects. The renovation phase was planned to last from June 2023 to spring 2025. Fotostiftung Schweiz remained open.

== Location ==
Together, Fotomuseum Winterthur (FMW) and Fotostiftung Schweiz (FSS) constitute the new Center of Photography in Winterthur, which occupies two buildings on opposite sides of Grüzenstrasse. The exhibition area is 1000m^{2} and the total area (including the area shared with Fotostiftung Schweiz) is 3000m^{2}. The existing premises of the FMW in Grüzenstrasse 44 accommodate the changing exhibition rooms, rooms for museum pedagogics, offices, a workshop, and storage. The new building accommodates the exhibition rooms for the FMW collection and rooms for all joint functions of the FMW and the FSS: library, seminar rooms, collection storage rooms, museum shop, and the museum bistro "George" (run by Chantal Aloui).

== The collection ==
Since the foundation of Fotomuseum Winterthur in 1993, building up a collection of contemporary photography has been a major cornerstone of the museum's activities. To date, some 4000 photographs have been purchased, donated or given on permanent loan. Every year since 2003, parts of the collection are presented in specially curated exhibitions accompanied by a series of publications (Set 1, 2, 3, 4 …). The collection can be viewed online.

The collection includes work by Nobuyoshi Araki, Vanessa Beecroft, Lewis Baltz, Daniele Buetti, Larry Clark, Hans Danuser, William Eggleston, Nicolas Faure, Hans-Peter Feldmann, Robert Frank, Nan Goldin, Paul Graham, Andreas Gursky, Roni Horn, Axel Hütte, Urs Lüthi, Boris Mikhailov, Arnold Odermatt, Gilles Peress, Liza May Post, Thomas Ruff, and Annelies Štrba.

== Group exhibitions ==
The museum is also responsible for curating group exhibitions combining photography and visual arts. Beastly/Tierisch is an example of a group exhibition, organised in 2015 and curated by Duncan Forbes. This exhibition brought about thirty international artists reworking categories of representation to examine human-animal relations, including Katja Novitskova, Xiaoxiao Xu, Hiroshi Sugimoto, Erik Kessels, Filip Gilissen, Chris Marker and Charlotte Dumas, and is accompanied by a catalogue with illustrations and essays from artists and writers like Ana Teixeira Pinto and Slavoj Žižek.

In 2015, Dr. Duncan Forbes established an exhibition programme that offers a unique perspective on photographic culture in the digital age. This innovative platform is titled SITUATIONS and has featured works by Ryan Trecartin, Constant Dullaart, Jon Rafman, Vito Acconci and Mel Bochner. Situations is successfully continued by current director Nadine Wietlisbach.

Fotomuseum holds an annual Forum for New European Photography, Plat(t)form. The forum was established to provide opportunity for forty-two emerging artists to introduce themselves to the public and art critics. The artists are judged by a double jury process, respectively nominating and selecting the winners.
