= Cologne Fine Art Award =

German art award

The Cologne Fine Art Award (German: Cologne-Fine-Art-Preis) was awarded annually as part of the art exposition ART Cologne. It was awarded by the Cologne Trade Fair Company (Kölner Messegesellschaft Köln Messe) and the Federal Association of German Art Publishers (Bundesverband Deutscher Kunstverleger e. V) . Eligible were reproducible works, such as art printing or photography.

The prize consisted of 10,000 euros and a special exposition within the ART Cologne.

== Recipients ==
- 1996 Felix Droese
- 1997 Ottmar Hörl
- 1998 Dieter Roth
- 1999 Thomas Huber
- 2000 Thomas Bayrle
- 2001 Astrid Klein
- 2002 Sigmar Polke
- 2003 Jörg Sasse
- 2004 Kupferstichkabinett Berlin
- 2005 Thomas Schütte
- 2006 Dieter Krieg
- 2007 Gert & Uwe Tobias
- 2008 Katharina Sieverding
- 2009 Georg Baselitz
- 2010 Andreas Schulze
- 2011 Günther Uecker
- 2012 Tony Cragg
- 2013 Jürgen Klauke
- 2014 Leiko Ikemura
- 2015 Candida Höfer
- 2016 Karin Kneffel
- 2017 Georg Hornemann
- 2018 Horst Antes

== See also ==
- List of European art awards

== Sources ==
- Bundesverband Deutscher Kunstverleger e. V : German
- Köln Messe : German
