= Tara Bray Smith =

American writer

Tara Bray Smith (born September 1970) is an American author. She has produced the books West of Then: A Mother, a Daughter, and a Journey Past Paradise (2004) and Betwixt (2007).

== Early years and career ==
Smith was born and grew up in Hawaii. She graduated from Dartmouth College and received a master's in non-fiction writing from Columbia University.

Her first book was a memoir, West of Then: A Mother, a Daughter, and a Journey Past Paradise, published in 2004. It tells the story of her actual and metaphorical search for her drug-addicted mother, as well as the history of her mother's family in Hawaii, rooted in the wealth and subsequent decline of 19th-century sugarcane plantations. Smith also wrote an article about Hawaii that appeared in Granta 77: What We Think of America (2002).

Smith made her debut as a young adult author with her second book, the teen novel Betwixt (2007), which became the basis for a pilot for The CW Television Network, but was never turned into a series. The proposed series, called Betwixt and then Changelings, would have starred three teenagers (Jessy Schram, Allison Miller and Josh Henderson) who find out they are "changelings" who have the ability to protect the world from evil.

== Personal life ==
Smith married the German photographer Thomas Struth in 2007. She lives in New York City and Düsseldorf.
