= Jörg Schellmann =

German furniture designer

Jörg Schellmann (born 1944) is a German furniture designer and the founder and owner of art publishing company, Schellmann Art (formerly, Edition Schellmann), Munich-New York.

== Art publishing ==
Schellmann opened his first gallery in Munich in 1969. Striving for art that is affordable to all, Schellmann began publishing prints and multiples by internationally renowned artists such as Joseph Beuys, Christo, Donald Judd, Keith Haring, Jenny Holzer, Thomas Ruff, Cindy Sherman, Andy Warhol and Christopher Wool, and others.

His projects have been exhibited at Paula Cooper Gallery, New York; Galerie Thaddaeus Ropac, Paris; the Museum of Modern Art, New York; Haus der Kunst, Munich; and the Nationalgalerie, Berlin.

== Furniture design ==
In 2008, after 35 years of producing prints, objects and installation works in editions, Schellmann began to publish and produce artists' furniture followed by his own designs. The latter are influenced by the principles of industrial and commercial objects. Simultaneously, they reflect the vocabulary of minimal and conceptual art, which has shaped Schellmann's artistic development. Schellmann's furniture designs are produced and distributed by established furniture companies, such as Moroso and e15.
