= Pantheon, Rome (photograph) =

Photograph by Thomas Struth

Pantheon, Rome is a color photograph taken by German photographer Thomas Struth, in 1990. It is part of the series Museum Photographs that he dedicated to museums and their visitors all over the world. It had a series of ten prints of large format, like most of his photographs.

== History and description ==
Struth took aim at the visitors of the Pantheon, in Rome, capturing a group of them who were standing on the large floor, under the central dome. Unlike others of his photographs this one was carefully staged. The large scale photograph shows the immensity of the space where it was taken, and also its majesty and classical beauty. The human presence of the tourists there seems dwarfed but at the same time they play an essential role in it as spectators. Struth assumed in this photograph a dialogue between past and present, in a painterly quality that doesn't appear in other photographs of the same series, recalling in particular the work of Giovanni Paolo Panini, who depicted the Pantheon in the 18th century.

Struth seems to have achieved in this case faithfully his purpose to "retrieve masterpieces from the fate of fame, to recover them from their status… to remind us that these were works which were created in a contemporary moment, by artists who had everyday lives."

== Art market ==
Three prints of this photograph are amongst those that have reached the highest prices for the author in the art market. On 12 November 2007, a print sold at Christie's New York for $1.049.000. On 26 June 2013, another version, from 1992, sold for $1.253.208 at Sotheby's London. Another version of the photograph reached $1.810.000 at Sotheby's New York, on 12 May 2015, still the highest price for one of his works.

== Public collections ==
There are prints of this photograph at the Metropolitan Museum of Art, in New York, the Museum of Modern Art, in New York, and at the Saint Louis Art Museum.
