= Bernhard Fuchs =

Austrian photographer (born 1971)

Bernhard Fuchs (born 1971 in Haslach a.d. Mühl / Upper Austria) is an Austrian photographer.

== Career ==
Bernhard Fuchs grew up in Helfenberg / Upper Austria and he studied from 1993 to 1997 at the Kunstakademie Düsseldorf, from 1994 under Bernd Becher. From 1997 to 1999 he completed a post-graduate study in a masterclass at the Hochschule für Grafik und Buchkunst Leipzig under Timm Rautert.

Fuchs lives and works in Düsseldorf.

Bernhard Fuchs received the Austrian Art Award for Media Art in the field of Artistic Photography in 2017.

== Publications ==
- Portrait Photographs. Edition Fotohof, Salzburg 2003.
- Autos. Koenig Books, London 2006.
- Roads and Paths. Koenig Books, London 2009.
- Farms. Koenig Books, London 2011.
- Woodlands. Koenig Books, London 2014
- Fathom. Koenig Books, London 2018
- Mühl. Koenig Books, London 2020
- Hayloft. Verlag der Buchhandlung Walther und Franz König, Cologne 2025

== Exhibitions ==
=== Solo exhibitions ===
- 1996: Portraits, Westfälischer Kunstverein Münster
- 2000: Portraits in Farbe, Museum Folkwang, Essen
- 2004: Portraitfotografien 1994–2001, Museum für Gegenwartskunst Siegen, Siegen
- 2006: Portraits und Autos, Landesgalerie Linz, Linz
- 2007: Autos und Portraits, Museum Ludwig, Cologne
- 2009: Straßen und Wege, Josef Albers Museum Quadrat, Bottrop
- 2010: Porträts, Kunsthalle Krems, Krems
- 2012: Portraits/Autos/Straßen und Wege, Sprengel Museum, Hannover
- 2014: Waldungen, Josef Albers Museum Quadrat, Bottrop
- 2015: Waldungen, Lentos Art Museum, Linz
- 2020: Mühl, Josef Albers Museum Quadrat, Bottrop
- 2024: Hofau, Räume für Fotografie, Siza Pavillion, Raktenstation Insel Hombroich, Neuss
- 2026: Heustock, Museum Haus Esters, Kunstmuseen Krefeld

=== Group exhibitions ===
- 1996: Manifesta 1, Chabot Museum, Rotterdam
- 2000: How you look at it, Sprengel Museum, Hannover
- 2002: today till now – zeitgenössische Fotografie aus Düsseldorf, Museum Kunst Palast, Düsseldorf
- 2006: Who is the other, Zacheta National Gallery of Art, Warsaw
- 2003: Landschaft, Kunsthalle Wilhelmshaven, Wilhelmshaven
- 2008: On the human being, Centro Andaluz de Arte Contemporáneo, Sevilla
- 2010: Der Rote Bulli, Stephen Shore und die neue Düsseldorfer Fotografie, NRW Forum, Düsseldorf
- 2012: Der Mensch und seine Objekte, Museum Folkwang, Essen
- 2015: Landscape in my mind, Bank Austria Kunstforum, Vienna
- 2020: Subjekt und Objekt.Foto Rhein Ruhr, Kunsthalle Düsseldorf, Düsseldorf
- 2022: Faces. Avedon bis Newton, Albertina, Vienna
