= Rona Pondick =

American sculptor (born 1952)

- Born: April 18, 1952 (age 74); Brooklyn, New York
- Education: Queens College (BA), Yale University School of Art (Master of Fine Art)
- Style: sculptor
- Awards: Anonymous Was a Woman; Rockefeller Foundation Fellowship; Guggenheim Fellowship
- Website: Official website

Rona Pondick (born April 18, 1952) is an American sculptor. She lives and works in New York City. Using the language of the body in her sculpture, in both a literal and a metaphorical sense, has been of interest to Pondick since the beginnings of her career in 1977. An abiding concern of hers has been the exploration of the use of different materials, a consistent motif that runs throughout her work from its beginnings to the present day.

== Early life ==
Raised in Brooklyn, New York, Rona Pondick earned her Bachelor of Fine Arts from Queens College in New York in 1974. She earned a Master of Fine Arts in 1977 from Yale University School of Art in New Haven, Connecticut, where she studied sculpture with David Von Schlegell, an American sculptor, and also studied with Richard Serra, who was a visiting artist in the program at the time.

== Artistry ==
Pondick began to exhibit in galleries and museums in the mid 1980s, and since that time her sculpture and site-specific installations have been shown in exhibitions throughout the world. Her work can be divided into two stylistic periods: early work based on fragments that reference the human body, and later work centered around the human body as part of hybrid sculptures, merged with forms from nature of flora and fauna.

=== Color ===
In 2018, Lynn Zelevansky wrote, “Color … enhances the informality and approachability of Pondick’s new work. Each object is named for the colors it contains. Her palette begins with the primary hues for photographic printing—magenta, cyan, and yellow—to which she adds green, blue, black, and white. Made from resin, acrylic, and an epoxy modeling compound…they are each partly translucent and in places almost evanescent, changing as the light changes and as viewers move around them… The addition of color and the new materials significantly alter the visual impact and emotional tenor of Pondick’s art.”

Head in Tree is an example of Pondick's hybrid sculptures; here, the artist has incorporated her life-sized head into the center of a tree, cast in matte finish stainless steel, highly polished for the back of the head.

=== Artist's technique ===
In her sculpture, Pondick has always used traditional methods such as carving, hand-modeling, mold-making, and metal casting, and at times, has used the latest in 3D computer technologies occasionally for modeling but largely for scaling. This results in a mystery in the process, and it is often hard to discern how these objects are made.

== Early work: fragments ==
Beginning with work from the early 1980s, Pondick has worked with fragments that invoke the body, including shoes, baby bottles, and teeth, “a quirky vocabulary of anatomical parts and body related objects that had some of Louise Bourgeois' oddity and near-surrealism and Philip Guston’s poignant, ambiguous symbolism.” These early provocative works have included scatological references in bodily assemblages. Her early work has been interpreted by critics in numerous ways, as a feminist critique of Freudian theories of sexuality, as an expression of infantile and juvenile desires, and as “Freudian vaudeville acts designed to make you laugh until you feel something caught in your throat.”

Her earliest sculptures are unmistakably scatalogical. From the late 1980s to early 1990s, Pondick made sculptures of beds using pillows, cloth, and wood, some with baby bottles strapped to them with rope.

== Later work ==
=== Hybrid sculptures: Animals/Flora and the Body ===
Beginning in 1998, Pondick began to make sculptures that merged parts of animals and flora with those of her own body, primarily casting them in bronze or stainless steel. Pondick merged traditional hand modeling with computer technology in order to create these hybrid sculptures, which incorporate depictions of her own head and hands. For example, in her first work in the series, Dog (1998-2001), she combined a human head and hands with the body of a dog, creating a sphinx-like figure. Other human-animal hybrids include Cat, Otter, Muskrat. Monkeys, and Ram's Head. As Pondick stated, "I use the animal form because it is recognizable and holds its scale no matter where you put it."

Dog, created between 1998 and 2001, displays the core elements of Pondick's human-animal hybrids. Here, the artist's head and hands are combined with a dog's body, cast in highly polished stainless steel.

=== Hybrid sculptures: Trees and the Body ===
In 1995, Pondick made her first sculpture of a tree using fruit scattered on the ground that incorporated human teeth. Her first tree/human hybrid sculpture incorporated the artist's miniaturized head as buds in the tree branches, using aluminum, bronze, and stainless steel. Her first tree/human hybrid sculpture was Pussy Willow Tree in 2001, commissioned by Fondation pour l’art contemporain Claudine et Jean-Marc Salomon in Annecy, France. This was followed by Cranbrook Art Museum's commission of Crimson Queen Maple in 2003, and by Head in Tree, commissioned by Sonsbeek International in 2008 and installed in the center of a pond. A sub category: “Magenta Swimming in Yellow” by Rona Pondick, 2015–17. Pigmented resin and acrylic.(Zevitas Marcus). Rona Pondick's sculptures at Zevitas Marcus gallery are both serene and nightmarish. The artist makes casts of her own head in brightly colored resins, then perches them atop tiny, atrophied bodies, or embeds them in clear cubes or plinths of contrasting color. The results are bizarre by intriguing moments suspended in time.

== Awards and grants ==
- 2020: American Academy of the Arts and Letters Purchase Award
- 2016: Anonymous Was a Woman Award
- 2000: Cultural Department of the City of Salzburg, Kunstlerhaus
- 1999: Bogliasco Foundation Fellowship
- 1996: Rockefeller Foundation Fellowship
- 1992: Guggenheim Fellowship
- 1991: Mid-Atlantic Arts Grant
- 1988: Art Matters Inc., New York State Council on the Arts (for Beds installation), Artists Space Grant
- 1985: Ludwig Vogelstein Foundation Grant
- 1977: Fannie B. Pardee Prize in Sculpture

== Solo museum exhibitions ==
This list includes material from Landau, Stoops, Van Der Zijpp, Weiermair, and Zaya.

- 2022-23: Österreichische Galerie Belvedere, Vienna, Austria
- 2017-18: Bates College Museum of Art, Lewiston, Maine
- 2017: Utah Museum of Contemporary Art, Salt Lake City, Utah
- 2010: Nassau County Museum of Art, Roslyn, New York
- 2009: Worcester Art Museum, Worcester, Massachusetts
- 2008 TR3, Ljubljana, Slovenia
- 2008 International Mozarteum Foundation (Die Internationale Stiftung Mozarteum), Salzburg, Austria
- 2004: Museum of Contemporary Art Cleveland, Cleveland, Ohio
- 2003: Cranbrook Art Museum, Bloomfield Hills, Michigan
- 2002: DeCordova Museum and Sculpture Park, Lincoln, Massachusetts
- 2002: Bologna Museum of Modern Art (MAMbo, or Museo d’Arte Moderna di Bologna), Bologna, Italy
- 2002: Groninger Museum, Groningen, Netherlands
- 1999: Rupertinum Museum für moderne und zeitgenössische Kunst, Salzburg, Austria
- 1999-97: Brooklyn Museum of Art, Brooklyn, New York
- 1995: Cincinnati Art Museum, Cincinnati, Ohio
- 1992: The Israel Museum, Jerusalem
- 1991: Beaver College of Art Gallery, Glenside, Pennsylvania
- 1989: The Institute of Contemporary Art, Boston, Massachusetts
- 1988: SculptureCenter, New York City

Aside from participating in exhibitions, she also lectured at universities and institutions such as Yale University, Princeton, Columbia, and even Bezalel, Academy of Arts & Design in Israel and Palais des Beaux Arts de Lille in France.

== International museum exhibitions ==
Pondick's work has been included in international exhibitions including the Lyon, Venice, and Johannesburg Biennales, the Whitney Biennial, and Sonsbeek.

== Museum collections ==
Pondick's work is represented in museum collections including The Allen Memorial Art Museum at Oberlin College, The Brooklyn Museum, The Carnegie Museum of Art, Centre Georges Pompidou, Cleveland Museum of Art, The DeCordova Museum and Sculpture Park, The Fogg Art Museum/Harvard Art Museums, The High Museum of Art, The Los Angeles County Museum of Art (LACMA), The Metropolitan Museum of Art, The Museum of Contemporary Art, Los Angeles, The Museum of Modern Art, The Morgan Library and Museum, Nasher Sculpture Center, The National Gallery of Art, The New Orleans Museum of Art, The New York Public Library, The Rose Art Museum, The Toledo Museum of Art, The Whitney Museum, and The Worcester Art Museum.

== Bibliography ==
- 2018 – Rona Pondick: Works 2013-2018. Marc Straus, New York; Zevitas Marcus, Los Angeles. 2018. ISBN 978-0692-14302-5.
- 2017 – Rona Pondick and Robert Feintuch: Head, Hands, Feet; Sleeping, Holding, Dreaming, Dying. Bates College Museum of Art, Lewiston, Maine. ISBN 978-0-9773570-3-1.
- 2009 – Rona Pondick: The Metamorphosis of an Object. Worcester Art Museum, Worcester, Massachusetts. 2009. ISBN 978-0-936042-20-6.
- 2008 – Rona Pondick: Works / Werke 1986-2008, New York, Salzburg. Internationale Sommerakademie fur Bildende Kunst, Salzburg; Galerie Thaddaeus Ropac, Paris / Salzburg; Sonnabend Gallery, New York. 2008. ISBN 978-3-901369-32-2.
- 2008 – Rona Pondick: Head in Tree and Other Works, 1999-2008. TR3, Ljubljana, Slovenia.
- 2004 – Rona Pondick: 1987-2001. Akira Ikeda Gallery, Taura, Japan.
- 2002 – Rona Pondick, Works 1986-2001. Sonnabend Press, New York. 2002. ISBN 0-9713411-1-7.
- 1992-1993 – Rona Pondick, Pink and Brown. The Israel Museum, Jerusalem. 1992. ISBN 965-278-114-2.
