= Thomas Ruff =

German photographer

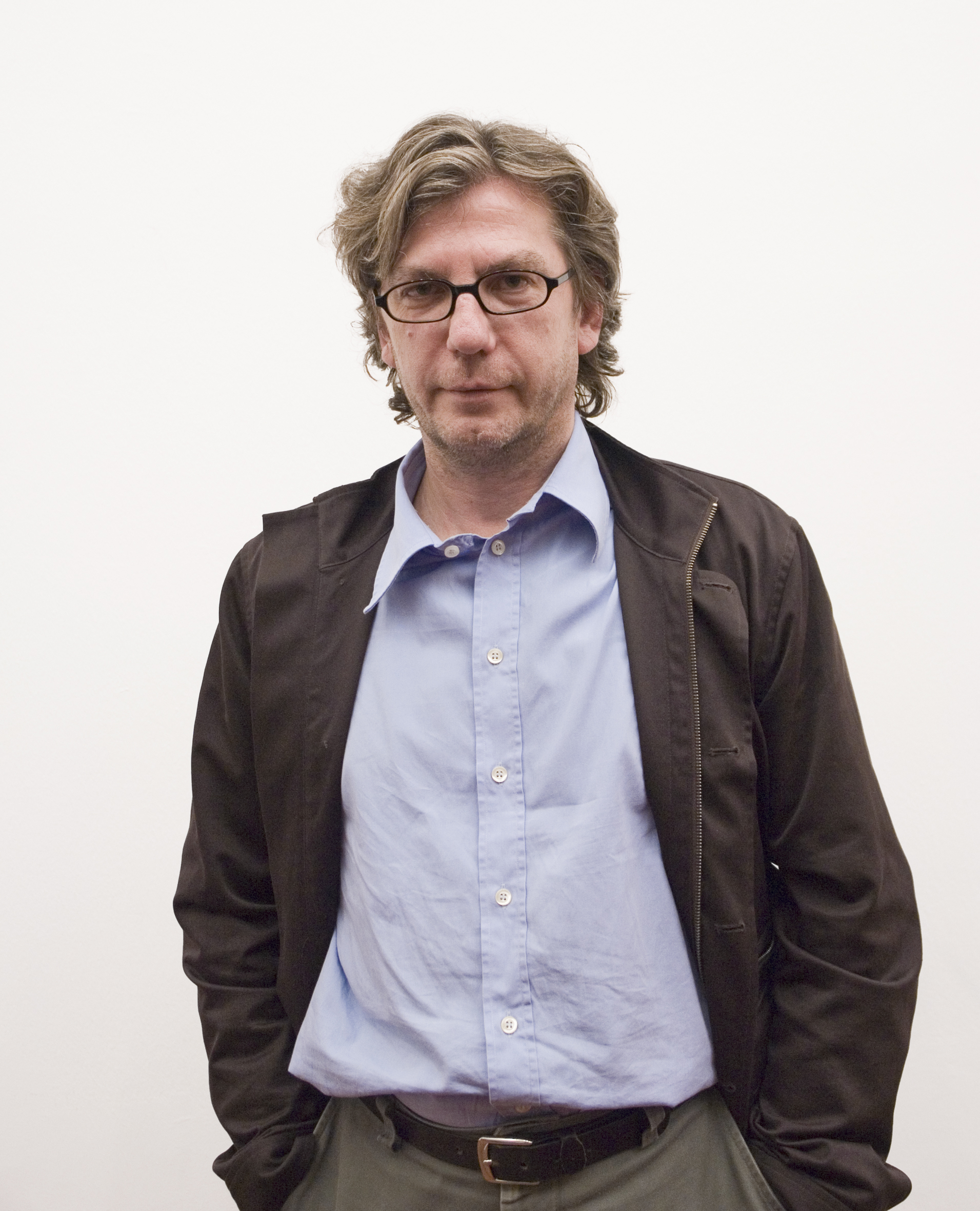
- Thomas Ruff
- Born: 10 February 1958 (age 68); Zell am Harmersbach, West Germany
- Education: Kunstakademie Düsseldorf
- Known for: Photography
- Movement: Düsseldorf School of Photography

Thomas Ruff (born 10 February 1958) is a German photographer who lives and works in Düsseldorf, Germany. He has been described as "a master of edited and reimagined images".

Ruff shares a studio on Düsseldorf's Hansaallee, with fellow German photographers Laurenz Berges, Andreas Gursky and Axel Hütte. The studio, a former municipal electricity station, includes a basement gallery.

== Early life and education ==
One of six children, Thomas Ruff was born in 1958 in Zell am Harmersbach in the Black Forest, Germany. In his youth, he was fascinated with Aldous Huxley's theories which inspired his photographs. In the summer of 1974, Ruff acquired his first camera. After attending an evening class in basic photography techniques, he started experimenting, taking shots similar to those he had seen in many amateur photography magazines.

During his studies in Düsseldorf and inspired by the lectures of Benjamin HD Buchloh, Ruff developed his method of conceptual serial photography. Ruff began photographing landscapes, but while still a student, he transitioned to the interiors of German living quarters, with typical features of the 1950s to 1970s. This was followed by similar views of buildings and portraits of friends and acquaintances from the Düsseldorf art and music scene, initially in small formats.

Ruff studied photography from 1977 to 1985 with Bernd and Hilla Becher at the Kunstakademie Düsseldorf (Düsseldorf Art Academy), where fellow students included the photographers Andreas Gursky, Candida Höfer, Thomas Struth, Angelika Wengler, and Petra Wunderlich. In 1982, he spent six months at the Cité internationale des arts in Paris. In 1993, he was a scholar at Villa Massimo in Rome.

== Work ==
Ruff commented on his influences: "My teacher Bernd Becher, showed us photographs by Stephen Shore, Joel Meyerowitz, and the new American colour photographers." He is often compared with other members of a prominent generation of European photographers that, includes Thomas Struth, Andreas Gursky, and Rineke Dijkstra. From 2000 to 2005, Ruff taught Photography at the Kunstakademie Düsseldorf.

=== Portraits ===
In his studio between 1981 and 1985, Ruff photographed 60 half-length portraits in the same manner: Passport-like images, with the upper edge of the photographs situated just above the hair, even lighting, the subject between 25 and 35 years old, taken with a 9 × 12 cm negative and, because of the use of a flash, without any motion blur. The early portraits were black-and-white and small, but Ruff soon switched to color, using solid backgrounds in different colors; from a stack of colored card stock the sitter could choose one color, which then served as the background. The resulting Portraits depict the individual persons – often Ruff's fellow students – framed as in a passport photo, typically shown with emotionless expressions, sometimes face-on, sometimes in profile, and in front of a plain background. Ruff began to experiment with large-format printing in 1986, ultimately producing photographs up to seven by five feet in size (210 × 165 cm). By 1987 Ruff had distilled the project in several ways, settling on an almost exclusive use of the full frontal view and enlarging the finished work to monumental proportions. Art critic Charles Hagen, writing for The New York Times, commented: "Blown up to wall-size proportions, the photographs looked like gigantic banners of Eastern European dictators."

Because he found the effect of the colors too dominant in these, Ruff chose a light and neutral background for the portraits he made between 1986 and 1991. In a discussion with Philip Pocock, Ruff mentions a connection between his portraits and the police observation methods in Germany in the 1970s during the German Autumn. Indeed, while experimenting with composite faces in 1992, Ruff came across the Minolta Montage Unit, a picture generating machine, used by the German police in the 1970s to generate composite portraits. Through a combination of mirrors, four portraits, fed into the machine, produce one composite picture. Ruff started out reconstructing faces but soon found it more interesting to construct artificial faces, which often combine features of men and women, that do not, but could conceivably, exist in reality; this resulted in his Anderes Porträt series (1994–1995).

Ruff intended that large groups of the approximately eight-by-ten-inch color portraits would be hung together, so to add variety he photographed each person against a colored backdrop.

=== Häuser ===
The series Häuser was created between 1987 and 1991. Ruff's building portraits are likewise serial, and have been edited digitally to remove obstructing details – a typifying method, which gives the images an exemplary character. Of these Ruff notes, "This type of building represents more or less the ideology and economy in the West German republic in the past thirty years." Architects Herzog & de Meuron soon became aware of this form of architecture photography and invited Ruff to participate in their entry for the Venice Biennale of Architecture in 1991 with a photograph of their building for Ricola.

In 1999, Ruff made a series of digitally altered photographs of modernist architecture by Mies van der Rohe. The series l.m.v.d.r. – the initials of the architect – began as a commission offered to Ruff in 1999–2000 in connection with the renovation of Haus Lange and Haus Esters in Krefeld, Germany. Having worked with architectural subject matter since the mid-1980s, Ruff was enlisted to photograph the Krefeld buildings as well as the Barcelona Pavilion and the Villa Tugendhat in Brno.

=== Sterne, Nacht and Zeitungsfotos ===
These first series were followed in 1989 by images of the night sky, Sterne, which were not based on photographs by Ruff, but rather on archived images ('Catalogue of the Southern Sky', including 600 negatives) he had acquired of the European Southern Observatory in the Andes in Chile. These photographs of the stars, taken with a specially designed telescopic lens, are described and catalogued with the precise time of day and exact geographic position. Ruff selected specific details from these photographs, which he enlarged to a uniform grand scale. From 1992 to 1995, during the first Gulf War, Ruff produced his Nacht series (1992–1996), night images of exteriors and buildings using the same night vision infrared technology developed for use, both military and in broadcast television. From 1994 to 1996, these were followed by Stereoscopy images, and another series in the 1990s, Zeitungsfotos, consisted of newspaper clippings enlarged without their original subtitles.

=== Nudes ===
In 2003, Ruff published a photographic collection of "Nudes" with a text by the French author Michel Houellebecq. Ruff's images here are based on Internet pornography, which was digitally processed and obscured without any camera or traditional photographic device. In 2009, Aperture Foundation published JPEGs, a large-scale book dedicated exclusively to his monumental series of pixelated enlargements of internet-culled images in the compressed JPEG format.

His Substrat series (2002–2003), based on images from Japanese manga and anime cartoons, continued this exploration of digitally altered Web-based pictures. However, he alters and manipulates the source material such that the work becomes an abstraction of forms and colors with no visual memory of the original source material. On 7 February 2011, one of his Nudes pictures appeared on the cover of New York Magazine.

=== Zycles, Cassini, and ma.r.s. ===
The artist's series Zycles and Cassini draw from scientific sources. Zycles are based on 3D renderings of mathematical curves that were inspired by Ruff's encounter with copperplate engravings found in 19th-century books on electromagnetism. Ruff translated these images via a 3D computer-modeling program, but instead of his usual flattening, he gave volume to 2D. The results are large inkjet prints on canvas of colored lines and swirls. The Cassini works are based on photographic captures of Saturn taken by NASA. Ruff has transformed the raw black and white prints with interjections of saturated color. In the ma.r.s. series, also sourced from the NASA website, Ruff has transformed the raw black and white fragmentary representations of the planet Mars with interjections of saturated color. He also digitally changed the perspective. In addition to the large C-prints, he has experimented for the first time with 3D image-making.

=== Photograms ===
With Photograms, Ruff engages with the photogram, the cameraless technique advanced by Man Ray, László Moholy-Nagy, and others in the early twentieth century. The photograms series depict abstract shapes, lines, and spirals in seemingly random formations with varying degrees of transparency and illumination. The objects and the light in Ruff's Photograms derive from a virtual darkroom built by a custom-made software program.

=== press++ ===
Exhibited for the first time at Sprüth Magers's Berlin gallery in 2017, the press++ series is based on images that have been published in American newspapers and magazines from the 1920s to 1970s and that Ruff found on eBay. To produce these works, Ruff scans the front and back of each photograph and combines them digitally, considering the original image and crops, touch-ups, date stamps, scribbles, and smudges.

After a number of collaborations with Swiss architects Herzog & de Meuron, the firm designed a studio building for Ruff and Gursky in Düsseldorf.

=== d.o.pe ===
First exhibited at David Zwirner's 533 West 19th Street location in New York, the d.o.pe series takes its title from Aldous Huxley's autobiographical work The Doors of Perception, which explores the author's experience using mescaline. For this series, Ruff prints fractal patterns created with a specialized software program onto industrial carpets, extending the artist's interest in the limits of human perception and the creation of digital imagery that is at once natural and artificial. The works reference artists such as Hieronymus Bosch and Matthias Grünewald and Ruff's own formative adolescent experiences in the Black Forest.

== Art market ==
The highest price reached by one of his photographs was when Jpeg pt01 sold for £197,000 ($239,990) at Christie's London, on 8 March 2017.

== Publications ==
- 1979 to the Present. Distributed Art Publishers, 2003. Edited by Matthias Winzen. ISBN 978-1-891024-72-6. With essays by Ute Eskildsen, Valeria Liebermann and Per Boym. A retrospective.
- Machines. Hatje Cantz, 2004. ISBN 978-3-7757-1423-5. With essays by Caroline Flosdorff and Michael Stüber.
- M.D.P.N. Milan: Charta, 2006. Edited by Fabrizio Tramontano. ISBN 978-88-8158-558-8. With essays in English and Italian by Giovanni Leoni, Giancarlo Cosenza and Luigi Cosenza and an introduction by Giancarlo Cosenza.
- Thomas Ruff. Skira, 2009. ISBN 978-88-6130-297-6. A retrospective.
- JPEGs. New York: Aperture, 2009. ISBN 978-1-59711-093-8. With an essay by Bennet Simpson.
- Surfaces, Depths. Verlag für moderne Kunst Nürnberg, 2009. Edited by Gerald Matt. ISBN 978-3-941185-50-0. With texts by Catherine Hug, Douglas Fogle, Kurt W. Forster, and Gerald Matt, and an interview by Matt with Ruff.
- Schwarzwald Landschaft. Verlag für moderne Kunst Nürnberg, 2010. ISBN 978-3-941185-51-7. Text by Jochen Ludwig and Christiane Grathwohl-Scheffel.
- Stellar Landscapes. Heidelberg, Germany: Kehrer, 2012. ISBN 978-3-86828-261-0.
- Works 1979–2011. Munich: Schirmer/Mosel, 2012. ISBN 978-3-8296-0585-4. With texts by Okwui Enwezor, Thomas Weski, and Valeria Liebermann. Exhibition catalogue.
- Sterne. London: Morel Books, 2013. ISBN 978-1-907071-27-0. Edition of 1000 copies.
- Series. La Fábrica, 2014. ISBN 978-84-15691-45-7. Text by José Manuel Costa and an interview by Valeria Liebermann with Ruff.
- Photograms and Negatives. New York: Rizzoli International, 2015. ISBN 978-0-8478-4568-2. Exhibition catalogue.
- Editions 1988–2014. Hatje Cantz, 2015. Edited by Jörg Schellmann. ISBN 978-3-7757-3859-0. With an introduction by Thomas Weski.

== Film about Ruff ==
- Goertz, Ralph; Institut für Kunstdokumentation und Szenografie (2014), Thomas Ruff : photographs 1979–2011 (in German), [Düsseldorf]: Institut für Kunstdokumentation und Szenografie, ISBN 978-3-86335-693-4, OCLC 938350966 – 50-minute documentary by Ralph Goertz. In German with English subtitles.

== Collections ==
Ruff's work is held, among others, in the following public collection:

- Metropolitan Museum of Art, New York City: 5 prints (As of December 2020)
- Tate, UK: 5 prints (As of December 2020)
