= Düsseldorf school of photography =

Group of 20th- and 21st-century photographers

The Düsseldorf school of photography (German: Düsseldorfer Photoschule, Düsseldorfer Fotoschule), also known as the Becher school (German: Becher-Schule), is a loose grouping of German photographers who emerged from the photography class taught by Bernd and Hilla Becher at the Kunstakademie Düsseldorf from 1976 onward, and whose work is characterized by large-format prints, serial typologies, and a detached documentary style.

== Origins ==
Hilla Becher helped set up the Kunstakademie Düsseldorf's first photography workshop in the late 1950s, and from 1959 onward she and Bernd Becher jointly documented industrial architecture in large-format black and white. Their inclusion in the 1975 exhibition New Topographics: Photographs of a Man-Altered Landscape, curated by William Jenkins at the International Museum of Photography at George Eastman House in Rochester, New York, helped introduce their working method to an international audience. In 1976 Bernd Becher was appointed professor of photography at the Academy and a dedicated photography class was established; the joint teaching he and Hilla undertook there marks the founding of the school. Bernd Becher held the chair until 1996. Photography teaching at the Academy was subsequently continued by former students of the class, including Thomas Ruff and Andreas Gursky, and the American conceptual artist Christopher Williams was appointed professor of photography in 2008.

The term "Becher School" originated with a 1988 exhibition of work by former students of the class at Galerie Johnen & Schöttle in Cologne, after which the term circulated particularly within the art market. Hilla Becher herself disliked the label and said in a 2013 interview that she had never used it.

== Characteristics and style ==
The Bechers' teaching drew on a disciplined approach they had developed in their own practice: large-format black and white photography of industrial structures, typically presented in grids or groupings that invited comparison between variations of the same building type. Their own subjects included cooling towers, blast furnaces, pithead winding gear, coal bunkers, grain silos, and the half-timbered houses of the Siegen region, which they described as "anonymous sculptures", treating the vernacular architecture of heavy industry as worthy of the same sustained attention as fine art. Although critics commonly describe the resulting groupings as typologies, Hilla Becher resisted the term, saying that she and Bernd had thought of the photographed structures less as types than as objects that recurred in different countries. Bernd Becher held that a photograph should be free of mood or narrative and instead register its subject with plain directness, an effect he regarded as among the harder things to achieve with a camera.

Critics have placed the Bechers' approach in the lineage of the Neue Sachlichkeit movement of the 1920s, and in particular of August Sander's sociological portraiture and Karl Blossfeldt's magnified studies of plant forms, both of which paired systematic comparison with an unsentimental documentary register. While students of the class shared this commitment to a documentary register, they pursued strikingly different subjects: Andreas Gursky turned venues of late capitalism such as stock exchanges, racetracks, and supermarket interiors into large panoramic tableaux; Axel Hutte pushed landscape photography toward near-abstraction through pale skies and even light; and Candida Höfer concentrated on the interiors of grand public institutions including libraries and cathedrals.

== Notable photographers ==
Among the photographers who studied in the Becher class and went on to international careers are Andreas Gursky, Candida Höfer, Thomas Ruff, Thomas Struth, Axel Hutte, Petra Wunderlich, Simone Nieweg, and Tata Ronkholz. The 2017 Städel Museum survey Photographs Become Pictures: The Becher Class presented work by Volker Dohne, Gursky, Höfer, Hutte, Ronkholz, Ruff, Jörg Sasse, Struth, and Wunderlich alongside the Bechers themselves.

== Influence and legacy ==
The independent curator and writer Charlotte Cotton has described the dominant photographic style since the 1990s as a "deadpan aesthetic", a dispassionate and finely detailed mode that overlaps with the approach developed at Düsseldorf.

== Exhibitions ==
- Dusseldorf Photography: Bernd & Hilla Becher and Beyond, Ben Brown Fine Arts, London, autumn 2015. A survey of the Bechers alongside former students including Candida Höfer, Andreas Gursky, Axel Hutte, Thomas Ruff, Elger Esser, and Thomas Struth, as well as the former Kunstakademie sculpture student Thomas Demand.
- Photographs Become Pictures: The Becher Class, Städel Museum, Frankfurt, 27 April to 13 August 2017. A comprehensive survey of around 200 photographs examining the influence of Bernd and Hilla Becher on their students at the Kunstakademie Dusseldorf, curated by Martin Engler.
- Bernd, Hilla and the Others: Photography from Dusseldorf, Huis Marseille, Amsterdam, 9 March to 3 June 2018. A survey of the school's first and second generations, curated in cooperation with Barbara Hofmann-Johnson of the Museum für Photographie, Braunschweig.
- The Düsseldorf School of Photography, Fondazione MAST, Bologna, 23 April to 27 September 2026. A companion exhibition to the Becher retrospective History of a Method, drawn from the MAST Collection, with work by Andreas Gursky, Thomas Struth, Thomas Ruff, and Tata Ronkholz.
