= Axel Hütte =

German photographer

Alex Hütte
- Born: 1951 (age 74–75); Essen, West Germany
- Known for: photography
- Movement: Düsseldorf School of Photography

Axel Hütte (born 1951) is a German photographer. He is considered one of main representatives of the Düsseldorf School of Photography.

== Biography ==
Hütte was born in the German city of Essen in 1951. He studied photography in Düsseldorf Art Academy from 1973 to 1981, attending Bernd Becher’s class. He received a scholarship from the German Academic Exchange Service to study in London and in 1985 a scholarship to study at the German Study Center in the Palazzo Barbarigo della Terrazza in Venice. From 1986 to 1988 he was the recipient of a Karl Schmidt-Rottluff scholarship.

In 1993, Hütte received the Hermann Claasen Prize for Creative Photography. Since then, he has been working as a freelance photographer.

Hütte lives and works in Düsseldorf. His studio is located in the former power station on Hansaallee in Düsseldorf-Oberkassel, where the photographers Andreas Gursky, Thomas Ruff and Laurenz Berges also have their studios since the early 1980s. The property was remodeled by Swiss architects Herzog & de Meuron in 2001, and once again, in 2010–2011.

== Work ==
Hütte, in addition to his documentary-style work, since the late 1990s, has also turned his interest to subjects that seem more painterly, like landscapes and cityscapes. His photographs of architecture, such as bridges, stairwells, corridors or subway stations, show seemingly banal things, sometimes only fragments, in a disciplined form but without apparently great sensorial appeal.

His works is a reflection on the mimetic possibilities of photography. The main purpose of his photographic work is not the exact nature of reality using the camera, but the reflection of the relationship between images.

He has been considered the equivalent to a "landscape painter" among contemporary photographers, and has a lot of experience with night shots.

Hütte described his works in the comprehensive exhibition held in the Kunsthalle Krems: “Imperial, Majestic and Magical [the name of the exhibition] refers to concrete and at the same time enigmatic visual worlds that are familiar to us but appear strange in the picture. They should reactivate memories or dreams in the viewer, i.e. address the implicit memory, and make the world experienceable as real and at the same time as imagination.”

== Publications ==
- As Dark As Light. Schirmer/Mosel Verlag. 2001. ISBN 978-388-814929-0.
- Terra Incognita. Reina Sofia. 2004. ISBN 978-848-026217-0.
- Axel Hütte speaks with Stephan Berg. La Fábrica Editorial and Fundación Telefónica. 2009. ISBN 978-849-249889-5.
- Towards the Wood. Schirmer/Mosel Verlag. 2011. ISBN 978-382-960515-1.

== Exhibitions ==
=== Solo ===
- 1997: Theorea. Fotomuseum Winterthur.
- 1997: Fecit. Kunstverein Hannover.
- 2004: Terra Incognita. Museo Nacional Centro de Arte Reina Sofia.
- 2011: Emerald Woods. Dirimart Gallery, Istanbul.
- 2013: Palacio Municipal de Exposiciones Kiosco Alfonso, A Coruña, Spain.
- 2014: Fantasmi E Realtà. Bevilacqua La Masa Foundation, Venice.
- 2014: Paisaje Escindido. Museo San Telmo, San Sebastián, Spain.
- 2015: Shadows of Lights. Galería Helga de Alvear, Madrid.
- 2017: Imperial – Majestic – Magical. Kunsthalle Krems, Germany.
- 2017: Night and Day. Museum Kunstpalast Düsseldorf, Germany.
- 2019: Kosmos Tropical. Galerie Daniel Marzona, Berlin, Germany.

=== Group ===
- 2014: 40|10 Bilderwechsel. Frieder Burda Museum. Baden – Baden, Germany.
- 2016: Strange and Familiar: Britain as Revealed by International Photographers. Curated by Martin Parr. Barbican Art Gallery, London, 2016; Manchester Art Gallery, Manchester.
- 2017: Photographs Become Pictures. The Becher Class. Städel Museum. Frankfurt am Main, Germany.

== Public collections ==
Hütte's work is held, among others, in the following public collections:

- Museum Folkwang, Essen
- Museo Nacional Centro de Arte Reina Sofía, Madrid
