= Thomas Struth =

German photographer (born 1954)

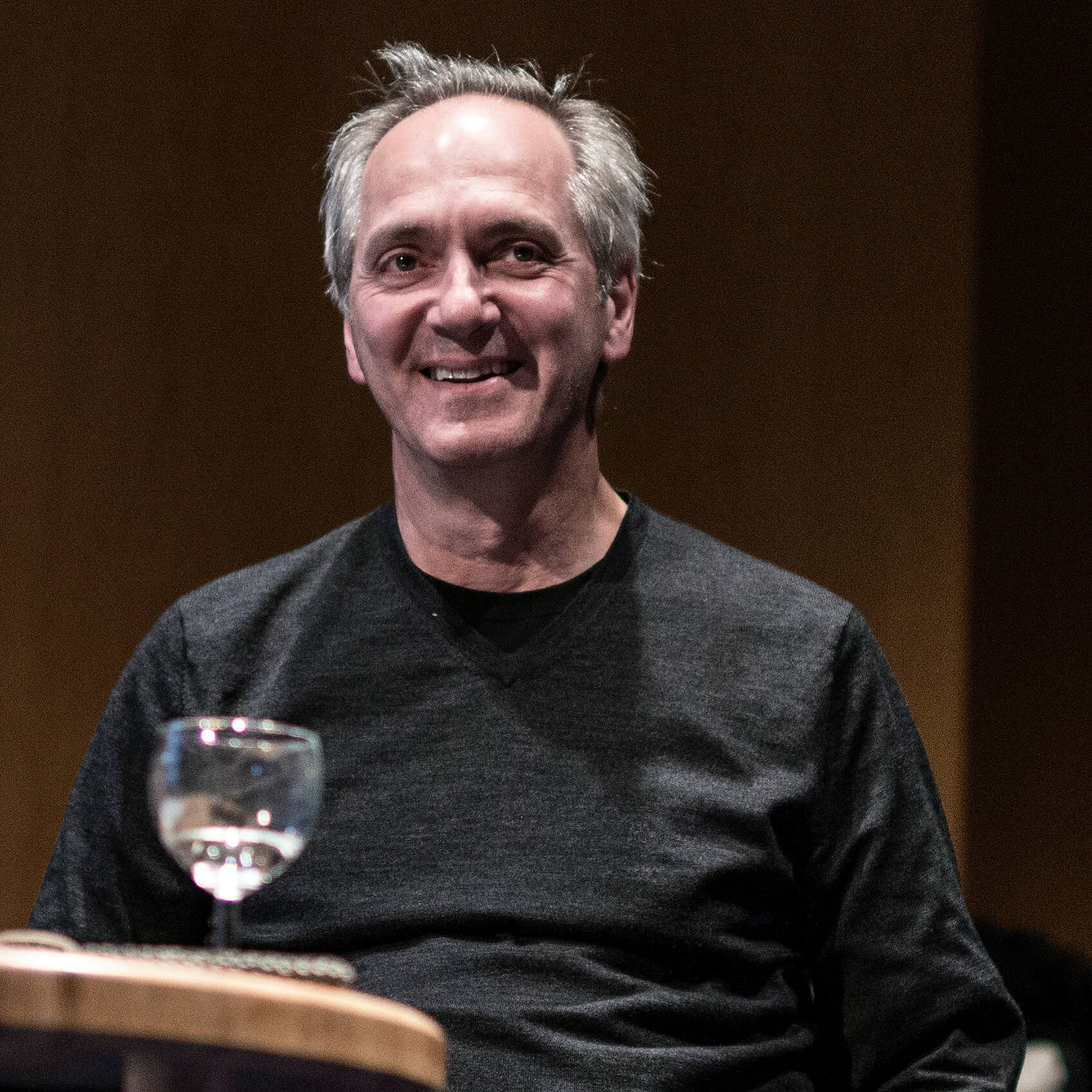
- Struth in 2016
- Born: 11 October 1954 (age 71); Geldern, North Rhine-Westphalia, West Germany
- Education: Kunstakademie Düsseldorf, Düsseldorf
- Known for: Photography
- Notable work: Museum Photographs (1989–2002)
- Movement: Düsseldorf School of Photography
- Website: https://thomas-struth.com/

Thomas Struth (born 11 October 1954) is a German photographer who is best known for his Museum Photographs series, black and white photographs of the streets of Düsseldorf and New York taken in the 1970s, and his family photographs series. Struth lives and works between Berlin and New York.

== Early life and education ==
Born on 11 October 1954 to ceramic potter Gisela Struth and bank director Heinrich Struth in Geldern, Germany, Struth trained at the Düsseldorf Academy from 1973 until 1980 where he initially studied painting under Peter Kleemann and, from 1974, Gerhard Richter. Increasingly drawn to photography and with Richter's support, Struth, along with Candida Höfer, Axel Hütte, and Tata Ronkholz, joined the first year of the new photography class run by Bernd and Hilla Becher, in 1976.

== Work ==
In 1976, as part of a student exhibition at the Academy, Struth first showed a grid composed of 49 photographs taken from a centralized perspective on Düsseldorf's deserted streets, each of them obeying a strict logic of central symmetry. The compositions are simple and the photographs are neither staged nor digitally manipulated in post-production. Strong contrasts of light and shade are also avoided, Struth preferring the greyish, uninflected light of early morning. This serves to enhance the neutral treatment of the scenes.

In 1977, Struth and Hütte travelled to England for two months, and teamed up to photograph different aspects of housing in the urban context of East London. In 1978 Struth was the first artist in residence at P.S. 1 Studios, Long Island City. In 1979 Struth travelled to Paris to visit Thomas Schütte, a fellow student at the Kunstakademie, and continued his photographs of cityscapes. He went on to produce similar series in Rome (1984), Edinburgh (1985), Tokyo (1986), and elsewhere. These early works largely consisted of black-and-white shots of streets. Skyscrapers were another feature of his work, with many of his photographs attempting to show the relationship people have with their modern-day environment.

In the mid-1980s, Struth added a new dimension to his work when he started to produce family portraits, some of which are in colour and others in black and white. This was after a meeting with psychoanalyst Ingo Hartmann. As a result, these works attempt to show the underlying social dynamics within a seemingly still photograph.

In 1989, Struth began work on his best-known cycle, Museum Photographs, devoted to the visitors to some of the world's great museums and buildings, including The Art Institute of Chicago, the Musée du Louvre in Paris, the Accademia in Venice, and the Pantheon in Rome. Expanding the practice after living in Naples and Rome at the end of the 1980s, he also photographed visitors of churches. From 1998 on, Struth expanded the series with images shot on sites of powerful secular significance (including Times Square and the Yosemite National Park). His pictures of the Pergamon Museum in Berlin, taken between 1996 and 2001, comprise the first series of Museum Photographs dedicated entirely to a single museum with architectural and sculptural works from classical antiquity, including the famous Pergamon Altar and the market gate of Milet. After several unsuccessful attempts to make works based on candid shots of visitors at the Pergamon Museum, in 2001 he decided to orchestrate the positioning of participants in a series of photos. Struth's "Museo del Prado" series from 2005, composed of five photographs taken over the course of one week, all shot from slightly different angles, of visitors flocking around Velázquez's Las Meninas. Also in 2005, he began producing a second series consisting of close-ups of spectators of a single work at the Hermitage in St. Petersburg. Here the spectators are the central object of the photograph, while the artwork itself remains outside the frame. By including in his photographs people who are looking at art, "Struth makes viewers ... aware of their own active participation in the completion of the work's meaning, not as passive consumers but as re-interpreters of the past."

Basing himself in Düsseldorf, Struth's profile continued to expand in the 1990s. Between 1998 and 2006, Struth began scouring the earth for jungle settings in Japan, Australia, China, America and Europe; his first eight large-format Pictures from Paradise were created in 1998 in the Daintree Rainforest in Australia. Between 1995 and 2003, he produced a series of photographs featuring groups of people gathered at emblematic locations, whether as tourists or as pilgrims.

Again created throughout Asia, Europe and the Americas, mural-sized colour photographs of 2010 that are up to 4 metres long record the structural intricacy of remote techno-industrial and scientific research spaces, such as physics institutes, pharmaceutical plants, space stations, dockyards, nuclear facilities and other edifices of technological production. In 2014, Struth presented a series of pictures in which he again penetrates key places of human imagination to scrutinize the landscape of enterprise, invention and digital engineering. Taking an archetypal site for the creation of cultural dreams and imagination, one group of pictures depicts panoramic views of Disneyland and Disney California Adventure (devoid of crowds), partly inspired by Katja Eichinger’s 2008 article in the Frankfurter Allgemeine Zeitung about the altered perspective and reading of the theme parks since their beginnings in the 1950s. For his most recent work, Animals (2017–2018), Struth worked at the Leibniz Institute for Zoo and Wildlife Research (IZW) in Berlin, following researchers in biology and veterinary medicine in their study of wildlife diversity and conservation.

Meanwhile, Struth continues to add to his collection of family portraits. In 2002, Gerhard Richter asked Struth to make a family portrait for an article on Richter's work in the New York Times Magazine. In 2011, he was commissioned by the National Portrait Gallery to make a double portrait of Queen Elizabeth II and the Duke of Edinburgh.

From 1993 to 1996, Struth was the first Professor of Photography at the Staatliche Hochschule für Gestaltung in Karlsruhe, Germany. In 2007, he was an artist in residence at the Atlantic Center for the Arts. Between 2010 and 2011, he served as Humanitas Visiting Professor in Contemporary Art at Oxford University.

== Exhibitions ==
Struth's work has been widely shown in solo and group exhibitions, among them the 44th Venice Biennale (1990) and Documenta IX (1992) at Kassel. His first solo show outside of Germany took place at Fruitmarket Gallery, Edinburgh in 1987. In 1988, Struth exhibited in the group show "Another Objectivity", organized by the Institute of Contemporary Arts, London, which sought to define a current of research born in Germany in the wake of the Bechers’ work. Struth later had his first solo exhibition in the U.S. at The Renaissance Society in Chicago in 1990. Following the anthological exhibitions held in 2002 at the Dallas Museum of Art and the MOCA in Los Angeles, in 2003 his work was presented at the Great Hall of the Metropolitan Museum, with the screening of the video One Hour Video Portraits of portraits on which Struth had been working since 1996. The centre of the exhibition was the Museum series, which featured seemingly ordinary shots of people entering churches, museums and other public places. In 2007, he became the first contemporary artist ever to be exhibited at the Museo del Prado, Madrid, among the permanent collection of old masters.

In 2010, a European retrospective of his work, "Thomas Struth: Photographs 1978–2010" was held at Kunsthaus Zürich, later traveling to Kunstsammlung Nordrhein-Westfalen K20, Düsseldorf; Whitechapel Gallery, London; and Museu Serralves, Porto.

From September 30, 2014–February 16, 2015, the Metropolitan Museum of Art exhibited Thomas Struth: Photographs.

From October 2, 2019-January 19, 2020 the Guggenheim Bilbao exhibited Thomas Struth displaying works from 4 decades of Struth’s career.

== Recognition ==
- 1992: Werner Mantz Prize for Photography, the Netherlands
- 1997: Spectrum International Photography Prize of Lower Saxony
- 2013–2014: Honorary residency at the Villa Aurora in Los Angeles, CA
- 2014: Honorary fellowship awarded by the Royal Institute of British Architects (RIBA).
- 2016: Centenary Medal and with it an Honorary Fellowship of the Royal Photographic Society.
- 2024: Prémio Europeu Helena Vaz da Silva, National Culture Centre, Lisbon

== Art market ==
Struth usually works in editions of ten prints. On 12 November 2007, his work Pantheon, Rome (1990) was sold to David Zwirner at Christie's New York, for $1,049,000. On 26 June 2013, a version of Pantheon, Rome, executed in 1992, sold for $1,253,208 at Sotheby's London. Another version of the same photograph sold by $1,810,000 at Sotheby's New York, on 12 May 2015, currently the highest price reached by one of his works.

== Personal life ==
In a 2004 interview with Die Zeit, Struth publicly criticized art collector Friedrich Christian Flick for not contributing to the Foundation Remembrance, Responsibility and Future, a government fund for slave laborers and their families; Flick later made a payment of 5 million euros.

In 2007, Struth married author Tara Bray Smith in New York.

== Publications ==
- Unbewusste Orte / Unconscious Places, Bern 1987
- Museum Photographs, Munich 1993
- Strangers and Friends, 1994
- Stefen Gronert und Christoph Schreier: Thomas Struth. Straßen. Fotografie 1976 bis 1995, Kunstmuseum Bonn, Cologne, 1995.
- Portraits, Munich 1997
- Still, Munich 1998
- Struth, Munich 2000
- Thomas Struth – My Portrait, 2000
- Löwenzahnzimmer, Munich 2001
- New Pictures from Paradise, Munich 2002
- Photographien 1977–2002, Munich 2002
- Pergamon Museum, Munich 2004
- Museum Photographs, Munich 2005
- Les Museum Photographs de Thomas Struth. Une mise en abyme, Paris/Munich 2005
- Thomas Struth – Photographs 1978–2010, Schirmer/Mosel, 2010, ISBN 978-3-8296-0465-9
- Thomas Struth: Unconscious Places (with an essay by Richard Sennett), Schirmer/Mosel 2012

== Public collections ==
Struth's work is held, among others, in the following public collections:

- Akron Art Museum
- Art Institute of Chicago
- Canadian Centre for Architecture, Montreal
- Castle of Rivoli, Rivoli, Turin
- Cleveland Museum of Art
- Hirshhorn Museum and Sculpture Garden, Washington, D.C.
- International Center of Photography, New York
- Kunsthaus Zürich
- Los Angeles County Museum of Art
- Metropolitan Museum of Art
- Modern Art Museum of Fort Worth
- Museo Nacional Centro de Arte Reina Sofía, Madrid
- Museum of Contemporary Art, Los Angeles
- Museum of Fine Arts, Houston
- Museum of Modern Art, New York
- Museum Ludwig, Cologne
- National Gallery of Art, Washington, D.C.
- National Museum of Contemporary Art, Athens
- Pinakothek der Moderne, Munich
- Saint Louis Art Museum
- San Francisco Museum of Modern Art
- Solomon R. Guggenheim Museum, New York
- Tate Modern
