= Bernd and Hilla Becher =

German photographic duo

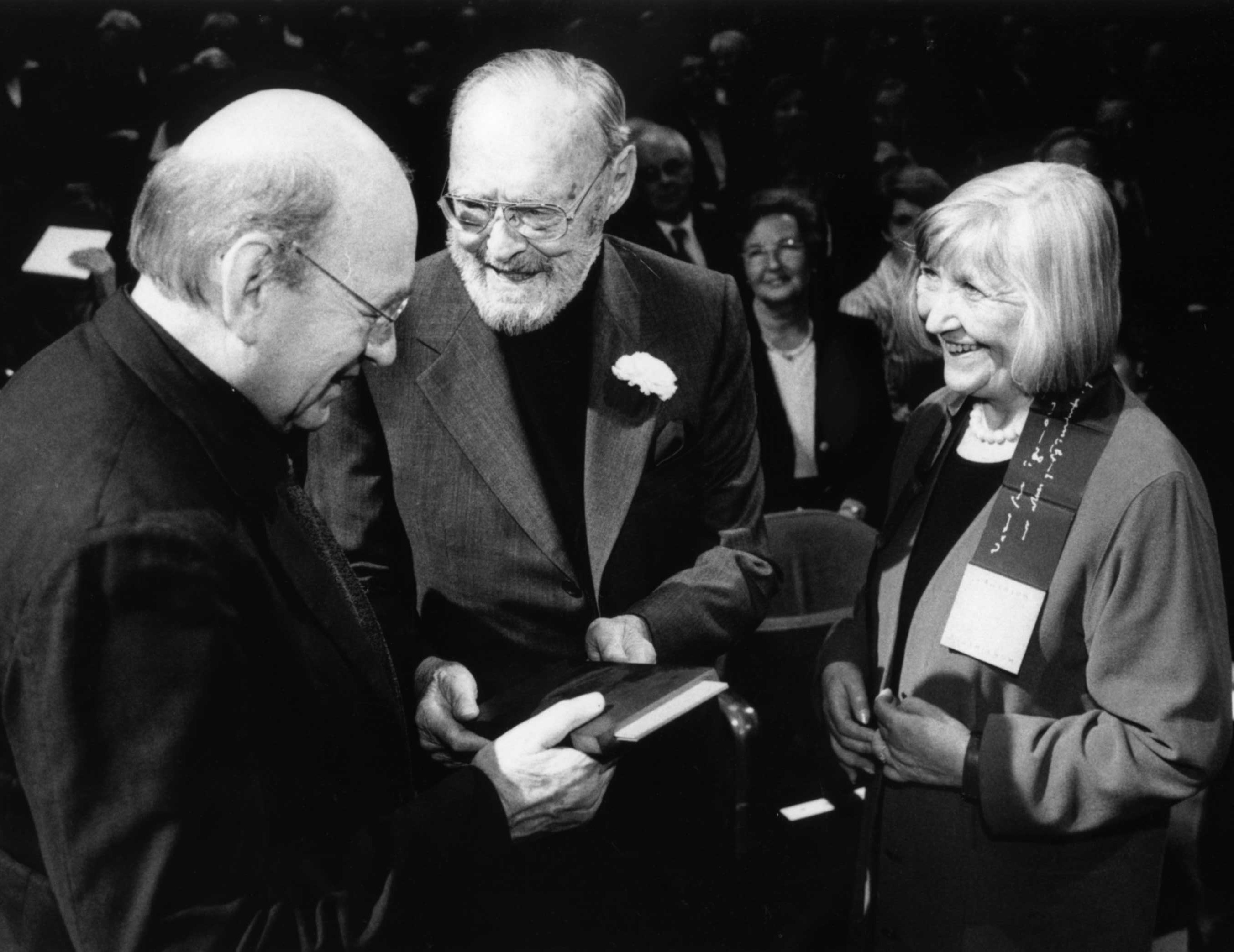
Bernd (left) and Hilla Becher (Erasmus Prize 2002)

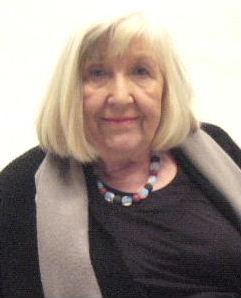
Hilla Becher (2011)

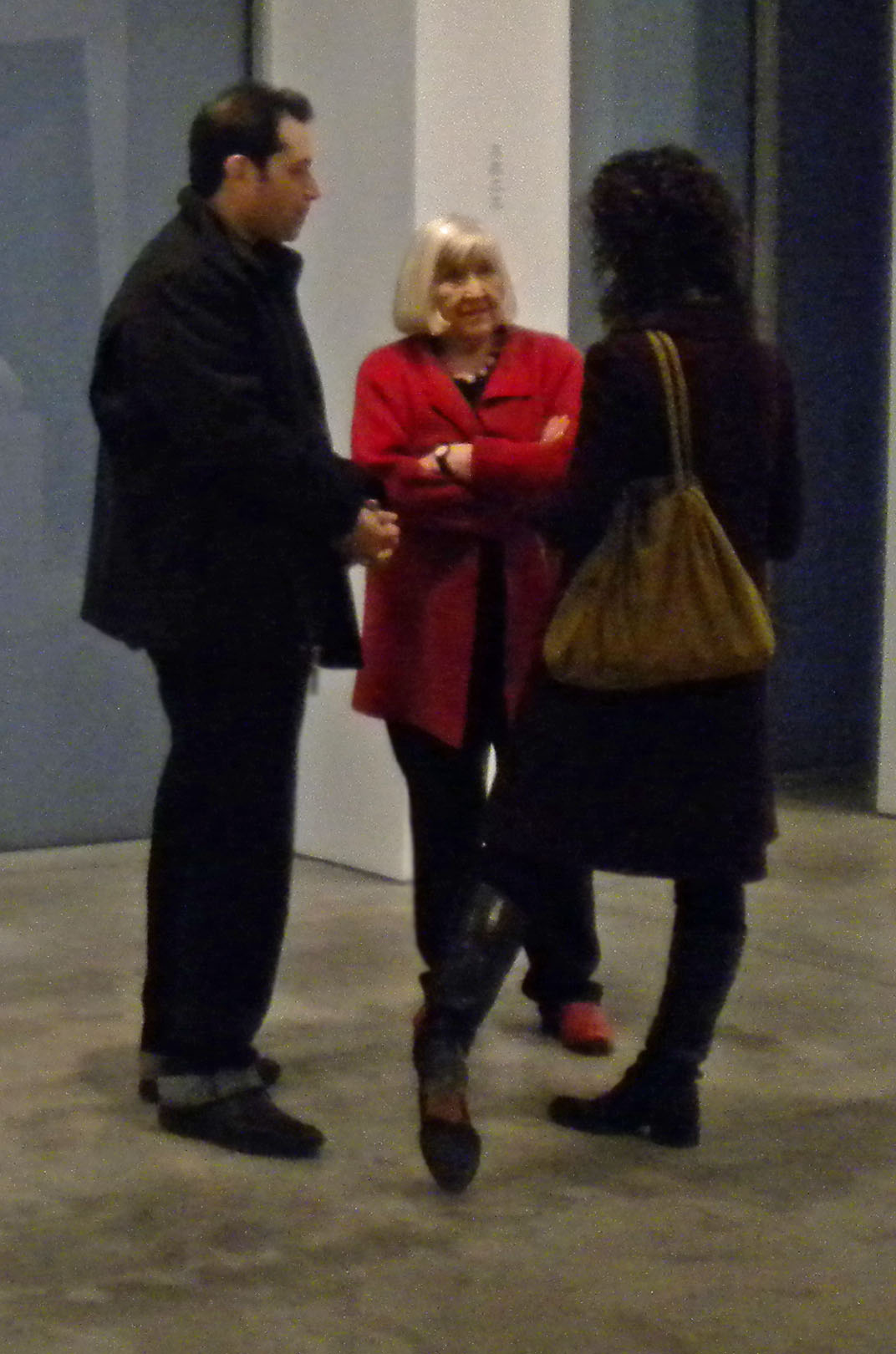
Hilla Becher (center) discussing her and her late husband's work at the Sonnabend Gallery in Chelsea, New York City, October 2010

Bernhard "Bernd" Becher (German: [ˈbɛçɐ]; 20 August 1931 – 22 June 2007), and Hilla Becher, née Wobeser (2 September 1934 – 10 October 2015), were German conceptual artists and photographers working as a collaborative duo. They are best known for their extensive series of photographic images, or typologies, of industrial buildings and structures, often organised in grids. As the founders of what has come to be known as the 'Becher school' or the Düsseldorf School of Photography, they influenced generations of documentary photographers and artists in Germany and abroad. They were awarded the Erasmus Prize and the Hasselblad Award.

== Biography ==
Bernd Becher was born in Siegen. He studied painting at the Staatliche Akademie der Bildenden Künste Stuttgart from 1953 to 1956, then typography under Karl Rössing at the Kunstakademie Düsseldorf from 1959 to 1961. Hilla Becher was born in Potsdam. Prior to Hilla's time studying photography at the Kunstakademie Düsseldorf from 1958 to 1961, she had completed an apprenticeship as a photographer in her native Potsdam. Both began working as freelance photographers for the Troost Advertising Agency in Düsseldorf, concentrating on product photography. They were married in 1961. The German-American photographer Max Becher (born 1964) is their son.

== Work ==
Meeting as students at the Kunstakademie Düsseldorf in 1957, Bernd and Hilla Becher first collaborated on photographing and documenting the disappearing German industrial architecture in 1959. The Ruhr Valley, where Becher's family had worked in the steel and mining industries, was their initial focus. They were fascinated by the similar shapes in which certain buildings were designed. After collating thousands of pictures of individual structures, they noticed that the various edifices – of cooling towers, gas tanks and coal bunkers, for instance – shared many distinctive formal qualities. In addition, they were intrigued by the fact that so many of these industrial buildings seemed to have been built with a great deal of attention toward design.

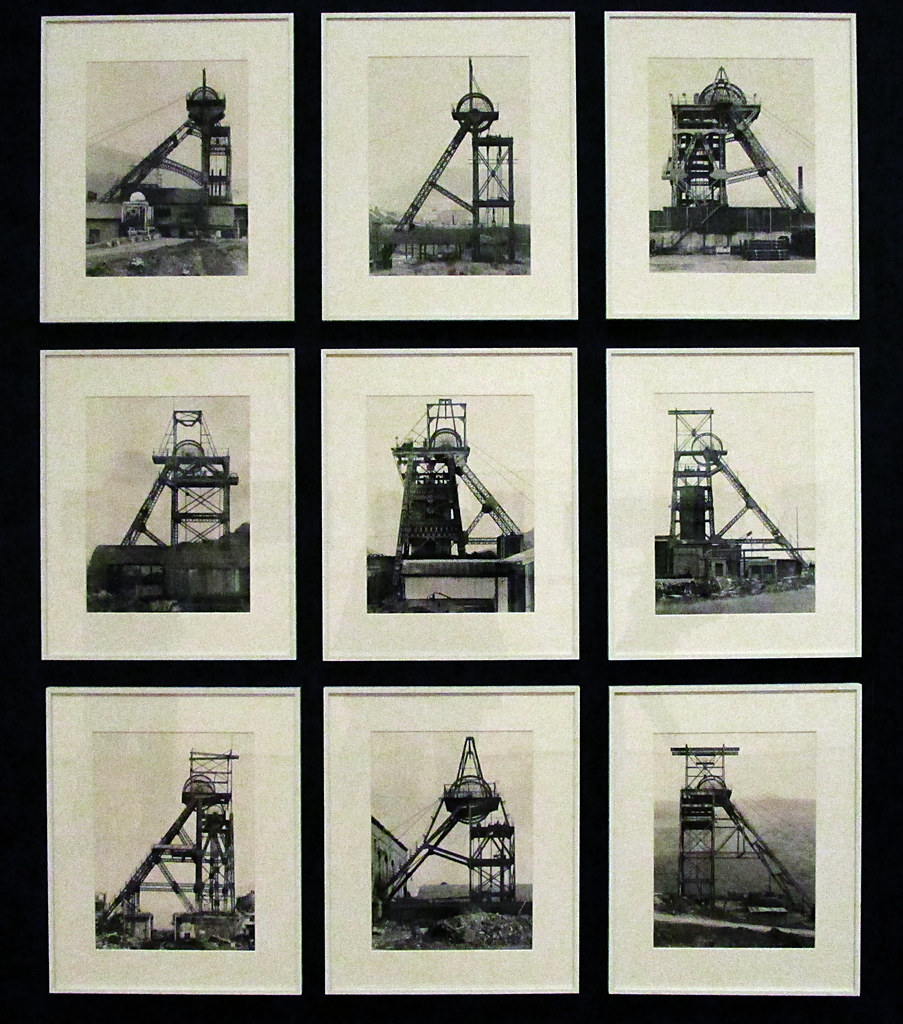
One of Bernd and Hilla Becher Typologies

Together, the Bechers first photographed with a 6x9cm camera and then (after 1961) mostly with a large format Plaubel Peco 13x18-centimeter (5x7-inch) monorail camera. They photographed these buildings from a number of different angles, but always with a straightforward "objective" point of view. The adjustable standards of the monorail camera enabled them perspective control to maintain parallel lines in their photographs. They used a range of optics from 90mm wide-angle lenses to 600mm telephoto lenses to make similar subjects appear similarly sized despite not being able to always photograph from the same distances. They chose to work in black and white both because of its capacity to capture three-dimensional volume without the distraction of color, and its reliability and cost in relation to the sensitized color materials at the time. After working with 13x18-centimeter glass photographic plates, they shifted to 25 ASA film speed negative sheet film around 1970. They typically made two exposures for each view, with a range of exposure times from 10 seconds to a minute. The Bechers shared darkroom tasks, with Bernd developing the negatives, and Hilla making the prints. To make the sky appear white in their prints, they often photographed on overcast days but optimized their lighting for each subject (using a blue filter when the sky was blue), or photographed early in the morning during the seasons of spring and fall. Their subjects included framework houses (timber framing), barns, water towers, coal tipples, cooling towers, grain elevators, coal bunkers, coke ovens, oil refineries, blast furnaces, gas tanks, storage silos, and warehouses. At each site the Bechers also created overall landscape photographs of the entire plant, which set the structures in their context and show how they relate to each other. They excluded any details that would detract from the central theme and instead set up comparisons of viewpoint and lighting through which the eye is led to the basic structural pattern of the images being compared. This principle, which is allied to the philosophy underlying the New Topographics movement, is most obvious in the two published series, Anonyme Skulpturen: Eine Typologie technischer Bauten and Typologien, Industrieller Bau, 1963–1975, in which the images are contrasted in groups of three. Another early project, which they pursued for nearly two decades, was published as Framework Houses (Schirmer/Mosel) in 1977, a visual catalog of types of structures, an approach that characterized much of their work.

In drawing attention to the cultural dimension of industrial architecture, their work also highlighted the need for preservation of these buildings. On the couple's initiative the Zollern II/IV Colliery at Dortmund-Bovinghausen in the Ruhr, a historicism structure with the exception of the machine hall (Art Nouveau), was designated a protected landmark.

The Bechers also photographed outside Germany, including from 1965 buildings in Great Britain, France, Belgium and later in the United States. In 1966, they undertook a six-month journey through England and south Wales, taking hundreds of photographs of the coal industry around Liverpool, Manchester, Sheffield, Nottingham and the Rhondda Valley. In 1974, they traveled to North America for the first time, touring sites in New Jersey, Michigan, Pennsylvania, and southern Ontario, depicting a range of industrial structures, from coal breakers to wooden winding towers.

The Bechers exhibited and published their single-image gelatin silver prints, grouped by subject, in a grid of six, nine, or fifteen. By the mid-1960s the Bechers had settled on a preferred presentational mode: the images of structures with similar functions are then displayed side by side to invite viewers to compare their forms and designs based on function, regional idiosyncrasies, or the age of the structures. The Bechers used the term "typology" to describe these ordered sets of photographs. The works' titles are pithy and captions note only time and location. In 1989–91, for an exhibition at the Dia Art Foundation in New York, the Bechers introduced a second format into their oeuvre: single images that are larger in size — twenty-four by twenty inches — and presented individually, rather than as gridded tableaux.

In 1976, Bernd Becher started teaching photography at the Kunstakademie Düsseldorf (policy matters prevented Hilla's simultaneous appointment), where he remained on the faculty until 1996. Before him, photography had been excluded from what was largely a school for painters. He influenced students that later made a name for themselves in the photography world. Former students of Bernd's included Andreas Gursky, Thomas Ruff, Thomas Struth, Candida Höfer, Axel Hütte and Elger Esser. Bernd died in Rostock.

After Bernd Becher's death, his widow Hilla continued to reassemble their works, mostly using existing photographs.

== Exhibitions ==
The Bechers had their first gallery exhibition in 1963 at the Galerie Ruth Nohl in Siegen. Their work became better known in the United States with the publication of their book Anonyme Skulpturen (Anonymous Sculptures) in 1970. The Bechers were shown at the George Eastman House and in solo exhibitions at Sonnabend Gallery, New York, in 1972. In 1974, the Institute of Contemporary Arts, London, organized an exhibition of their work, which toured the United Kingdom. The couple was invited to participate in Documenta 5, 6, 7, and 11 in Kassel in 1972, 1977, 1982 and 2002, and at the Bienal de São Paulo in 1977. The Stedelijk Van Abbemuseum, Eindhoven, organized a retrospective of the artists' work in 1981. In 1985 the artists had a major museum exhibition, which traveled to the Museum Folkwang, Essen, Musée d'Art Moderne de la Ville de Paris, and Musée d'Art Moderne de la Ville de Liège, Belgium. In 1991 the artists won the Leone d'Oro award for sculpture at the Venice Biennale. The Venice installation was reworked later in 1991, in a retrospective exhibition at the Kölnischer Kunstverein, Cologne. The Typologies installation was exhibited in 1994 at the Ydessa Hendeles Art Foundation, Toronto, and at the Westfälisches Landesmuseum für Kunst und Kulturgeschichte in Münster. Other retrospectives of the couple's work have been organized by the Photographische Sammlung/SK Stiftung Kulture in Cologne (1999 and 2003), Centre Georges Pompidou in Paris (2005) and Museum of Modern Art in New York (2008).

In 2014, Hilla Becher curated "August Sander/Bernd and Hilla Becher: 'A Dialogue'" at Bruce Silverstein Gallery in New York. Unlike previous displays, the Bechers' architectural images were displayed as singular "portraits" while Sander's photographs of people were represented as typological grids. In 2022, the Metropolitan Museum of Art held a major retrospective of their photographic oeuvre, which received "blockbuster" reviews from major art critics.

== Art market ==
The highest price reached by one of the duo's works was when Water Towers (1972), a grid of nine photographs, sold by $441,940, at Sotheby's Paris, on 15 November 2015.

== Legacy ==
The Becher school has influenced a number of (mainly) German photographers including Andreas Gursky, Thomas Struth, Thomas Ruff, Candida Höfer, Laurenz Berges, Bernhard Fuchs, Axel Hütte, Simone Nieweg, and Petra Wunderlich. The Canadian photographer Edward Burtynsky also drews inspiration from the duo and works in a similar mode. Aside from its vital documentary and analytical qualities, the Bechers' long-term project has also had a considerable impact on Minimalism and Conceptual Art since the 1970s. The Bernd and Hilla Becher Award, established by the city of Düsseldorf in 2020, is an art award named after them that recognizes outstanding achievements in the field of photography.

== Public collections ==
The Bechers' work is held, among others, in the following public collections:

- Art Institute of Chicago, Chicago
- Cleveland Museum of Art
- Dallas Museum of Art
- Harvard Art Museums
- J. Paul Getty Museum, Los Angeles
- Kunstmuseum Basel
- Los Angeles County Museum of Art
- Metropolitan Museum of Art, New York
- Milwaukee Art Museum
- Modern Art Museum of Fort Worth
- Museum of Contemporary Art Chicago
- Museum of Fine Arts, Boston
- Museum of Modern Art, New York
- National Gallery of Art, Washington, D.C.
- Peggy Guggenheim Collection, Venice
- San Francisco Museum of Modern Art
- Guggenheim Museum, New York
- Tate galleries, London
- Stedelijk Museum, Amsterdam

== Awards ==
- 1985: The Cultural Award from the German Society for Photography (DGPh)
- 2002: Erasmus Prize awarded to the Bechers in recognition of their roles as professors at the Kunstakademie Düsseldorf.
- 2004: Hasselblad Award from the Hasselblad Foundation awarded to the Bechers.
- 2014: Großer Kulturpreis, sponsored by the Sparkassen-Kulturstiftung Rheinland, awarded to Hilla Becher.

== Bibliography ==
=== Books by Bernd and Hilla Becher ===
- Industriebauten 1830–1930 : Eine fotografische Dokumentation, München, Die Neue Sammlung, 1967, 34 p., 103 ill., .
- Anonyme Skulpturen : Formvergleiche industrieller Bauten [Anonymous Sculptures : Form comparisons of industrial buildings], Düsseldorf, Städtische Kunsthalle Düsseldorf, 1969, 36 p., 21 ill., ISBN 978-3-92122-408-3.
- Anonyme Skulpturen : Eine Typologie technischer Bauten [Anonymous Sculptures : A typology of technical buildings], New York, Düsseldorf, Wittenborn & Co., Art Press, 1970, 216 p., 194 ill., ISBN 978-3-92122-408-3.
- Fotografien 1957 bis 1975, Köln, Rheinland-Verlag, 1975, 167 p., 124 ill., ISBN 978-3-79270-249-9.
- Fachwerkhäuserdes Siegener Industriegebietes [Framework Houses], München, Schirmer-Mosel, 1977, 356 p., 350 ill., ISBN 978-3-88814-005-1 [eng. ISBN 978-3-88814-013-6].
- Fördertürme [Chevalements, Mineheads], München, Schirmer-Mosel, 1985, 220 p., 196 ill., ISBN 3-88814-173-7.
- Wassertürme [Châteaux d'Eau, Water Towers], München, Schirmer-Mosel, 1988, 240 p., 223 ill., ISBN 978-3-88814-255-0 [fr. ISBN 978-3-88814-520-9, eng. ISBN 978-0-2620-2277-4].
- Hochöfen [Blast Furnaces], München, Schirmer-Mosel, 1990, 272 p., 319 ill., ISBN 3-88814-352-7 [eng. ISBN 978-3-88814-352-6, fr. ISBN 978-3-88814-558-2].
- Tipologie – Typologien – Typologies : Katalog der 44. Biennale Venedig 1990, München, Schirmer-Mosel, 1990, 64 p., 321 ill., ISBN 3-88814-417-5 | 1999 : ISBN 3-88814-593-7.
- Pennsylvania Coal Mine Tipples [Pennsylvanische Kleinbergwerke], München, Schirmer-Mosel, 1991, 136 p., 99 ill., ISBN 3-88814-408-6 [engl. ISBN 3-88814-416-7].
- Gasbehälter [Gas Tanks], München, Schirmer-Mosel, 1993, 120 p., 102 ill., ISBN 3-88814-493-0 [engl. ISBN 3-88814-681-X].
- Grundformen [Basic Forms], München, Schirmer-Mosel, 1993, 160 p., 64 ill., ISBN 3-88814-704-2 | 1999 : coll. Meister der Kamera ISBN 3-88814-959-2 [engl. ISBN 3-88814-400-0] | 2014 : ISBN 978-3-82960694-3.
- Fabrikhallen [Industrial Façades], München, Schirmer-Mosel, 1994, 276 p., 264 ill., ISBN 3-88814-730-1.
- Fördertürme [Mineheads], München, Schirmer-Mosel, 1997, 200 p., 190 ill., ISBN 3-88814-803-0.
- Serien Bernd & Hilla Becher, Mainz, Hermann Schmidt, 1998, 134 p., ill., ISBN 978-3-8743-9460-4.
- Zeche Hannibal [Coal Mine Hannibal], München, Schirmer-Mosel, 2000, 124 p., 170 ill., ISBN 978-3-88814-937-5.
- Festschrift : Erasmuspreis 2002, München, Schirmer-Mosel, 2002, 168 p., 128 ill., ISBN 978-3-8296-0064-4.
- Industrielandschaften [Industrial Landscapes], München, Schirmer-Mosel, 2002, 272 p., 180 ill., ISBN 978-3-8296-0003-3.
- Typologien industrieller Bauten [Typologies of Industrial Buildings], München, Schirmer-Mosel, 2003, 276 p., 1.528 ill.,ISBN 978-3-8296-0092-7.
- Grundformen industrieller Bauten [Basic Forms of Industrial Buildings], München, Schirmer-Mosel, 2004, 144 p., 61 ill., ISBN 978-3-8296-0150-4 [engl. ISBN 978-3-8296-0173-3].
- Kühltürme [Cooling Towers], München, Schirmer-Mosel, 2005, 244 p., 236 ill., ISBN 978-3-8296-0192-4.
- Getreidesilos [Grain Elevators], München, Schirmer-Mosel, 2006, 256 p., 246 ill., ISBN 978-3-8296-0256-3.
- Zeche Concordia, Linz, Oberösterreichisches Landesmuseum Linz, 2007, 55 p., ill., ISBN 978-3-8547-4166-4.
- Bernd and Hilla Becher at Museo Morandi, München, Schirmer-Mosel, 2009, 48 p., 173 ill., ISBN 978-3-8296-0406-2.
- Bergwerke und Hütten [Coal Mines and Steel Mills], München, Schirmer-Mosel, 2010, 188 p., 154 ill., ISBN 978-3-8296-0467-3 [engl. ISBN 978-3-8296-0474-1].
- Zeche Hannover – Hannover Coal Mine, München, Schirmer-Mosel, 2010, 280 p., 237 ill., ISBN 978-3-8296-0468-0.
- Steinwerke und Kalköfen [Stonework and Lime Kilns], München, Schirmer-Mosel, 2013, 256 p., 232 ill., ISBN 978-3-8296-0576-2.

=== Books about Bernd and Hilla Becher ===
- Bernd & Hilla Becher speak with Moritz Neumüller. Madrid: La Fábrica / Fundación Telefónica, 2005. By Moritz Neumüller. ISBN 978-84-96466-04-3.
- Bernd and Hilla Becher: Life and Work. Cambridge, Massachusetts: MIT Press, 2006. By Susanne Lange. ISBN 0-262-12286-3.
- Bernd & Hilla Becher. (Catalogue in conjunction with the 2022 exhibit at the Metropolitan Museum of Art) New York, New York: Metropolitan Museum of Art, New York, 2022. By Jeff L. Rosenheim. ISBN 978-1-58839-755-3.
