= Petra Wunderlich =

German photographer

- Born: 1954 (age 71–72); Gelsenkirchen, West Germany
- Education: Bernd Becher
- Known for: Photography
- Movement: Düsseldorf School of Photography

Petra Wunderlich (born in 1954 in Gelsenkirchen) is a German photographer. She is associated with the Düsseldorf School of Photography. Wunderlich lives and works in Düsseldorf and New York.

== Studies ==
Wunderlich studied at first painting at the École nationale supérieure des beaux-arts de Paris, from 1975 to 1985. She later decided to study photography, and as such was as a master student under Bernd Becher at the Kunstakademie Düsseldorf, from 1985 to 1988. Wunderlich belongs to the first generation of students of the Düsseldorf School of Photography. She received a work scholarship from the Kunstfonds Foundation, in 1987, and the Karl Schmidt Rottluff Scholarship, in 1988.

== Work ==
The central themes in Wunderlich's work are church buildings and quarries. She always photographs in black and white. Her works are always devoided of people.

A subject of her work are the quarries in Carrara, which she has been photographing since the 1980s, and also from Solnhofen, since the 1990s. These quarries rock layers reflect the history of art and architecture, because great masters such as Michelangelo have worked with marble from Carrara, similarly to many architects and builders since the Roman Empire days.

Quarries also provide the raw material for the church buildings. In her early works, Wunderlich photographed the churches as seen from the front and with a strong cropping, never depicting the whole building. This formal rigor was later broken by showing different buildings and their interaction. For the series mapping (1994–1998), Wunderlich photographed the many different churches that exist in Brooklyn, New York. She shows how the different ethnic groups that live there inscribe their own religion and aesthetics into the cityscape, by designing the facades with religious references. Wunderlich also created a photographic series of synagogues in New York, from 1995 to 2015, first shown with the title Common Ground at the Bernhard Knaus Fine Art Gallery in Frankfurt, in 2013–2014.

== Exhibitions (selection) ==
- Seven Stones, BERNHARD KNAUS FINE ART, Frankfurt, Germany (solo), 2013
- No-Men's Land - 7 Positions of contemporary Photography, Neuer Kunstverein Aschaffenburg e.V, Aschaffenburg, Germany, 2011–2012
- Die Erfindung der Wirklichkeit - Photographie an der Kunstakademie Düsseldorf von 1970 bis heute, Kunstakademie Düsseldorf, Düsseldorf, Germany, 2010–2011
- Viaggio in Italia, Palazzo Fabroni, Pistoia, Italy, 2010-2011
