= Candida Höfer =

German photographer (born 1944)

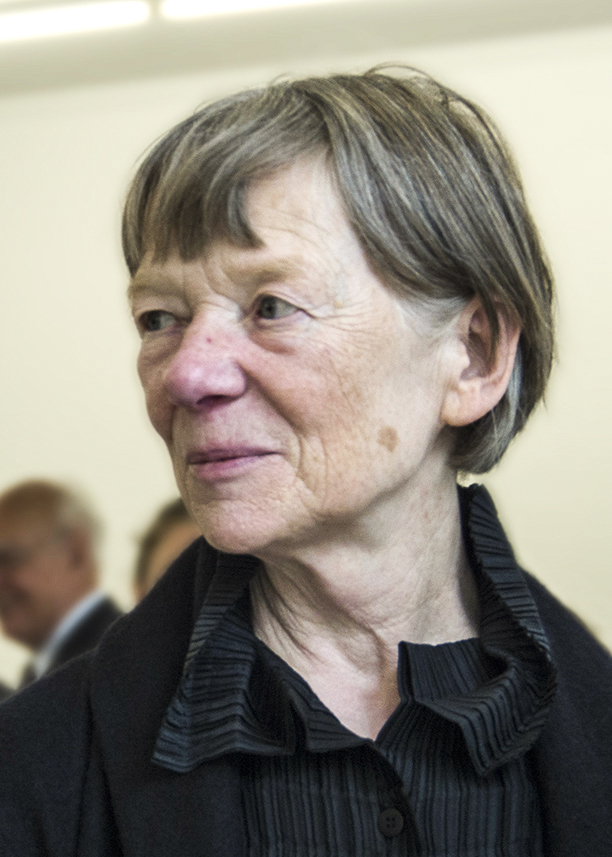
- Höfer in 2013
- Born: 4 February 1944 (age 82); Eberswalde, Province of Brandenburg, Germany
- Education: Kunstakademie Düsseldorf
- Known for: Photography
- Movement: Düsseldorf School of Photography

Candida Höfer (born 4 February 1944) is a German photographer known for her exploration of public spaces and architecture. In her career she transitioned from portraiture to focusing on spaces like libraries and museums. She is a former student of Bernd and Hilla Becher. Höfer's work is known for technical perfection and a strictly conceptual approach. Her work explores the ways in which institutional architecture shapes and directs human experience.

From 1997 to 2000, she taught as professor at the Karlsruhe University of Arts and Design. Höfer is the recipient of the 2018 Outstanding Contribution to Photography award, as part of the Sony World Photography Awards. She is based in Cologne.

== Early life and education ==
Candida Höfer was born in 1944 in Eberswalde, Province of Brandenburg. Höfer is a daughter of the German journalist Werner Höfer. From 1964 to 1968 Höfer studied at the Kölner Werkschulen (Cologne Academy of Fine and Applied Arts). After graduation, she began working for newspapers as a portrait photographer, producing a series on Liverpudlian poets. From 1970 to 1972, she studied daguerreotypes while working as an assistant to Werner Bokelberg in Hamburg. She later attended the Kunstakademie Düsseldorf from 1973 to 1982, where she studied film under Ole John and, from 1976, photography under Bernd Becher. Along with Thomas Ruff, she was one of the first of Becher's students to use color, showing her work as slide projections. While at school, she conceived a film she shot jointly with Tony Morgan in the Düsseldorf ice cream parlour Da Forno in 1975.

== Work ==
Höfer initially worked with black-and-white photography, such as with Flipper (1973), a large photo-collage consisting of 47 gelatin silver prints. The images all depict pinball machines in arcades and pubs, sometimes seen with players and sometimes by themselves. Shortly afterwards, she began working on her 'Türken in Deutschland' (Turks in Germany) series (1973–1979), which follows Turkish migrant families in their new German homes. It was during this period that Höfer became interested in color, as she felt it suited her works better, and in interior spaces and their impact on the people who inhabit them and vice versa.

Höfer began taking color photographs of interiors of public buildings, such as offices, banks, and waiting rooms, in 1979. Her breakthrough to fame came with a series of photographs showing guest workers in Germany, after which she concentrated on the subjects Interiors, Rooms and Zoological Gardens. Höfer specializes in large-format photographs of empty interiors and social spaces that capture the "psychology of social architecture". Her photographs are taken from a classic straight-on frontal angle or seek a diagonal in the composition. She tends to shoot each actionless room from an elevated vantage point near one wall so that the far wall is centered within the resulting image. From her earliest creations, she has been interested in representing public spaces such as museums, libraries, national archives or opera houses devoid of all human presence. Höfer's imagery has consistently focused on these depopulated interiors since the 1980s. Höfer groups her photographs into series that have institutional themes as well as geographical ones, but the formal similarity among her images is their dominant organizing principle.

In her Zoologische Gärten series (1991), Höfer shifted her focus away from interiors to zoos in Germany, Spain, England, France and the Netherlands. Implementing her typically descriptive style, Höfer's images again seek to deconstruct the role institutions play in defining the viewer's gaze by documenting animals in their caged environments.

In 2001, for Douze-Twelve, commissioned by the Musée des Beaux-Arts et de la Dentelle in Calais and later shown at Documenta 11, Höfer photographed all 12 casts of Auguste Rodin's The Burghers of Calais in their installations in various museums and sculpture gardens. From 2004 to 2007, she traveled the world to photograph conceptual artist On Kawara's iconic Date Paintings in the homes of private collectors. In 2005, Höfer embarked upon a project at the Musée du Louvre, documenting its various galleries, examining not only the sacred art they exhibit but also their individual design, arches, tiles and embellishments, with spectators and tourists entirely absent.

== Interpretation in Institutional Photography ==
Candida Höfer's photography, particularly her Libraries series, extends beyond architectural documentation to provide a detailed examination of institutional culture. The works parallel Sharon Macdonald's ethnographic study of the Science Museum in London. Höfer's images, marked by the absence of human presence, enable viewers to focus on the undisturbed tranquility and vibrant colors of spaces such as the British Library and the Whitney Museum. This "architecture of absence" draws attention to the unseen labor and institutional decisions that shape visitor experiences. Her large-scale photographs capture the essence of library spaces, emphasizing architectural beauty, intricate interior details, and the interplay of light and shadow. Höfer's precise use of symmetry and composition enhances the visual impact and documents the cultural and historical significance of these spaces. By highlighting architectural elements and institutional structures, her work reveals the complex interplay between architecture, institutional directives, and cultural representation. Höfer's focus on textures and materials adds a tactile dimension, intending to encourage viewers to imagine the physical sensations of these grand spaces. Some readings of her work adopt a ethnographic and thematic organization enhancing an understanding of how institutional spaces are designed and experienced, exploring the social architecture and cultural narratives inherent within these environments.

== Exhibitions ==
Höfer's first solo exhibition was in 1975 at the Konrad Fischer Galerie in Düsseldorf. Since then, Höfer has had solo exhibitions in museums throughout Europe and the United States, including the Centro de Fotografía at the Universidad de Salamanca, the Galerie de l’École des Beaux-Arts in Valenciennes, the Kunsthalle Bremen, the Louvre, the Kunsthalle Nürnberg, the Kunsthaus Hamburg, the Museum of Contemporary Photography (MoCP)), the Museum Folkwang, and the Rheinisches Landesmuseum Bonn She has also had an exhibition at the Portikus in Frankfurt am Main. She was a part of the "German Photography: Documentation and Introspection" at Aldrich Museum of Contemporary Art in 1990 as one of nine artists highlighted. In 2001 she was part of "Minimalismos: Un Signo de los Tiempos" at Museo Nacional Centro de Arte Reina Sofía. She was included by Okwui Enwezor in Documenta 11 in Kassel in 2002. In 2003 the artist represented Germany with the late Martin Kippenberger in the German Pavilion at the Venice Biennale, which was curated by Julian Heynen. The first comprehensive North American survey of her work was shown under the title Architecture of Absence at Norton Museum of Art in 2006. That same year, she had a solo exhibition at the Irish Museum of Modern Art, Dublin. She is currently represented by Sean Kelly Gallery and Kotaro Nukaga in Japan.

== Art market ==
The highest price reached by one of her photographs was when Biblioteca Geral da Universidade de Coimbra IV (2006) sold by £80,500 ($121,233) at Christie's London, on 12 February 2015.

== Personal life ==
Höfer lives and works in Cologne.

== Awards ==
- 2015: Cologne Fine Art Prize
- 2018: Outstanding Contribution to Photography award, Sony World Photography Awards
- 2022: Achievement in Architecture, Lucie Awards
- 2024: Käthe Kollwitz Prize

== Collections ==
Höfer's work is held in the following permanent public collections:

- Jewish Museum, New York
- Solomon R. Guggenheim Museum, New York
- Museum of Modern Art, New York
- International Center for Photography, New York
- San Francisco Museum of Modern Art, San Francisco, CA
- Tate, London

== See also ==
- List of German women artists
