= Andreas Gursky =

German photographer (born 1955)

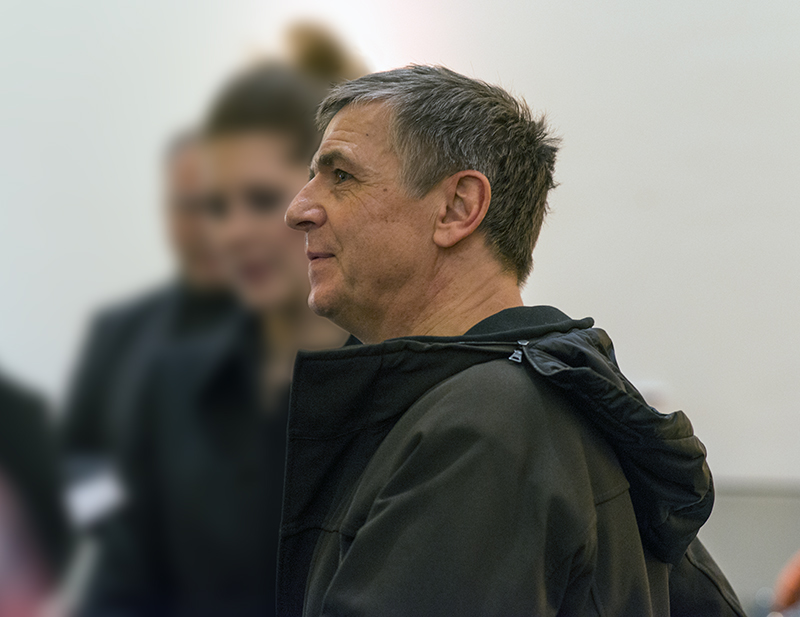
- Andreas Gursky in 2013
- Born: 15 January 1955 (age 71); Leipzig, East Germany (now Germany)
- Known for: Photography
- Notable work: Rhein II
- Movement: Düsseldorf School of Photography
- Website: Official website

Andreas Gursky (born 15 January 1955) is a German artist best known for his photography. He is a former professor at the Kunstakademie Düsseldorf, Germany.

He is known for his large-scale colour photographs of architecture, landscapes and contemporary life—crowds, consumer goods and the infrastructures of global capitalism—combining methodical observation with digital construction to achieve an all-over, hyper-detailed image field. His works reach some of the highest prices in the art market. His photograph Rhein II was sold at Christie's for $4,338,500 on 8 November 2011. At the time it was the most expensive photograph ever sold at auction, and it remains the most expensive photograph by a living photographer.

He was also involved in the establishment of the Deutsches Fotoinstitut (German Institute for Photography) in Düsseldorf, the first national institution for photography in Germany.

== Early life and education ==
Gursky was born in Leipzig, East Germany, in 1955. He was the son of photographer Willy Gursky (1921–2016) and the grandson of photographer Hans Gursky (1890–1969). His family relocated to West Germany, moving to Essen and then Düsseldorf by the end of 1957. Between 1981 and 1987, he studied at the Kunstakademie Düsseldorf, where he was a student of Bernd Becher. Earlier, from 1978 to 1981, he had studied visual communication with a focus on photography at the Folkwang University of the Arts in Essen (then Folkwangschule/Universität Gesamthochschule Essen) under photographers Otto Steinert and Michael Schmidt.

== Career and style ==
Before the 1990s, Gursky did not digitally manipulate his images. In the years since, Gursky has been frank about his reliance on computers to edit and enhance his pictures, creating an art of spaces larger than the subjects photographed. Writing in The New Yorker magazine, the critic Peter Schjeldahl called these pictures "vast," "splashy," "entertaining," and "literally unbelievable." In the same publication, critic Calvin Tomkins described Gursky as one of the "two masters" of the Düsseldorf School of Photography. In 2001, Tomkins described the experience of confronting one of Gursky's large works:

The first time I saw photographs by Andreas Gursky...I had the disorienting sensation that something was happening—happening to me, I suppose, although it felt more generalized than that. Gursky's huge, panoramic colour prints—some of them up to six feet high by ten feet long—had the presence, the formal power, and in several cases the majestic aura of nineteenth-century landscape paintings, without losing any of their meticulously detailed immediacy as photographs. Their subject matter was the contemporary world, seen dispassionately and from a distance.

The perspective in many of Gursky's photographs is drawn from an elevated vantage point. This position enables the viewer to encounter scenes, encompassing both centre and periphery, which are ordinarily beyond reach. This sweeping perspective has been linked to an engagement with globalization. Visually, Gursky is drawn to large, anonymous, man-made spaces—high-rise facades at night, office lobbies, stock exchanges, the interiors of big box retailers (See his print 99 Cent II Diptychon). In a 2001 retrospective, New York's Museum of Modern Art described the artist's work, "a sophisticated art of unembellished observation. It is thanks to the artfulness of Gursky's fictions that we recognize his world as our own." Gursky's style is enigmatic and deadpan. There is little to no explanation or manipulation on the works. His photography is straightforward.

The photograph 99 Cent (1999) was taken at a 99 Cents Only store on Sunset Boulevard in Los Angeles, and depicts its interior as a stretched horizontal composition of parallel shelves, intersected by vertical white columns, in which the abundance of "neatly labeled packets are transformed into fields of colour, generated by endless arrays of identical products, reflecting off the shiny ceiling" (Wyatt Mason). Rhein II (1999), depicts a stretch of the river Rhine outside Düsseldorf, immediately legible as a view of a straight stretch of water, but also as an abstract configuration of horizontal bands of colour of varying widths. In his six-part series Ocean I-VI (2009–2010), Gursky used high-definition satellite photographs which he augmented from various picture sources on the Internet.

== Art market ==
Most of Gursky's photographs come in editions of six with two artist's proofs.

Since 2010, Gursky has been represented by Gagosian Gallery. He held the record for highest price paid at auction for a single photographic image from 2011 to 2022. His work Rhein II sold for US$4,338,500 at Christie's, New York on 8 November 2011. In 2013, Chicago Board of Trade III (1999–2009) sold for $3,298,755, an auction record for a Gursky exchange photo. A 2024 overview by the photography site Expert Photography lists Rhein II in third place among the most expensive photographs ever sold, behind works by Man Ray and Edward Steichen. It remains the most expensive photograph by a living photographer.

== Publications ==
- Andreas Gursky. Cologne: Galerie Johnen + Schöttle, 1988. Exhibition catalogue.
- Andreas Gursky. Krefeld: Museum Haus Lange, 1989. Exhibition catalogue.
- Siemens Kulturprogramm: Projekte 1992. Munich: Siemens AG, 1992. Exhibition catalogue.
- Andreas Gursky.Cologne: Buchhandlung Walther König; Zurich: Kunsthalle, 1992. Exhibition catalogue.
- Fotografien 1984–1993. Hamburg: Deichtorhallen; Munich: Schirmer/ Mosel, 1994. Exhibition catalogue.
- Montparnasse. Cologne: Portikus & Oktagon, 1995. Exhibition catalogue.
- Andreas Gursky. Malmö: Rooseum Center for Contemporary Art, Malmö; Cologne, Oktagon, 1995. Exhibition catalogue.
- Images. London: Tate, 1995. Exhibition catalogue.
- Andreas Gursky: Fotografien 1984 bis heute. Düsseldorf: Kunsthalle Düsseldorf; Munich: Schirmer/Mosel, 1998. Exhibition catalogue.
- Andreas Gursky. Fotografien 1994–1998. Wolfsburg: Kunstmuseum Wolfsburg; Ostfildern, Hatje Cantz, 1998. Exhibition catalogue.
- Currents 27. Andreas Gursky. Houston: Contemporary Arts Museum, Houston, 1998. Exhibition catalogue.
- Andreas Gursky. New York: Museum of Modern Art; Ostfildern: Hatje Cantz, 2001. Exhibition catalogue.
- Andreas Gursky. Paris: Centre national d’art et de culture Georges-Pompidou, 2002. Exhibition catalogue.
- Andreas Gursky. Cologne: Snoeck, 2007. Edited by Thomas Weski. ISBN 978-3-936859-62-1. With an essay in English and German by Weski, and a text by Don DeLillo, "In Yankee Stadium". Exhibition catalogue.
- Andreas Gursky. Basel: Kunstmuseum; Ostfildern: Hatje Cantz, 2007. Exhibition catalogue.
- Kaiserringträger der Stadt Goslar 2008. Goslar: Mönchehaus Museum; Goslar, Verein zur Förderung moderner Kunst, 2008. Exhibition catalogue.
- Architektur. Darmstadt: Institut Mathildenhöhe; Ostfildern, Hatje Cantz, 2008. Exhibition catalogue.
- Werke – Works 80-08. Kunstmuseen Krefeld/ Moderna Museet, Stockholm/ Vancouver Art Gallery; Ostfildern: Hatje Cantz, 2008. Exhibition catalogue.
- Andreas Gursky. Los Angeles: Gagosian Gallery; New York: Rizzoli, 2010. Exhibition catalogue. Two volumes.
- Andreas Gursky at Louisiana. Louisiana: Louisiana Museum of Modern Art; Ostfildern: Hatje Cantz, 2011. Exhibition catalogue.
- Bangkok. Düsseldorf: Stiftung Museum Kunstpalast; Göttingen: Steidl, 2012. Exhibition catalogue.
- Andreas Gursky. Tokyo: The National Art Centre; Osaka: The National Museum of Art; Tokyo/Osaka: Yomiuri Shimbun, 2013. Exhibition catalogue.
- Landscapes. Exhibition catalogue. Water Mills: Parrish Art Museum; New York: Rizzoli, 2015.
- Andreas Gursky. Steidl/Hayward Gallery, 2018. Exhibition catalog.

== Exhibitions ==
Gursky’s first solo exhibition was held at Galerie Johnen & Schöttle, Cologne, in 1988. This was followed by Andreas Gursky, Kunsthalle Zürich, Switzerland, in 1992. In 2001 he presented a solo exhibition at The Museum of Modern Art (MoMA), New York. Major museum exhibitions include Haus der Kunst, Munich (2007); Kunstmuseum Basel (2007–2008); Andreas Gursky: Werke/Works 1980–2008, Museen Haus Lange and Haus Esters, Krefeld (2008); Andreas Gursky, Louisiana Museum of Modern Art, Humlebæk (2012); Andreas Gursky, The National Art Center, Tokyo (2013); Andreas Gursky – nicht abstrakt, Kunstsammlung Nordrhein-Westfalen, K20, Düsseldorf (2016); Andreas Gursky, Hayward Gallery, London (2018); and Andreas Gursky. Visual Spaces of Today, MAST Bologna (2023). His work has also been shown in international exhibitions such as the Venice Biennale (1990 and 2004) and the Biennale of Sydney (1996 and 2000).

== Public collections ==
Gursky's work is held, among others, in the following public collections:

- Art Institute of Chicago, Chicago
- Berardo Collection Museum, Lisbon
- Castle of Rivoli, Rivoli, Turin
- Centre Pompidou, Paris
- Kunsthaus, Zürich
- Kunstmuseum, Basel
- Kunstmuseum, Bonn
- Kunstsammlung Nordrhein-Westfalen, Düsseldorf
- Los Angeles County Museum of Art, Los Angeles
- Metropolitan Museum of Art, New York
- Milwaukee Art Museum, Milwaukee
- Museo Jumex, in Mexico City.
- Museum Ludwig, Cologne
- Museum of Contemporary Art, Chicago
- Museum of Contemporary Art, Los Angeles
- Museum of Modern Art, New York
- National Galleries of Scotland, Edinburgh
- National Gallery of Art, Washington, D.C.
- San Francisco Museum of Modern Art, San Francisco
- Solomon R. Guggenheim Museum, New York
- Stedelijk Museum, Amsterdam
- Tate Modern, London

== See also ==
- List of most expensive photographs
- Aerial landscape art
- Contemporary art
- Globalization
