= The Painter Anton Räderscheidt =

Photograph by August Sander

The Painter Anton Räderscheidt is a black and white photograph taken by German photographer August Sander, in 1926. It depicts the painter Anton Räderscheidt, a member of the New Objectivity artist movement, in a street of Cologne. It was included in his book Face of Our Time (1929).

== History and description ==
Sander was involved in the artistic scene of Cologne, in the 1920s, which included painters like Max Ernst, Heinrich Hoerle, Anton Räderscheidt and his wife, Marta Hegemann. The couple of Räderscheidt and Hegemann had been involved in the Dada movement, creating the journal Stupidien, in 1920. They were also members of the group known as Cologne Progressives. Sander was friend with several of these artists and photographed them, sometimes several times. Räderscheidt himself, who had served in World War I, like Sander, was the subject of several photographs, sometimes in the company of his wife, Marta.

The current photograph presents Räderscheidt alone, with his arms and hands visible, dressed in a suit and coat, and with a bowler hat, staring at the viewer, with an inquisitive expression, in a desert cityscape of Cologne, which serves has the background. Buildings are seem at his left, but the sidewalks and the street seem totally empty of human presence, which increases the sense of isolation of the figure. Sander seems to have taken inspiration from Räderscheidt own paintings, where he often depicts men with bowler hats, sometimes in the company of a woman, in a lone urban environment.

Sander took at the same occasion a variant of the current photograph, where the painter appears with his arms behind his back. Räderscheidt described possibly this variant at the catalogue of the Neue Kunst, Alte Kunst exhibition, held in 1926, with the following text: "I am 34 years old and was born in Cologne. I paint the man with the bowler hat and the hundred percent woman who steers him through the picture. My fondness for the horizontal and the vertical is a means of guiding the observer through my pictures."

== Art market ==
A print of the variant of the photograph where the artist appears with his hands behind his back, which is more rare, was sold by $269,000 at Sotheby's New York, on 12 December 2014.

== Public collections ==
There are prints of the better known version of this photograph, among other public collections, at the August Sander Archive, in Cologne, the Städel Museum, the Musée National d'Art Moderne, in Paris, the Moderna Museet, in Stockholm, the Museum of Modern Art, in New York, the Metropolitan Museum of Art, in New York, and the Art Gallery of New South Wales, in Sydney.
