= Angelika Hoerle =

German painter

- Born: Margaretha Angelika Fick; 20 November 1899; Cologne, German Empire
- Died: 9 September 1923 (aged 23); Cologne, Germany
- Known for: Painting
- Movement: Dada
- Spouse: Heinrich Hoerle (m. 1919)

Angelika Hoerle (née Margaretha Angelika Fick; 20 November 1899 – 9 September 1923) was a German Dada artist who was a founding member of the Cologne art group Stupid and the cofounder of a Dadaist publishing house.

== Life ==
Margaretha Angelika Fick was born 20 November 1899 in Cologne, Germany as the youngest of cabinetmaker Richard Fick and Anna (Kraft) Fick's four children. Her sibling Willy Fick (1893–1967), while apprenticed as a cabinet maker, took evening and weekend courses at the Koelner Kunstgewerbeschule where he met artists Heinrich Hoerle, Franz Wilhelm Seiwert, Anton Raederscheidt and Marta Hegemann. Angelika was introduced to these artists and their friend Max Ernst, through Willy.

Fascinated by art, especially by women in art like Hegemann, Angelika sketched and visited exhibitions during her apprenticeship in millinery. She saw the works of artist/designer Marie Laurencin and sculptor Milly Steger at the Sonderbund Exhibition in Cologne in 1912. At the Deutsche Werkbund Exhibition in Cologne in 1914 she saw more works by female creators in the House of Women where there were sculptures, batik fabrics, wall hangings, rugs and linoleum designs by women.

Angelika drew nearer Seiwert's friends Kaethe and Oskar Jatho during World War I when the Jatho home became a gathering point for anti-war activists. Heinrich Hoerle and Willy Fick were registered as conscientious objectors and as such did not take up war service until 1917—Fick as a wagon driver and Hoerle as a telephonist. In June 1919 Angelika eloped with Heinrich Hoerle against her parents’ wishes. For a honeymoon the couple went to Simonskall in the Eifel Mountains where the Jatho family and Seiwert established the artists’ colony called Kalltalgemeinschaft. Jatho dedicated her poem Gemeinschaft to Angelika Hoerle. That same year the couple was involved in pre-dada disruptive activities that included distributing Der Ventilator, a leftist journal at factory gates and illegally placarding buildings with art, such as a proof print of Heinrich Hoerle's Krueppelmappe.

Angelika and Heinrich Hoerle established a "dadaheim", a term used by the Cologne press for their apartment, but, there were multiple interconnected "dadaheims" in Cologne. Marta Hegemann, had married Anton Raederscheidt and art historian Luise Straus, had married artist Max Ernst in 1918 and their homes were also focal points for anti-establishment activities. By 1921 Angelika Hoerle showed symptoms of tuberculosis, aggravated by the couple's poverty. They lived without heat in winter and hustled wallpaper and men's tie designs to industrial clients to afford food. Angelika was very ill by 1922 when her husband abandoned her, fearing the disease which had killed his father and from which his sister Marie died in 1924. In an unpublished novella, EntArtet, MAF Raderscheidt (Marta Hegemann's granddaughter) and Stephan Everling paint the word picture of Angelika playing her harmonica to stave off loneliness as she walked from the Raderscheidts’ atelier/home on Hildeboldplatz to her lonely garret in Lindenthal. Willy Fick and the Raederscheidts supported her but Angelika died on 9 September 1923—at 23.

== Art career at 19 ==
Angelika Hoerle's art career officially began in 1919 with the publication of Lebendige, a folder of six woodcuts that depicted murdered revolutionaries. She worked with artists Seiwert and Raederscheidt and architect Peter Abelen who considered the young artist well-versed enough in the international politics of the day to take on the task of creating prints for Jean Jaures and Eugen Levine. In the September 1919 issue of Sozialistische Republik she followed Lebendige with a cartoon that parodied Cologne's police chief and showed her knowledge of local politics. Angelika affiliated herself with Karl Nierendorf and his newly created Gesellschaft der Kuenste (GdK), but, despite the GdK's stated intentions to revolutionize art, Angelika took part in the dada secession from the 1919 GdK exhibition at the Cologne Kunstverein. The splinter exhibition, called Section D, issued a catalogue, Bulletin D that showed her, Heinrich Hoerle, Seiwert, Max Ernst and Raederscheidt as participants.

== Art career in the Stupid group and as a publisher ==
In February 1920 the Graphisches Kabinet von Bergh & Co in Duesseldorf exhibited the Section D works, thus providing it with some heft, and Angelika co-founded the Stupid group with her brother Willy, the Raederscheidts and Seiwert. She showed works at their ongoing Hildeboldplatz exhibitions in 1920 and 1921 and participated in Stupid Verlag publications. Simultaneously, she co-founded Schloemilch Verlag with her husband and it published Max Ernst's folder of prints called Fiat modes, pereat ars (Let there be fashion, down with art) which echoed elements that Angelika used in her own drawings. Schloemilch Verlag/ ABK also published Heinrich Hoerle's Krueppelmappe of twelve lithographs showing war "cripples". Most significantly, Schloemilch, with Angelika as co-publisher, produced Die Schammade, a sophisticated international dada publication. Angelika's ironic works Roehren and Reiterin were prominently placed in Schammade.

== Worker actions ==
Dada and politics mixed again when Stupid helped organize a dada evening at the Monarch Hotel in Aachen. The Cologne connection to Aachen came through the union movement, FAUD (Freie Arbeiter Union Deutschland) and its offshoot, Linksradikale Jugend Aachen, of which Seiwert was a member. Raderscheidt and Hoerle were documented at the Monarch fracas. Angelika as a trade union advocate, friend to Raederscheidt and as Hoerle's partner would have been there as well. Angelika's two ironic pencil drawings, Hotelboy und Mann I and II poke fun at the hotel staff that was flummoxed by the brouhaha that ensued when the nonsensical activities began. Following up with their interest focused on workers, Angelika and Heinrich listed themselves as the co-chairs for the Cologne Subcommittee of the German-wide Artists’ Committee for Starving Artists in Russia. Their plea for support was printed in Die Sozialistische Republik of December 1922.

== Proto-surrealism ==
By 1922 Angelika was alone and too ill to participate in art or political activities; she turned to drawing contemplative works and dream-scapes. The works that American Collector Katherine Dreier bought from the Karl Nierendorf Gallery in 1922 were proto-surrealistic and captured her isolation.

== Influence ==
Angelika's death at 23 touched many. Artists Max Ernst, Jankel Adler, Gottfried Brockmann, Marta Hegemann and Anton Raderscheidt commemorated her in art. Angelika Hoerle's works are in the collections of the Art Gallery of Ontario, Canada; the Museum Ludwig, Cologne, Germany; the Gerd Arntz Archive in the Hague, Netherlands, the Rhenish Archive for Artists’ Legacies, Bonn, Germany and in the Societe Anonyme Collection at New Haven, Connecticut, U.S.A. Her art has been in exhibitions in ten countries on three continents. She has inspired playwrights, poets, composers, novelists and art historians who continue to write about her.

== In popular culture ==
- Juhan Puhm, Angelika (Drawing Woman 1920), a play, the Performance House, Barrie, Ontario, 1988
- Angelika Littlefield, Angelika's Promise: a monologue play, Jackman Hall, Art Gallery of Ontario, Toronto, 2009
- Gunther Limburg. Heinrich und Angelika. Painting 2009. Cologne, Germany
- Ennio A. Paola, Comets and Shadows: a musical score, 2009. Novelist Ute Bales played Comets & Shadows with her readings in Künstlerhaus Schloss Balmoral (Bad Ems), Cabaret Voltaire (Zurich) and Simonskall, Germany. In February 2019 the piece premiered in a version for string quartet aboard Oceania, Marina, Bora, Bora, South Seas, Pacific Ocean with Quadrivium Quartet (Poland)
- David Annwn."Z206 For Angelika Hoerle", poem in Bela Fawr’s Cabaret, 2008. Annwn is an Anglo-Welsh poet and author.
- Ute Bales, Die Welt zerschlagen: Die Geschichte der Dada-Künstlerin Angelika Hoerle, a novel in German, 2016
- Ennio Paola, composer, The World Is Smashed | The World Is Shattered

== Exhibitions during her lifetime ==
- Kaltall Gemeinschaft, Simonskall, Eifel, Germany, June 1919
- Section D, Gesellschaft der Kuenste, Koelnischer Kunstverein, Cologne, 1919
- Gruppe Stupid, Hildeboldplatz, Cologne, ongoing 1919-1920
- Halbmonatsaustellung, Graphischen Kabinett Van den Berg & Co, Duesseldorf, 1920
- Erste Internationale Kunstaustellung Duesseldorf (Internationaler Kongress Fortschrittlicher Kuenstler), Tietz Department Store, May–June 1922
- Karl Nierendorf Neue Kunst Galerie, Cologne, 1922
- Unter Eigner Jury, Koelnischer Kunstverein, Cologne, October 1922
- Erste Allgemeine Deustsche Kunstausstellung der IAH (International Workers’ Aid Association) Moscow, St. Petersburg, Saratov, October 1922 (Angelika was dead at the time of the openings but took part in the preparation for this exhibition.)

== Exhibitions after Angelika Hoerle’s death ==
- Yale Societe Anonyme, Duesseldorf and Amsterdam, 1958–59
- Yale Societe Anonyme, St. Anselm's, New Hampshire, 1975
- Vom Dadamax zum Gruenguertel: Koeln in den 20er Jahren, Cologne Kunstverein, Cologne, 1975
- Dada and Surrealism Reviewed, Arts Council of Great Britain, London, U.K., 1975; also in Centre Pompidou, Paris, France, July–November 1978 and Berlin, Germany, 1978
- L’Altra Meta Dell’Avanguardia 1910-1940, Comune di Milano, Italy, Feb-May,1980; also in Rome 1980 and Stockholm, 1980-1981
- Angelika Hoerle 1899 - 1923, Koelnischer Kunstverein, Germany, 1981-1982
- The World According to Dada, Taipei Fine Arts Museum, Taipei, 1988
- The Dada Period in Cologne, Art Gallery of Ontario, Toronto, Canada, 1988-1989
- The Societe Anonyme: Modernism for America, Hammer Museum, Los Angeles 2006, Phillips Collection, Washington D.C. 2006–2007, Dallas Museum of Art, 2007
- Experiment Kalltalgemeinschaft 1919-1921, Simonskall, Germany, 2008
- Angelika Hoerle: the comet of cologne dada, Art Gallery of Ontario, Toronto, Canada 2009; Museum Ludwig, Cologne, Germany, 2009
- The Societe Anonyme: Modernism for America, Yale University Art Gallery, New Haven, Conn. 2012-2013
- Die Dada La Dada She Dada, Forum Schlossplatz, Aarau, Switzerland, 2014-2015
