= Paul Multhaupt =

German industrialist, art collector and patron of the arts

- Born: January 5, 1884; Lohennocken, Westphalia, Germany
- Died: January 16, 1933 (aged 49); Berlin, Germany
- Occupations: Industrialist, art collector, patron of the arts
- Years active: 1909–1931
- Employer: Schloemann AG Düsseldorf
- Known for: Chairman of Schloemann AG Düsseldorf; notable art collection

Paul Multhaupt (January 5, 1884 - January 16, 1933) was a German industrialist, art collector and patron of the arts.

== Life ==
Multhaupt was Chairman of the Board of Schloemann AG Düsseldorf (now Schloemann-Siemag AG) from 1909 to 1931. Founded in 1901 by Eduard Schloemann as Handelsgesellschaft Eduard Schloemann OHG, the company was originally involved in the sale of fittings and condensation pots, among other things. It had great success around 1908 with a new type of hydraulic quick-action control, which Eduard Schloemann was able to sell in large quantities.

Multhaupt joined Schloemann's company as an engineer in 1909. From 1910 onwards, he had a significant influence on technical development with the design of control systems for hydraulic presses. This was later followed by the construction of complete hydraulic press systems. After Schloemann's death, the company was transformed into a limited company under the management of Multhaupt and Ludwig Loewy. In 1915, a joint venture was founded with MAN for press construction. In 1920, the construction of rolling mills began. In 1921, the company was converted into an AG.

== Art collection ==
Multhaupt owned an extensive collection of artworks by renowned artists such as Heckel, Max Beckmann, Emil Nolde, Paul Klee, Marc Chagall, Campendonk, Räderscheidt, Vlaminck and Ernst Ludwig Kirchner. Multhaupt's collection was publicly exhibited at the Flechtheim Gallery in Düsseldorf in 1933 and the whereabouts of many are unknown.

Multhaupt supported Anton Räderscheidt during the creative period of “New Objectivity”.

== Death ==
Multhaupt committed suicide after Hitler came to power, taking his own life on January 16, 1933.

== Literature ==
- Hans-Günther Christ: Der Industrielle Paul Multhaupt und sein Wirken in Friedrichssegen, 1998.
