= Wilhelm Teuwen =

German stained glass artist (1908–1967)

Wilhelm Teuwen (16 August 1908 – 21 August 1967) was a German artist best known for his stained glass work.

== Biography ==
Teuwen was born on 16 August 1908 in Anrath and since 1923 studied at the art school in Krefeld. After graduation in 1929, he enrolled to Kunstakademie Düsseldorf. He studied there with Heinrich Campendonk and, after in 1933 Campendonk has been fired by the Nazis, with Heinrich Nauen, graduating in 1934. In Krefeld, he also met Johan Thorn Prikker, one of the pioneers of the modern stain glass, and this had an important influence on Teuwen's art.

In the end of the 1920s, the main medium used by Teuwen was woodcut, and he made prints in the style of German expressionism, but then he moved to stained glass. In 1932, he made his first big stain glass, the memorial to the fallen soldiers in World War I in Uedem.

Since 1933, with Hitler in power, Teuwen's art was not explicitly prohibited, however, the Nazis did not appreciate the style, and he has been excluded from the official art processes on many occasions. In 1937, he carried out the projects for the St. Remigius Church in Wittlaer and the Holy Cross Chapel in Vennheide.

In 1940, Teuwen was drafted to the military service and participated in World War II in France, Russia, Italy, and Czechoslovakia. He ended up as a prisoner of war and was released by the Americans in 1945.

In November 1946, Teuwen was asked to join the faculty of the Kölner Werkschulen, and till 1967 he taught there classes of stained glass. At the same time, he got many orders to replace glass windows in the Lowe Rhine area which were destroyed during World War II, both in churches and in civil buildings. In particular, he designed windows for Cologne Cathedral and St. Gereon's Basilica, as well as for the Church of St. Elisabeth in Essen-Frohnhausen. In the 1950s, Teuwen, still busy with stained glass, returned to painting and woodcut. His work of this decade demonstrates increasing influence of Italian Renaissance, most notably Michelangelo. In 1957, his first personal exhibition was held in Clemens-Sels-Museum in Neuss.

Wilhelm Teuwen died on 21 August 1967 in Cologne.

== Legacy ==
In 2004, the city of Viersen named a street (Wilhelm-Teuwen-Straße) after Wilhelm Teuwen. There is also a street with this name in Willich, the city Anrath was merged in.
