= Stupid (art movement) =

German group of constructivist artists

Stupid was a short-lived grouping of constructivist artists, formed in Cologne in 1919. The founding members were Willy Fick, Heinrich Hoerle, Angelika Hoerle, Anton Räderscheidt, Marta Hegemann, and Franz Wilhelm Seiwert.

== Political goals ==
The Stupid group aimed to address sociopolitical issues through an art of proletarian character. Seiwert and Räderscheidt had previously been active in the Cologne Dada scene, along with Max Ernst. Ernst later described Stupid as "a secession from Cologne Dada. As far as Hoerle and especially Seiwert were concerned, Dada's activities were aesthetically too radical and socially not concrete enough". Seiwert described the group's esthetic: "We are attempting to be so clear that everyone will be able to understand us."

== Disbanding ==
Räderscheidt's studio was their base of operations, but by 1920 he had abandoned the constructivist style. The group exhibited together and issued a publication, "Stupid 1", before disbanding. Many of the members joined the Cologne Progressives group.
