= Kölner Werkschulen =

Former art school in Cologne, Germany

The Kölner Werkschulen (Cologne Academy of Fine and Applied Arts), formerly Cologne Art and Craft Schools, was a university in Cologne training artists in visual arts, architecture and design from 1926 to 1971.

== History ==
=== Origins ===
The origins of the Kölner Werkschulen can be found in the Sunday school established by the painter Egidius Mengelberg in 1822 at the Jesuit buildings. This was incorporated into the "Royal Prussian Provincial Vocational School Cologne" founded in 1833. In 1910 Emil Thormählen came to Cologne to develop a School of Applied Arts as part of the German Werkbund movement. However his plans to build a new school building had to be postponed due to the outbreak of war in 1914. When the plans could not be taken forward immediately after the war, Thormählen retired November 1919. In April 1924, the architect Martin Elsaesser was the director of the school and designed a "Red House", an expressionist, red brick building on Ubierring 40.

=== 1926–1933 ===
In 1926 the school was reorganized and the Mayor Konrad Adenauer, designated it the "Cologne Werkschulen", in accordance with the Bauhaus point of view. He said, "Bonn is for science (= University) and Dusseldorf for Art (= Academy) but in Cologne I want both." Adenauer got his way by 1919 with the University of Cologne, and in 1924 with his Cologne art school (Werkschulen), with both buildings almost within sight of each other.

=== 1933–1945 ===
Under the rule of the NSDAP the German Werkbund movement was dissolved and the name of the Werkschulen was changed to Kölner Meisterschule (Cologne Master School). The new director Karl Berthold introduced the anti-semitic ideology of Hitler.

== Directors ==
- 1879–1906: Friedrich Romberg, engineer
- 1906–1910: Gustav Halmhuber, architect and painter
- 1910–1919, Emil Thormählen, painter and architect
- 1920–1926: Martin Elsässer, architect
- 1926–1931: Richard Riemerschmid, painter, architect and designer
- 1931–1933: Karl With, art historian
- 1933–1945: Karl Berthold, goldsmith
- 1946–1957: August Hoff, art historian
- 1958–1965: Friedrich Vordemberge, painter
- 1965–1971: Werner Schriefers, painter and designer

== Lecturers ==
=== Architecture and interior design ===
- Martin Elsaesser (1920–1925)
- Dominikus Böhm (1926–1934/1947–1953)
- Richard Riemerschmid (1926–1931)
- Stefan Leuer (1954–1978)
- Georg Lünenborg (1948–1967)
- Gernot Lucas (1969–2003)
- Wolf Nöhren (1970–1973)

=== Painting ===
- Johan Thorn Prikker (1926–1932)
- Friedrich Ahlers-Hestermann (1928–1933)
- Richard Seewald (1924–1931)
- Otto Gerster (1939–1972)
- Stefan Wewerka (1975–1993)
- Daniel Spoerri (1978–1982)
- Hans Rolf Maria Koller (1963–1973)
- Dieter Kraemer (1963–1993)
- Friedrich Vordemberge (1946–1976)
- Dieter Horký (1971–1993)
- Karl Marx (1959–1986)
- Wilhelm Teuwen (1946–1967)
- Elisabeth Vary (1964–1970–1993)
- Werner Schriefers (1965–1989)
- Gerhard Kadow (1967–1974)
- Franz Dank (1961–1993)
- Hubert Schaffmeister (1952–1976)

=== Sculpture and plastic arts ===
- Anton Berger (1964–1989)
- Hans Karl Burgeff (1968–1988)
- Ludwig Gies (1950–1962)
- Georg Grasegger (1901–1927)
- Josef Jaekel (1947–1975)
- Dorkas Reinacher-Härlin (1924–1929)
- Titus Reinarz (1981–1992)
- Kurt Schwippert (1963–1968)
- Wolfgang Wallner (1912–1950)
- Hans Wissel (1925–1933)

=== Graphic design ===
- Richard Riemerschmid (1926–1931)
- Jakob Erbar (1926–1933)
- Heinrich Hußmann (1928–1965)
- Alfred Will (1929–1933/1946–1971)
- Anton Wolff (1942–1976)
- Jürgen Klauke (1970–1975)
- Heinz Edelmann (1976–1978)

=== Goldsmithing ===
- Ernst Riegel (1913–1933)
- Elisabeth Treskow (1948–1964)

=== Photography ===
- Arno Jansen (1965–2003)

=== Art history ===
- Wilhelm Lotz
- Karl With (1925–1928/1931–1933)
- August Hoff (1946–1957)

=== Ceramics and industrial design ===
- Dorkas Reinacher-Härlin (1924–1929)
- Ludwig König (1930–1933)
- Georg Roth (1924–1964)
- Walter Maria Kersting (1927–1932)
- Herbert Schultes (1968–1970)

=== Guest lecturers ===
- Bazon Brock (art theory)
- Birgit Hein (film)
- Wulf Herzogenrath (art settlement)
- Friedrich Wolfram Heubach (psychology)
- Jörg Immendorff (painting)
- Leo Kofler (sociology)
- Ingo Kümmel (art dealing)
- Ulrike Rosenbach (video action)
- Günter Karl Friedrich Schwichtenberg (cybernetics)

== Students ==
=== Architecture ===
- Heinz Bienefeld
- Johannes Krahn

=== Painting ===
- Ingeborg Drews
- Hellmuth Eichner
- Joseph Fassbender
- Edvard Frank
- Jürgen Hans Grümmer
- Hildegard Grunert
- Dieter Horký
- Ulla Horký
- Ida Köhne
- Jean Lessenich
- Joseph Mader
- Wolfgang Niedecken
- Erwin und Helmut Plönes
- Anton Räderscheidt
- Wolfgang Schulte
- Franz Wilhelm Seiwert
- Udo Sellbach
- Wolfgang Siemens
- Helga Tiemann
- Rosemarie Trockel
- Günther Umberg
- Kurt Wegner
- Willy Weyres
- Paul Wieghardt

=== Sculpture / plastic arts ===
- Georg J. Ahrens
- Raimund Böll
- Kurt-Wolf von Borries
- Hilde Broër
- Hubert Bruhs
- Heinz Feuerborn
- Peter Raacke
- Titus Reinarz
- Wolfgang Reuter
- Ulrich Rückriem
- Gretel Schulte-Hostedde

=== Graphic design ===
- Will Burtin
- Thomas F. Fischer
- Walter Hanel
- Jürgen Klauke
- Maurilio Minuzzi
- Eduard Prüssen
- Maf Räderscheidt
- Konrad Schaefer
- Helmut Tollmann
- Leo N Keil

=== Photography ===
- Chargesheimer
- Fritz Gruber
- Candida Höfer
- Burkhard Jüttner
- Raoul Ubac
