= Gottfried Brockmann =

German painter (1903–1983)

Gottfried Waldemar Brockmann
- Born: 19 November 1903; Cologne, German Empire
- Died: 9 July 1983 (aged 79); Kiel, West Germany
- Education: Düsseldorf Art Academy
- Employer: Muthesius Academy of Art
- Movement: Political Constructivism, Cologne Progressives
- Spouse: Marianne Reunert
- Father: Hans Waldemar Brockmann

Gottfried Waldemar Brockmann (1903 – 1983) was a German artist, educator, publisher, and served as a cultural advisor for the city of Kiel, Germany. He taught at Muthesius Academy of Art in Kiel.

== Early life and education ==
Gottfried Brockmann was born on 19 November 1903 in the Lindenthal district in Cologne, Germany. He was the son of painter Hans Waldemar Brockmann.

He did a two-year apprenticeship in architecture, followed by a two-year apprenticeship in decorative painting which he completed in 1922. Between 1922 and 1925, he was active within the Cologne Progressives movement.

Brockmann attended Düsseldorf Art Academy (German: Kunstakademie Düsseldorf) from 1926 to 1932, studying under Heinrich Campendonk.

== Career ==
In the early 1930s, he was a member of the board of the "Rheinische Sezession", which emerged from the Young Rhineland. In 1932, he married sculptor Marianne Reunert. He started teaching the foundation courses at Düsseldorf Art Academy, after graduation in 1932.

As the National Socialists gained power in 1933, during this time Brockmann joined the German Communist Party (KPD). The Düsseldorf Art Academy director Walter Kaesbach was removed from his office by the National Socialists. Brockmann disagreed with the National Socialists changes, he resisted and spoke out against the replacement director, he was threatened. Eventually he and his wife fled, moving to Berlin to stay with his parents in hiding. While in Berlin, he worked at the United State Schools of Fine and Applied Arts (German: Vereinigten Staatsschulen für Freie und Angewandte Kunst), teaching art conservation courses.

From 1942 to 1945, Brockmann joined the German military during World War II, and the Nazi regime. In 1946, he was released after being captured by the American military.

After World War II, Brockmann settled in Hof an der Saale and ran a book publishing company. In 1952, the Brockmann family moved to Kiel, West Germany; first working as a cultural advisor to the city and later teaching at Muthesius Art Academy.

== Death and legacy ==
Brockmann died on 9 July 1983 in Kiel, at the age of 79.

Since 1985, the city of Kiel has awarded the Gottfried Brockmann Prize, named after him. Brockmann's work can be found in various public museum collections including Museum of Modern Art (MoMA), Berlinische Galerie, Staatliche Kunstsammlungen Dresden, and others.

== Bibliography ==
=== Exhibition catalogs ===
- Gottfried Brockmann (in Italian). Milan, Italy: Galleria del Levante. 1972.
- Thiele, Gernot; Nievers, Knut, eds. (1995). Gottfried Brockmann, Bild und Überzeitlichkeit. Stadtgalerie im Sophienhof. Ostfildern-Ruit, Germany: Hatje. ISBN 978-3-7757-0599-8.
- Daniel Hörner; Flora Hitzing; Kathrin Hoffmann; Kerstin Liebst; Leunora Salihu; Matthias Krause; Pascal Maier; Peter Kruska; Thomas Judisch; Yukari Kosakai (2007). Gottfried Brockmann Preis 2007. Kiel, Germany: Landeshauptstadt. ISBN 978-3-927979-72-7.

== See also ==
- List of German painters
