= Jürgen Klauke =

German artist

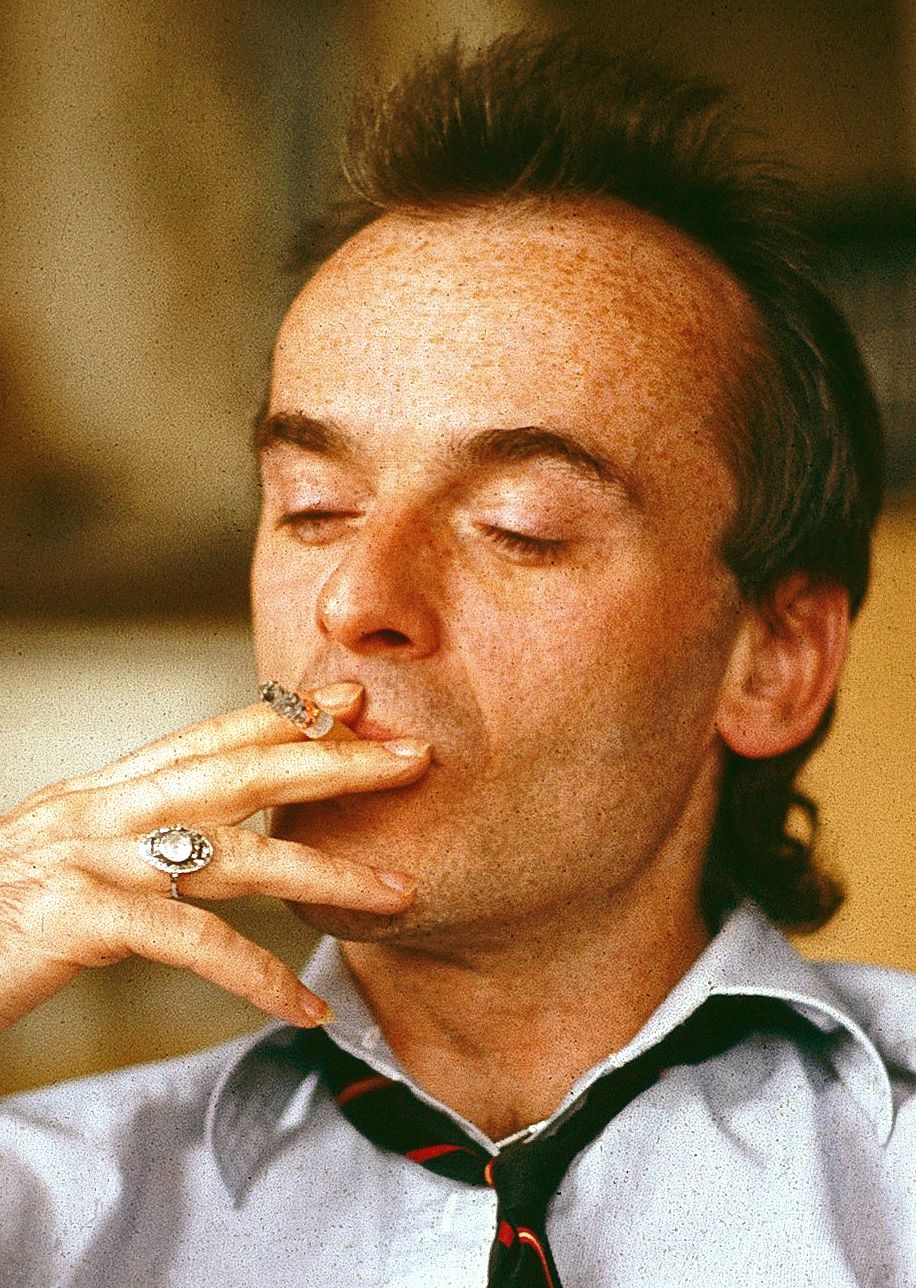
Jürgen Klauke

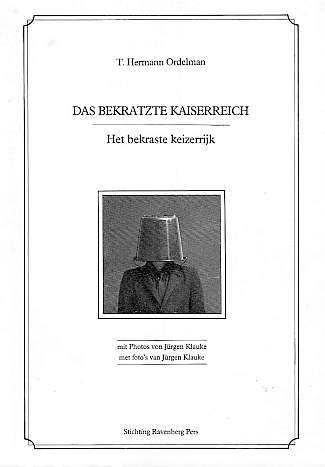
Cover of "Das Bekratzte Kaiserreich"

Jürgen Klauke (born 6 September 1943) is a German artist. Beginning in the 1960s, he used his own body as a subject of his photographs. He also experimented with minimalism and surrealism. The ZKM in Karlsruhe exhibits his work. Since 1968 he lives and works in Cologne.

Klauke was born in Kliding near Cochem, about 70 kilometers southwest of Koblenz, in what became the postwar West German state of Rhineland-Palatinate. He studied graphic arts at the Kölner Werkschulen from 1964 to 1970; toward the end of his studies, he began focusing on photography as a medium of artistic expression.

From 1994 to 2008 Klauke was professor of photography at the Kunsthochschule für Medien (Academy of Media Arts), in Cologne.

In January–February 2016 Klauke had his first solo gallery exhibition in New York City; the show, Jürgen Klauke, Transformer: Photoworks from the 1970s, at Koenig & Clinton, included photographic series completed between 1970 and 1976, primarily featuring costumed and androgynous images of the artist.
