= Wolfgang Siemens =

German painter

- Born: 4 February 1945; Thüringen
- Died: 29 February 2016 (aged 71)

Wolfgang Siemens (4 February 1945 – died 29 February 2016) was a German painter.

== Life ==
Siemens was born on 4 February 1945 Thüringen, Germany. In 1961, he began to study painting under Friedrich Vordemberge at the Kölner Werkschulen and later under Karl Marx as a master student of Vordemberge.

In 1970 his exhibition at the Kölner Josef-Haubrich-Kunsthalle made him more widely known. From 1969 to 1979 Siemens also taught art at a secondary school in Cologne. In 1979 he turned exclusively to painting. In 1980 he had a solo exhibition in New York City. Until 1984 he lived and worked with short breaks in Paris, the south of France and Morocco.

In 1984 the Bundesverband Bildender Künstler created a retrospective display of Siemens' artwork. Then in 1986 he suffered a long-lasting personal and artistic crisis. The change in the environment and the death of his father left him doubting his painting. He destroyed all the works he still had in his possession.

In 1990 Siemens began to paint people. He currently lives and works in Cologne.

Siemens died on the leap day of 2016, 25 days after 71st birthday.

== Literature ==
- Safiriou, Georgios O. (2000). Siemens Der Maler/The Painter. Cologne: WISON Verlag. ISBN 3-87951-163-2.
- Wolfgang, Siemens (1984). Malerei 1984. Cologne.
