= Elisabeth Treskow =

German goldsmith and jewellery designer

Elisabeth Treskow (1898–1992) was a German goldsmith and jewellery designer, one of the earliest professional women in the field. After serving an apprenticeship under Karl Rothmüller in Munich, in 1923 she worked with the bookbinder Frida Schoy in the artists' colony in the Margarethenhöhe district of Essen. Around 1930, she rediscovered the Etruscan art of granulation and went on to win several first prizes in Germany as well as a Gold Medal at the 1937 Paris World Fair. Her work is in the collections of museums in Germany and abroad, including London's Victoria & Albert Museum and Cologne's Museum für Angewandte Kunst.

== Early life and education ==
Born in Bochum on 20 August 1898, Elisabeth Treskow was the daughter of the pharmacist Max Treskow and his wife Hedwig. After attending the classes given by Karl Ernst Osthaus in Hagen, she successfully completed silversmith courses in Schwäbisch Gmünd (1917) and Munich (1918). After an apprenticeship under Karl Rothmüller of Munich, she qualified as a journeyman in 1918.

Returning to Bochum, she worked in a studio she established in her parents' home. In 1923, she joined the artists' colony in Margaretenhöhe where she worked with the bookbinder Frida Schoy. In 1927, she made a study trip to Paris where she was inspired by the medieval jewellery displayed in the Musée Cluny.

== Career ==
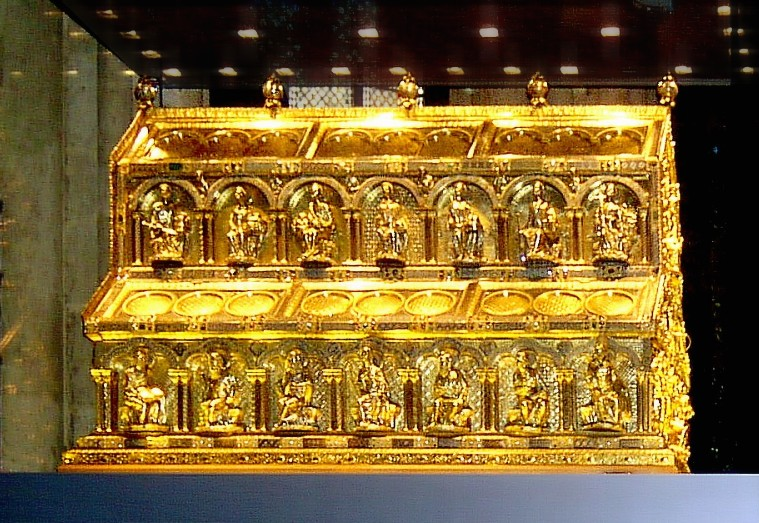
Shrine of the Three Kings, Cologne, restored by Elisabeth Treslow in 1948

When business suffered as a result of the economic crisis at the beginning of the 1930s, Treskow carefully examined the granulation technique used by the Etruscans in the first millennium B.C. It consisted of applying tiny granules of gold to a metal base. Treskow mastered the technique, creating countless pieces of jewellery and publicizing her approach through lectures and publications. Such was the effect of her granulation, she was able to work without gemstones, creating diminutive friezes of hunting scenes, flowers or the signs of the Zodiac. Her creations Ehrenring (1933), Schmuckkreuz (1935) and Liebesring (1936) all won first prizes from the Gesellschaft für Goldschmiedekunst (Association for Goldsmiths' Art) in Berlin. In 1937, she was awarded the gold medal at the Paris World Fair while in 1938 she became the first woman to win the Ring of Honour from the Association for Goldsmiths' Art.

After the end of the Second World War, Treskow was appointed head of the goldsmith class at the re-established Cologne Academy of Fine and Applied Arts where she remained until her retirement in 1964. She was promoted to the rank of professor in 1956, the first goldsmith in Germany to make the grade. Of particular note during the post-war period was her restoration of the Shrine of the Three Kings in Cologne Cathedral.

In later life, she created jewellery with antique stones and coins, finding inspiration in medieval Christianity. She went on to win the Bavarian State Prize (1963), the State Prize of North Rhine-Westphalia (1967) and the Pro Ecclesia et Pontifice awarded by Pope Paul VI. In 1964, for her contributions to jewellery she was awarded the Grand Federal Service Cross. In 1971, Treskow moved into an old people's home in Brühl where she continued to design items to be made by her students. In 1991, the Cologne Museum of Applied Art presented a retrospective exhibition of her work.

Elisabeth Treskow died in Brühl on 6 October 1992.
