= Cologne Progressives =

Art movement in 1920s-30s Germany

The Cologne Progressives was an art movement and were an informal group of artists based in the Cologne and Düsseldorf area of Germany. They came together following the First World War and participated in the radical workers' movement.

== History ==
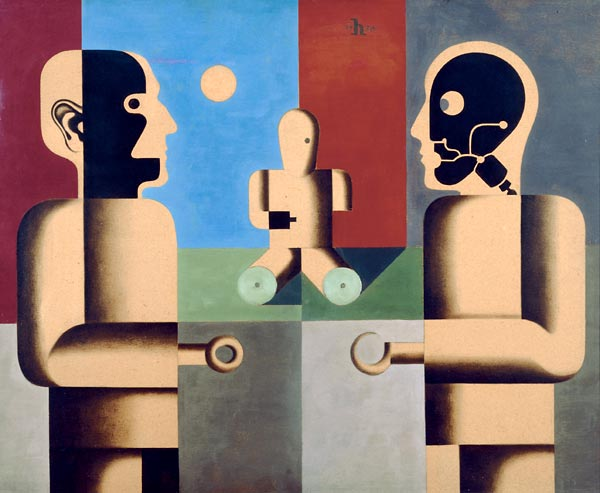
Heinrich Hoerle, Monument to the Unknown Protheses (1930)

The group was founded by Gerd Arntz, Heinrich Hoerle and Franz Wilhelm Seiwert. The group related their attitude to art to their political activism. As Wieland Schmied put it, they "sought to combine constructivism and objectivity, geometry and object, the general and the particular, avant-garde conviction and political engagement, and which perhaps approximated most to the forward looking of New Objectivity [...] ". They originated Figurative Constructivism.

Other artists and designers associated with this group include Wilhelm Kleinert, Marta Hegemann, Angelika Hoerle, Anton Räderscheidt, and Gottfried Brockmann. Many members had come from the Stupid (art movement).

== Key concepts ==
=== Reversibility ===
This concept comes from their concern not merely to communicate social and political necessities, but also to ensure that their artworks could be turned toward the viewers sensible reality and become tenable as an argument. This is tied to their political commitment to proletarian culture in the specific context of the Rhineland during the tumults of the 1920s.

== See also ==
- Stupid (art movement)
