= Marta Hegemann =

German artist (1894–1970)

- Portrait of Hegemann by August Sander c. 1925
- Born: 14 February 1894; Düsseldorf, German Empire
- Died: 28 January 1970 (aged 75); Cologne, West Germany
- Known for: Painting
- Movement: Expressionism, Dada, Constructivism, New Objectivity

Marta Hegemann (14 February 1894 – 28 January 1970) was a German artist associated with the Dada movement and with the Cologne Progressives. She was a founding member of the Cologne art group Stupid.

== Life ==
Hegemann was born in Düsseldorf and studied art in Cologne, where she became part of a circle of Dadaists that included such artists as Heinrich Hoerle, Angelika Hoerle, and Anton Räderscheidt. In 1912 she moved to Dusseldorf for further study, returning to Cologne afterwards to teach art. She stopped teaching art after a few years to concentrate on her own artwork. In 1918 she married Räderscheidt, and they had two sons, Johann and Karl-Anton.

In 1919, Hegemann was involved with developing a Cologne Dada group and its offshoot Stupid with Anton and her friend Angelika Hoerle. She later moved away from Dadaism and became a key member of the Cologne Progressives, although she was less politically active than many members of this group. By the 1920s, Hegemann had become one of the most respected avant-garde artists in Cologne and her work was exhibited widely. Her paintings featured surreal compositions executed in a style that combined elements of Dadaism, Constructivism, and New Objectivity. With the rise of Nazism, her career began to decline. She and her family moved to Rome for three years (1933–36), and in 1937 she and Anton separated.

The Nazis confiscated and destroyed a good deal of her work, terming it "degenerate art," and more work was lost in the chaos of World War II. After the war, Hegemann was unable to rebuild her career. She died of heart disease in Cologne, in 1970.

A selection of her work is on public display in the Museum Ludwig in Cologne.

Numerous photographs of Hegemann, her work, and her studio were taken by August Sander. One image shows Hegemann with several of her iconic motifs (birds, a heart) painted on one side of her face.
