= Heinrich Campendonk =

German painter

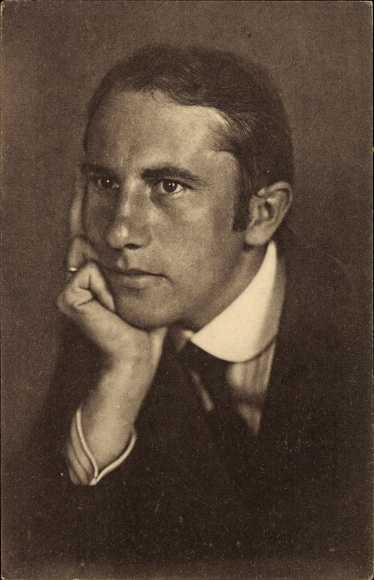
Heinrich Campendonk in 1916

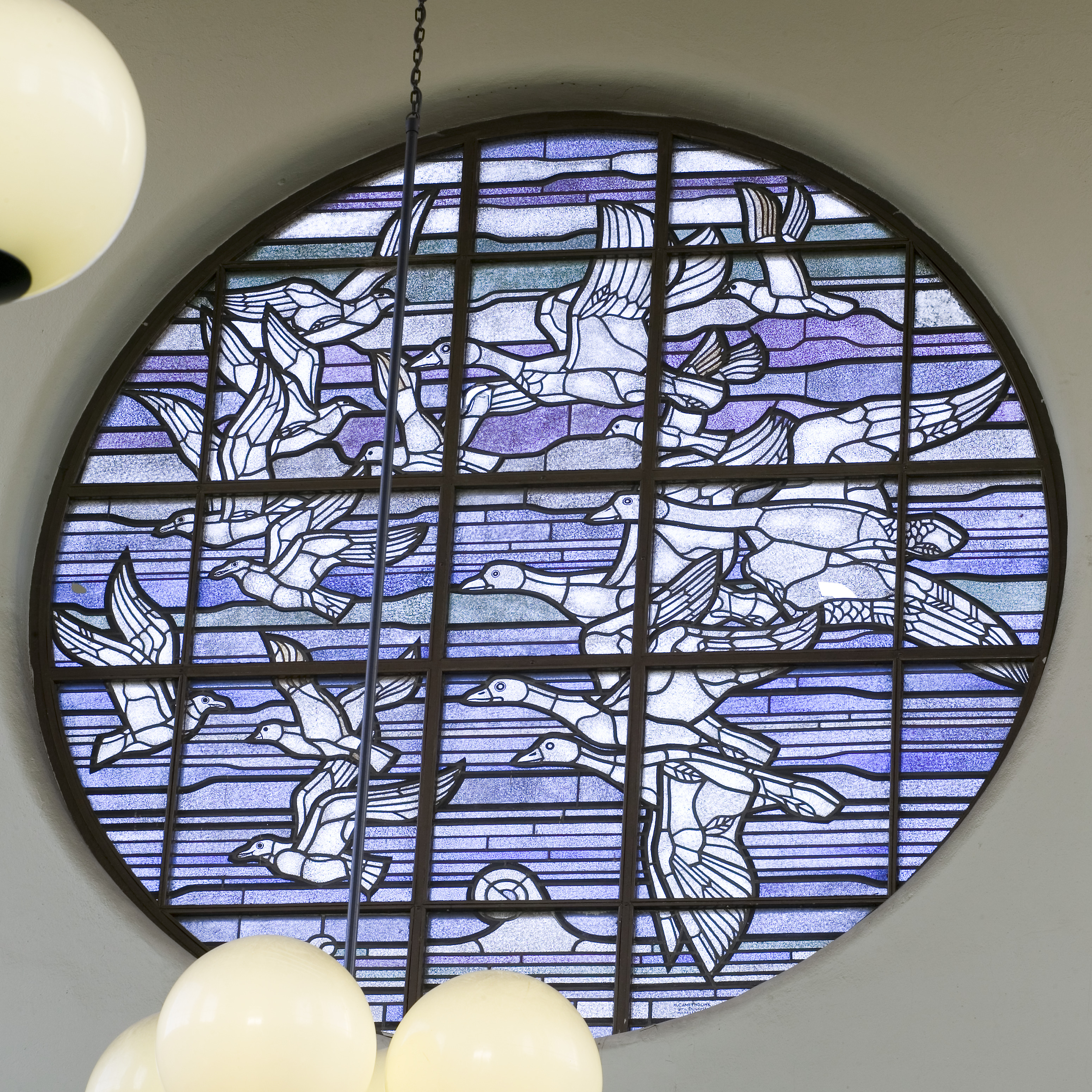
Amsterdam Muiderpoort railway station

Heinrich Mathias Ernst Campendonk (3 November 1889 – 9 May 1957) was a painter and graphic designer born in Germany who became a naturalized Dutch citizen.

== Life ==
Campendonk was born in Krefeld, Kingdom of Prussia, German Empire. He was the son of a textile merchant, and served a textile apprenticeship until 1905. From 1905 to 1909, he received artistic education from Johan Thorn Prikker at the Handwerker- und Kunstgewerbeschule in Krefeld, a progressive school for arts and crafts. He became friends with Helmuth Macke, August Macke, Wilhelm Wieger, Franz Marc and Paul Klee during this time.

He was a member of the Der Blaue Reiter group from 1911 to 1912.

In the 1930s, Campendonk taught at the Kunstakademie Düsseldorf. In particular, Wilhelm Teuwen was his student there and also an assistant helping Campendonk with the production of stained glass. When the Nazi regime came to power in 1933, he was among the many modernists condemned as degenerate artists, and prohibited from exhibiting, as well as fired from the Academy. He moved to the Netherlands, where he spent the rest of his life working at the Rijksakademie in Amsterdam, first teaching Decorative Art, printmaking and stained-glass, then as the Academy Director. He died as a naturalized Dutchman on 9 May 1957 in Amsterdam.

== Literature ==
- Gisela Geiger: Heinrich Campendonk. The Great Masters of Art, Hirmer Publishers, Munich 2022, ISBN 978-3-7774-4084-2

== See also ==
- List of German painters
