= Franz Wilhelm Seiwert =

German painter

Franz Wilhelm Seiwert (March 9, 1894 – July 3, 1933) was a German painter and sculptor in a constructivist style. He was also politically active as a communist making significant contributions, both graphic and theoretical to Die Aktion.

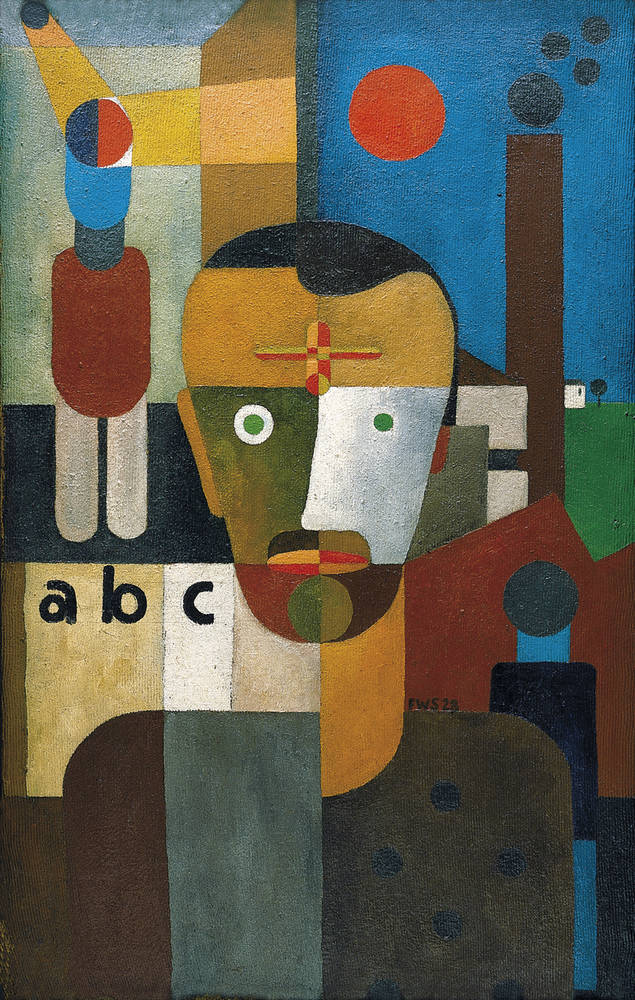
Selbstbildnis (Self-portrait) by Franz Wilhelm Seiwert, 1928, oil on canvas, 79 x 50 cm, Von der Heydt-Museum, Wuppertal

Seiwert was born in Cologne. He was seriously burned in 1901, at the age of seven, in an experimental radiological treatment. As a result, he subsequently lived with the fear that his life would be short.

He studied from 1910 to 1914 at the Cologne School of Arts and Crafts. In 1919 he met Max Ernst and took part in Dada activities. He was invited to exhibit in the large Dada exhibit in Cologne but withdrew at the last moment. In that same year he formed the Stupid group which included Heinrich Hoerle and Anton Räderscheidt. According to Ernst, "Stupid was a secession from Cologne Dada. As far as Hoerle and especially Seiwert were concerned, Dada's activities were aesthetically too radical and socially not concrete enough".

His first large solo exhibition was in Cologne at the Kunstverein in 1923, and by the mid-1920s he was a leader of the "Group of Progressive Artists", who sought to reconcile constructivism with realism while expressing radical political views. In 1929 he founded the magazine "a-z", a journal of progressive art. This became a vehicle for the exposition of Figurative Constructivism.

== Politics ==
Seiwert was actively involved in the international discussions concerning proletarian culture during the revolutionary upsurge following the First World War. "Throw out the old false idols! In the name of the coming proletarian culture"

Seiwert was the leading theorist of Figurative Constructivism describing its origins as "From the expressionist-cubist art-form abstract constructivism was developed, which in turn led into Figurative Constructivism".

When Hitler came to power in 1933, Seiwert briefly fled to the mountain range Siebengebirge, but his health was badly deteriorating, and friends brought him back to Cologne, where he died on July 3, 1933.

== Contributions to Die Aktion ==
Die Aktion ran from 1911-1932. Seiwert made 43 contributions (see Wikisource (German language)):

=== Images ===
In the two years from 1917 to 1919 Seiwert had seven untitled woodcuts published in Die Aktion.

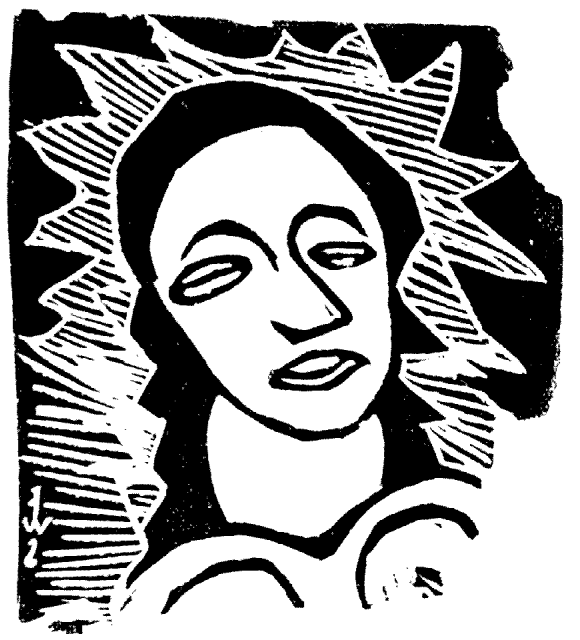
8 September 1917,

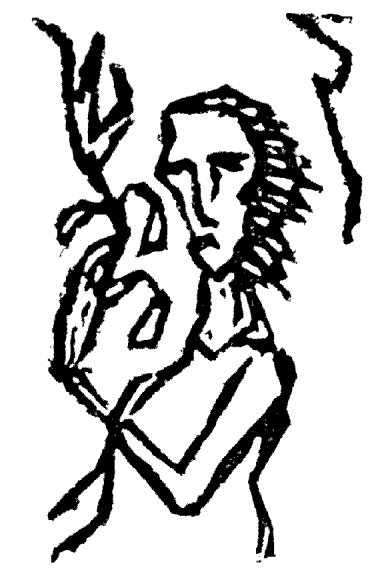
9 February 1918,

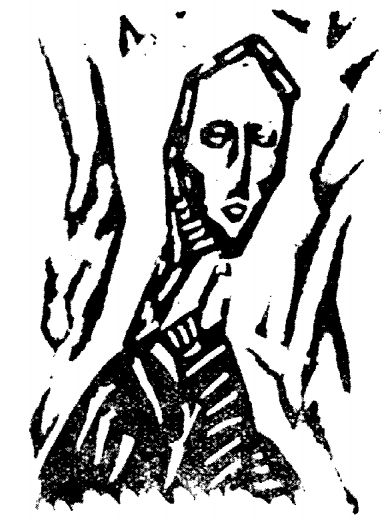
29 June 1918,

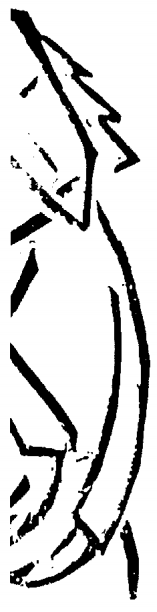
5 October 1918,

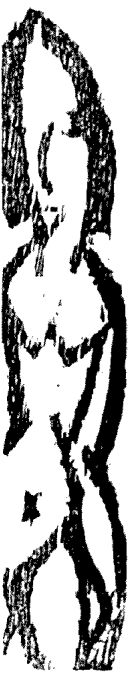
5 October 1918,

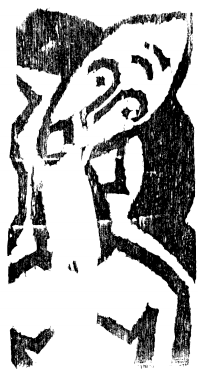
19 April 1919,

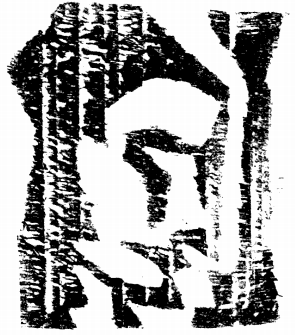
24 May 1919,

=== Articles ===
1. (1919a) "Eine Osterpredigt" (An Easter Sermon), Die Aktion, No. 14/15, 19 April 1919, p. 205–207
2. (1920a) "Tuet Bekenntnis, fordert Bekenntnis" (Start commitment, urge commitment), Die Aktion, Vol. 10, No. 7/8, 21 February 1920, p. 110–1
3. (1920b) "Das Loch in Rubens Schinken" (The hole in Rubens Ham), Die Aktion, Vol. 10, No. 29/30, 24 July 1920, p. 418–319
4. (1920c) "Worum handelt es sich?" (What's it about?), Die Aktion, Vol. 10, No. 37/38, 18. September 1920, p. 514
5. (1920d) "Es kommt auf das Fundament an" (It depends on the fundamentals), Die Aktion, Vol. 10, No. 43/44, 30. October 1920, p. 613–615
6. (1920e) "Aufbau der Proletarischen Kultur" (The Structure of the Proletarian Cultural), Die Aktion, Vol. 10, No. 51/52, 25 December 1920, p. 719–724
7. (1921a) "Gesellschaft und Prostitution", Die Aktion, No. 9/10, 5. March 1921, p. 134–136
8. (1921b) "Offener Brief an den Genossen Bogdanow" (Open Letter to Comrade Bogdanov), Die Aktion, No. 27/28, 9 July 1921, p. 373–374
9. (1921c) "Das Leben des Proleten" (The Life of the Proletarians), Die Aktion, No. 51/52, 25 December 1921, p. 721–722
10. (1922a) "Die Entwicklung der kommunistischen Bewegung in Deutschland" (The Development of the Communist Movement in Germany), Die Aktion, No. 39/40, 15 October 1922, p. 551–554
11. (192?)
12. (192?)
13. (192?) . . .
