= Heinrich Hoerle =

German constructivist artist

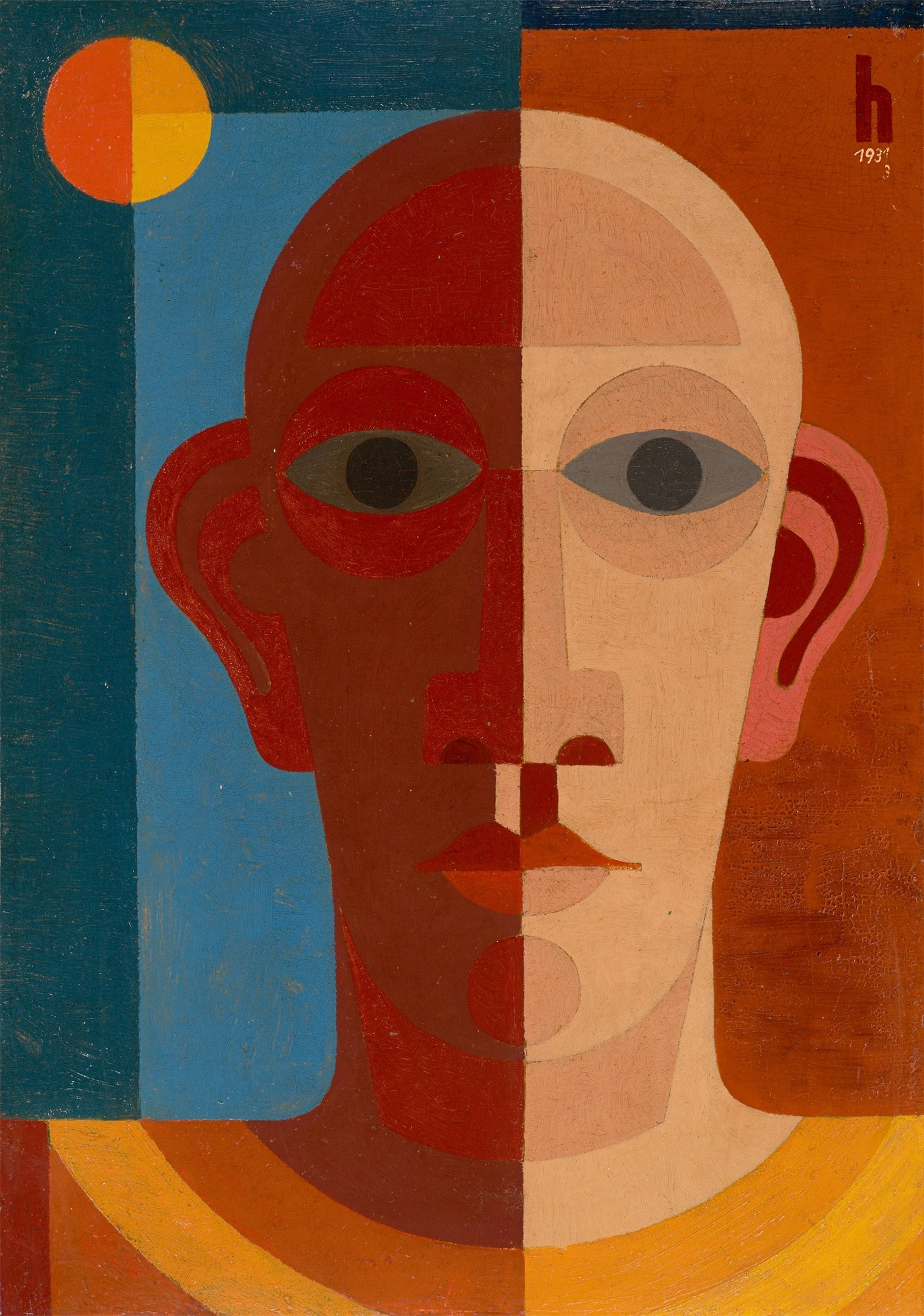
Heinrich Hoerle Selfportrait

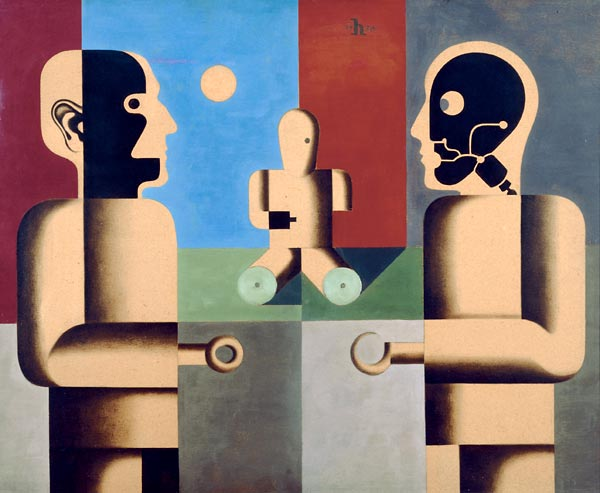
Denkmal der unbekannten Prothesen, 1930, oil on cardboard, 70 x 85 cm. Von der Heydt-Museum, Wuppertal

Heinrich Hoerle (1 September 1895 – 7 July 1936) was a German constructivist artist of the New Objectivity movement.

Hoerle was born in Cologne. He studied at the Cologne School of Arts and Crafts but was mostly self-taught as an artist. After military service in World War I he met Franz Wilhelm Seiwert in 1919 and worked with him on the journal Ventilator. Together with his wife Angelika (1899–1923), Hoerle became active in the Cologne Dada scene. He co-founded the artists' group Stupid, and in 1920 he published the Krüppelmappe (Cripples Portfolio). Hoerle's work retained a certain dour absurdism after he adopted a figurative constructivist style influenced by the Russians Vladimir Tatlin and El Lissitzky, by Fernand Léger, and by the Dutch movement De Stijl. His paintings feature generic-looking figures, presented in strict profile or in stiff, frontal poses.

In 1929 he began collaboration with Seiwert and Walter Stern on the publication of "a-z", the journal of the Cologne Progressives art group. He was among the many German artists whose works were condemned as degenerate art when the Nazis took power in 1933. He died in Cologne in 1936 at the age of 40.

Public collections holding works by Heinrich Hoerle include Museum Ludwig, Cologne; Kölnisches Stadtmuseum; Stadtmuseum Düsseldorf; The Von der Heydt Museum in Wuppertal; and the Busch-Reisinger Museum in Cambridge, Massachusetts.
