= Anton Räderscheidt =

German artist (1892–1970)

- Born: 11 October 1892; Cologne, German Empire
- Died: 8 March 1970 (aged 77); Cologne, West Germany
- Known for: Painting
- Movement: Expressionism, Dada, Constructivism, New Objectivity, Magic realism

Anton Räderscheidt (11 October 1892 – 8 March 1970) was a German painter who was a leading figure of the New Objectivity.

== Life and career ==
Räderscheidt was born in Cologne. His father was a schoolmaster who also wrote poetry. From 1910 to 1914, Räderscheidt studied at the Academy of Düsseldorf. He was severely wounded in the First World War, during which he fought at Verdun. After the war he returned to Cologne, where in 1919 he cofounded the artists' group Stupid with other members of the local constructivist and Dada scene. The group was short-lived, as Räderscheidt was by 1920 abandoning constructivism for a magic realist style. In 1925 he participated in the Neue Sachlichkeit ("New Objectivity") exhibition at the Mannheim Kunsthalle.

Many of the works Räderscheidt produced in the 1920s depict a stiffly posed, isolated couple that usually bear the features of Räderscheidt and his wife, the painter Marta Hegemann. The influence of metaphysical art is apparent in the way the mannequin-like figures stand detached from their environment and from each other. A pervasive theme is the incompatibility of the sexes, according to the art historian Dennis Crockett. Few of Räderscheidt's works from this era survive, because most of them were either seized by the Nazis as degenerate art and destroyed, or were destroyed in Allied bombing raids. His work was also part of the painting event in the art competition at the 1932 Summer Olympics.

His marriage to Marta ended in 1933. From 1934 to 1935 he lived in Berlin. He fled to France in 1936, and settled in Paris, where his work became more colorful, curvilinear and rhythmic. He was interned by the occupation authorities in 1940, but he escaped to Switzerland. In 1949 he returned to Cologne and resumed his work, producing many paintings of horses shortly before adopting an abstract style in 1957.

Räderscheidt was to return to the themes of his earlier work in some of his paintings of the 1960s. After suffering a stroke in 1967, he had to relearn the act of painting. He produced a penetrating series of self-portraits in gouache in the final years of his life. Anton Räderscheidt died in Cologne in 1970.
