= Rhein =

Rhein may refer to:

== Places ==
- Rhine, a major river in Europe (German: Rhein)
- Rhein, a village in the municipality of Morsbach in North Rhine-Westphalia, Germany
- Rhein (Ostpreussen), a former name of the town Ryn in Poland
- Rhein, Saskatchewan, a village within the Rural Municipality of Wallace No. 243 in Canada

== Ships ==
- SMS Rhein, an 1871 steam-powered ironclad monitor of the German Imperial Navy
- SS Rhein (1899), an ocean liner for North German Lloyd
- Rhein (A513), a modern German replenishment ship

== People ==
- Eduard Rhein (1900–1993), German inventor, publisher and author
- Monika Rhein, German oceanographer
- Ralph Rhein (born 1965), Swiss slalom canoer
- Rhein Amacher, walk-on football player for 2008 football season; see 2008 Oregon Ducks football team
- Torben Rhein (born 2003), German football player

== Photographs ==
- Rhein (1996), a photograph created by Andreas Gursky
- Rhein II (1999), a photograph created by Andreas Gursky

== Other uses ==
- Rhein (molecule), a substance in the anthraquinone group found in rhubarb

== See also ==
- Rhein Fire (NFL Europe), a defunct professional American football team in NFL Europe
- Rheintal, the Rhine Valley
- Rhain (disambiguation)
