= 99 Cent II Diptychon =

Photograph by Andreas Gurksy

- Artist: Andreas Gursky
- Year: 2001
- Type: Photograph
- Medium: C-print mounted to acrylic glass
- Dimensions: 207 cm × 337 cm (81 in × 133 in)

99 Cent II Diptychon is a two-part colour photograph made by Andreas Gursky in 2001. It was based on an original photograph called 99 Cent, from 1999, sometimes called "99 cent.1999".

The work depicts a view of the interior of a 99 Cents Only Store in Los Angeles, with numerous aisles depicting goods. It was digitally altered to reduce perspective. The photograph is a chromogenic color print or c-print. It is a diptych. There were 6 sets made and mounted on an acrylic sheet. The photographs have a size of 2.07 by 3.37 metres (6.8 ft × 11.1 ft).

== History and description ==
99 Cent II Diptychon is a new version of 99 Cent, a photo made previously in 1999, while Gursky was in Los Angeles.

On this work, we can see a supermarket with shelves and many very colorful products, which capture the viewers attention. Not only are the products colorful, but they also have all the same price. The image was taken in a store of an American retail chain which sells products at 99 cents. The photograph is constructed like an architectural drawing with the horizontal shelves of the supermarket perpendicular to its vertical columns.

On the question if the picture is meant as a critic of the consumer society, Claire Guillot, writing for the French newspaper Le Monde, states that "The artist, who first dreamed of being a painter, was always much more interested in the ordering of objects in space, in the internal organization of an image, than in the reality that it depicts. Hence the innumerable retouchings, which tip the works over into artifice. And to quote Andreas Gursky: “Social criticism is up to you to see. My main interest is making images."

== Art market ==
The work became famous as being the most expensive photograph in the world when it was auctioned at Sotheby's on February 7, 2007, for a price of US$3.34 million. Another auction in New York in May 2006 fetched $2.25 million for a second print, and a third print sold for $2.48 million in November 2006 at a New York gallery. These would be the fourth and sixth-most costly photographs sold, as of 2011. On May 12, 2011, Cindy Sherman's Untitled #96 from 1981 was sold for $3.89 million.

== See also ==
- List of most expensive photographs
- List of photographs considered the most important
