= 99 Cent (photograph) =

Photograph by Andreas Gurksy

- Artist: Andreas Gursky
- Year: 1999

99 Cent is a colour photograph by German photographer Andreas Gursky, created in 1999. It depicts a view of the interior of a 99 Cents Only Store in Los Angeles. It was created with the use of digital manipulation, like the artist has done for his work since 1990. The photograph was included in Time magazine's 1999 list of the 100 most important photographs ever taken. Gursky made a new version of this photograph, 99 Cent II Diptychon, in 2001, which would be one of the most expensive ever sold.

== History and description ==
Gursky explained that he was inspired to create this photograph one day while driving in Los Angeles, on his first time there, when he became fascinated by a similar store window. The current photograph depicts several shelves of consumer goods aligned in a row, all with the same price, including recognizable brands of chocolates, beverages, peanut butter and tooth paste. The result is a large colourful composition, where six white poles stand out and conduct the viewers gaze to the posters that advertise the brand of supermarkets at the wall of the background. Some people are also visible in the composition. The official website of The Broad states that "The spectacle of consumerism appears composed in an organized, rigorous, formal fashion. The presented image is hyperreal. While it is rooted in reality, it is somehow more than real; it is familiar and yet there is no physical space quite like it. By portraying such heightened constructions of our shared existence — from the dollar store to the soccer field to the sprawling cityscape — Gursky’s photographs act as symbols of contemporary life."

Sophie Duplaix stated that "The succession of shelves, like a wave, gives a dizzying dimension to the image, which is reinforced by the reflection on the ceiling of the displays. It is in a second phase that the figures of the customers of the store emerge, which the profusion of packaging seemed to have swallowed up. We can read here all the ambiguity of the presence of man in Gursky, a presence which, when it is not as a crowd, multitude or gathering, the subject of the work – where it is just as instrumentalized –, serves as an indicator of scale rather than as a support for a narration."

Naomi Blumberg observes: "He manipulated the colour to create an explosion of repeating reds, yellows, and oranges dotted with blue, pink, white, and black. He also digitally inserted a reflection of the merchandise onto the ceiling, adding to the overwhelming visual effect and to the sensation of being surrounded by consumer culture gone mad."

== Art market ==
A print of this photograph sold for $2,256,000 on 6 May 2006, at Sotheby's New York.

== Public collections ==
There are prints of the photograph at the San Francisco Museum of Modern Art, at The Broad, in Los Angeles, the Museum of Contemporary Art, in Los Angeles, and at the Musée National d'Art Moderne, in Paris.

== See also ==
- List of most expensive photographs
