= Chicago Board of Trade III =

Photograph by Andreas Gurksy

Chicago Board of Trade III is a color photograph made by German artist Andreas Gursky in 1999–2009. It is the third version of the original picture, previously titled Chicago Board of Trade (1997) and Chicago Board of Trade II (1999). The artist used the same previous process of manipulating the images by computer before achieving the final result. These three pictures were part of a series dedicated to the worldwide "Stock Exchanges".

== Description ==
The picture has a large format, as its usual with the author's photographs. This third and final version seems to have been inspired by new developments in the field of image editing. It shows the space of the board of trade in a more clear way than the previous picture of the series, depicting the turmoil of the brokers in a usual working day. Sotheby's website states that "Depicted on a grand scale with a heightened sense of drama, Chicago Board of Trade III carries the epic quality of History Paintings, whilst also revellinging in the abstract qualities of the architectural structure and the teeming maelstrom of activity in the legendary “Pit.”"

== Art market ==
This version of the picture was sold by $3,298,755 at Sotheby's, London, on 26 June 2013. This represented a 169% increase over the estimate price of $1,200,000. Another print sold by £942,500 at Sotheby's, London, on 29 June 2022.

== See also ==
- List of most expensive photographs
