= 99 Cents Only Stores =

Former American discount store chain

99 Cents Only Stores LLC
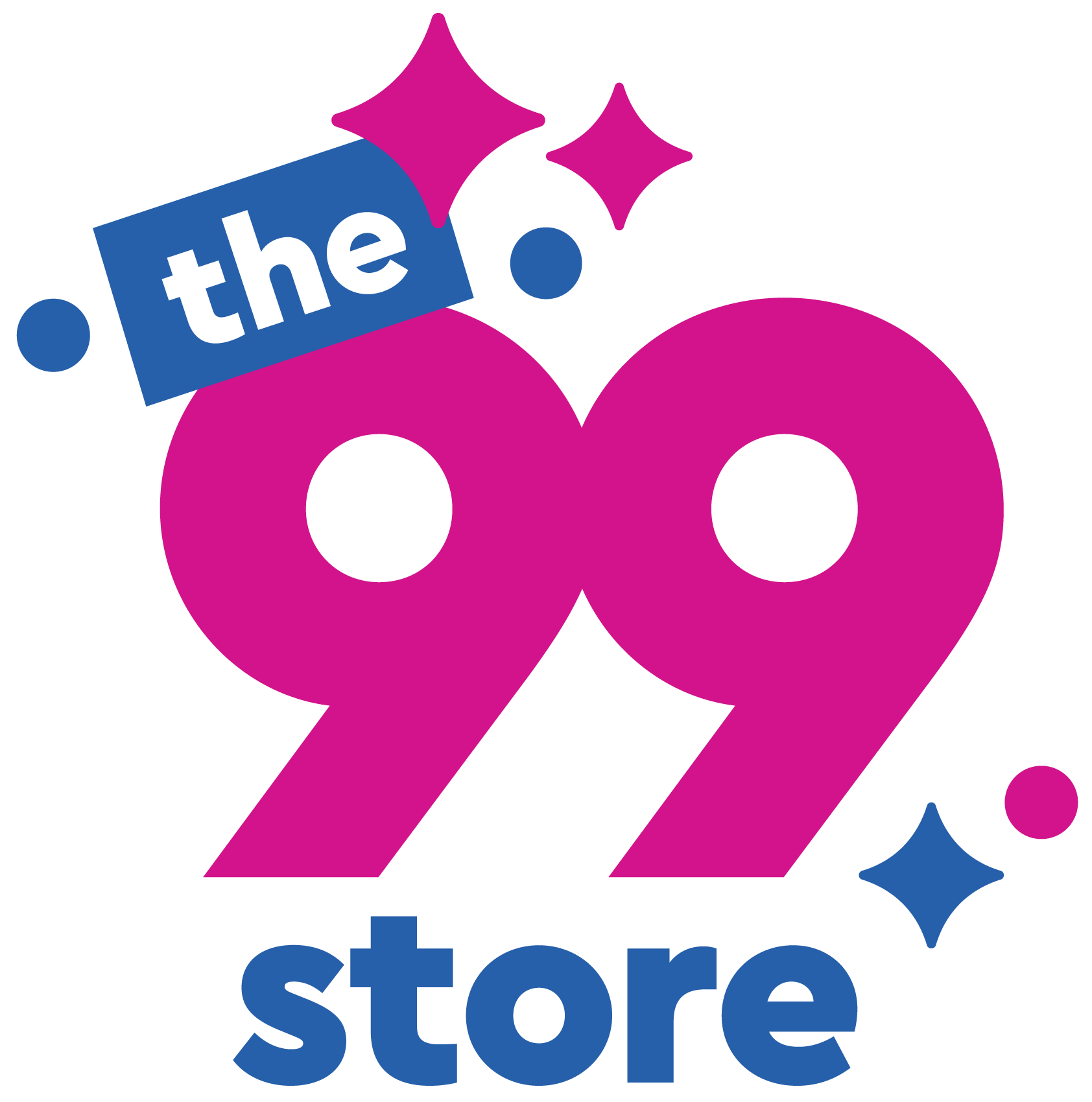
- Type: Private
- Industry: Discount, variety store
- Founded: 1982; 44 years ago, in Los Angeles
- Founder: Dave Gold
- Defunct: June 5, 2024; 2 years ago
- Fate: Chapter 11 bankruptcy in April 2024
- Headquarters: Commerce, California, United States
- Number of locations: 371 (at the announcement of its eventual closure)
- Area served: United States (locations in California, Texas, Arizona, and Nevada)
- Key people: Barry J. Feld (CEO); Mike Simoncic (Interim CEO); Jesse Allen (COO); Perry Pericleous (CFO)
- Revenue: ▲$2.06 billion (2017)
- Operating income: ▼$53 million (2017)
- Net income: ▼$118 million (2017)
- Total assets: ▲$662.87 million (2009)
- Total equity: ▼$523.85 million (2009)
- Number of employees: 14,000 (2024)
- Website: Archive of 99only.com

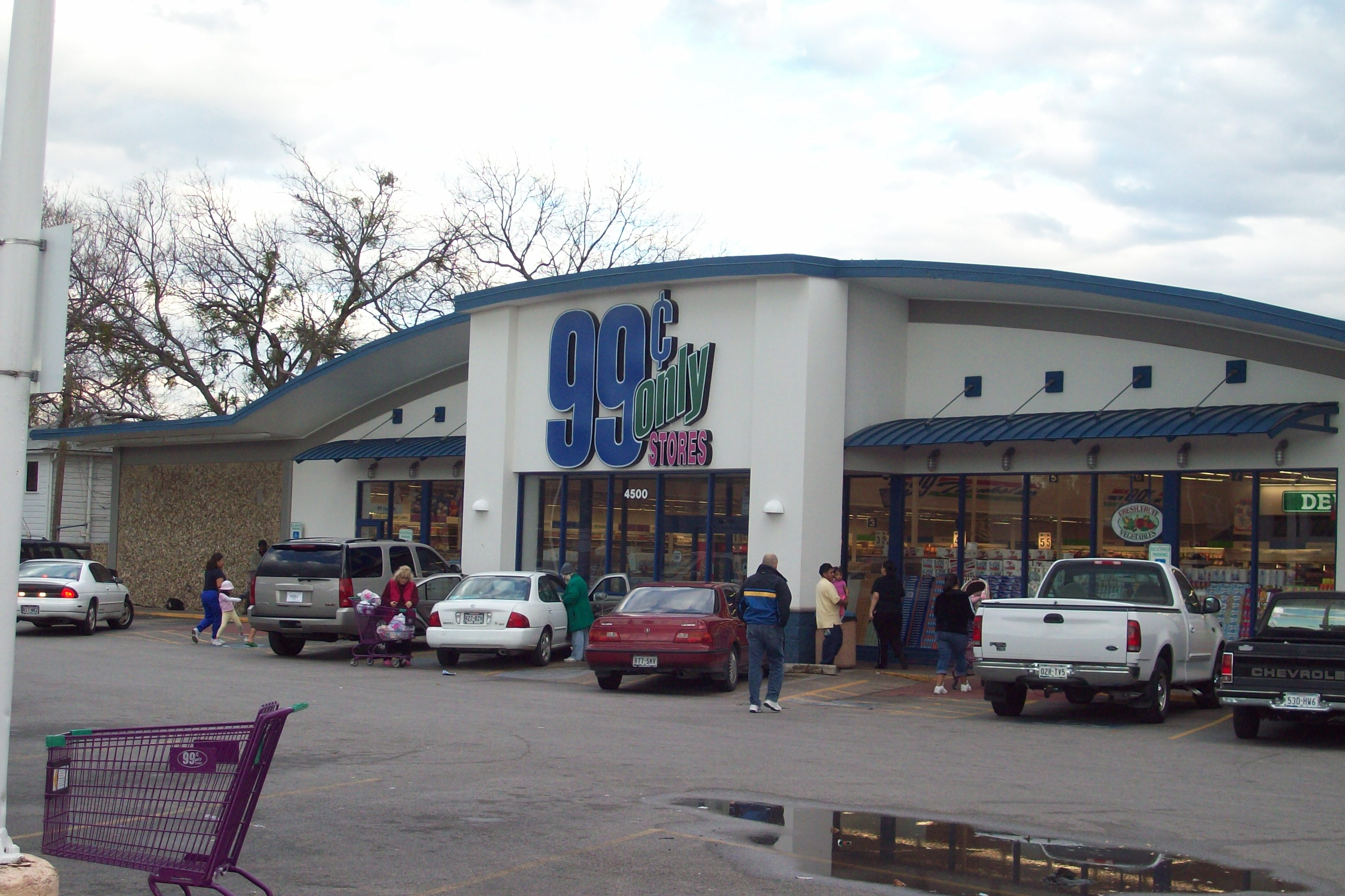
99 Cents Only Store in Dallas

99 Cents Only Stores LLC (also branded as The 99 Store) was an American price-point retailer chain based in Commerce, California. It offered "a combination of closeout branded merchandise, general merchandise and fresh foods." The store initially offered all products for 99¢ or less. The base price became 99.99¢ in 2007 and products were later introduced at higher prices.

Founded by Dave Gold in 1982, the retailer chain had locations in California, Arizona, Nevada, and Texas. The company also operated Bargain Wholesale, which sells wholesale to retailers across the United States and exports to more than 15 countries from showrooms in Los Angeles. It also exhibited at trade shows in Las Vegas, Nevada and Chicago, Illinois. The company announced all stores would close beginning April 5, 2024 and culminated on June 3, 2024 due to financial hardship.

== History ==
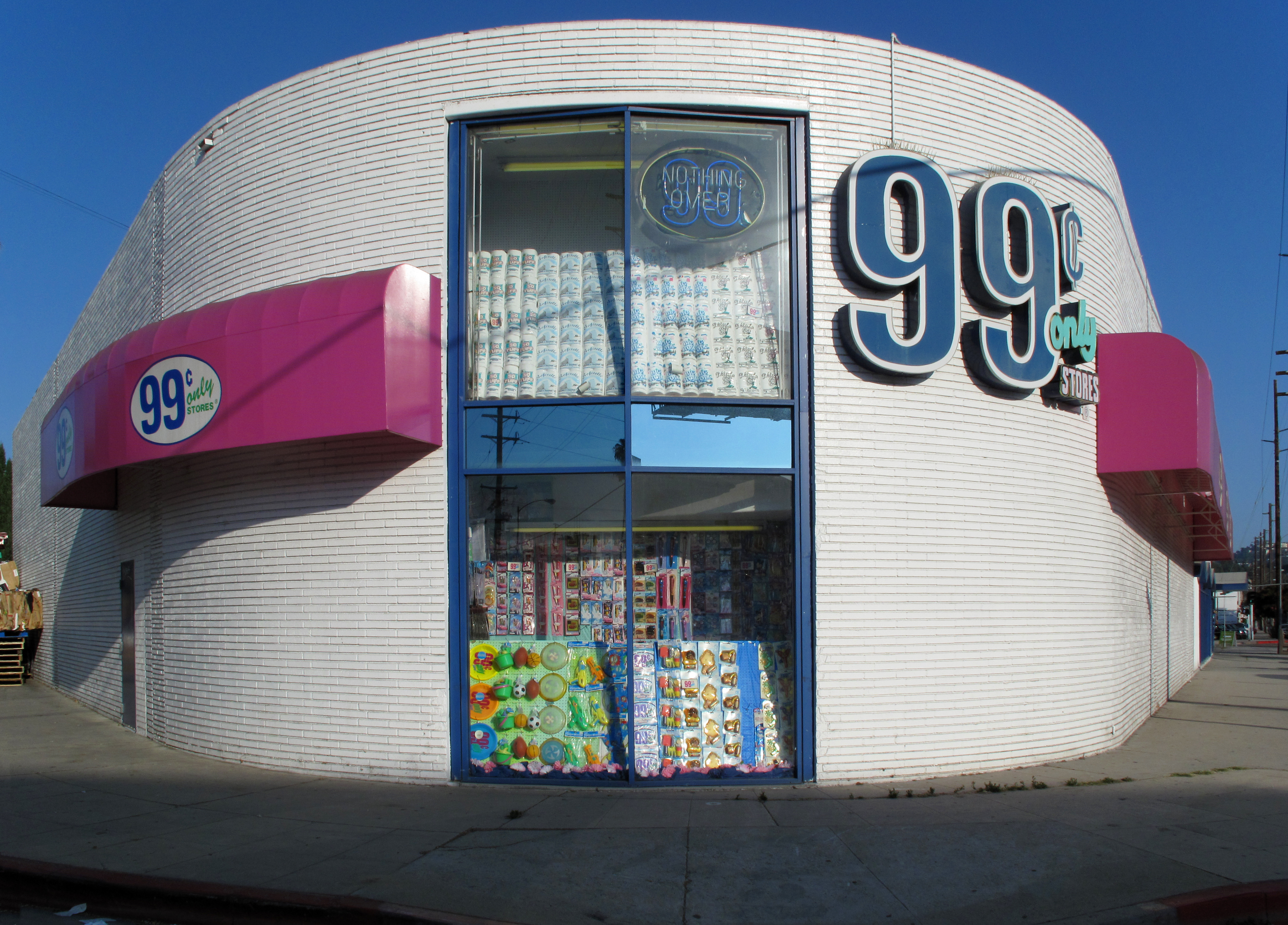
99 Cents Only Store, North Hollywood, California

=== Early history ===
"99 Cents Only Stores" dates back to the 1960s when its founder, Dave Gold, inherited a liquor store at Grand Central Market, in downtown Los Angeles, and experimented with selling bottles of wine at a fixed price-point of 99 cents. The test was successful, and Dave realized that selling everything in the store for 99 cents would make his business stand out.

"Whenever I'd put wine or cheese on sale for $1.02 or 98 cents, it never sold out," Gold said in a 2001 interview with The Los Angeles Times. "When I put a 99 cent sign on anything, it was gone in no time. I realized it was a magic number."

On August 13, 1982, Dave and Sherry Gold opened the first 99 Cents Only Store at 6921 La Tijera Boulevard, in Inglewood, California near Los Angeles International Airport. To celebrate the grand opening, Dave decided to sell television sets for only 99 cents to the first 13 families. More than 300 people showed up in line, catching the attention of more than 10 TV outlets covering the store’s first day. Inspired by the first grand opening, new stores began offering 99-cents deals for televisions and other products.

In 1996, when the company went public, Dave Gold insisted that the offering price end in 99 cents. "We weren't even sure that the FTC would allow it," said Jeff Holmes, whose firm managed the IPO.

=== 2000s ===
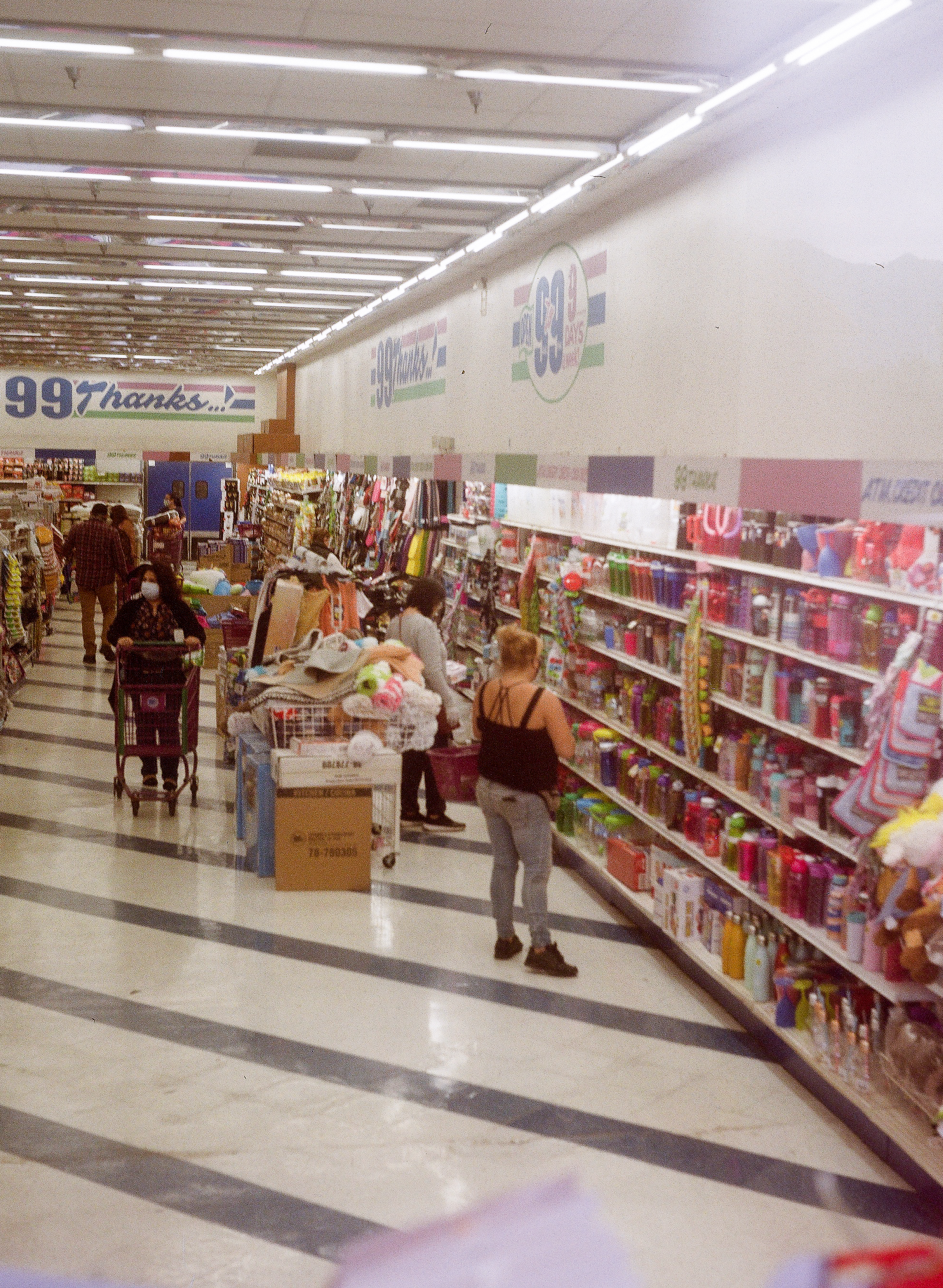
A typical interior of a 99 Cents Only Store location around this time period

In November 2003, the store began selling items for lower than 99 cents (e.g. 69 or 49 cents). The management believed that it would permit better management of commodity price increases.

In September 2007, the company raised its prices by $0.0099 (from 99 cents to 99.99 cents), marking the first increase in the history of the franchise—to combat "dramatically rising costs and inflation." The store later carried some items which were over the .9999 price point; such as $1.99 and $2.99.

On September 18, 2008, it was announced that the company would close all stores in Texas, but in February 2009, the company decided on closing just one-third of its Texas stores. The company quoted a rise in sales, promising to keep the stores open, as long as they remained profitable.

=== 2010s ===
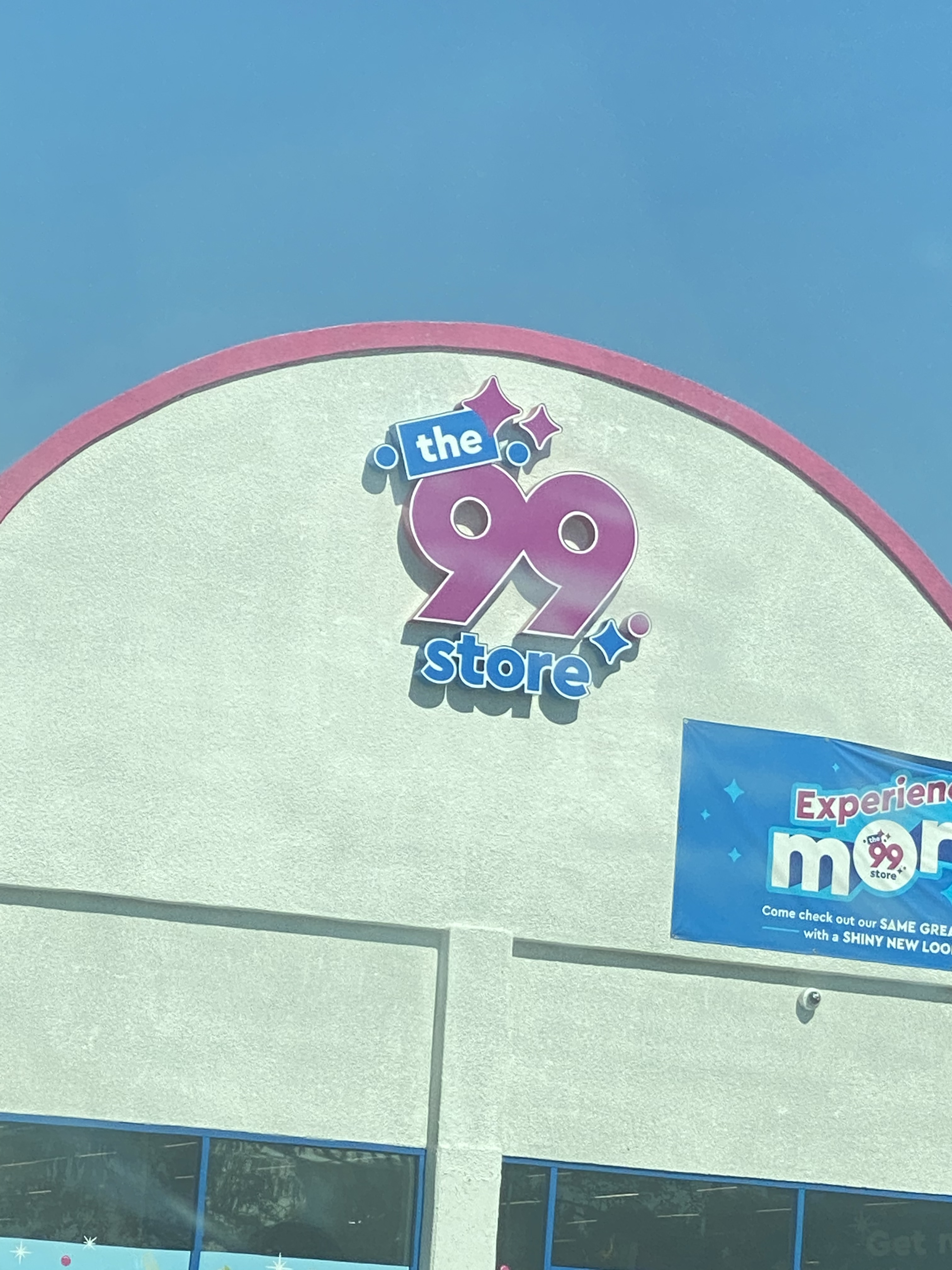
99 Cents Only store in Ontario, California with The 99 Store branding

In October 2011, the company agreed to a $1.6-billion buy-out by private equity firm Ares Management and the CPP Investment Board. The deal was completed on January 13, 2012. The new owners decided to lay off over 172 employees in October 2013. The Gold family had ended their involvement with the company in January 2013 and Dave Gold died on April 22, 2013.

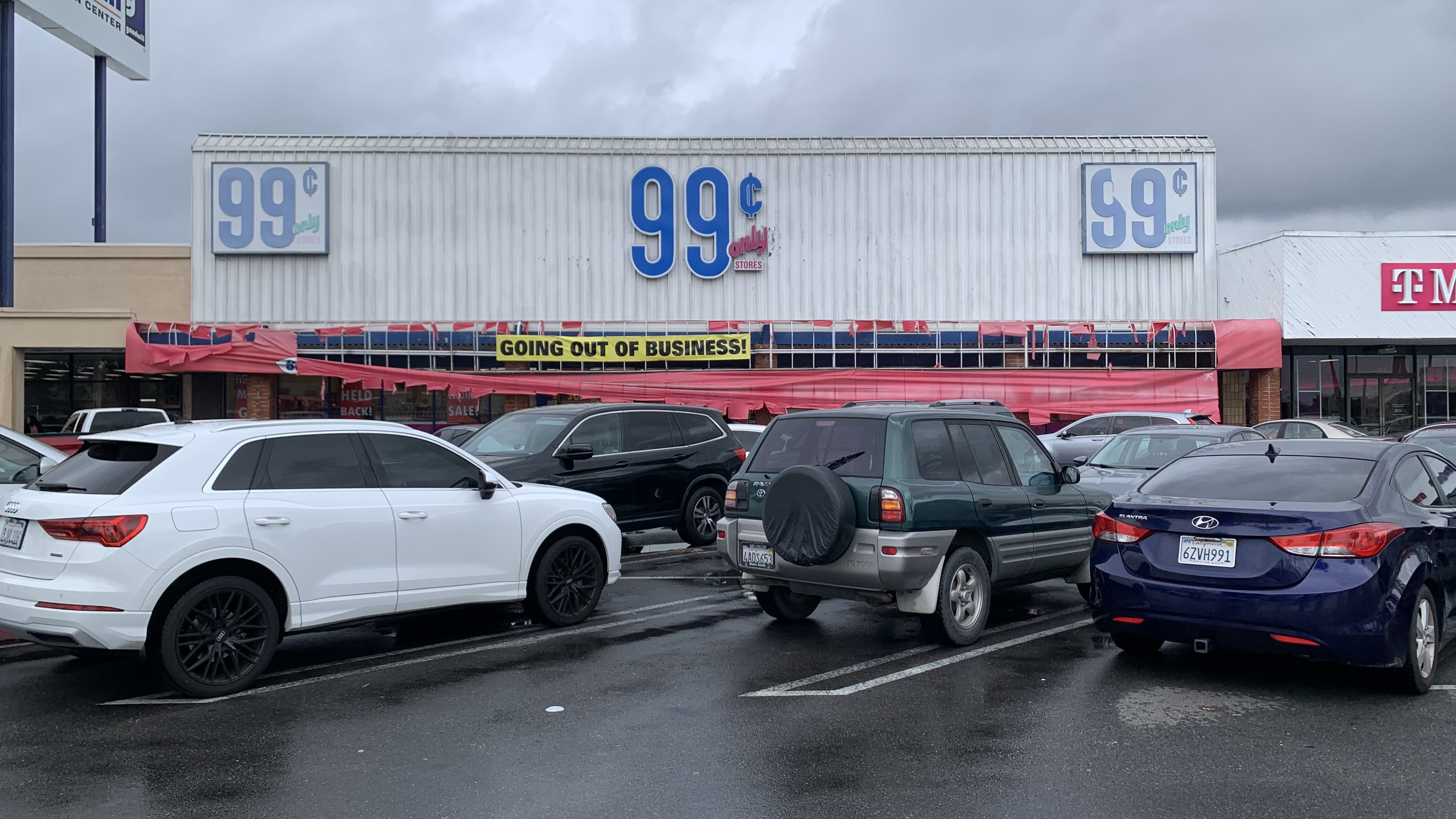
A 99 Cents Only Stores location having a liquidation sale in Reseda, Los Angeles

=== 2020s ===
In 2020, 99 Cents Only Stores began branding all future locations as The 99 Store. In September 2023, 99 Cents Only Stores announced that they sold their Los Angeles County warehouse. In October 2023, Fitch Ratings reported that 99 Cents Only Stores was nearing a potential Chapter 11 bankruptcy filing.

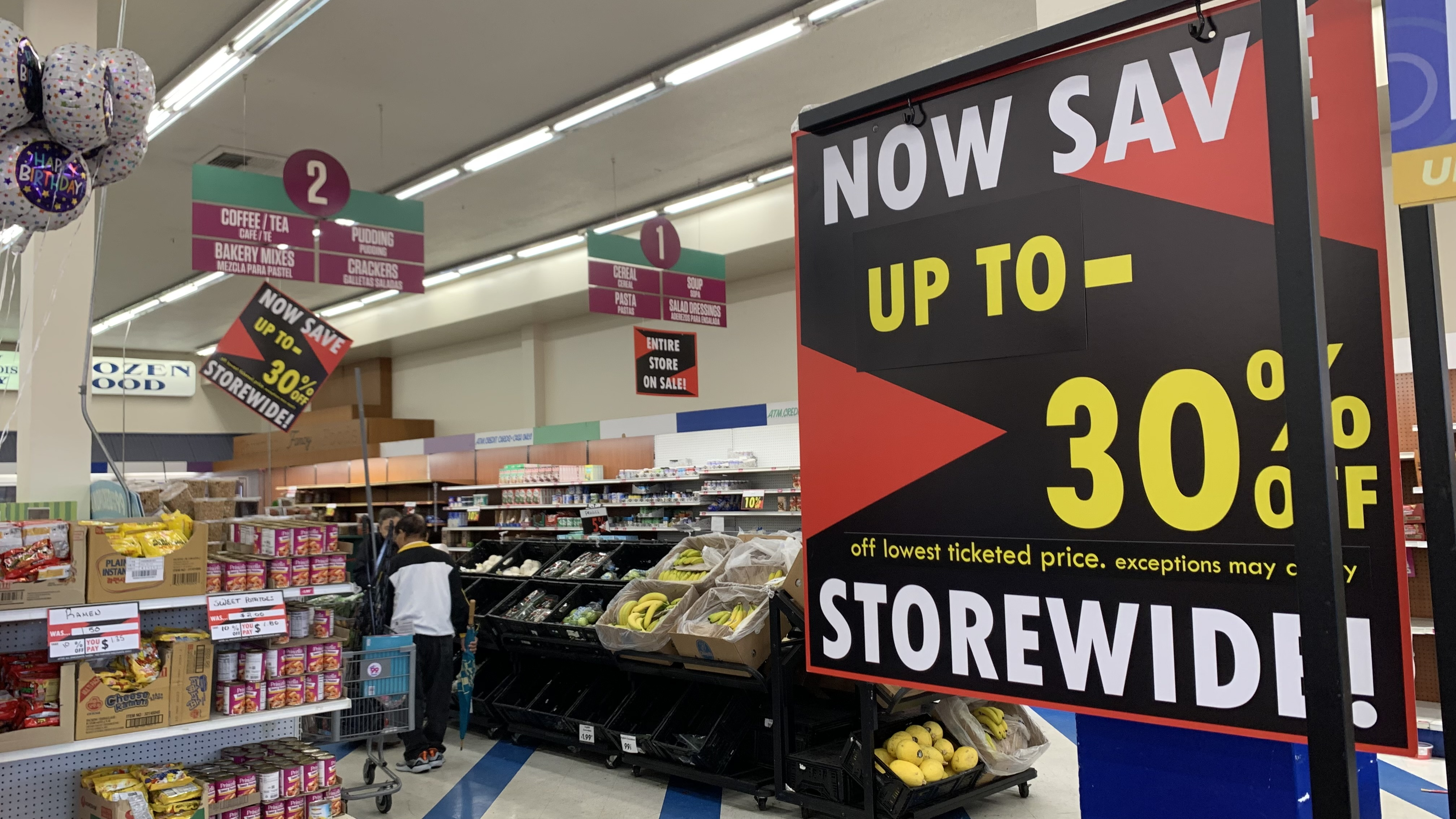
A sign promoting a 30% off sale at a 99 Cents Only Store in Reseda, California on April 14, 2024 due to it closing because of the bankruptcy

On March 28, 2024, the company warned that it may be forced to file for Chapter 11 bankruptcy within weeks as it faced a liquidity shortfall and a stalled-asset sale. It also began talks referring to liquidation.

On April 4, 2024, 99 Cents Only Stores announced that it would permanently close all of its remaining 371 locations and lay off its 14,000 employees within the coming months, with liquidation sales to be held by Hilco Global. "Going out of business" sales began at all locations on April 5, with stores expected to complete liquidation sales by June. The company blamed the effects of the COVID-19 pandemic, increasing inflation, and shifting consumer demand.

On April 8, 2024, 99 Cents Only Stores filed for Chapter 11 bankruptcy, listing total liabilities and assets between $1 billion and $10 billion. The company also stated that it has gathered $60 million to facilitate its shutdown process and also planned on a sale on its assets and leases.

=== Store acquisitions ===
On April 7, 2024, Mark J. Miller, CEO of Pic 'N' Save Bargains and former president of Big Lots, planned to save the discount chain after the company announced it was closing all stores and winding down its business operations in California, Texas, Arizona and Nevada. Miller said he has put together a group of investors, including some former 99 Cents Only Stores executives, to try to acquire the Southern California stores and continue the chain's commitment to the community. The affected stores would temporarily close for up to 90 days after liquidation sales are complete to make way for renovations and restocking, and then reopen soon after.

On May 24, 2024, Ollie's Bargain Outlet announced that they had acquired 11 former 99 Cents Only leases, which reopened as Ollie's Bargain Outlet stores by the end of 2024.

On May 29, 2024, Dollar Tree announced that they had purchased the leases of up to 170 of closed 99 Cents Only locations across four states. The company reopened the closed locations as Dollar Tree stores beginning in Fall 2024.

== In popular culture ==
99 Cents Only Stores advertised that it was open "9 days a week", often invoking humorous commentary on holidays with products sold for 99 cents. One advertisement wished Joan Rivers a "Happy 99th Facelift", another congratulated the "(Los Angeles) Dodgers on Losing 99 Games." The company also celebrated the 99th birthday of public figures and named 99-year-old individuals as honorary spokespersons for 99 Cents Only Stores.

99 Cent II Diptychon by Andreas Gursky became, at the time of its sale in February 2007, the most expensive photograph, at $3.3 million.

99 Cents Only Stores allowed returns of up to nine items within nine days of purchase and were typically open from 9 a.m. to 9 p.m., although individual stores could open at 8 a.m. or close at 10 p.m. The store mottos included: "Do the 99", "Low prices are born here, and raised elsewhere", featuring a picture of a baby chick.

== See also ==
- Dollar Tree
- 99 Cent (photograph)
