= Untitled 93 =

1981 photograph by Cindy Sherman

Untitled #93
- Artist: Cindy Sherman
- Year: 1981
- Type: Photograph
- Medium: Chromogenic color print
- Dimensions: 61 cm × 120 cm (24 in × 48 in)

Untitled #93 is a color photograph created by Cindy Sherman in 1981. It is part of her Centerfolds series of 12 photographs made for the Artforum magazine. They were never published there but went to be exhibited publicly the same year, to critical acclaim.

== Description ==
The picture depicts a young blonde woman lying in her bed, in underwear, with a tired and sweaty expression, while pulling her black sheets to her chest. She appears distraught as the sunlight fills the entire scene. The picture created debate, since some hinted that the photograph implied a situation of sexual abuse. Sherman denied that interpretation. She stated that "To me, the whole inspiration for the picture was somebody who'd been up all night drinking and partying and had just gone to sleep five minutes before the sun rose and woke her up. So it bothered me at first when people criticized the picture, seeing the side that I hadn't intended... I was definitely trying to provoke in those pictures."

== Art market ==
A print of the photograph was sold by $3,861,000 at Sotheby's New York, on 14 May 2014, the second most expensive by the artist. Another print was sold by $3,150,000 at Christie's New York, on 9 November 2021.

== Collections ==
There are prints of this photograph, among full series of the Centerfolds, at the Museum of Modern Art, New York, and the Metropolitan Museum of Art, New York. There are also prints at The Art Institute of Chicago, the Museum Boijmans Van Beuningen, in Rotterdam, the Astrup Fearnley Museet, in Oslo, and the National Gallery of Australia, in Canberra.

== See also ==
- List of most expensive photographs
