= Untitled Film Still 21 =

Black and white photograph by Cindy Sherman

Untitled Film Still #21
- Artist: Cindy Sherman
- Year: 1978
- Type: Photograph
- Dimensions: 24.1 cm × 19.1 cm (9.5 in × 7.5 in)

Untitled Film Still #21 is a black and white photograph taken by Cindy Sherman in 1978. It is part of her Untitled Film Stills series, taken from 1977 to 1980, which is a group of photographs that are meant to mimic film stills. It belongs to a subset within the series in which she imitates the appearance of a young secretary. #21 is also known as The City Girl, because in this photo Sherman is posing as a Hitchcock-inspired "working woman" on the streets of a big city.

== Inspiration ==
In the late 1970s, while exploring secondhand stores in New York, Sherman came across old film stills from the 1950s and 1960s. The strange similarity of the scenes prompted her to make a series of photographs in a similar vein. She purposely staged herself as female characters from movies that could have existed but never did.

== Location ==
Sherman's series of "city girl" photographs were taken near Battery Park, but she wanted the location of the work to be unknown and mysterious. She intentionally used buildings that could be in any city, and included just the windows of buildings to make them less distinguishable. Sherman recalled how "completely comfortable I felt changing in public and doing these mini performances," noting that New Yorkers of the time simply ignored her.

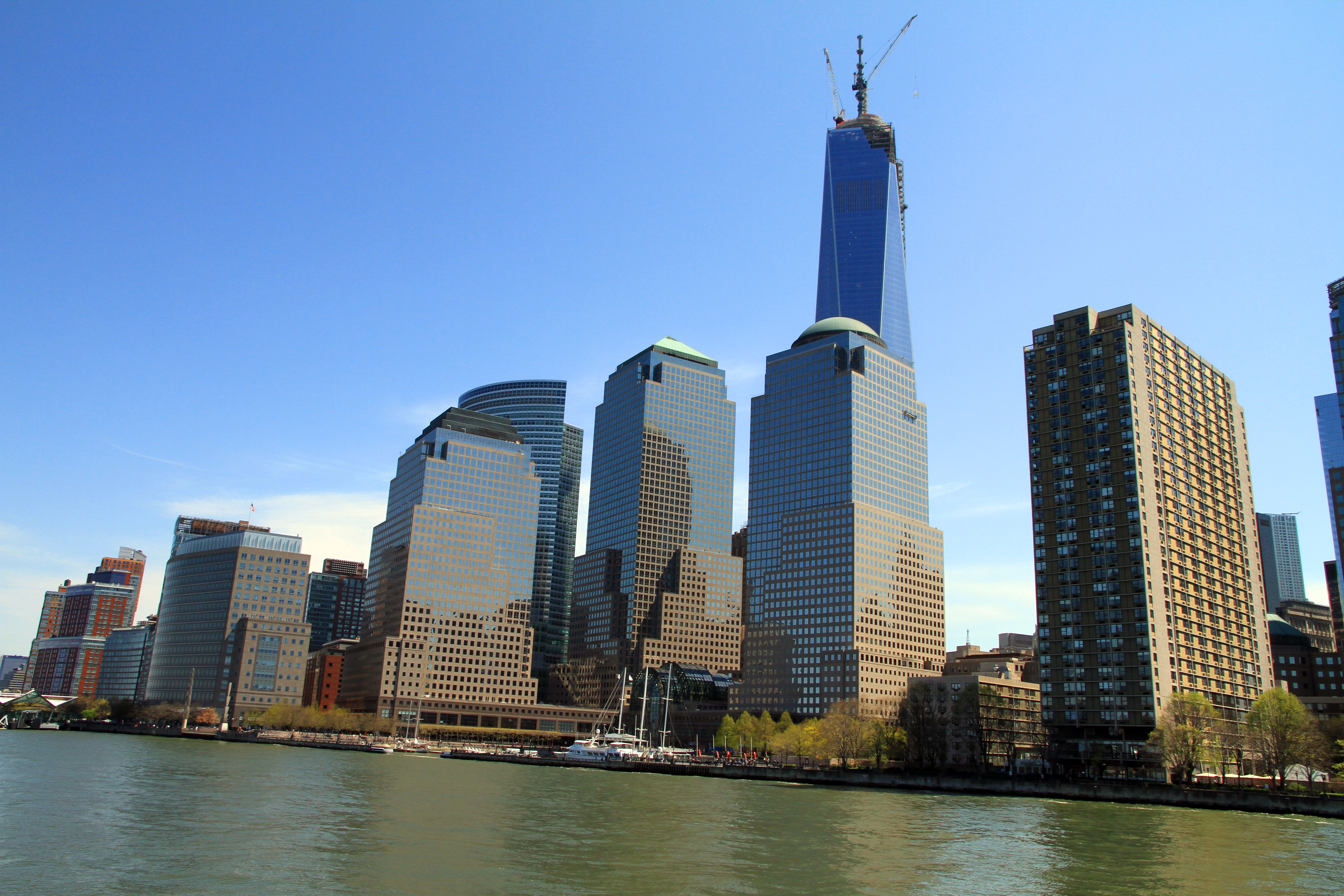
Battery Park, New York City

== Characteristics ==
In the moment captured, Sherman looks to the side with an enigmantic expression, as if she has arrived at an intersection and a sudden movement catches her eye down the road.

Sherman has her hair in short blond curls, and she portrays the young secretary worker by wearing a suit with a white collar, and a straw cloche on her head. She wears the same costume in film stills #21, #22, and #23, making up the "up-and-coming city woman" mini series. While the consistent costume links the photographs, the varied style of their compositions suggests they belong to different movie narratives. Rosalind Krauss describes the character in #21 as a "Hitchcock heroine."

According to art history professor Dr. Shana Gallagher-Lindsay, the viewer feels very close to Sherman because of the small distance between her and the camera, and the low angle allows for her upper body and the buildings in the back to be what is featured in the small frame.

== Evaluation ==
Nicholas Mirzoeff used this image in a chapter of his work "How to See the World", explicitly discussing the way of self-expression from self-portrait to selfie. For Mirzoeff, the woman in the photo stares in an invisible direction, and the feeling of opening her lips creates a "sense of threat and anxiety". He pointed out that in the classic Hollywood screen setting, "victims are always isolated like this before they suffer violence."

In Sherman's photographs, there is always a relation to something out of the frame, but it remains a mystery what she is looking at. While she is urgently looking to the side in this photograph, the audience does not know what she sees. According to art historians Dr. Shana Gallagher-Lindsay and Beth Harris, while having this fragile expression, Sherman represents how being a woman always feels like a performance, and she voices a feminist message in Untitled Film Still #21 through her secretary outfit and innocent countenance. Her changes from character to character throughout the series show that a woman's identity is not fixed; by constantly dressing up and becoming someone new, she portrays how women can be whoever they want.

== Public collections ==
There are prints of this photograph at the Museum of Contemporary Art, in Los Angeles, the Museum of Contemporary Art, in Chicago, the Metropolitan Museum of Art and the Museum of Modern Art, in New York.

== See also ==
- Classical Hollywood cinema
- Film noir
- Stock character
