= Untitled Film Stills =

Photography series by Cindy Sherman

Untitled Film Stills is a series of black and white photographs by American visual artist Cindy Sherman predominantly made between 1977 and 1980, which gained her international recognition. Sherman casts herself in various stereotypical female roles inspired by 1950s and 1960s films.

They represent clichés or feminine types "that are deeply embedded in the cultural imagination." It was later sponsored by Madonna at the Museum of Modern Art (MoMA) in 1997.

== Details ==
Cindy Sherman poses in various stereotypical female roles inspired by 1950s and 1960s Hollywood, Film noir, B movies, and European art-house films. They represent clichés or feminine types (the office girl, bombshell, girl on the run, housewife, and so on) "that are deeply embedded in the cultural imagination."

Untitled Film Still #21
- Artist: Cindy Sherman
- Year: 1978

The characters in all of these photographs are usually looking away from the camera and outside of the frame. Sherman casts herself in each of these roles, becoming both the artist and subject in the work.

All of the images are untitled, as Sherman wanted to preserve their ambiguity. The numbers affiliated with individual works of art are assigned by her gallery, mainly as a cataloguing system. In December 1995, the Museum of Modern Art (MOMA) acquired all sixty-nine black-and-white photographs in the series. Sherman later decided to add one more image, bringing the series to seventy. In past exhibitions at MOMA, the photographs are neither hung chronologically, nor grouped according to theme, locale, or content. Modest in scale compared to Sherman's later cibachrome photographs, they are all 8½ × 11 inches, each displayed in identical, simple black frames. The glossy finish and scale are meant to reference publicity or promotion stills for a movie.

== Origins ==
Sherman was born in 1954 in Glen Ridge, New Jersey. She started working on Untitled Film Stills while she was a college student in Buffalo, New York. Sherman moved to New York in the summer of 1977, where she worked as a gallery assistant and receptionist at Artists Space. Untitled Film Stills was first exhibited in its entirety in 1981 at Metro Pictures, a gallery in Manhattan.

In a 2008 interview celebrating the 40th anniversary of the exhibition, Mark Stevens asks Sherman in New York magazine about the roles she played for the series and how they came to be:

I was trying to think of a new way to take pictures and tell a story. David Salle had been working at some sleazy magazine company where they had lots of shots of half-clothed women around, for those photo-novellas, like a cartoon but with photos. Slightly racy. It got me thinking, this cheap, throwaway image—if you just look at one, you make up your own story.

In an essay, The Making of Untitled, accompanying the 1995 Museum of Modern Art (MOMA) exhibition, Sherman reflects on her beginnings with this series:

I suppose unconsciously, or semiconsciously at best, I was wrestling with some sort of turmoil of my own about understanding women. The characters weren't dummies; they weren't just airhead actresses. They were women struggling with something but I didn't know what. The clothes make them seem a certain way, but then you look at their expression, however slight it may be, and wonder if maybe "they" are not what the clothes are communicating. I wasn't working with a raised "awareness," but I definitely felt that the characters are questioning something-perhaps being forced into a certain role. At the same time, those roles are in film: the women aren't being lifelike, they're acting. There are so many levels of artifice. I like that whole jumble of ambiguity.

== Critical reception and feminist controversy ==
Untitled Film Stills has stirred controversy among art critics and feminist scholars for decades. The scholar Jui-Ch'i Liu identifies three main through-lines of criticism in the 1980s and 90s:

The first, exemplified by Margaret Iversen’s and Mira Schor’s writings, attacks Sherman’s masquerade as conforming repetitively to women’s objectification by the male eroticized gaze under patriarchy...Conversely, the second group, represented by Laura Mulvey’s, Abigail Solomon Godeau’s and Jackie Stacey’s interpretations, regards Sherman’s masquerade as parodying the female stereotypes in popular films. The third group attempts to open the prospect of a more mobile understanding of the male spectator’s reactions...The male viewer’s customary control over the female body is simultaneously reinforced and destabilized.

The artist and critic Mia Schror thought that Sherman was not challenging patriarchy through irony, especially as the photographs of Sherman's body started to sell. Sherman's depictions of women dressed in scandalously clad clothing, with vacant expressions, were still objectification therefore anti-feminist to Schror, even if the objectification was done by Sherman herself.

Laura Mulvey, a film theorist who coined the phrase "male gaze", argues that Sherman's parodies of Classic Hollywood caricatures create a sense of "nostalgia [that] begins to dissolve into unease" in the viewer, and therefore creates thought provoking, challenging, referential images.

Amelia Jones, an art historian and professor, takes a position between Schror and Mulvey, where Sherman's body in the series acts as both a performer and an activist. The photographs are "notable precisely in that they interweave the 1970s feminist production of the subject as an effect of the gaze with the twentieth-century exploration of the subject (via masquerade)."

The art historian Rosalind Krauss famously described the series as “copies without originals”.

== Legacy ==
Untitled Film Still #48
- Artist: Cindy Sherman
- Year: 1979

Art curator Eva Respini stated that this is “arguably one of the most significant bodies of work made in the twentieth century and thoroughly canonized by art historians, curators, and critics.”

The art critic Benjamin Sutton said "The series has been thoroughly absorbed by the market and into the contemporary art canon. It is considered the seminal project that set Sherman on her path to becoming one of the most famous photo-based artists working today. It also stands as a textbook example of the Pictures Generation’s postmodernist approach."

Untitled Film Still #21 was listed as one of the 100 influential photographs by TIME Magazine.

A selection of 21 photographs of the series was sold by Christie's for $6,773,000 on 11 November 2014. Three prints of Untitled Film Still #48 were among the most expensive ever sold, selling for between 1 and 3 million dollars.

== See also ==
- Untitled Film Still 21
- Untitled Film Still 48
- List of photographs considered the most important
- Classical Hollywood Cinema
