= Dead Troops Talk =

Color photograph by Jeff Wall

- Artist: Jeff Wall
- Year: 1992
- Type: Photograph
- Dimensions: 229.2 cm × 417.2 cm (90.2 in × 164.3 in)
- Location: The Broad, Los Angeles

Dead Troops Talk, full title Dead Troops Talk (A Vision After an Ambush of a Soviet Army Patrol near Moqor, Afghanistan, Winter 1986), is a color photograph made by Jeff Wall in 1992. It has the dimensions of 229.2 by 417.2 cm.

== History and description ==
This picture is an example of Wall's complex productions involving cast, sets, crews and digital postproduction. The staged photograph depicts the aftermath of a fictional attack on a Soviet Army patrol by the Mujahideen during the Soviet-Afghan War, near Mogor, in the winter of 1986. The setting is an inhospitable desert. The thirteen Soviet soldiers are seen rising from the dead, still with the visible effects of the deadly attack: wounds and missing limbs. They behave bizarrely, one of them shows his wounds to another one, for example. Three of the Mujahideen who killed them are shown at the scene, one of them inspecting the content of a bag and the legs of two others seen with the assembled weapons and ammunition of the dead soldiers.

Wall explained that:

I had a sudden notion of a dialogue of the dead, coming from I don't know where. It had nothing to do with the Afghan war, but the subjects needed to be soldiers because it seemed important that they would have died in an official capacity, that would surely give them something to talk about... At the time I was thinking about it, the Afghan war was coming to an end.

Wall was inspired by war photography and by the 19th-century painting from artists like Francisco Goya, particularly the prints series The Disasters of War, Antoine Gros, Théodore Géricault and Édouard Castres's panorama of the French retreat at the Franco-Prussian War.

The picture was created during six years in a set at a temporary studio in Burnaby, British Columbia. Wall created all the details of the composition, like the soldiers' disposition in the set, the uniforms and the wounds.

Wall stated that:

It was important to have that level of plausibility, and it's more interesting aesthetically to do it that way. It has a relation to ways of seeing the truth, but it doesn't have a direct relation. That's why I called it a 'hallucination', a 'vision'.

== Art market ==
The photograph set an auction record for Wall, having sold for $3,666,500 at Christie's, New York, on 8 May 2012.

== Cultural references ==
Susan Sontag finished her book, Regarding the Pain of Others (2003), with a long discussion of this photograph, calling Wall's Goya-influenced depiction, "exemplary in its thoughtfulness and power."

== Public collections ==
A copy of this picture is held at The Broad, in Los Angeles.

== See also ==
- List of most expensive photographs
- List of photographs considered the most important
