= Chicago Board of Trade (photograph) =

Photograph by Andreas Gurksy

Chicago Board of Trade, also known as Chicago Board of Trade I, is a colour photograph made by German artist Andreas Gursky in 1997. It is the original picture that he took of the Chicago Board of Trade, of which he would make new versions in 1999 and in 2009. The photograph had six editions, one of which is at The Broad Museum, in Los Angeles. It is also a part of a series that the artist made on the subject of stock exchanges and board of trades across the world, since 1990.

== Description ==
The picture has a large, variable, format. Similarly to others of his pictures, this one was taken from a high point of view, allowing a broader vision of the board of trade. In this original version, the space depicted is larger, showing the surrounding area, including the balconies and some of the walls, of the Chicago Board of Trade, while its center, famously named "the pit", bursts with a colourful number of people, who are the stockbrokers, apparently in a typical business day. The balconies area would be cropped in the two following versions. Gursky explains that for this kind of photographs “The camera’s enormous distance from these figures means they become de-individualized”, “... So I am never interested in the individual but in the human species and its environment”. The Christie's website stated:" As in all of Gursky's greatest works, Chicago Board of Trade creates an intriguing synthesis between the macro and the micro scales: we can see each face, each movement, each moment preserved in this photograph, order seemingly emerging from chaos. Gursky, watching over this scene from an almost scientific perspective, (...) has immortalized and even celebrated the people and the mass to which they belong, capturing fleeting beauty as glimpsed at the heart of the hustle and bustle of contemporary, capitalist life."

== Art market ==
This first version was sold by $2,507,755 at Sotheby's, London, on 24 June 2013, making it one of the most expensive photographs ever sold. Prints of the same photograph also sold by $902,500 on 12 May 2010, and by $756,000, on 17 May 2023, both at Christie's.

== See also ==
- Chicago Board of Trade II
- Chicago Board of Trade III
