= Los Angeles (photograph) =

Photograph by Andreas Gurksy

Los Angeles is a colour photograph made by German visual artist Andreas Gursky in 1998. It is an edition of six. The image was manipulated by computer, following the artist usual process. Its one of the largest examples of the artist's work.

== Description ==
The photograph was taken from the Griffith Observatory, and is a south panoramic view of Los Angeles, California, at night, under a very dark sky, apparently devoid of any visible stars, with only the city lights shining through. The cosmic-like vision of the city even gives the impression of showing part of the Earth's curvature. The Phillips website states that "Breath-taking in its impactful splendour, the sheer scale of the three-meter-long Cibachrome print is a paragon of photography, an exemplary celebration of the possibilities of the medium.(...)/ Showcasing the grandeur of the scene, Gursky unveils a moment in time, suspended in his perfected tension between flatness and perspective, his capturing of localized detail lending itself to the overarching essence of sublime abstract composition." The picture sense of style and perspective draws influence from the German photographic couple Bernd and Hilla Becher, who had been Gursky's teachers, and other artists like Barnett Newman and Dan Flavin.

== Art market ==
A print of Los Angeles was sold at Sotheby's, London, by $2,900,000, on 27 February 2008. Another print, signed and dated in the reverse: "A Gursky "Los Angeles" 4/6 '98'" sold at Phillips, London, on 6 October 2017 for £1,689,000 ($2,297,040).

== Public collections ==
Prints of the picture are held at The Broad, in Los Angeles, and at the Harvard Art Museums, in Cambridge, Massachusetts.

== See also ==
- List of most expensive photographs
