= Dave Gold =

American businessman (1932–2013)

- Born: June 5, 1932; Cleveland, Ohio, U.S.
- Died: April 22, 2013 (aged 80); Los Angeles, California, U.S.
- Education: Los Angeles High School; Los Angeles City College (dropped out)
- Occupation: businessman
- Known for: Founder of 99 Cents Only Stores

Dave Gold (June 5, 1932 – April 22, 2013) was an American businessman who established the 99 Cents Only chain of discount stores, later also known as The 99 Store.

== Early life ==
Gold was born in Cleveland, Ohio, to Russian Jewish immigrants who operated a general store.

His family moved to Los Angeles in 1945. Gold graduated from Los Angeles High School and began studies at Los Angeles City College, but dropped out to run his family's liquor store after his father had a heart attack.

== Career ==
Gold opened the first 99 Cents Only store in 1982. At the time, the dollar store concept was considered a retail graveyard for expired or broken products. Gold made his store bright and well organized and cultivated relationships with vendors, sometimes plying them with bagels and cream cheese. 99 Cents went public on the New York Stock Exchange in 1996.

Gold died in his home in the mid-Wilshire area of Los Angeles from an apparent heart attack.
