= Paris, Montparnasse (photograph) =

Photograph by Andreas Gurksy

Paris, Montparnasse is a colour photograph created by German photographer Andreas Gursky in 1993. The large photograph has the overall dimensions of 210 by 395 cm, and had a five copies edition.

== Description and analysis ==
The photograph depicts the Immeuble d’habitation Maine-Montparnasse II, in the Rue Commandant-Mouchotte, in Paris, a work of French architect Jean Dubuisson, built from 1959 to 1964. The picture was one of the first made after Gursky decided to use digital manipulation, and what is depicted can't be seen in reality, its only the artist's creation, because the view is blocked by buildings in either side of the frame. The picture shows Gursky's interest in architectural motives and his approach, like in other works, is closer to painting, reminding the works of Dutch painter Piet Mondrian, specially his famous grid creations, and German painter Gerhard Richter "Colour Charts".

In the words of Peter Galassi: “Like the multiplicity of Richter’s subtle tints and hues, each in its place, the flickering asymmetry of the window treatments of Gursky’s individual apartments enlivens the massive, rigorously organised whole with the impression of abundant variety”. The reference to the human presence even becomes voyeuristic. Martin Hentschell stated that the picture recalls "the stance assumed by the lead in Alfred Hitchcock’s film Rear Window. Paris, Montparnasse becomes a ‘rear window’ blown up into megalomanical dimensions and tailored to the present day, whilst still maintaining the distance that is so decisive for Gursky”.

== Art market ==
A print of the photograph was sold by $2,416,475 at the Sotheby's, London, on 17 October 2013.

== Public collections ==
There are prints of the photograph at Museum Ludwig, in Cologne, and at the Tate Modern, in London.

== See also ==
- List of most expensive photographs
