= Untitled 153 =

Photograph by Cindy Sherman

Untitled #153
- Artist: Cindy Sherman
- Year: 1985
- Type: Photograph
- Medium: Chromogenic color print
- Dimensions: 170 cm × 120 cm (67 in × 49 in);
- Owner: Anonymous

Untitled #153 is a color photograph made by American visual artist Cindy Sherman in 1985.

== History and description ==
The picture resulted from an invitation of the magazine Vanity Fair to create a series of photographs inspired by fairy tales. The photographs would never be published by the magazine but are amongst some of her best and more representative work. They tend to be more dark and grotesque than the sources where it is supposed to have taken inspiration, and are not directly inspired by any specific fairy tale. The current picture is, like its usual in the artist, a self-portrait, depicting a woman, lying in the ground as a corpse, covered with mud in what appears to be a natural environment.

Eva Respini said of the picture: “Even when Sherman is in the photographs, she appears doll-like and artificial, as in Untitled #153. Reminiscent of a crime scene photo, the picture shows a dead woman lying on the ground and covered in dirt, her glassy eyes opened wide, as if shocked by her own violent demise. Unlike a police photograph, however, this larger-than-life glossy picture is full of seductive detail, with rich descriptions of the colors and textures of the gravel background, the woman’s mussed hair, and her waxy face."

== Public collections ==
There are prints of the photograph at the Museum of Modern Art, New York, the Museum of Contemporary Art, Chicago, the Musée d'art contemporain de Montréal, The Israel Museum, Jerusalem, and the Museo Rufino Tamayo, Mexico City.

== See also ==
- List of most expensive photographs
