= List of most expensive photographs =

Man Ray's Le Violon d'Ingres, 1924

This is a list of the 30 highest prices paid for photographs (in US dollars unless otherwise stated). All prices include the buyer's premium, which is the auction house fee for handling the work.

== List ==
Rank	Artist	Work	Price	Date	Seller/Auction
1	Man Ray	Le Violon d'Ingres (1924)	$12,400,000	May 14, 2022	Christie's New York
2	Edward Steichen	The Flatiron (1904)	$11,800,000	November 10, 2022	Christie's New York
3	Andreas Gursky	Rhein II (1999)	$4,338,500	November 8, 2011	Christie's New York
4	Man Ray	Noire et Blanche (1926)	$4,020,000	November 17, 2022	Christie's New York
5	Richard Prince	Spiritual America (1983)	$3,973,000	May 12, 2014	Christie's New York
6	Cindy Sherman	Untitled #96 (1981)	$3,890,500	May 11, 2011	Christie's New York
7	Cindy Sherman	Untitled #93 (1981)	$3,861,000	May 14, 2014	Sotheby's New York
8	Gilbert & George	To Her Majesty (1973)	$3,765,276	June 30, 2008	Christie's London
9	Richard Prince	Untitled (Cowboy) (1998)	$3,749,000	May 12, 2014	Christie's New York
10	Jeff Wall	Dead Troops Talk (A vision after an ambush of a Red Army patrol, near Moqor, Afghanistan, winter 1986) (1992)	$3,666,500	May 8, 2012	Christie's New York
11	Richard Prince	Untitled (Cowboy) (2000)	$3,525,000	May 10, 2016	Christie's New York
12	Richard Prince	Untitled (Cowboy) (2001–2002)	$3,401,000	November 14, 2007	Sotheby's New York
13	Andreas Gursky	99 Cent II Diptychon (2001)	$3,346,456	February 2007	Sotheby's London
14	Andreas Gursky	Chicago Board of Trade III (1999–2009)	$3,298,755	June 26, 2013	Sotheby's London
15	Cindy Sherman	Untitled #93 (1981)	$3,150,000	November 9, 2021	Christie's New York
16	Man Ray	Noire et Blanche (1926)	$3,131,533	November 8, 2017	Christie's Paris
17	Richard Prince	Untitled (Cowboy) (2000)	$3,077,000	May 14, 2014	Sotheby's New York
18	Richard Prince	Untitled (Cowboy) (1997)	$3,030,000	November 9, 2021	Christie's New York
19	Cindy Sherman	Untitled Film Still #48 (1979)	$2,965,000	May 13, 2015	Christie's New York
20	Edward Steichen	The Pond—Moonlight (1904)	$2,928,000	February 2006	Sotheby's New York
21	Andreas Gursky	Los Angeles (1998)	$2,900,000	February 27, 2008	Sotheby's London
22	Cindy Sherman	Untitled #96 (1981)	$2,882,500	May 8, 2012	Christie's New York
23	Man Ray	Noire et Blanche (1926)	$2,878,148	June 25, 2025	Sotheby's London
24	Richard Prince	Untitled (Fashion) (1982)	$2,853,000	May 10, 2016	Christie's New York
25	Richard Prince	Untitled (Cowboy) (2000)	$2,840,000	May 16, 2007	Christie's New York
26	Cindy Sherman	Untitled #153 (1985)	$2,770,500	November 8, 2010	Phillips de Pury & Co. New York
27	Richard Prince	Untitled (Cowboy) (1997)	$2,600,280	October 9, 2024	Christie's London
28	Andreas Gursky	Chicago Board of Trade (1997)	$2,507,755	June 23, 2013	Sotheby's London
29	Andreas Gursky	99 Cent II Diptychon (2001)	$2,480,000	November 16, 2006	Phillips de Pury & Co. New York
30	Andreas Gursky	Paris, Montparnasse (1993)	$2,416,475	October 17, 2013	Sotheby's London

== Disputed claim ==
1. In December 2014, Peter Lik reportedly sold a photograph titled Phantom to an anonymous bidder for $6.5 million, making it potentially the third highest price paid for a photograph. Lik's claim has been greeted with much scepticism. Claims of the sale have never been proven, and the buyer has not come forward, though a lawyer claiming to represent the buyer claims that the deal was real.

== Notable sales ==
In October 2021, Justin Aversano's Twin Flames #83. Bahareh & Farzaneh (2017–2018) sold for $1,110,000 at Christie's New York in the house's official Photographs auction — the first time an NFT had been offered within that department. The lot comprised a single NFT accompanied by 100 chromogenic prints, and sold for more than ten times its low pre-sale estimate. The sale was noted by critics as a landmark moment in the convergence of traditional fine art photography markets and digital art, given that it occurred in the same auction context as works by canonical photographers such as Andreas Gursky and Cindy Sherman.

== See also ==
- List of photographs considered the most important
- List of most expensive paintings
- List of most expensive sculptures
- List of most expensive artworks by living artists
- List of most expensive books and manuscripts
- List of most expensive non-fungible tokens
