= Untitled Film Still 48 =

Photograph by Cindy Sherman

Untitled Film Still #48
- Artist: Cindy Sherman
- Year: 1979
- Type: Photograph
- Dimensions: 24 cm × 18.9 cm (9.4 in × 7.4 in)

Untitled Film Still #48 is a black and white photograph taken by Cindy Sherman in 1979. It is part of her Untitled Film Stills photographic series, taken from 1977 to 1980. This picture is also known as The Hitchhiker.

== History and description ==
The current photograph was taken in Arizona, when the artist was there on holiday, and depicts her portraying a woman, with a blonde wig and arms crossed behind her back, dressed in a pleated skirt, standing at the left side of a road, with her briefcase behind her, looking away, probably waiting for someone to pick her up. To her left, a natural landscape extends.

This picture reflects the influence of both American and European cinema, like the rest of the series, and also recalls the work of American photographer Alfred Stieglitz. Sherman said about the picture: "Out there I wanted to be further away from the camera; I didn't want to compete with the landscape. I liked being smaller in the picture and having the scenery take over".

== Art market ==
Three prints of this photograph are amongst the most expensive ever sold. A print was sold by $2,965,000 on 13 May 2015 at Christie's, New York. Another print was sold by $2,225,000 at 11 November 2014, at Sotheby's, New York, and a third by $1,565,000 at 1 April 2008, at Christie's, New York.

== Public collections ==
There are prints of the photograph at the Museum of Modern Art, in New York, the Metropolitan Museum of Art, in New York, the Institute of Contemporary Art, Boston, and at the Tate Modern, in London.

== See also ==
- List of most expensive photographs
