= Shelley Rice =

American art historian and critic

- Born: August 20, 1950 (age 76); New York City
- Occupations: Art historian; art critic
- Awards: Guggenheim Fellowship (1992); Chevaliers of the Ordre des Arts et des Lettres (2010)

Academic background
- Education: Stony Brook University (BA); New York University Institute of Fine Arts (MA)

Academic work
- Discipline: Art history
- Sub-discipline: Photography history
- Institutions: School of Visual Arts; New York University Tisch School of the Arts

Shelley Rice (born August 20, 1950) is an American art historian and critic who specializes in photography. A 1992 Guggenheim Fellow, she has written several books, including Parisian Views (1997). She is a professor at New York University Tisch School of the Arts.

== Biography ==
Rice was born on August 20, 1950 in New York City. She obtained a BA from Stony Brook University in 1972 and MA from the New York University Institute of Fine Arts in 1975, before working as a PhD student at Princeton University.

In 1975, Rice joined the School of Visual Arts faculty. She worked as an art adjunct instructor at Brooklyn College (1972-1977) and Temple University (1978-1980), before becoming an adjunct assistant professor of art history and photography at New York University in 1981. She later joined the faculty of New York University Tisch School of the Arts, eventually becoming an arts professor. She has also worked as a visiting professor at the École normale supérieure and the University of Zurich.

Rice has written and edited several books, including Parisian Views (1997), which studies photography's relationship with Paris' redevelopment in the Second French Empire, Inverted Odysseys: Claude Cahun, Maya Deren, Cindy Sherman (1999), and Xing Danwen (2015), and has co-authored several more. She is also an art and photography critic and works as a freelancer, writing for several publications and, in some cases, writing as a columnist. She won the 1989 PEN/Jerard Award for Non-Fiction Essay, and she won a 1999 Kraszna-Krausz Prize for Parisian Views.

Rice has curated several exhibitions within New York City museums and art galleries, some of which are located at NYU. She and Sandi Fellman were co-curators of the Avon Collection, a collection of works by women photographers formed by Avon Products.

Rice was a 1980 National Endowment for the Arts Fellow. In 1992, she was awarded a Guggenheim Fellowship for "a study of photography in France and Haussmann's reconstruction of Paris". She was a Fulbright Research Fellow at the Musée Carnavalet (1988-1989) and a Fulbright Lecture Fellow at Boğaziçi University (1998-1999), in the latter's case building a public television media center. In 2010, she was awarded Chevalier of the Ordre des Arts et des Lettres.

== Works ==
=== Books ===
- (co-author) Landmarks (1984)
- (co-author) Paris et le Daguerreotype (1990)
- (co-author) Jacques-Henri Lartigue (1993)
- (co-author) Pictorial Effect/Naturalistic Vision (1994)
- (co-author) The Art of the Everyday (1997)
- Parisian Views (1997)
- (ed.) Inverted Odysseys: Claude Cahun, Maya Deren, Cindy Sherman (1999)
- The Book of 101 Books (2001, essayist)
- (co-author) Vik Muniz (2004)
- (co-author) Candida Hofer: In Portugal (2007)
- (co-author) American Photography (2012)
- (co-author) Marc Ferrez: Rio (2015)
- Xing Danwen (2015).
- (co-author) Hank Willis Thomas’ Unbranded: A Century of White Women (2015)

=== Curated exhibitions ===
- Deconstruction/Reconstruction (1980), The New Museum
- Schemes: A Decade of Installation Drawings (1981), Elise Meyer Gallery
- Inverted Odysseys: Claude Cahun, Maya Deren, Cindy Sherman (1999-2000, with Lynn Gumpert), New York University Grey Art Gallery
- The View from Left Field: Photographs from the Photo Morgue of the Daily Worker (2013, with Michael Nash), Tamiment Library at New York University
