= Rhein (photograph) =

Photograph by Andreas Gurksy

Rhein, also known as Rhein I, is a colour photograph created by the German photographer Andreas Gursky in 1996. The photograph had a six copies edition. This was the first version of a photograph that become better known with his second version, Rhein II, in 1999.

== Description and analysis ==
The photograph was created using digital manipulation, which removed several human references, including people and buildings. The final result, showing the river flowing across green fields, beneath a blue cloudy sky, has similarities with the abstract paintings of Barnett Newman. Peter Galassi stated that: "Behind Gursky's taste for the imposing clarity of unbroken parallel forms spanning a slender rectangle lies a rich inheritance of reductivist aesthetics, from Friedrich to Newman to Richter to Donald Judd... (with) images that read like horizontal versions of Newman paintings." This version has less vivid colors and a narrower field of vision than Rhein II.

== Art market ==
Three prints of this photograph are among the most expensive ever sold. A print was sold by $2,098,500 at Sotheby's, New York, at 10 May 2011, and another by $1,925,000 at Phillips, at 16 May 2013. A third sold by $1,805,000 at Sotheby's, New York, at 12 November 2014.

== Public collections ==
A print of the photograph is held at the Leeum Museum of Art, in Seoul.
