= Cindy Sherman =

American photographer (born 1954)

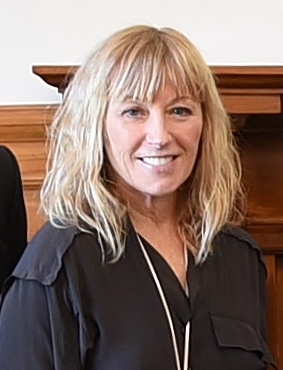
- Sherman in 2016
- Born: Cynthia Morris Sherman; January 19, 1954 (age 72); Glen Ridge, New Jersey, U.S.
- Education: SUNY
- Occupation: Artist
- Known for: Photographic self-portraits
- Notable work: Untitled #96, Untitled #153, Complete Untitled Film Stills, 1977–1980
- Spouse: Michel Auder (m. 1984; div. 1999)
- Awards: MacArthur Fellowship

Cynthia Morris Sherman (born January 19, 1954) is an American artist whose work consists primarily of photographic self-portraits, depicting herself in many different contexts and as various imagined characters.

Her breakthrough work is often considered to be the collection Untitled Film Stills, a series of 70 black-and-white photographs of herself evoking typical female roles in performance media (especially arthouse films and popular B-movies).

== Early life and education ==
Sherman was born in 1954, in Glen Ridge, New Jersey, the youngest of the five children of Dorothy and Charles Sherman. Shortly after her birth, her family moved to the township of Huntington, Long Island. Her father worked as an engineer for Grumman Aircraft. Her mother taught reading to children with learning difficulties. Sherman has described her mother as good to a fault, and her father as strict and cruel. She was raised Episcopalian.

In 1972, Sherman enrolled in the visual arts department at Buffalo State University, where she majored in painting. During this time, she began to explore the ideas which became a hallmark of her work: She dressed herself as different characters, cobbled together from thrift-store clothing. Frustrated with what she saw as the limitations of painting as a medium of art, she abandoned it and took up photography. "[T]here was nothing more to say [through painting]", she recalled. "I was meticulously copying other art, and then I realized I could just use a camera and put my time into an idea instead." Sherman has said about this time:

"One of the reasons I started photographing myself was that supposedly in the spring one of my teachers would take the class out to a place near Buffalo where there were waterfalls and everybody romps around without clothes on and takes pictures of each other. I thought, 'Oh, I don't want to do this. But if we're going to have to go to the woods I better deal with it early.' Luckily we never had to do that."

She spent the remainder of her college education focused on photography. Though Sherman had failed a required photography class as a freshman, she repeated the course with Barbara Jo Revelle, whom she credited with introducing her to conceptual art and other contemporary forms. At college she met Robert Longo, a fellow artist who encouraged her to record her process of "dolling up" for parties. This was the beginning of her Untitled Film Stills series.

In 1974, together with Longo, Charles Clough and Nancy Dwyer, she created Hallwalls, an arts center intended as a space that would accommodate artists from diverse backgrounds. Sherman was also exposed to the contemporary art exhibited at the Albright-Knox Art Gallery, the two Buffalo campuses of the SUNY school system, Media Studies Buffalo, and the Center for Exploratory and Perceptual Arts, and Artpark, in nearby Lewiston, N.Y.

It was in Buffalo that Sherman encountered the photo-based conceptual works of artists Hannah Wilke, Eleanor Antin, and Adrian Piper. Along with artists like Laurie Simmons, Louise Lawler, and Barbara Kruger, Sherman is considered to be part of the Pictures Generation. She graduated with a BA in 1976.

== Photography ==
Sherman works in series, typically photographing herself in a range of costumes. To create her photographs, Sherman shoots alone in her studio, assuming multiple roles as author, director, make-up artist, hairstylist, wardrobe mistress, and model.

=== Early work ===
Bus Riders (1976–2000) is a series of photographs that feature the artist as a variety of meticulously observed characters. The photographs were shot in 1976 for the Bus Authority for display on a bus. Sherman used costumes and make-up, including blackface, to transform her identity for each image, and the cutout characters were lined up along the bus's advertising strip. Some critiques say that this work showed insensitivity to race through the use of blackface makeup while others state that it was rather with the intention of exposing racism embedded in society. The American theatre critic Margo Jefferson has written, "[The African-American figures] all have nearly the same features, too, while Ms. Sherman is able to give the white characters she impersonates a real range of skin tones and facial features. This didn't look like irony to me. It looked like a stale visual myth that was still in good working order."

Other early works involved cutout figures, such as the Murder Mystery and Play of Selves.

In her landmark photograph series Untitled Film Stills, (1977–80), Sherman appears as B movie and film noir actresses. When asked if she considers herself to be acting in her photographs, Sherman said, "I never thought I was acting. When I became involved with close-ups I needed more information in the expression. I couldn't depend on background or atmosphere. I wanted the story to come from the face. Somehow the acting just happened."

Many of Sherman's photo series, like the 1981 Centerfolds, call attention to stereotypes of women in society, films, television and magazines. When talking about one of her centerfold pictures Sherman stated, "In content I wanted a man opening up the magazine suddenly look at it with an expectation of something lascivious and then feel like the violator that they would be looking at this woman who is perhaps a victim. I didn't think of them as victims at the time... Obviously I'm trying to make someone feel bad for having a certain expectation".

She explained to The New York Times in 1990, "I feel I'm anonymous in my work. When I look at the pictures, I never see myself; they aren't self-portraits. Sometimes I disappear." She describes her process as intuitive, and that she responds to elements of a setting such as light, mood, location, and costume, and will continue to change external elements until she finds what she wants. She has said of her process, "I think of becoming a different person. I look into a mirror next to the camera...it's trance-like. By staring into it I try to become that character through the lens ... When I see what I want, my intuition takes over—both in the 'acting' and in the editing. Seeing that other person that's up there, that's what I want. It's like magic."

=== Untitled Film Stills ===
The series Untitled Film Stills (1977–1980), with which Cindy Sherman achieved international recognition, consists of 69 black-and-white photographs. The artist poses in different roles (librarians, hillbillies, and seductresses), and settings (streets, yards, pools, beaches, and interiors), producing a result reminiscent of stills typical of Italian neorealism or American film noir of the 1940s, 1950s and 1960s.

Sherman avoided putting titles on the images in order to preserve their ambiguity. She would often pose her heroines as alone, expressionless, and in private. An overarching characteristic of her heroines were those that did not follow conventional ideas of marriage and family; they were rebellious women who either died as that or who were later tamed by society. In this series, the gaze seems to come from another subject – "usually a man" – to highlight the concept of the male gaze.

Modest in scale compared to Sherman's later cibachrome photographs, they are all 8 1/2 by 11 inches, each displayed in identical, simple black frames. Sherman used her own possessions as props, or sometimes borrowed, as in Untitled Film Still #11 in which the doggy pillow belongs to a friend. The shots were also largely taken in her own apartment. The Untitled Film Stills fall into several distinct groups:

- The first six are grainy and slightly out of focus (e.g. Untitled #4).
- The next group was taken in 1978 at Robert Longo's family beach house on the north fork of Long Island. (Sherman met Longo in 1976 and began a relationship with him)
- Later in 1978, Sherman began taking shots in outdoor locations around the city. E.g. Untitled Film Still #21
- Sherman later returned to her apartment, preferring to work from home. She created her version of a Sophia Loren character from the movie Two Women. (E.g. Untitled Film Still #35 (1979))
- She took several photographs in the series while preparing for a road trip to Arizona with her parents. Untitled Film Still#48 (1979), also known as The Hitchhiker, was shot by Sherman's father at sunset one evening during the trip.
- The remainder of the series was shot around New York, like Untitled #54, often featuring a blonde victim typical of film noir.

The Museum of Modern Art in Manhattan purchased the series for an estimated $1 million in 1995.

Untitled Film Still #21 was listed as one of the 100 influential photographs by TIME Magazine.

=== 1980s ===
In addition to her film stills, Sherman has appropriated a number of other visual forms—the centerfold, fashion photograph, historical portrait, and soft-core sex image. These and other series, like the 1980s Fairy Tales and Disasters sequence, were shown for the first time at the Metro Pictures Gallery in New York City.

It was with her series Rear Screen Projections, 1980, that Sherman switched from black-and-white to color and to clearly larger formats. Centerfolds/Horizontals, 1981, are inspired by the center spreads in fashion and pornographic magazines. The twelve (24 by 48 inches) photographs were initially commissioned — but not used — by Artforum's Editor in Chief Ingrid Sischy for an artist's section in the magazine. She poses either on the floor or in bed, usually recumbent and often supine. About her aims with the self-portraits, Sherman has said: "Some of them I'd hope would seem very psychological. While I'm working I might feel as tormented as the person I'm portraying."

In 1982, Sherman began her Pink Robes series which includes Untitled #97, #98, #99 and #100.

In Fairy Tales, 1985, and Disasters, 1986–1989, Cindy Sherman uses visible prostheses and mannequins for the first time. Provoked by the 1989 NEA funding controversy involving photographs by Robert Mapplethorpe and Andres Serrano at the Corcoran Gallery of Art, as well as the way Jeff Koons modeled his porn star wife in his "Made in Heaven" series, Sherman produced the Sex series in 1989. For once she removed herself from the shots, as these photographs featured pieced-together medical dummies in flagrante delicto.

Between 1989 and 1990, Sherman made 35 large, color photographs restaging the settings of various European portrait paintings of the fifteenth through early 19th centuries under the title History Portraits.

Rear Screen Projections

Rear Screen Projections is a series of photographs created by Cindy Sherman in 1980. This particular body of work features herself as the model in each image, posing in front of various rear-projected landscape scenes. Sherman appears in various guises, often described as "hitchhiker" or "runaway" types. The use of rear-projected images creates a sense of artifice and theatricality, as Sherman's character seems to be placed within, but not truly a part of, the depicted landscape. The settings range from mundane roadside scenes to more exotic, dreamlike vistas.

The series is seen as a continuation of themes explored in Sherman's earlier work Untitled Film Stills (1977-1980), particularly the exploration of female stereotypes and the construction of identity through photography. However, Rear Screen Projections differs in its overt use of artifice, drawing attention to the constructed nature of the image.

This body of work is considered a significant series in Sherman's oeuvre, bridging her early work with her later, more elaborate series. It's recognized for its innovative use of rear projection and its continued exploration of themes of identity, representation, and the constructed nature of reality. [11] The series has been influential on subsequent generations of photographers and artists working with constructed photography and staged self-portraiture.

Fairy Tales

Fairy Tales is a series of photographs created by Cindy Sherman in 1985. The series marks a significant departure from her earlier work, such as the Untitled Film Stills, in its overt engagement with grotesque and abject imagery.

In Fairy Tales, Sherman transforms herself into a cast of disturbing and often repulsive characters, drawing inspiration from classic fairy tales, though not illustrating specific narratives. The photographs feature Sherman in elaborate costumes and makeup, often surrounded by decaying props, discarded objects, and unsettling environments. The images evoke a sense of decay, horror, and psychological distress, subverting the traditional, idealized representations of fairy tale characters.

The series is characterized by its use of vivid color, theatrical staging, and a focus on the grotesque. Sherman employs prosthetics, masks, and other theatrical devices to create monstrous and deformed figures, challenging conventional notions of beauty and femininity.

=== 1990s ===
==== Sex Pictures ====
Sherman uses prosthetic limbs and mannequins to create her Sex Pictures series (1992). Hal Foster, an American art critic, describes Sherman's Sex Pictures in his article Obscene, Abject, Traumatic as "[i]n this scheme of things the impulse to erode the subject and to tear at the screen has driven Sherman [...] to her recent work, where it is obliterated by the gaze."

Reviewer Jerry Saltz told New York magazine that Sherman's work is "[f]ashioned from dismembered and recombined mannequins, some adorned with pubic hair, one posed with a tampon in vagina, another with sausages being excreted from vulva, this was anti-porn porn, the unsexiest sex pictures ever made, visions of feigning, fighting, perversion. ... Today, I think of Cindy Sherman as an artist who only gets better."

Greg Fallis of Utata Tribal Photography describes Sherman's Sex Pictures series and her work as follows: "With her Sex Pictures, Sherman posed medical prostheses in sexualized positions, recreating—and strangely modifying—pornography. An example of this can be seen in her work entitled Untitled,#264. Sherman displays herself with a body made of prosthetic. Her face is the only part of her that shows but is covered by a gas mask meant to emphasize the parts of the female body that tend to be over-sexualized.

=== Society Portraits ===
The Society Portraits is a series of photographs created by Cindy Sherman in 2008. The series features Sherman posing as wealthy, older women.

In Society Portraits, Sherman embodies a range of aging, affluent women. The portraits are characterized by their elaborate costumes, styled hair, and heavy makeup. The women are often adorned with jewelry and designer clothing, and posed in luxurious, though somewhat sterile, settings. Despite the trappings of wealth, the portraits often convey a sense of loneliness, vulnerability, and anxiety. Sherman employs digital manipulation in this series, enhancing wrinkles, sagging skin, and other signs of aging, contributing to the overall effect of unease.

=== 2000s ===
Between 2003 and 2004, Sherman produced the Clowns cycle, where the use of digital photography enabled her to create chromatically garish backdrops and montages of numerous characters. Set against opulent backdrops and presented in ornate frames, the characters in Sherman's 2008 untitled Society Portraits are not based on specific women, but the artist has made them look entirely familiar in their struggle with the standards of beauty that prevail in a youth- and status-obsessed culture.

=== 2010s ===
"I'm trying to erase myself more than identify myself or
reveal myself. That's a big, confusing thing that people have
with my work: they think I'm trying to reveal these secret
fantasies or something. It's really about obliterating
myself within these characters."

— Cindy Sherman

Her exhibition at the Museum of Modern Art in 2012 presented a photographic mural (2010–11) accompanied by films selected by Sherman. In this mural, she photoshopped her face with a decorative backdrop to transform herself into a fictitious environment. Along with other characters, Sherman toys with the idea of reality and fantasy together. Based on a 32-page insert Sherman did for POP using vintage clothes from Chanel's archive, a more recent series of large-scale pictures from 2012 depict outsized enigmatic female figures standing in striking isolation before ominous painterly landscapes the artist had photographed in Iceland during the 2010 eruptions of Eyjafjallajökull and on the isle of Capri.

In 2017, she collaborated on a "selfie" project with W Magazine that was based on the concept of the "plandid", or "the planned candid photograph". Sherman utilized a variety of photo-correction apps to create her Instagram portraits.

From 2019 she showed self-portraits executed as tapestries by a Belgian workshop.

=== Fashion ===
Sherman's career has also included several fashion series, including designs for Prada, Dolce & Gabbana, and Marc Jacobs. In 1983, fashion designer and retailer Dianne Benson commissioned her to create a series of advertisements for her store, Dianne B., that appeared in several issues of Interview magazine. Untitled #122 from this collection was especially iconic; by working to deemphasise the clothing, she played with the conventions of fashion photography popular at this time. Sherman also created photographs for an editorial in Harper's Bazaar in 1993. In 1994, she produced the Post Card Series for Comme des Garçons for the brand's autumn/winter 1994–95 collections in collaboration with Rei Kawakubo.

In 2006, Sherman created a series of fashion advertisements for designer Marc Jacobs. The advertisements themselves were photographed by Juergen Teller and released as a monograph by Rizzoli. For Balenciaga, Sherman created the six-image series Cindy Sherman: Untitled (Balenciaga) in 2008; they were first shown to the public in 2010. Also in 2010, Sherman collaborated with Anna Hu on a design for a piece of jewelry. She returned to working with Teller on Marc Jacobs' Spring/Summer 2024 campaign.

== Music and films ==
In the early 1990s, Sherman worked with Minneapolis band Babes in Toyland, providing photographs for covers for the albums Fontanelle and Painkillers, creating a stage backdrop used in live concerts, and acting in the promotional video for the song "Bruise Violet." She also worked as a film director.

Sherman moved from photographs to film with her movie Office Killer in 1997, starring Jeanne Tripplehorn, Molly Ringwald and Carol Kane. Dorine, played by Carol Kane, is a stand-in for Sherman. They have a shared interest in arranging bodies, like a puppeteer, in diorama-like scenes. According to author Dahlia Schweitzer, Office Killer is full of unexpected characters and plot twists. Schweitzer considers the film to be a comedy, horror, melodrama, noir, feminist statement, and an art piece. Echoing similar grisly and gory elements as her Untitled Horror series, the film includes several artistically executed murder scenes. Office Killer grossed $37,446 and received generally poor reviews, which called the film "crude" and "laugh-free." In a review for The New York Times, art critic Roberta Smith states that the film lacks the artist's usual finesse and is a retrospective of her work – "a fascinating if lumpish bit of Shermaniana." Movie critic colleague to Roberta Smith, Stephen Holden, called the film "sadly inept."

Later, she had a cameo role in John Waters' film Pecker, and also appeared in The Feature in 2008, starring ex-husband Michel Auder, which won a New Vision Award.

In 2009, Paul Hasegawa-Overacker and Tom Donahue completed a feature documentary, Guest of Cindy Sherman, about the former's relationship with Sherman. She was initially supportive, but later opposed the project.

In the catalog essay by Philipp Kaiser for Sherman's 2016 exhibition at the Metro Pictures Gallery, he mentioned six short films that Sherman made while in college, and how they were the precursors that eventually led to Office Killer being created. The catalog also includes a conversation between Sherman and the director of the exhibit, Sofia Coppola, in which Sherman admits that she may star in an upcoming film project.

== Exhibitions ==
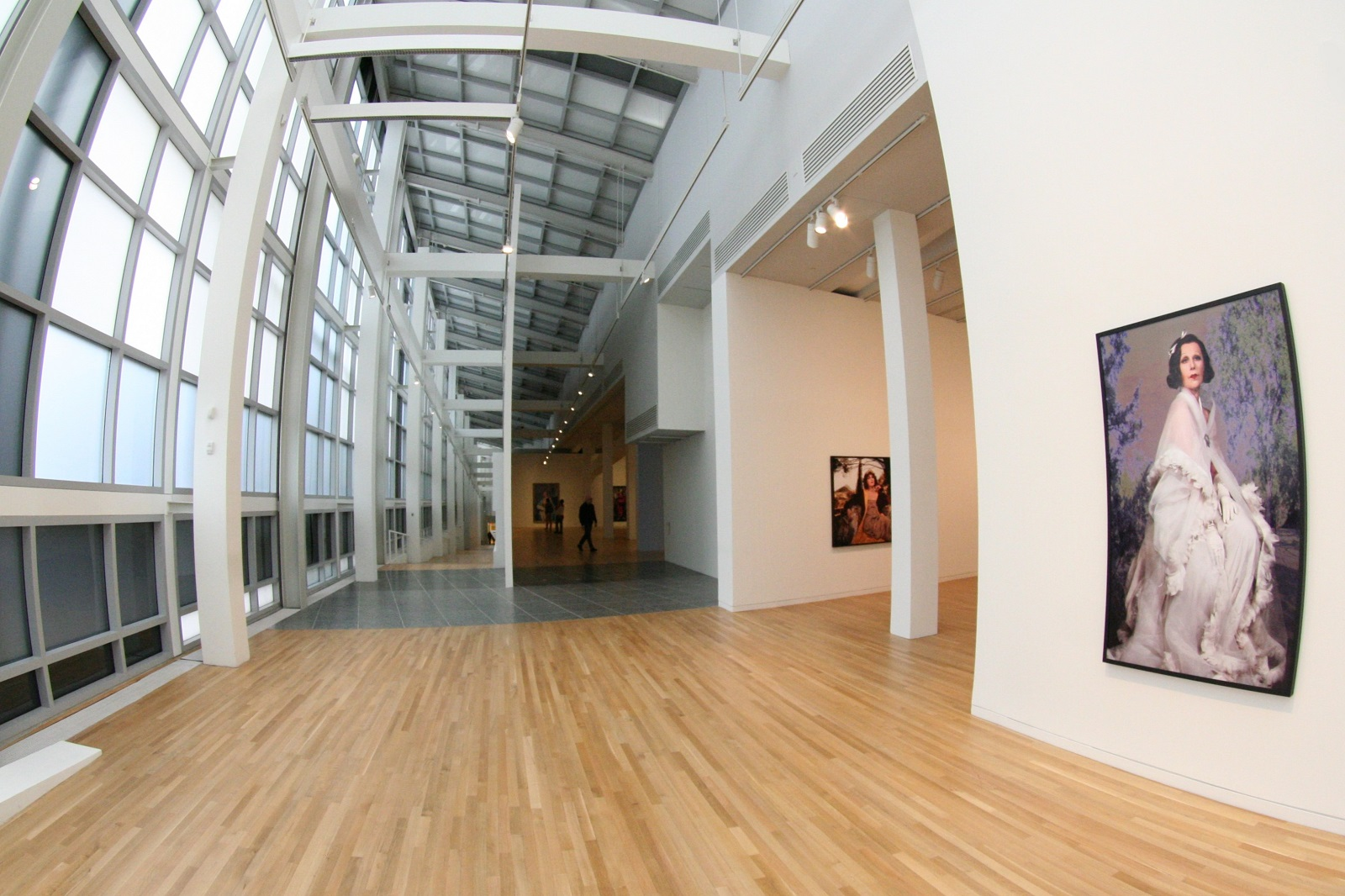
A work by Sherman displayed in the Wexner Center for the Arts

Sherman's first solo show in New York was presented at a noncommercial space The Kitchen in 1980. When the Metro Pictures Gallery opened later that year, Sherman's photographs were the first show. "Untitled Film Stills" were shown first at the non-profit gallery Artists Space where Sherman was working as a receptionist. Her first solo exhibitions in France were presented by Galerie Chantal Crousel in Paris.

Sherman has since participated in many international events, including SITE Santa Fe (2004); the Venice Biennale (1982, 1995); and five Whitney Biennials. In addition to numerous group exhibitions, Sherman's work was the subject of solo exhibitions at the Stedelijk Museum in Amsterdam (1982), Whitney Museum of American Art in New York (1987), Kunsthalle Basel (1991), Hirshhorn Museum and Sculpture Garden in Washington, D.C. (1995), the San Francisco Museum of Modern Art (1998), the Serpentine Gallery in London and the Scottish National Gallery of Modern Art (2003), and Martin-Gropius-Bau in Berlin (2007), among others. Major traveling retrospectives of Sherman's work have been organized by the Museum Boymans-van Beuningen in Rotterdam (1996); the Museum of Contemporary Art, Los Angeles and the Museum of Modern Art in New York (1997), which was sponsored by Madonna; and Kunsthaus Bregenz, Austria, Louisiana Museum for Moderne Kunst, Denmark, and Jeu de Paume in Paris (2006–2007). In 2009, Sherman was included in the seminal show "The Pictures Generation, 1974–1984" at the Metropolitan Museum of Art.

In 2012, the Museum of Modern Art mounted Cindy Sherman, a show that chronicled Sherman's work from the mid-1970s on and include more than 170 photographs. The exhibition travelled to the San Francisco Museum of Modern Art and the Walker Art Center in Minneapolis. In 2013, Sherman was invited to organize a show within that year's Venice Biennale.

In 2016, after a sabbatical from her studio which was spent "coming to terms with health issues and getting older," Sherman produced and staged her first photo gallery in five years. The series, "The Imitation of Life," named after a 1959 melodrama by Douglas Sirk, tackles aging by presenting Sherman in highly stylized glamour portraits inspired by the divas of old Hollywood, such as Gloria Swanson, Mary Pickford, and Ruby Keeler. The series was exhibited in 2016 at the Metro Pictures Gallery in New York City, and also at the Broad Museum in Los Angeles. In 2017 it was shown at the Spruth Magers gallery in Berlin, Germany, and at the Wexner Center for the Arts in Columbus, Ohio.

In 2019, the National Portrait Gallery, London, organized a major retrospective of Sherman's works from the mid-1970s to the present. In 2024, at the Goulandris Museum of Cycladic Art, Athens, Sherman's first exhibition in Greece was held, gathering together over a hundred of her early works.

In 2024, Cindy Sherman exhibited Tapestries at Fotografiska Stockholm, presenting a series of tapestries based on her digitally altered Instagram selfies, marking her first major exploration of this medium.

== Feminism ==
In Sherman's Imitation of Life series of 2016 she poses, in vintage costume and theatrical makeup, as a variety of ageing actress-like women.

When writing about Sherman's "Film Stills" in the journal October, the scholar Douglas Crimp states that Sherman's work is "a hybrid of photography and performance art that reveals femininity to be an effect of representation."

However, Sherman does not consider her work or herself to be feminist, stating "The work is what it is and hopefully it's seen as feminist work, or feminist-advised work, but I'm not going to go around espousing theoretical bullshit about feminist stuff."

Many scholars emphasize the relationship Cindy Sherman's work has with the concept of the gaze. In particular, scholars like Laura Mulvey have analyzed Sherman's Untitled series in relation to the male gaze. In a 1991 essay on Sherman, Mulvey states that ″the accouterments of the feminine struggle to conform to a facade of desirability haunt Sherman's iconography,″ which functions as a parody of different voyeurisms captured by the camera.

Others question whether this confrontation with the male gaze and a feminine struggle was an intentional consideration of Sherman's, and whether this intentionality is important in considering the feminist standpoint of Sherman's photography.

Sherman herself has identified an uncertainty toward the Untitled series' relationship with the male gaze. In a 1991 interview with David Brittain in Creative Camera, Sherman said that "I didn't really analyze it at the time as far as knowing that I was commenting upon some feminist issue. The theories weren't there at all... But now I can look back on some of them, and I think some of them are a little blatantly obvious, too much like the original pin-up pictures of those times, so I have mixed feelings about them now as a whole series."

In addition to questions of the gaze, Sherman's work is also given feminist analysis in the context of abjection. Scholars like Hal Foster and Laura Mulvey interpret Sherman's use of the abject via the grotesque in 1980s projects like Vomit Pictures as de-fetishizing the female body.

Scholar Michele Meager interprets Sherman as having been "crowned a resistant celebrity" to feminist theory.

== Art market ==
In 2010, Sherman's nearly six foot tall chromogenic color print Untitled#153 (1985), featuring the artist as a mud-caked corpse, was sold by Phillips de Pury & Company for $2.7 million, near the $3 million high estimate. In 2011, a print of Untitled#96 fetched $3.89 million at Christie's, making it the most expensive photograph at that time.

Sherman was represented by Metro Pictures for 40 years and also by Sprüth Magers before moving to Hauser & Wirth in 2021.

In April 2023, Phillips NY auctioned the 159 cm x 359 cm sized-Untitled #546 (2010) for a well above-estimate $355,600.

== Influence on contemporary artists ==
Sherman's work is often credited as a major influence for contemporary portrait photographers. One such photographer is Ryan Trecartin, who manipulates themes of identity in his videos and photography. Her influence stretches to artists in other art mediums, including painter Lisa Yuskavage, visual artist Jillian Mayer, and performance artist Tracey Ullman. British musician Billy Bragg released a song on his 1991 album Don't Try This at Home called "Cindy of 1000 Lives", dedicated to the artist and her work.

In April 2014, actor and artist James Franco exhibited a series of photographs at the Pace Gallery called New Film Stills, in which Franco restaged twenty-nine images from Sherman's Untitled Film Stills. The exhibit garnered mainly negative reviews, calling Franco's appropriations 'sophomoric,' 'sexist,' and 'embarrassingly clueless.'

== Personal life ==
Sherman lived with artist Robert Longo, from 1974 to 1980, who also included her in his 'Men in the Cities' series of photographs. She married director Michel Auder in 1984, making her stepmother to Auder's daughter, Alexandra, and her half-sister Gaby Hoffmann. They divorced in 1999. She was then in a 5-year relationship with Paul Hasegawa-Overacker, creator of a documentary film about Sherman. From 2007 to 2011, she had a relationship with the artist David Byrne.

Between 1991 and 2005, Sherman lived in a fifth-floor co-op loft at 84 Mercer Street in Manhattan's Soho neighborhood; she later sold it to actor Hank Azaria. She bought two floors in a 10-story condo building overlooking the Hudson River in West Soho, and currently uses one as her apartment and the other as her studio and office.

For many years, Sherman spent her summers in the Catskill Mountains. In 2000, she bought songwriter Marvin Hamlisch's 4,200-square-foot house on 0.4 acre in Sag Harbor for $1.5 million. She later acquired a 19th-century home on a ten-acre waterfront property on Accabonac Harbor in East Hampton, New York.

Sherman has expressed contempt for social media platforms, calling them "so vulgar."

== Industry and advocacy work ==
Sherman serves on the artistic advisory committee of the New York City-based Stephen Petronio Company and on the Artists Committee of the Americans for the Arts. Along with David Byrne, she was a member of Portugal's Estoril Film Festival's jury in 2009.

In 2012, she joined Yoko Ono and nearly 150 fellow artists in the founding of Artists Against Fracking, a group in opposition to hydraulic fracturing to remove gas from underground deposits.

In 2023, Sherman served on the jury that chose Sarah Lucas as first winner of the New Museum's $400,000 Hostetler/Wrigley Sculpture Award.

Ahead of the 2024 United States presidential election, Sherman was one of 165 leading contemporary artists who contributed pieces to Artists for Kamala, an online sale with all proceeds raised going directly to Kamala Harris' campaign.

== Publications ==
- Inverted Odysseys: Claude Cahun, Maya Deren, Cindy Sherman. MIT Press, 1999. Edited by Shelley Rice. ISBN 0-262-68106-4.
- Essential, The: Cindy Sherman. Harry N. Abrams, Inc., 1999. ISBN 0-8109-5808-2.
- Cindy Sherman: Retrospective (Paperback). Thames & Hudson, 2000. By Amanda Cruz and Elizabeth A. T. Smith. ISBN 0-500-27987-X.
- In Real Life: Six Women Photographers. Holiday House, 2000. By Leslie Sills, et al. ISBN 0-8234-1498-1.
- Early Work of Cindy Sherman. Glenn Horowitz Bookseller, 2001 ISBN 0-9654020-3-7.
- Cindy Sherman: Photographic Works 1975-1995 (Paperback). Schirmer/Mosel, 2002. By Elisabeth Bronfen, et al. ISBN 3-88814-809-X.
- Cindy Sherman: The Complete Untitled Film Stills. Museum of Modern Art, 2003. ISBN 0-87070-507-5.
- Cindy Sherman: Centerfolds. Skarstedt Fine Art, 2004. ISBN 0-9709090-2-0.
- Cindy Sherman: Working Girl. St. Louis, Missouri: Contemporary Art Museum St. Louis, 2006. ISBN 978-0-9712195-8-8.
- Cindy Sherman. The MIT Press, 2006. Edited by Johanna Burton. ISBN 0-262-52463-5.
- Cindy Sherman: A Play of Selves. Hatje Cantz, 2007. ISBN 978-3-7757-1942-1.
- Cindy Sherman. Museum of Modern Art, 2012. ISBN 0870708120.
- Cindy Sherman: Untitled Horrors. Hatje Cantz, 2013. ISBN 978-3-7757-3487-5.
- Cindy Sherman's Office Killer: Another Kind of Monster. Intellect Books, 2014. By Dahlia Schweitzer. ISBN 1841507075.

== Films ==
- Office Killer (1997)
- Pecker (1998)
- Cindy Sherman [videorecording] : Transformations. by Paul Tschinkel; Marc H Miller; Sarah Berry; Stan Harrison; Cindy Sherman; Helen Winer; Peter Schjeldahl; Inner-Tube Video. 2002, 28 minutes, Color. NY: Inner-Tube Video.
- The Feature (2008)
- Cindy Sherman segment in 30/30 Vision: 3 Decades of Strand Releasing (2019)

== Awards and other recognition ==
- 1981: Artist-in-residence, Light Work, Syracuse, New York
- 1994: Larry Aldrich Foundation Award
- 1995: MacArthur Fellowship
- 1997: Wolfgang Hahn Prize
- 1999: Hasselblad Award from the Hasselblad Foundation
- 2001: National Arts Award
- 2003: American Academy of Arts and Sciences Award
- 2005: Guild Hall Academy of the Arts Lifetime Achievement Award for Visual Arts
- 2009: Jewish Museum's Man Ray Award
- 2009: International Artist Award from Anderson Ranch Arts Center, Snowmass Village, Colorado.
- 2010: Honorary Member of the Royal Academy of Arts, London
- 2012: Roswitha Haftmann Prize
- 2012: Honored by actor Steve Martin at the 10th anniversary Gala in the Garden at the Hammer Museum
- 2012: Sherman was among the artists whose works were given as trophies to the filmmakers of winning pictures in the 2012 Tribeca Film Festival's jury competitions
- 2013: Honorary doctorate degree from the Royal College of Art, London
- 2016: Praemium Imperiale
- 2017: Induction into the International Photography Hall of Fame and Museum
- 2020: Wolf Prize in Art
- 2024: Golden Plate Award of the American Academy of Achievement, presented by Awards Council member Jeff Koons

== Collections ==
Works by Sherman are held in the following collections:

- Art Institute of Chicago, Chicago, IL
- The Broad, Los Angeles, CA
- Jewish Museum (Manhattan), New York, NY
- Madison Museum of Contemporary Art, Madison, WI
- Menil Collection, Houston, TX
- Metropolitan Museum of Art, New York, NY
- Museum of Fine Arts, Houston, Houston, TX
- Museum of Modern Art, New York, NY
- Tate Modern, Bankside, London

== See also ==
- Self-portraiture
- Blackface in contemporary art
- Laurel Nakadate
- List of most expensive photographs
- Nikki S. Lee
