= Justin Aversano =

American artist (born 1992)

- Born: 1992 (age 33–34)
- Occupations: Photographer, digital artist
- Years active: 2012–present
- Known for: Twin Flames NFT series, SaveArtSpace co-founder
- Notable work: Twin Flames series, Every Day is a Gift

Justin Aversano (born,1992) is an American multidisciplinary artist, creative director, CEO, and portrait photographer.

== Biography ==
In 2014, Aversano earned a Bachelor of Fine Arts degree in photography from the School of Visual Arts (SVA) in New York. The following year, he joined forces with another SVA graduate, Travis Rix, with whom he co-founded SaveArtSpace, a non-profit organization dedicated to bringing community art to public spaces. Its projects feature art in public advertising spaces, including billboards, phone booths, bus terminals, and digital screens. Its past projects include a 2017 New York exhibition titled "SaveArtSpace: The Future Is Female" and a 2021 collaboration in which 100 CryptoPunks artworks were displayed in Miami.

== Works ==
In 2021, Aversano created his Twin Flames series, "A photographic exploration of the phenomenology of twins."

=== Twin Flames ===
Twin Flames debuted in 2018 as a collection of traditional photographs. By 2021, it became the first non-fungible token (NFT) lot to be offered for bid in a photography auction. Twin Flames #83, Bahareh & Farzaneh, accompanied by Twin Flames Full Physical Collection, 2017-2018, was sold at auction for $1.1 million, becoming the most expensive photographic NFT ever sold at the time.

Averano attempted to sell the originals to a collector but was, instead, advised to keep them to sell later, but release them as NFTs. the in Over a five month period he sold all 100, earning him $130,000, with the possibility of continuing to earn royalties. #49 in the series sold again in November 2021 for $3,781,159, making Aversano the fourth highest selling living photographer.

== Solo exhibitions ==
- "Twin Flames", Superchief Gallery, Ridgeway, New York, May 18-31, 2019

== Other ventures ==
Aversano is co-founder of art charity, Save Art Space, and a business, Quantum NFT Marketplace.
