= Rhein II =

Photograph by Andreas Gurksy

- Artist: Andreas Gursky
- Year: 1999
- Type: Photograph
- Medium: C-print mounted to acrylic glass
- Dimensions: 190 cm × 360 cm (73 in × 143 in);
- Owner: Anonymous

Rhein II is a colour photograph made by German visual artist Andreas Gursky in 1999. In the image, a river (the Lower Rhine) flows horizontally across the field of view, between flat green fields, under an overcast sky. Extraneous details such as dog walkers and a factory building were removed by the artist using digital editing.

In 2011, a print was auctioned for $4.3 million (then £2.7m), making it the most expensive photograph sold. Rhein II held the record until 2022, when its price was exceeded by Le Violon d'Ingres.

== Production ==
The photograph was produced as the second (and largest) of a set of six depicting the river Rhine. In the image, the Lower Rhine flows horizontally across the field of view, between flat green fields, under an overcast sky. It was taken near Düsseldorf, at a location Gursky had previously photographed in 1996. Dissatisfied with his earlier image, Gursky "thought about whether I ought perhaps to change my viewpoint ... In the end I decided to digitalise the pictures and leave out the elements that bothered me".

Extraneous details such as dog walkers and a factory building were removed by the artist using digital editing. Justifying this manipulation of the image, Gursky said "Paradoxically, this view of the Rhine cannot be obtained in situ, a fictitious construction was required to provide an accurate image of a modern river." Gursky produced a very large chromogenic colour print of the photograph, mounted it onto acrylic glass, and then placed it in a frame. The image itself measures 73 by 143 inches (190 cm × 360 cm), while the frame measures 81 by 151 inches (210 cm × 380 cm).

== Reception and sale ==
The print was originally acquired by the Galerie Monika Sprüth in Cologne, and subsequently bought by an anonymous German collector. The collector sold the print by auction at Christie's New York on 8 November 2011, who estimated it would fetch a price of $2.5–3.5m. It actually sold for $4,338,500 (then about £2.7m); the identity of the buyer has not been revealed.

The work has been described by arts writer Florence Waters in The Daily Telegraph as a "vibrant, beautiful and memorable – I should say unforgettable – contemporary twist on [...] the romantic landscape" and by journalist Maev Kennedy in The Guardian as "a sludgy image of the grey Rhine under grey skies".

== Public collections ==
Gursky's fifth print of the photograph, which is identical but slightly smaller at 156.4 cm × 308.3 cm (61.6 in × 121.4 in), was acquired in 2000 by Tate, a British group of art museums. It remains in their collection but is not on public display. Another print of the same size is held at the Museum of Modern Art, in New York; it is also not on public display.

== See also ==
- List of most expensive photographs
