= Rhain =

Rhain may refer to:

Wales

- Rhain ap Cadwgan or Cloten (fl. 8th century), King of Dyfed and Brycheiniog
- Rhain ap Maredudd (died c. 808), king of Rhainwg (Dyfed)
- Rhain the Irishman (Rhain Yscot) (fl. 11th-century), Irish pretender who held Dyfed

England

- RHAIN, former stage name of musician Rhian Teasdale

Slovenia

- Rhain or Rain is an ancient form of the former German name Rann of the town of Brežice and Brežice Castle (Schloss Rhain, or Schloss Rann)
