= Untitled 96 =

1981 photograph by Cindy Sherman

Untitled #96
- Artist: Cindy Sherman
- Year: 1981
- Type: Photograph
- Medium: Chromogenic color print
- Dimensions: 61 cm × 120 cm (24 in × 48 in)

Untitled #96 is a color photograph made by American visual artist Cindy Sherman in 1981. It is part of her Centerfolds series of twelve pictures. The photograph depicts Sherman portraying a young teenage girl lying on a linoleum floor, wearing an orange sweater and a short skirt, clutching a scrap of newspaper. The work is known for its psychological ambiguity and its subversion of the magazine centerfold format. It has become one of the most widely discussed photographs in Sherman's career and a significant work in the history of feminist art photography.

== Description ==
The photograph depicts the artist portraying a young teenage girl with short blonde hair, lying on a linoleum floor, wearing an orange sweater and a short skirt, as she clutches a scrap of newspaper. Cindy Sherman explained about the composition: "I was thinking of a young girl who may have been cleaning the kitchen for her mother and who ripped something out of the newspaper, something asking 'Are you lonely?' or 'Do you want to be friends?' or 'Do you want to go on a vacation?' She's cleaning the floor, she rips this out and she's thinking about it."

== Interpretations and analysis ==
Art historian Gwen Allen has analyzed the significance of the girl's sideways pose and the newspaper clipping she holds, arguing that these details suggest a possible story without ever fully explaining it, as if inviting viewers to imagine their own narrative. Allen argues that the photograph creates a sense of narrative openness, in which viewers are invited to imagine what the girl is thinking or feeling, but the image deliberately withholds any definitive answer.

Critics have similarly noted that viewers tend to read emotion into the girl's face even though her expression never fully reveals her inner state, and that the newspaper clipping functions as a clue to an unseen story, a device Sherman uses to engage the viewer's imagination while refusing to satisfy it. This ambiguity is central to Sherman's practice across the Centerfolds series, in which the figures resist being fully understood.

The series uses the centerfold format, traditionally associated with the objectification of women, to challenge expectations about female representation, presenting figures absorbed in private psychological states rather than posed for the viewer's pleasure.

== Background ==
The Centerfolds series originated as a commission from Ingrid Sischy, editor of the art magazine Artforum, who invited Sherman to create images for the magazine's centerfold pages. Sherman produced twelve large-format horizontal photographs in 1981. Artforum ultimately never published the series. The exhibition catalog for Sherman's major retrospective at the Museum of Contemporary Art, Los Angeles explains that the Centerfolds were originally produced for this proposed portfolio, and that Sherman's choice of the centerfold format was a deliberate response to the visual conventions of mass media imagery.

Lisa Phillips, writing in the Skarstedt Fine Art catalogue, describes the figures in these photographs as emotionally ambiguous and often vulnerable rather than seductive, specifically identifying the figure in Untitled #96 as "the pixie schoolgirl in a plaid skirt lying on an orange formica floor holding a letter."

== Art market ==
On 11 May 2011, a print was auctioned for US$$3,890,500, at Christie's, the highest price paid for a photograph back then, though the price has since been surpassed. The Christie's catalogue situates this record price within the photograph's broader critical reception as a work that challenged conventions of gender and representation, emphasizing the tension created by the girl's pose and expression as central to its critical significance. Another print was sold for $2,882,500 at Christie's New York on 8 May 2012.

== Public collections ==
There are prints of the photograph at the Museum of Modern Art, in New York, The Art Institute of Chicago, and the Museum Boijmans Van Beuningen, in Rotterdam.

== See also ==
- List of most expensive photographs
