= Chicago Board of Trade II =

Photograph by Andreas Gurksy

Chicago Board of Trade II is a colour photograph by German artist Andreas Gursky made in 1999. It was created following his usual process of taking several pictures of the same subject and then manipulating and merging the scanned results by computer.

== Description and analysis ==
The picture of large variable dimensions presents the floor of the Chicago Board of Trade, where a large number of brokers, of different jacket colours, are seen in groups around several banks of monitors. The surrounding areas, which appeared in the first version, were cropped in this one. The image is deliberately blurred. Gursky achieved the sense of movement by using the double exposure of several sections of the picture. The image gives us a sense of the voracity of the world of broad of trades and of the contemporary capitalist world. Tate Modern website describes it: "Rather than being a straight depiction of the trading floor as a place, Gursky’s image seems to depict the brash, exuberant and unfathomable activity of the stock market as a global phenomenon." The overall pattern seems reminiscent of the abstract expressionist painting, in particular of Jackson Pollock.

A new version of the picture, Chicago, Board of Trade III (1999-2009) would be sold by $3,298,755 at Sotheby's, London, on 26 June 2013.

== Public collections ==
This picture had a six copies edition, two of which are at the Tate Modern, in London. There are also prints at the Kunstmuseum, in Bonn, the Museum of Contemporary Art, in Chicago, and at the Zabludowicz Collection.
