= Moody (crater) =

Crater on Mercury

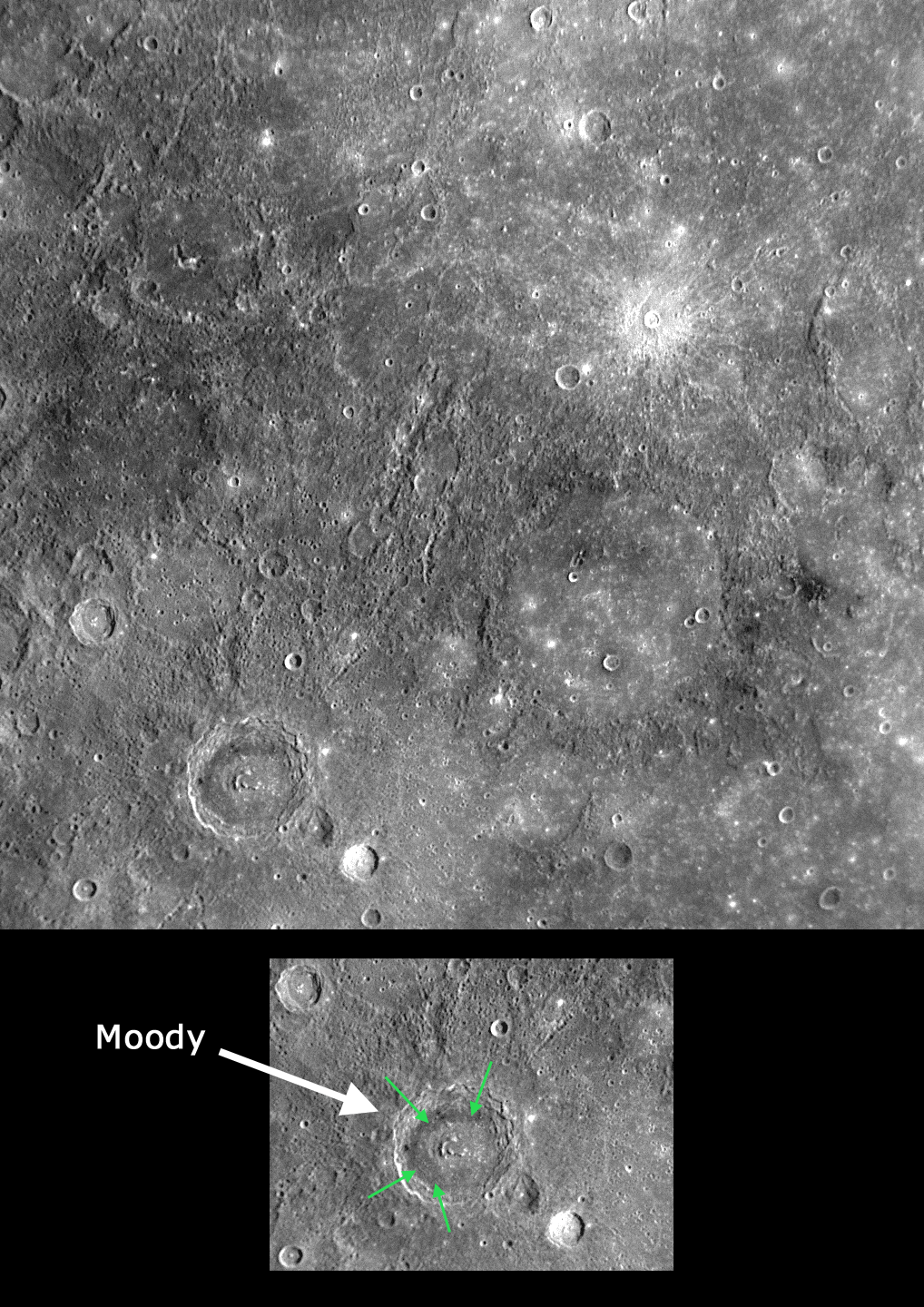
- Feature type: Impact crater
- Location: Tolstoj quadrangle, Mercury
- Coordinates: 13.21°S 215.15°W
- Diameter: 83 km (52 mi)
- Eponym: Ronald Moody

Moody is an impact crater on Mercury.

Moody features a complex central peak and an annulus of dark material on its outer floor. The area inward of the dark ring appears reddish in enhanced color wide angle camera images acquired by the MESSENGER spacecraft, indicating the presence of material different in composition from that of either the dark material or the crater's immediate surroundings. Dark material has been found associated with other craters on Mercury, including Munch and Poe. Moody is somewhat unusual for having its dark ring confined to the crater floor, rather than forming the crater rim as at Munch and Poe.

The crater was named in November 2008 after Jamaican sculptor and painter Ronald Moody.

To the northeast of Moody is an unnamed peak ring basin, one of 110 on Mercury.

== Views ==
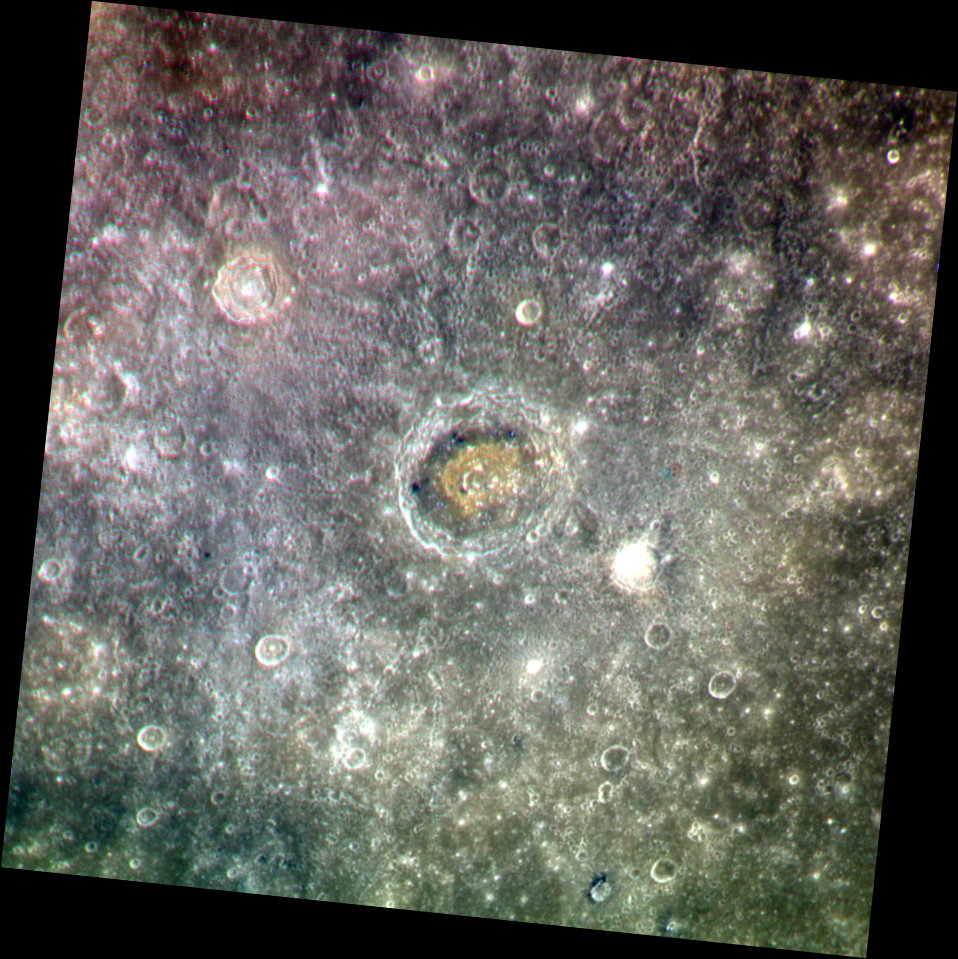
Approximate color image of Moody (center)

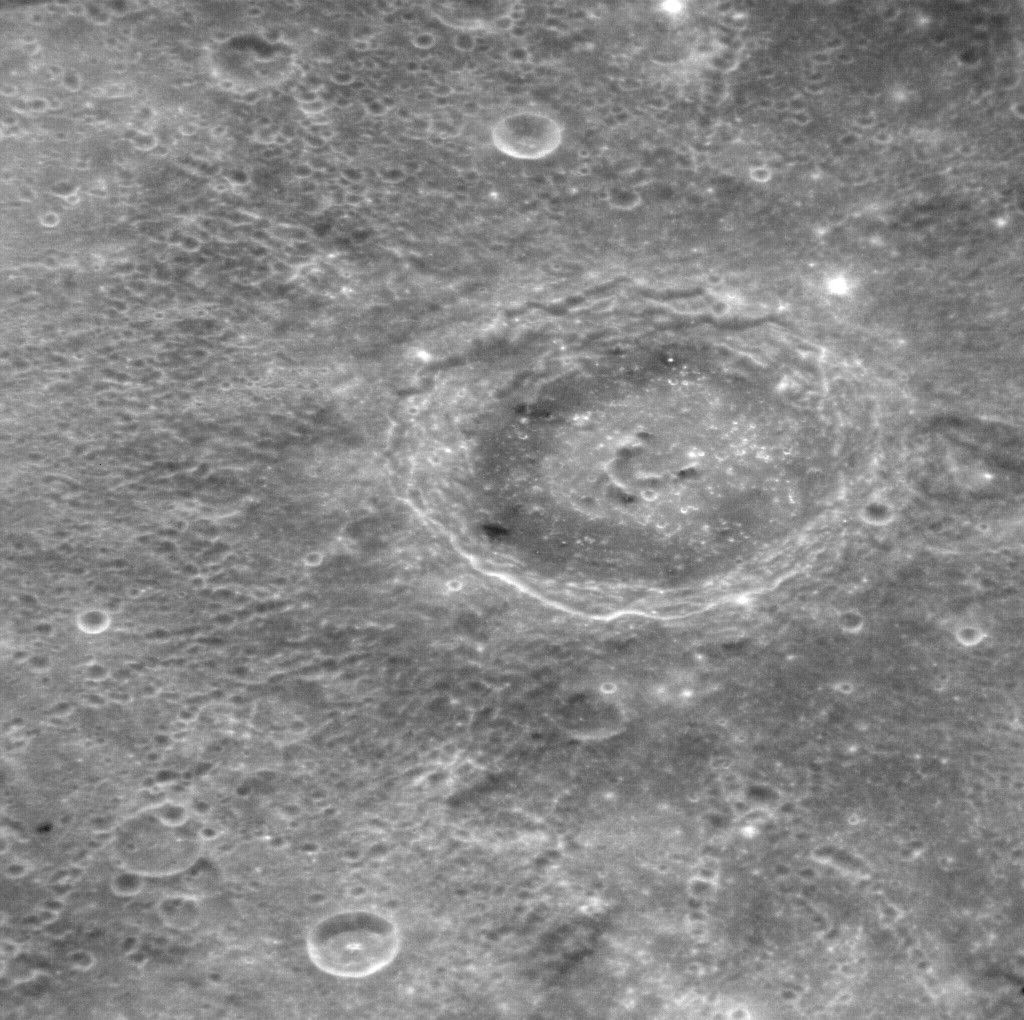
Note the unusual ring of dark floor material around the central peak

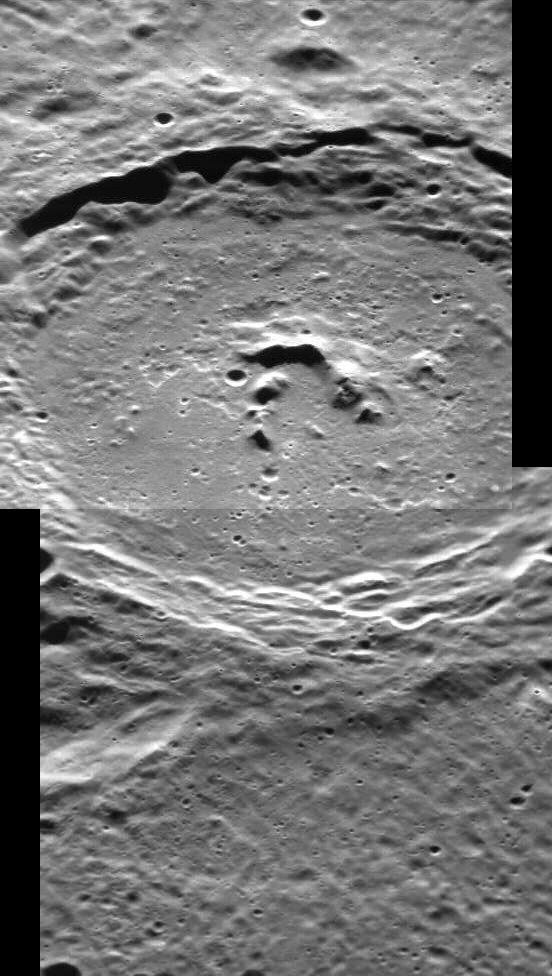
Oblique view of Moody crater
