= Working Students =

Photograph by August Sander

Working Students is a black and white photograph by German photographer August Sander, taken in 1926. The photograph depicts a group of four students, who also worked for a living, from the Weimar Republic. It was included in his photography landmark book Antlitz der Zeit (1929), and became one of the most famous pictures that Sander took back then.

== History and description ==
The picture depicts four young men seated, who are, from left to right, Erich Sander, the photographers son, and a philosophy student, and three of his friends, Richard Kreutzberg, Hans Schoemann, and Georg Hansen, all politically involved as members of the Communist Party of Germany. They would all meet different fates. Sander was imprisoned by the Nazi regimen in 1934 and died ten years later, still in custody, Kreutzberg took his own life in 1933, the same year the Nazis seized power, Schoemann would be a member of the German resistance during World War II, and Hansen was arrested in London, in 1932, on charges of espionage for the Soviet Union.

The four friends are seated closely and look directly at the camera. They all seem relaxed and wear fine suits, with ties. Their closeness and committed expressions seems to reflect their common political and social ideology, goals and purposes.

== Art market ==
A print of the photograph was sold by $493,000 at Sotheby's New York, on 7 April 2008, making it then the highest price for one of the artist works.

== Public collections ==
There are prints of the photograph at the August Sander Archive, in Cologne, the Walther Collection, the Moderna Museet, in Stockholm, the Museum of Modern Art, in New York, and the J. Paul Getty Museum, in Los Angeles.
