= Deutsches Fotoinstitut =

Germany's national photography institute

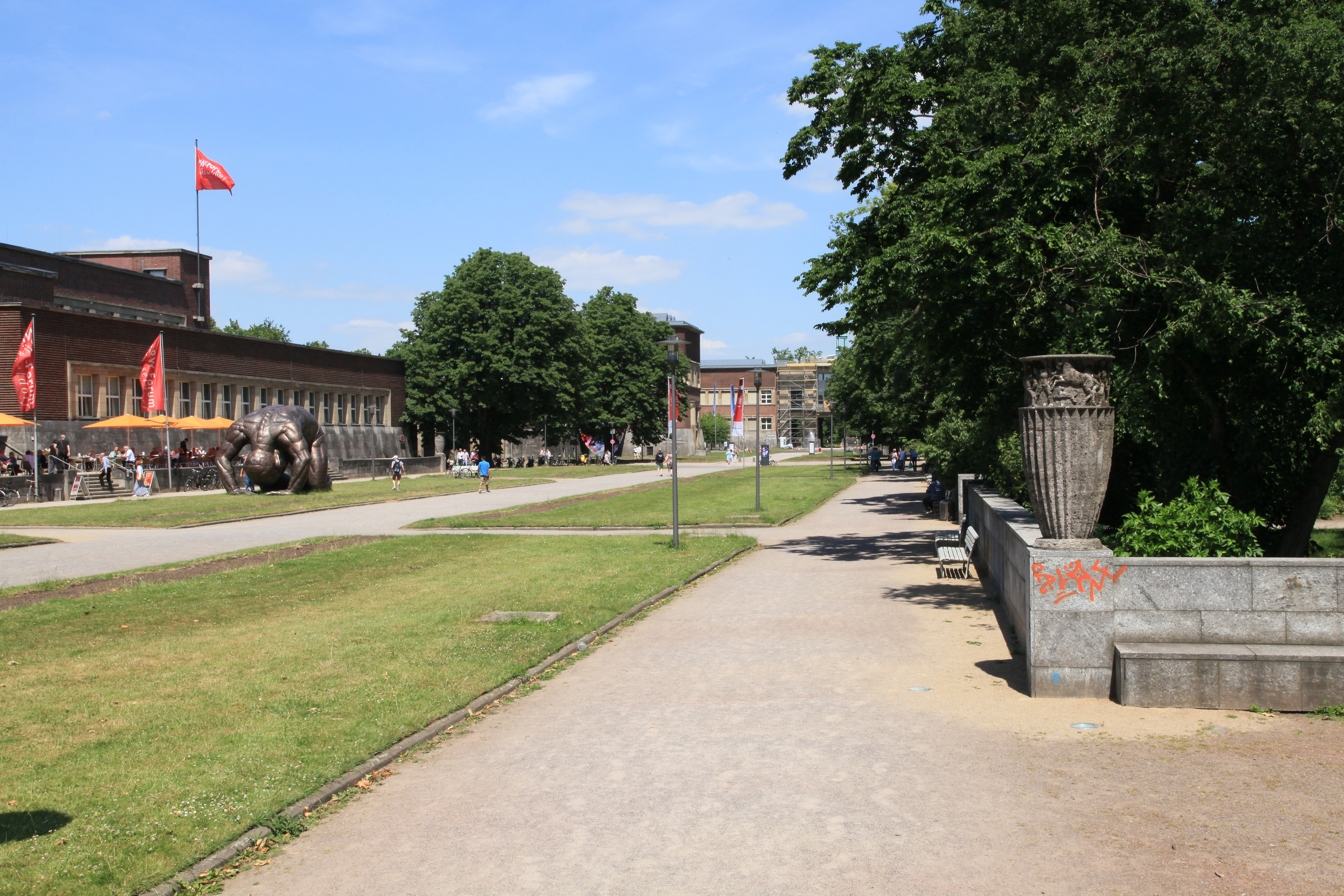
Ehrenhof complex in Düsseldorf, near the site approved for the Deutsches Fotoinstitut.

The Deutsches Fotoinstitut (DFI) is a national institution for photography currently being established in Düsseldorf, Germany. Its mission is to serve as a central platform for photographic culture by collaborating with archives, museums, and educational institutions in Germany and abroad. Its core mandate includes the preservation, research, and public engagement with photographic heritage.

The project is a joint initiative of the German federal government and the state of North Rhine-Westphalia, which together have allocated approximately €86 million in funding as of 2022. It has also received support from internationally renowned artists such as Cindy Sherman, Jeff Wall, Jan Dibbets, and Christopher Williams. The DFI is scheduled to begin operations in 2026, with its purpose-built facilities expected to be completed by 2031.

== Concept and mandate ==
According to the 2025 report of the founding commission, the Deutsches Fotoinstitut (DFI) is designed as a central hub and aggregator for a decentralized network of institutions, archives, and museums. The institute will provide a shared analog and digital infrastructure to support long-term strategies for conservation, digitization, and public access, with the goal of ensuring the longevity of photographic works and knowledge across Germany and internationally. A further focus is on the materiality of photographic objects, ensuring that both their physical and digital forms are preserved, researched, and understood within broader conservation and scholarship strategies.

The commission’s final recommendations outline five core areas of activity:

- Preservation and Conservation: Safeguard photographic heritage, culture, and knowledge; coordinate efforts; and set national standards.
- Research and Scholarship: Advance academic inquiry and interdisciplinary collaboration, including fellowships, joint projects, and research based on archival holdings.
- Digitization and Infrastructure: Build a shared digital platform to connect archives, create common interfaces, and improve accessibility.
- Exhibitions and Education: Develop collaborative programs with national and international partners.
- Advisory Services: Provide consulting and knowledge transfer through a nationwide network.

In a statement issued at the presentation of the report, Federal Government Commissioner for Culture and the Media, Wolfram Weimer, emphasized that the Deutsches Fotoinstitut should both safeguard Germany’s photographic heritage and serve as a “house of visual futures” addressing the challenges of artificial intelligence and digitization. He reaffirmed the Federal Government’s commitment to co-funding the Düsseldorf building in partnership with the State of North Rhine-Westphalia and the City of Düsseldorf.

The commission’s recommendations were based on two earlier proposals: one developed by the Verein zur Gründung und Förderung eines Deutschen Fotoinstituts e. V. (DFI e. V., Association for the Foundation and Development of a German Institute of Photography), a non-profit association in Düsseldorf, and another commissioned by then Federal Government Commissioner for Culture and the Media Monika Grütters. Both provided the essential political and conceptual groundwork for the institute.

== Founding commission and current development ==
In September 2023, the Federal Government, the State of North Rhine-Westphalia, and the City of Düsseldorf jointly appointed a seven-member advisory founding commission to develop recommendations for the Deutsches Fotoinstitut. The commission was chaired by Susanne Gaensheimer, Director of the Kunstsammlung Nordrhein-Westfalen. Its members comprised museum directors, curators, conservators, and an artist-photographer.

The commission’s final report, published in July 2025, outlines the transition to the institute’s implementation phase and identifies immediate priority measures. Key measures include:

- Establishing core infrastructure for conservation, digitization, research, and public engagement.
- Building a network linking archives, museums, collections, and educational institutions in Germany and abroad.
- Launching research, training, and education programs.
- Engaging with holders of photographic estates, studios, collections, and partner institutions to assess needs, develop solutions for preservation and accessibility, and identify initial projects for the planned National Photography Fund.

== Public funding and government support ==
The Deutsches Fotoinstitut is a cultural project jointly funded by the federal government and the state of North Rhine-Westphalia. This funding model reflects Germany’s decentralized cultural policy framework.

Following a joint application by the City of Düsseldorf and the artists' association DFI e. V. in 2019, the German Bundestag initially allocated €41.5 million in federal funding. The state of North Rhine-Westphalia committed an equal amount, bringing the initial budget to €83 million. In 2022, the Bundestag's Budget Committee approved additional federal funds and commitment authorizations of €42.9 million, raising the total available funding by approximately €1.5 million to €86 million.

According to Ina Brandes, Minister of Culture for North Rhine-Westphalia, operations are scheduled to begin in 2026.

The National Photography Fund is planned to complement the DFI’s infrastructure, providing project-based support to archives, collections, universities, and independent cultural practitioners across Germany.

== Location and infrastructure ==
As of July 2025, the Deutsches Fotoinstitut is planned to be established at two dedicated sites in Düsseldorf. The founding commission recommended that a centrally located building should house exhibitions, educational programs, and administrative offices to ensure public visibility, while a second, more technical facility would be used for digitization, conservation, and archival storage. Both buildings are scheduled for completion by 2031.

For the start-up phase, the commission recommended that existing, centrally located spaces be made available as soon as possible. These temporary premises should offer approximately 300–500 square meters of barrier-free working space with public visibility.

In June 2020, the Düsseldorf City Council approved a centrally located site near the Ehrenhof for the future main building. As of 2025, the final site has not yet been determined; according to Mayor Stephan Keller, the Ehrenhof site remains reserved for the project.

== Historical background ==
=== Earlier proposals and initiatives ===
The idea of a national photography institution in Germany dates back to the late 19th century. Early proposals for a national museum of photography appeared in the journal Photographie für Alle, first in 1897 by Franz Goerke, followed by Richard Neuhauss (1902), Karl Weiß (1906), and Fritz Matthies-Masuren (1909). In 1912, Adolf Miethe and Neuhauss advocated the creation of a national collection to preserve pioneering photographic works for posterity.

These early ideas were revived in the late 20th century. In the 1980s, art historian Bodo von Dewitz (Museum Ludwig, Cologne) called for a central institution to combine archiving, research, and exhibitions under one roof. In October 1999, a symposium organized by the Deutsche Gesellschaft für Photographie and the Neue Gesellschaft für Bildende Kunst discussed the creation of a "Centrum für Photographie" in Berlin, a plan that was ultimately not realized.

=== Origins of the current initiative ===
The current initiative began in 2019 with the founding of the non-profit association Verein zur Gründung und Förderung eines Deutschen Fotoinstituts e. V. (DFI e. V.) in Düsseldorf. The association's founding members and board included Andreas Gursky, Stefan Hostettler, and Moritz Wegwerth. Founded and steered by artists, the project received support from internationally renowned artists such as Jan Dibbets, Hans-Peter Feldmann, Cindy Sherman, Jeff Wall, and Christopher Williams. The association cooperates with the Kunstakademie Düsseldorf, the City of Düsseldorf, and the Photographische Sammlung/SK Stiftung Kultur in Cologne, which houses the August Sander Archive and the Bernd and Hilla Becher Archive. Since 2022, the DFI e. V. has organized a series of talks, exhibitions, and events within the discursive series Towards Photography, exploring contemporary debates in photography.

On 15 October 2019, the City of Düsseldorf and the DFI e. V. submitted a joint funding application to the Federal Government and the state of North Rhine-Westphalia. The application, based on a concept developed by the association, became the basis for the subsequent funding commitments.

== Debates and controversies ==
The planning and implementation of the Deutsches Fotoinstitut were accompanied by an extended cultural and political debate, unfolding over several years in national newspaper feuilletons and in political committees at both federal and state level. While the City of Düsseldorf and the artists’ association DFI e. V. were preparing their joint proposal in 2019, the Federal Government commissioned a separate concept for a “Federal Institute for Photography.“ Led by curator Thomas Weski, this alternative initiative proposed Essen as the location and presented a different institutional model. The competing concepts attracted significant media attention and provoked critical discussions among artists, curators, and cultural policymakers. This location dispute became a recurring theme in the public debate. In August 2021, Die Zeit described it as a "chronology of an escalation," citing internal documents about Düsseldorf’s lobbying for the location.

The debate also included statements from prominent artists. In early 2020, Der Spiegel published an interview with Andreas Gursky on the Düsseldorf initiative, titled “So wird die Fotografie unsterblich,” in which he explained his motivation for his engagement in the artist-led initiative and the necessity of establishing a national institute dedicated to the preservation and longevity of photographic works. In a 2021 interview with the Süddeutsche Zeitung, artists Annette Kelm, Thomas Demand, Thomas Struth, and Wolfgang Tillmans emphasized the necessity of a national photography institution to safeguard Germany’s photographic heritage, while also stressing the international importance of German photography and voicing concerns about the project's future. In 2021, when asked in an interview with Lighting the Archive about the conception of a national photography institute, Wolfgang Tillmans emphasized the importance of conservation practices grounded in artistic experience and called for a stronger integration of artists’ perspectives into restoration processes. In a Towards Photography interview, Jeff Wall discussed the impermanence of face-mounted C-prints and related issues of print longevity; he also spoke appreciatively of Andreas Gursky’s sustained commitment to the initiative on The Art Newspaper podcast A Brush With… (2024), highlighting its cultural and institutional significance for the future of photography.
