= Judith Joy Ross =

American portrait photographer (born 1946)

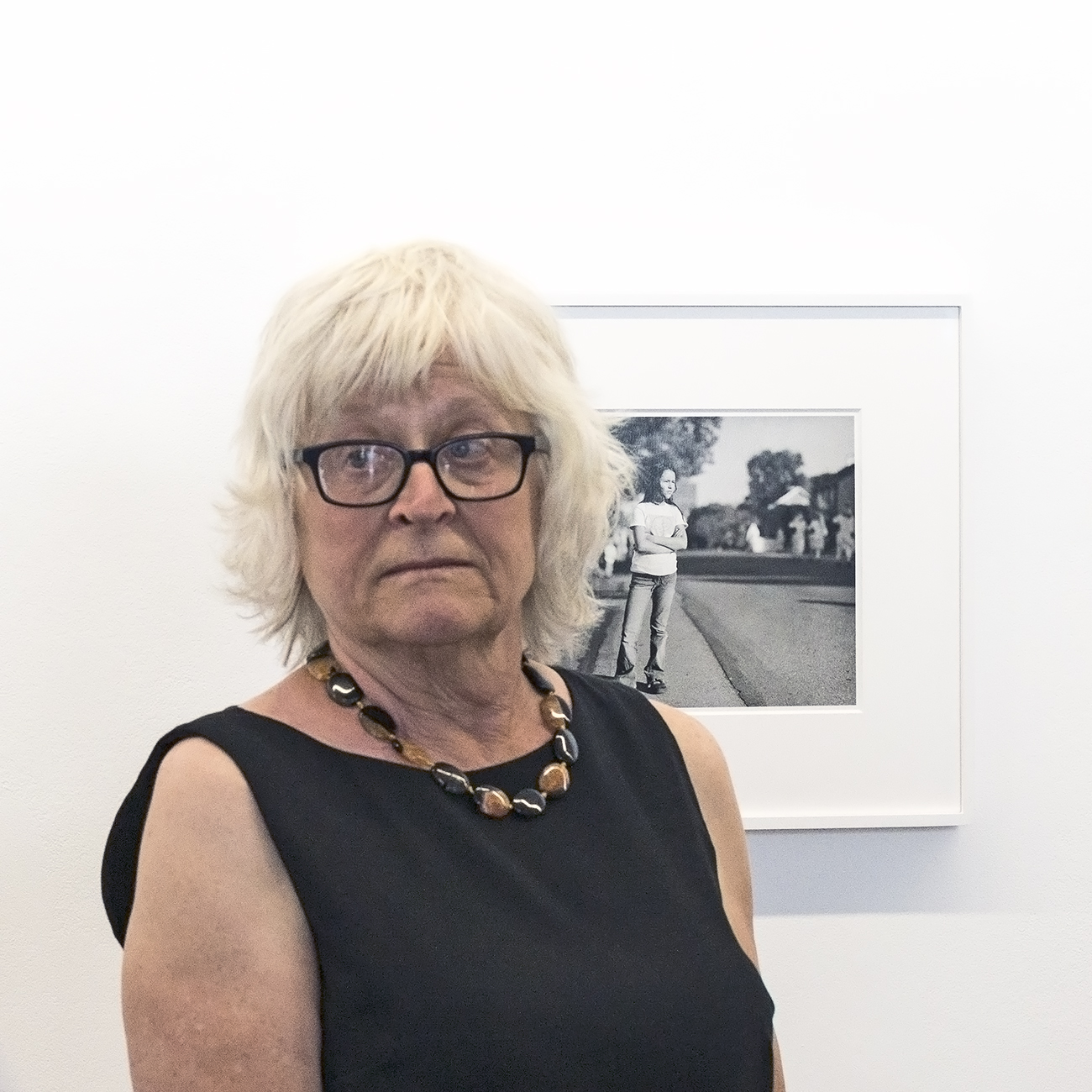
- Ross at Zander Gallery, Köln, 2017
- Born: 1946 (age 79–80)
- Awards: Guggenheim Fellowship; 1985 Photography

Judith Joy Ross (born 1946) is an American portrait photographer. Her books include Contemporaries (1995), Portraits (1996), Portraits of the Hazleton Public Schools (2006) and Protest the War (2007), "exploring such themes as the innocence of youth, the faces of political power, and the emotional toll of war".

== Personal life ==
Ross was born in Hazleton, Pennsylvania in 1946. She graduated from the Moore College of Art in 1968 and earned a master's degree in photography in 1970 from the Institute of Design at the Illinois Institute of Technology in Chicago, where she studied with Aaron Siskind.

== Works ==
Since the early 1980s, Ross has photographed a cross-section of the American population, especially people in eastern Pennsylvania where she was born and raised. Ross uses an 8×10 inch view camera mounted on a tripod and her portraits are made on printing out paper by contact, a process by which a print is made by placing a negative directly onto photographic paper, and then exposing it to sunlight for a few minutes to a few hours. Her photographic antecedents include the German August Sander and the American Diane Arbus.

Her series include pictures of children at Eurana Park in Weatherly, Pennsylvania (1982), visitors to the Vietnam Veterans Memorial in Washington D.C. (1983–1984), members of the United States Congress and their aides in their Washington offices (1986–1987), laborers, people at shopping malls, and children at play near her home in Bethlehem, Pennsylvania. She has also photographed immigrants in New York City and Paris, and was commissioned by the San Francisco Museum of Modern Art to photograph tech workers in Silicon Valley, California. One of her major projects, pictures made from 1992 to 1994 in Hazleton public schools she had attended in the 1950s and 1960s, was published by the Yale University Art Gallery in 2006 as Portraits of the Hazleton Public Schools.

Ross has been awarded a Guggenheim Fellowship from the John Simon Guggenheim Memorial Foundation (1985), a city of Easton, Pennsylvania Council on the Arts Grant (1988), the Charles Pratt Memorial Award of $25,000 (1992), and the Andrea Frank Foundation Award (1998).

Monographs and exhibition catalogs of her work have been published internationally.

John Szarkowski at the Museum of Modern Art in New York selected Ross' work for the first exhibition in the New Photography series. In 2011, Die Photographische Sammlung in Cologne organized a retrospective exhibition of Ross's work which traveled to the Kunstmuseum Kloster in Madeburg and the Foundation A Stichting, Brussels.

In 2023, the Philadelphia Museum of Art exhibited her work in Judith Joy Ross, which featured approximately 200 of her photographs.

== Publications ==
- Judith Joy Ross: Contemporaries: a Photographic Series. New York: Museum of Modern Art, 1995. ISBN 978-0870701467. With an essay by Susan Kismaric.
- Judith Joy Ross: Portraits. Hannover: Sprengel Museum, 1996. ISBN 9783891691014. With an essay by Thomas Weski. Exhibition Catalog.
- Portraits of the Hazleton Public Schools. New Haven: Yale University Art Gallery, 2006. ISBN 9780300115840. With an essay by Jock Reynolds.
- Protest the War. Göttingen: Steidl, 2007. ISBN 978-3865215291. With an essay by Andrew Szegedy-Maszak.
- Living with War – Portraits, Vietnam Veterans Memorial, Gulf War, Protest the War. Göttingen: Steidl, 2008. ISBN 978-3865217172. Edited and with an essay by Heinz Liesbrock. Exhibition catalogue.
- Judith Joy Ross. Photographs Since 1982. Cologne: Die Photographische Sammlung/SK Stiftung Kultur im Mediapark, 2011. ISBN 9783829605656. With essays by Gabriele Conrath-Scholl and Claudia Schubert.
- Judith Joy Ross: Photographs 1978–2015. New York: Aperture, 2022. ISBN 978-1597115223

== Collections ==
Ross' work is held in the following public collections:

- Metropolitan Museum of Art, New York: 5 prints (as of June 2018)
- Museum of Modern Art, New York: 55 prints (as of June 2018)
- San Francisco Museum of Modern Art
- Museum of Fine Arts, Houston
- National Gallery of Canada, Ottawa
- Die Photographische Sammlung, Cologne
- The Pilara Foundation Collection, Pier 24 Photography, San Francisco
- Victoria and Albert Museum, London: 4 prints (as of June 2018)
- Yale University Art Gallery, New Haven.
