= Bricklayer (photograph) =

Photograph by August Sander

Bricklayer (1928) by August Sander

Bricklayer, also known as the Hod Carrier, is a black and white photograph by August Sander from 1928. The photograph shows an unidentified bricklayer. Originally published in his work Face of Our Time (Antlitz der Zeit) and later in Sander's lifelong project People of the Twentieth Century, the series records the countless professions and people of German society during the Weimar Republic. The image is included in Time magazine's list of the 100 most influential photographs ever taken, and it has served as an inspiration to other photographers throughout the twentieth century.

== Description ==
The photograph depicts a bricklayer from Cologne, Germany, emerging from the darkness behind him. His strongly illuminated face has an expression of pride and determination. He is dressed in a typical bricklayer's uniform and cap. His left hand holds the platform where he carries on his shoulders a significant and seemingly heavy number of bricks, while the other hand rests on his hip. The unidentified man stands as an iconic representation of the working class. The photograph illustrates the strength and hard work of the profession of the bricklayer, while also demonstrating his dignity and pride.

== Context ==
Bricklayer was part of Sander's lifelong mission to create a physiognomic map of German people under the Weimar Republic. He adopted a documentary, objective style, conveying a sense of realism in depicting how Germans navigated life during an era of instability.

The Pastry Cook (1928) by August Sander

The photograph was one of sixty pictures in Face of Our Time (Antlitz der Zeit), in which Sander sought to capture the social life of a diverse group of citizens divided by social class and location. The captions describe the social type that each picture represents, for example: "young mother, middle class", "unemployed" and so on.

The Bricklayer follows the format of other photographs in the series, such as Pastry Cook. Despite the different professions represented, the two photographs similarly show their subjects in comparable poses, directly facing the viewer with stern expressions while engaging in their work. Both works have been seen by scholars as highlighting a tension between individual freedom and the constraints of labor and social class. Sander almost always had his subjects look straight at the camera, in poses that would present them in a seemingly candid way. Scholars additionally note that his working-class sitters are identified with the tools they grasp, unlike the businessmen in his photographs.

Bricklayer later became part of Sander's larger project entitled People of the Twentieth Century, which was meant to catalog people from every part of society. In the project, Sander grouped the photographs in portfolios that corresponded to different social classes. Bricklayer was included in the "proletariat" section along with images of other citizens involved in manual labor.

== Analysis ==
The photograph demonstrates several of Sander's distinctive artistic tendencies. Challenging photographic convention, Sander left his shadow visible in the image, allowing his silhouette to fall over the lower left half of the subject. Scholars have interpreted the shadow as Sander's acknowledgment of his role intervening in the subject's lived experience. Scholars also note that the light upon the bricks surrounding the subject's head suggest a halo, giving him a saintly aura.

== Legacy ==
The photograph influenced later photographers such as Bernd and Hilla Becher, who owned a copy of Antlitz der Zeit. The Bechers were inspired by the uniformity of Sander's style and his depiction of subjects within a shallow space. The Bechers similarly created images within categories, often focusing on single subjects such as water towers, which they presented in vertical compositions. Although different in subject, the consistent form of the photographs suggest the influence of Sander.

== Art market ==
A print of the photograph was sold for $749,000 at Sotheby's New York, on 11 December 2014.

== Public collections ==
There are prints of the photograph in several public collections, including the Museum of Modern Art, in New York, The Art Institute of Chicago, the Minneapolis Institute of Art, and the San Francisco Museum of Modern Art.
