= The Pastry Cook =

Photograph by August Sander

The Pastry Cook (1928) by August Sander

The Pastry Cook, also known as The Pastry Chef, is a black and white photograph taken by German photographer August Sander, in 1928. It was included in his photography book Face of Our Time, published in 1929, and was part of his People of the 20th Century project. The photograph became one of the most famous in his depictions of professions and characters of the Weimar Republic.

== History and description ==
Sander's photograph depicts Franz Bremer, who was the owner and pastry chef of the café Conditorei, located in the Dürener Straße, in Cologne, near the photographer's studio. Sander was a regular attendant of the café and as such was able to invite Bremer to pose for this picture. The cook is shown here in his working attire, apparently in his usual cuisine work, while mixing the content of a bowl. He is largely bald, wears a moustache and looks directly at the viewer, with an apparent sense of confidence and pride in his profession. The background of his kitchen is rather dark and somewhat uninviting.

== Reception ==
Charles Saatchi Gallery article on this picture states: "What makes the picture so splendid is Sander's use of light. The chef is well illuminated, with his face and body equally exposed. The background is dark and out of focus, emphasising the impact of his gaze."

Art historian H. W. Janson, in his History of Art: The Western Tradition, singles out this photograph and compares it with the work of his contemporary painter George Grosz: "Clearly proud of his position, the man in Pastry Cook, Cologne (...) is the very opposite of the timid figure in George Grosz's Germany, a Winter's Tale (...). Despite their curious resemblance, this "good citizen" seems oblivious to the evil that Grosz has depicted so vividly. While the photograph passes no individual judgement, in the context of the book [of Sander] the chef's lack of concern stands as a strong indictement of the era as a whole."

Joann Lacey stated that with photographs like The Pastry Cook, "Sander transforms the practice of portraiture with these arresting, sensational images."

== Public collections ==
There are prints of this photograph in public collections, including the August Sander Archive, in Cologne, the Walther Collection, the Museum of Modern Art, in New York, the Carnegie Museum of Art, in Pittsburgh, the Nelson-Atkins Museum of Art, in Kansas City, the Toledo Museum of Art, and the Worcester Art Museum.

== See also ==
- List of photographs considered the most important
