= Die Photographische Sammlung/SK Stiftung Kultur =

German photography museum

Coordinates: 50.9488°N 6.9432°E

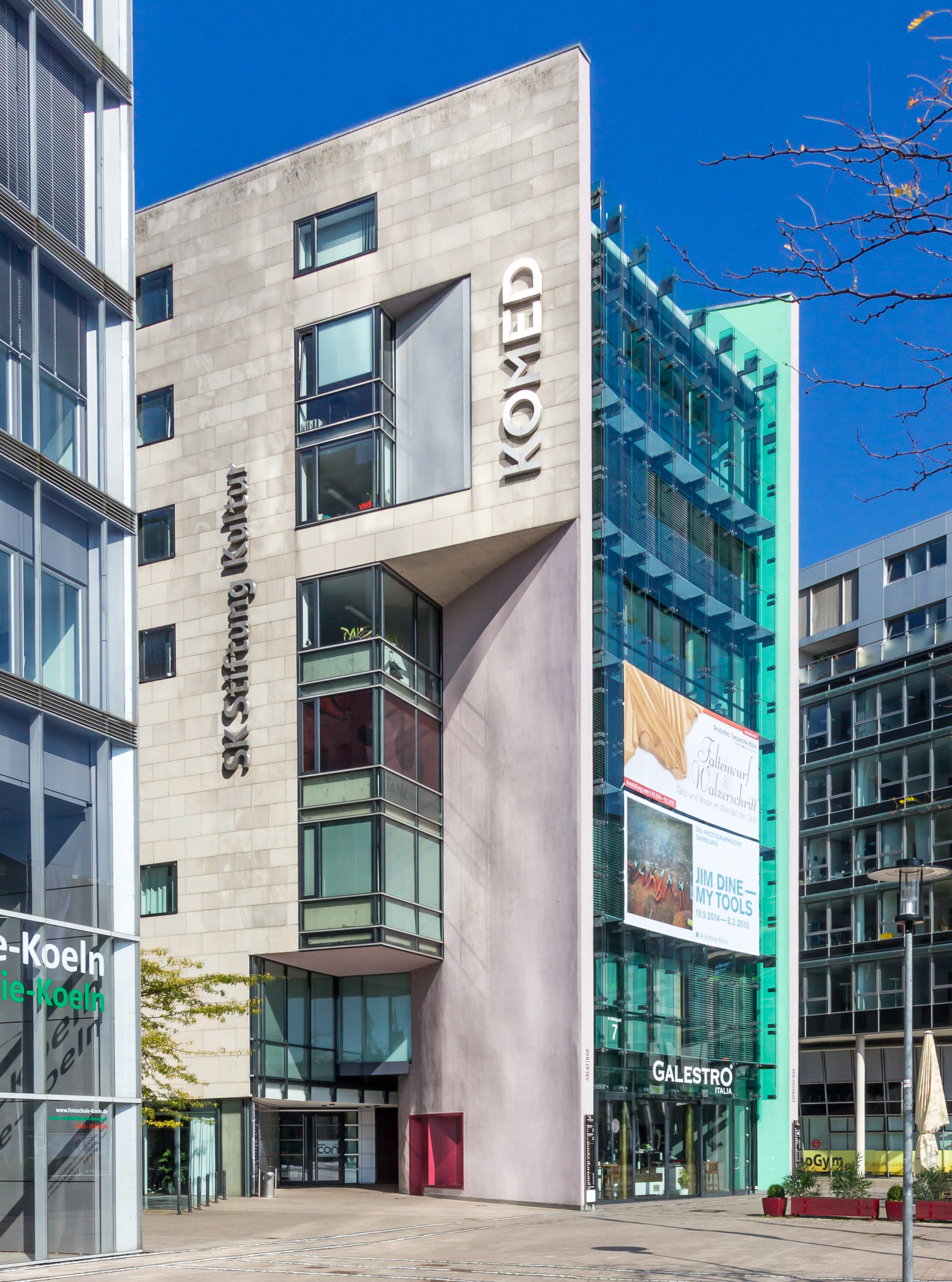
- Established: 1992
- Location: Cologne, Germany
- Collections: August Sander photo archive
- Owner: SK Stiftung Kultur
- Website: museenkoeln.de/portal/Die-Photographische-Sammlung

Die Photographische Sammlung is the photography museum of the SK Stiftung Kultur, the cultural foundation of the Sparkasse KölnBonn bank in Cologne, Germany. The full name is usually stylized Die Photographische Sammlung/SK Stiftung Kultur. The collection includes an archive of the photographs of August Sander.

== History ==
The museum was founded in 1992 after the SK Stiftung Kultur bought the archive of the photographs of August Sander. from Gerd Sander, August Sander's grandson.

On February 10, 2022, claiming fair use, August's great-grandson Julian Sander released the entire archive online as almost free (other than a small admin fee) non fungible tokens (NFT) made available via the OpenSea NFT marketplace. SK Stiftung Kultur issued a copyright infringement notice to OpenSea, stating that it held the copyright of the archive until 2032.

== Activities ==
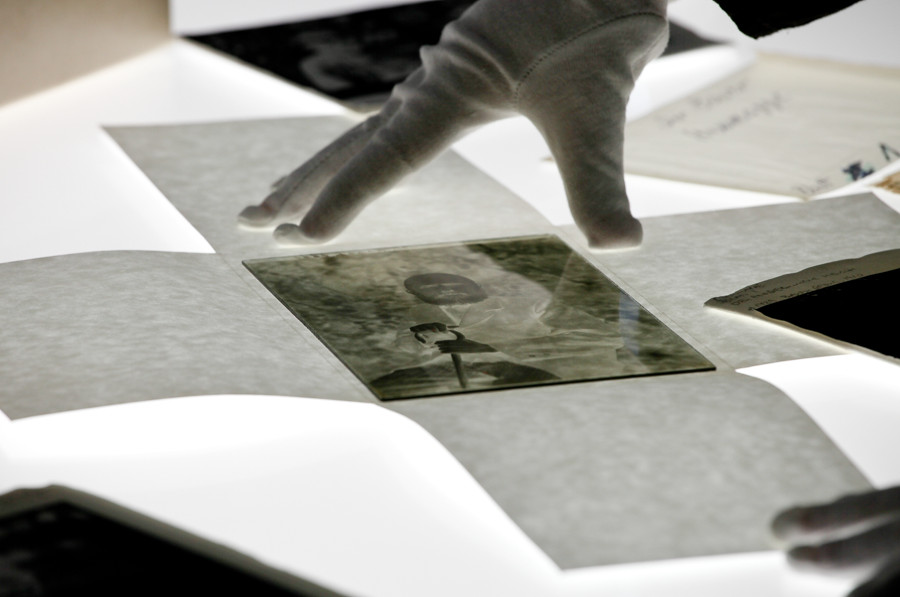
An archivist viewing one of the archive's glass negatives on a light table

The museum sometimes lends the photographs from the original archive for exhibits about Sander, his work and that of his contemporaries. The museum was one of the organizers of the Bernd & Hila Becher show at the Met Museum in 2022.

The collection includes over 30,000 photographs from around the world. In 2021, the museum published From Becher to Blume:Photographs from the Garnatz Collection and Die Photographische Sammlung-SK Stiftung Kultur, in Dialogue.

In July 2021, Die Photographische Sammlung/SK Stiftung Kultur entered into a cooperation with the City of Düsseldorf and the non-profit DFI e. V. (Verein zur Gründung und Förderung eines Deutschen Fotoinstituts e. V.) to advance the establishment of the Deutsches Fotoinstitut in Düsseldorf; in November 2021, the Kunstakademie Düsseldorf joined the partnership as a supporting institution.

== See also ==
- Judith Joy Ross
- Tata Ronkholz
- Rosalind Fox Solomon
- Henry Wessel Jr.
- August Sander
- Bernd and Hilla Becher
