= Ismo Hölttö =

Finnish photographer (born 1940)

The cover of Hölttö's book People in the Lead Role.

Ismo Olavi Hölttö (born 12 February 1940 in Espoo) is a Finnish documentary photographer known for his monochrome portraits of Romani people and others living in the cities and countryside of Finland in the 1960s, a time of rapid societal change.

== Life and career ==
Hölttö was born in 1940. In 1955, he started as an apprentice goldsmith with the Helsinki firm of G. Buchert. He studied at the School of Applied Arts, whose vocational evening courses were held in the Ateneum museum building. From then until 1970 he worked at the firm of Westerback; he left after winning the State Photography Prize and set up an advertising company, Rykämä. The photography for which he is known was almost complete by this point: thereafter, his professional photography left little time for him to pursue his own photographic interests.

Hölttö became interested in photography via two colleagues in the jewelry shop where he worked. He joined the Helsinki Camera Club and became friends with Mikko Savolainen, who had joined at about the same time and was able to give him technical advice. After initial attempts at landscape, Hölttö found his métier: portraiture. He pursued this vigorously, seldom photographing anything else.

In summer 1966 Hölttö and Savolainen visited Northern Karelia. They had had light-hearted intentions but found the trip unexpectedly worthwhile, and pursued the work during the coming years. In 1970, Savolainen arranged their work into the photobook Suomea tämäkin, published in time for Christmas. The two continued their partnership, bringing out the books Raportti Suomen mustalaisista (1972) and Vanhuksia (1981), on the Romani people and the elderly respectively. Hölttö's portraiture was complemented by Savolainen's concentration on communities.

Soon after becoming seriously interested in photography, Hölttö bought a Rolleiflex medium format twin lens reflex camera, whose design encouraged or even enforced a certain deliberation. From 1968, he added a 35 mm camera; but for the majority of his better-known portraits, his technique was somewhat similar to that of a studio photographer.

Such an extensive series of portraits was unprecedented for Finland, and Hölttö's work has sometimes been compared with August Sander's Menschen des 20. Jahrhunderts (English as People of the 20th Century). But whereas Sander had followed a self-imposed assignment of photographing people having a list of occupations, Hölttö photographed as he wished.

Hölttö's photography in Northern Karelia concentrated on smallholders and others on the lower rungs of society, but his coverage in Helsinki was broader, showing middle-class people and even hippies.

Together with Savolainen and Matti Saanio, Hölttö led social documentary, then the dominant trend of Finnish photography, in the 1970s. Using a Rolleiflex, he photographed both Helsinki and the Finnish countryside: North Karelia, Savonia (Note: Savonia: Northern Savonia and Southern Savonia.) and Oulu. He shot the main body of his work during the ten years between 1962 and 1971 while working as a goldsmith. When he started documenting the Finnish people, he was only 22; when he ended this series he had turned 31.

The reproductions of Hölttö's negatives have changed considerably over time. In the 1960s he favoured high contrast, close cropping, and glossy paper. The early books used duotone offset printing, with little or no space separating the images. His large 1989 book Ihminen pääosassa (English edition in 1991 as People in the Lead Role) used tritone printing for reduced and subtler contrast, with more relaxed cropping.

His works have been exhibited in Finland, Russia, Denmark, France and Lithuania.

== Books of Hölttö's works ==
- Mikko Savolainen and Ismo Hölttö (photographs), Aku-Kimmo Ripatti (text). Suomea tämäkin. (This too is Finland.) Jyväskylä: Gummerus, 1970. In Finnish.
- Kari Huttunen (text), Ismo Hölttö and Mikko Savolainen (photographs). Raportti suomen mustalaisista. (A report on the Roma of Finland.) Jyvaskylassa: K. J. Gummerus Osakeyhtion, 1972. ISBN 951-20-0089-X. In Finnish.
- Mikko Savolainen (text and photographs) and Ismo Hölttö (photographs). Vanhuksia. (The Elderly.) [Ilomantsi: M. Savolainen], 1982. ISBN 951-99418-6-X. In Finnish.
- Ismo Hölttö. Ihminen pääosassa. Kuvia suomalaisista. Helsinki: Ismo Hölttö, 1989. ISBN 951-99835-5-4. In Finnish.
- Ismo Hölttö. People in the Lead Role: Photographs of Finns. Helsinki: Ismo Hölttö, 1991. ISBN 952-90-2015-5. In English.
- Ismo Hölttö. Pieniä Ihmisiä. Helsinki: Erweko Painotuote, 2002. ISBN 952-91-4820-8. In Finnish.
- Ismo Hölttö. Valokuvia = Photographs. Helsinki: Finnish Museum of Photography, 2008. With an essay by Elina Heikka in Finnish and English. (Note: Both this book and another, quite distinct book share ISBN 978-951-9086-74-3. This number appears both within the copyright page and on the back cover of Valokuvia = Photographs, which is no. 25 in the series Suomen Valokuvataiteen Museon Julkaisusarja (ISSN 1239-6141), published by the Finnish Museum of Photography. No. 24 in the same series is Jukka Kukkonen and Elina Heikka, Punamustavalkea: 1918 Kuvat (2008). Both this 2012 page about publications available from the museum's shop and this 2010 description of the publisher's productions list both books with this single ISBN. Searches in OPACs for the ISBN usually bring no. 24; a search of WorldCat in February 2018 showed no record of no. 25. The page "Ismo Höltön kirjaharvinaisuus", announcing publication of Valokuvia = Photographs and incidentally describing its rather odd production process, shows a photograph of it.) The book uses plates made for Ihminen pääosassa (1989).
- Liisa Lindgren (text) and Ismo Hölttö (photographs). Taidetta Pikkuparlamentissa: Puun kansasta Menneisiin ritareihin. [Helsinki]: [Eduskunta], 2008. ISBN 978-951-53-3128-1. In Finnish. About works of art in the Finnish Parliament Annex.
  - Konst i Lilla Parlamentet: från Xylotek till Smultronstället. [Helsinki]: [Riksdagen], 2008. ISBN 978-951-53-3129-8. Swedish translation.
  - Art in the Little Parliament: From Wood People to Past Knights. [Helsinki]: [Eduskunta], 2008. ISBN 978-951-53-3130-4. English translation.
