= Sander (crater) =

Crater on Mercury

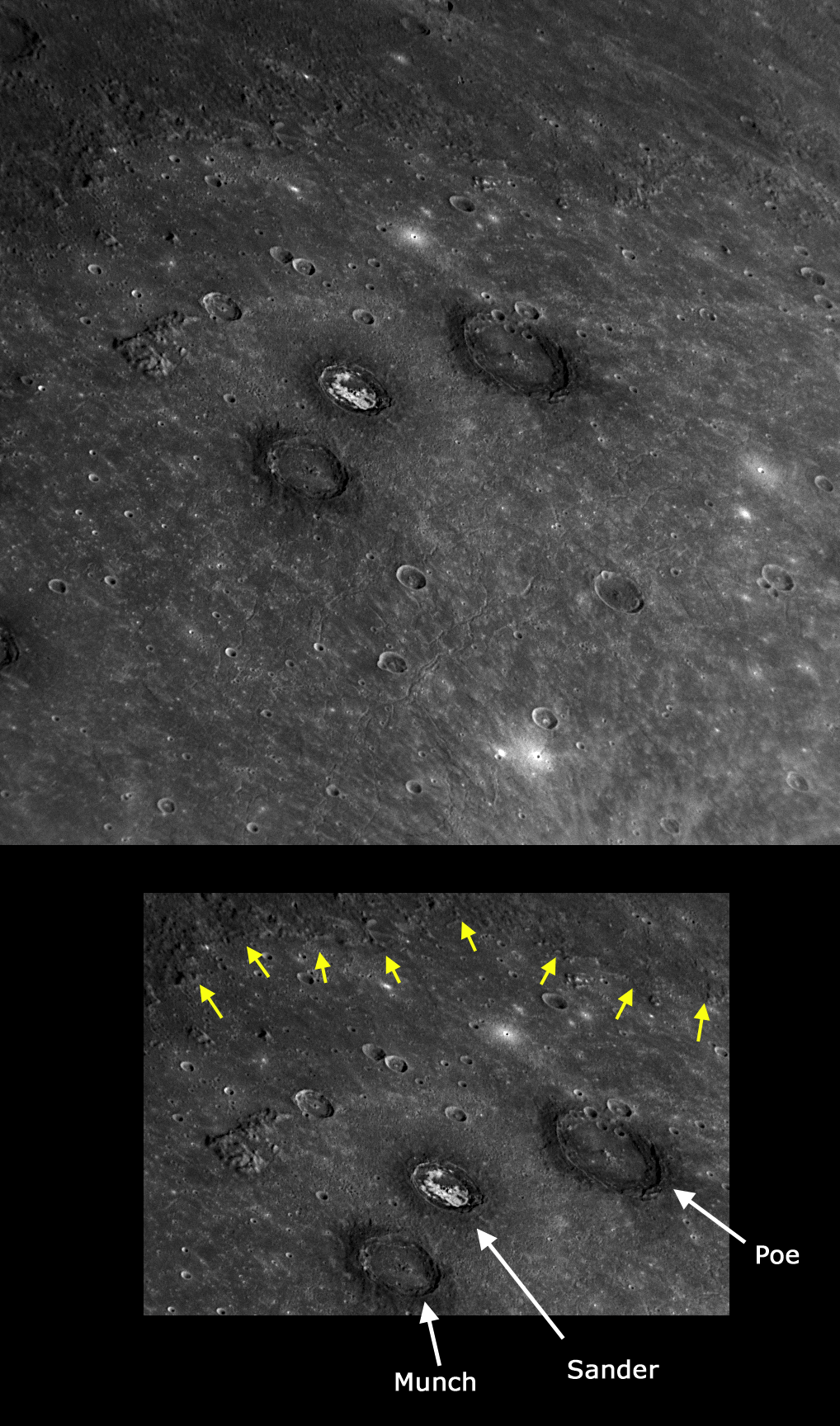
- The yellow arrows indicate the rim of Caloris basin
- Feature type: Impact crater
- Location: Raditladi quadrangle, Mercury
- Coordinates: 42.59°N 205.6°W
- Diameter: 50 km (31 mi)
- Eponym: August Sander

Sander is a crater on Mercury within Caloris Basin. It has dark walls and bright patches on its floor. Unlike the rays of Bashō crater, the bright areas are not believed to be immature, but they are inherently bright. It is named after the German photographer August Sander (1876–1964).

Hollows are present within Sander. A confirmed dark spot is present in Sander. This dark spot is associated with the hollows.

== Views ==
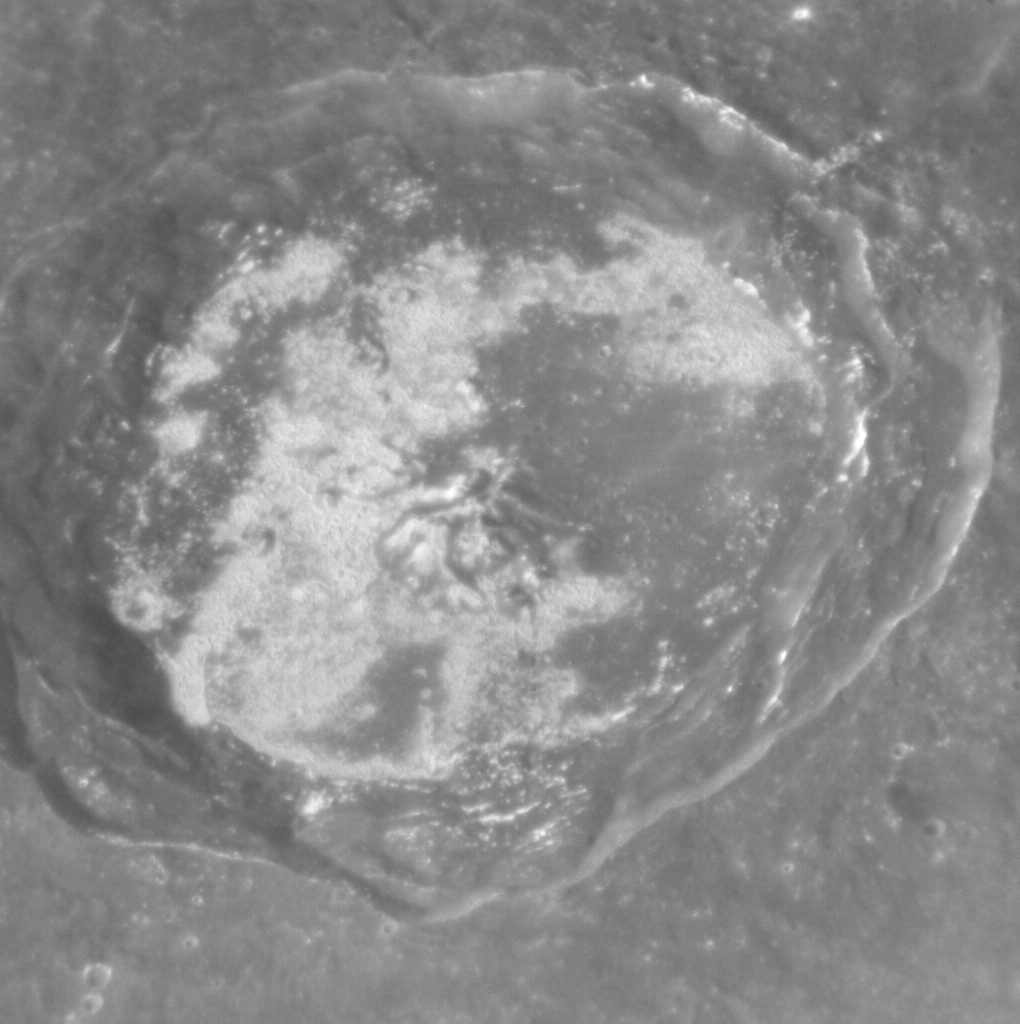
Sander crater, showing the hollows

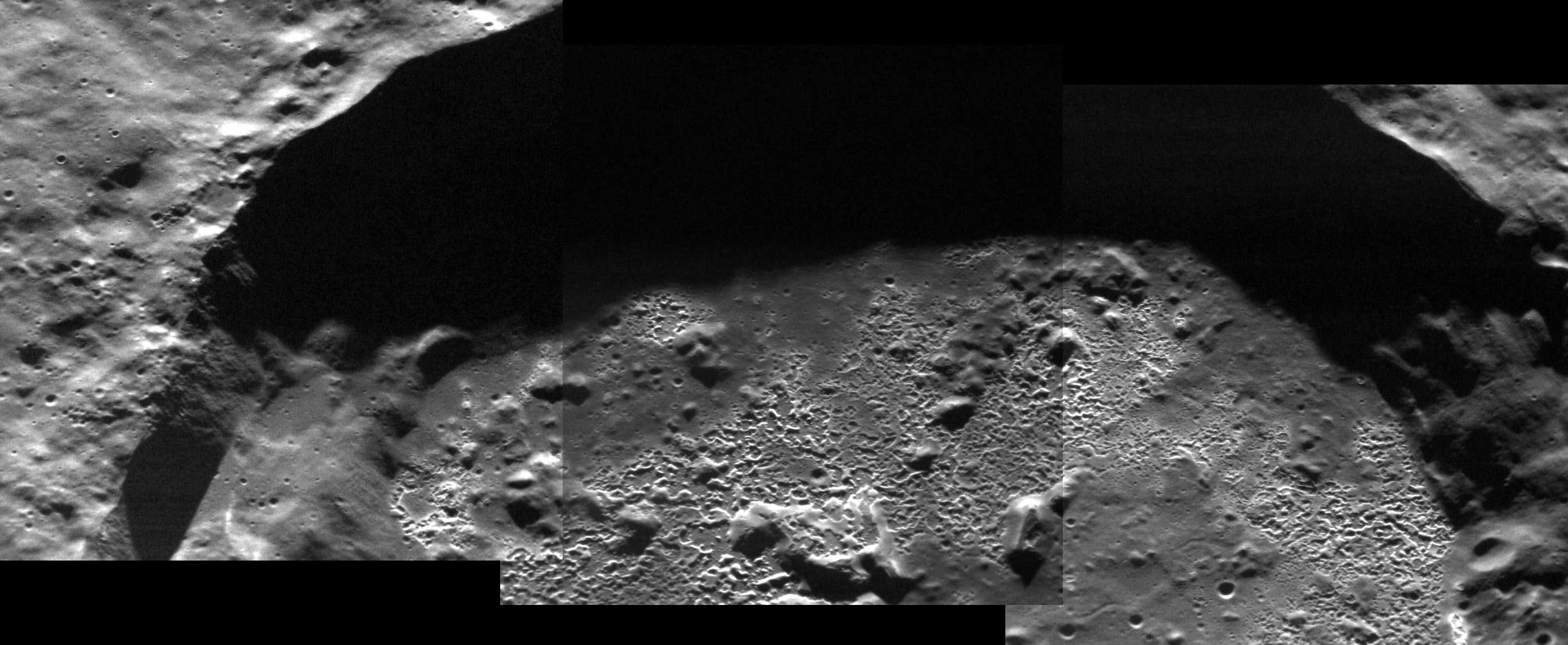
Western Sander crater, with detail of the hollows on the crater floor

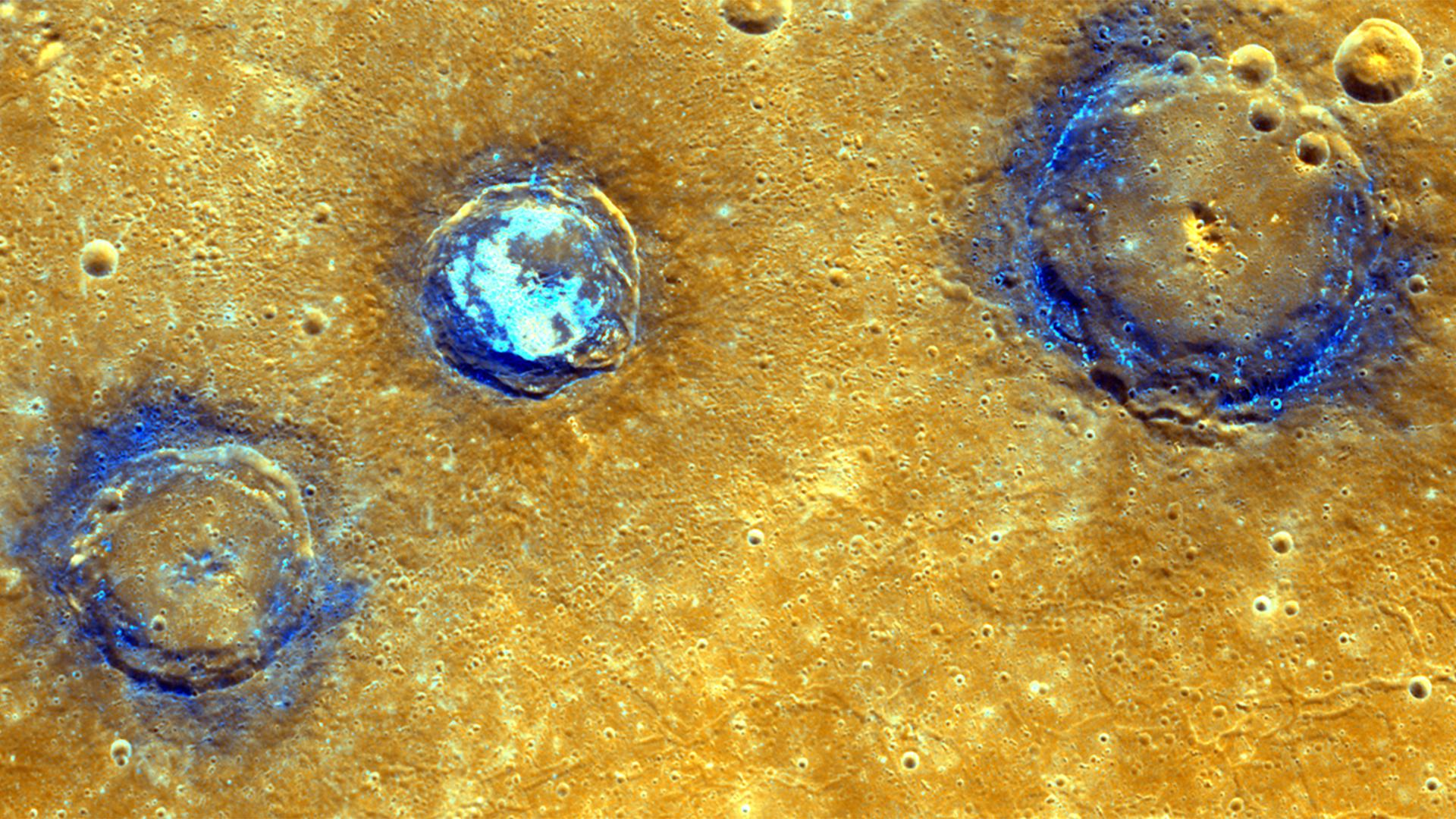
Enhanced-color mosaic showing the craters Munch (left), Sander (center), and Poe (right)
