= Poe (crater) =

Crater on Mercury

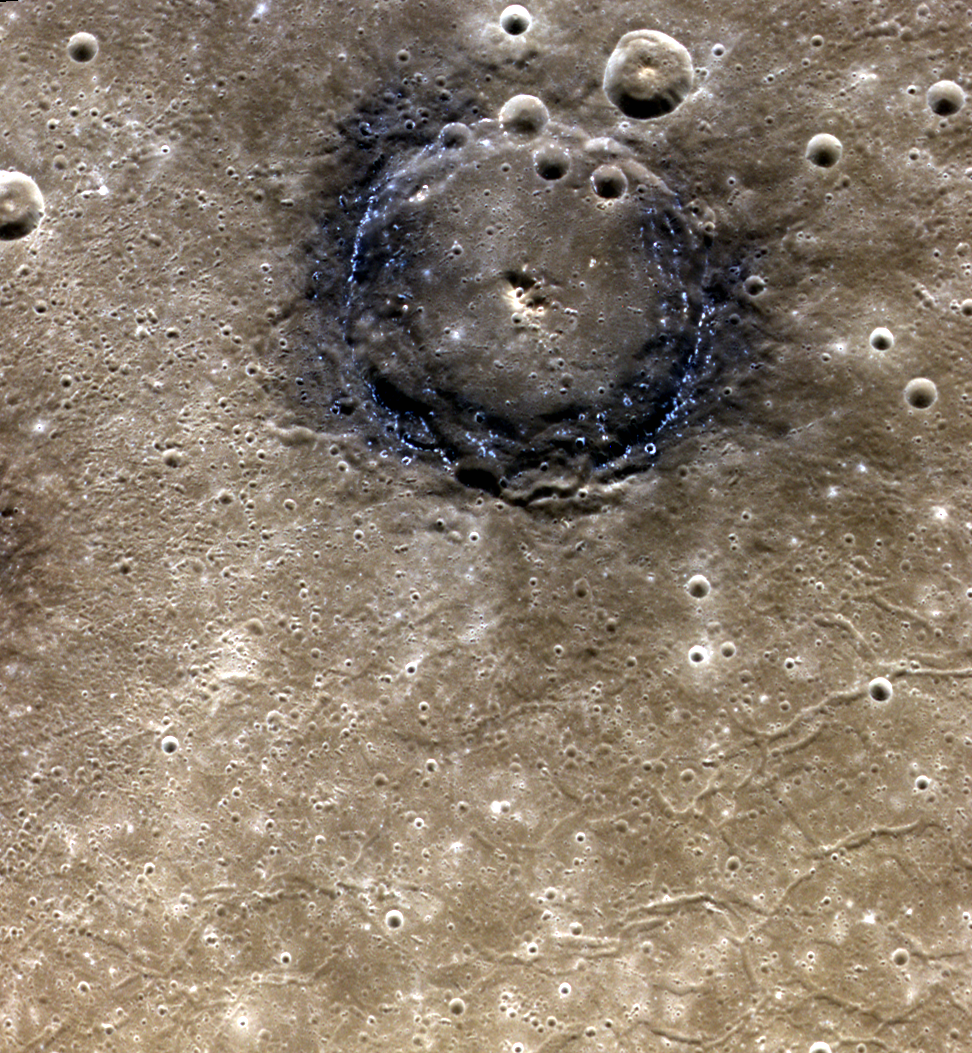
- Photo by MESSENGER
- Feature type: Impact crater
- Location: Raditladi quadrangle, Mercury
- Coordinates: 43.76°N 200.90°W
- Diameter: 77 km (48 mi)
- Eponym: Edgar Allan Poe

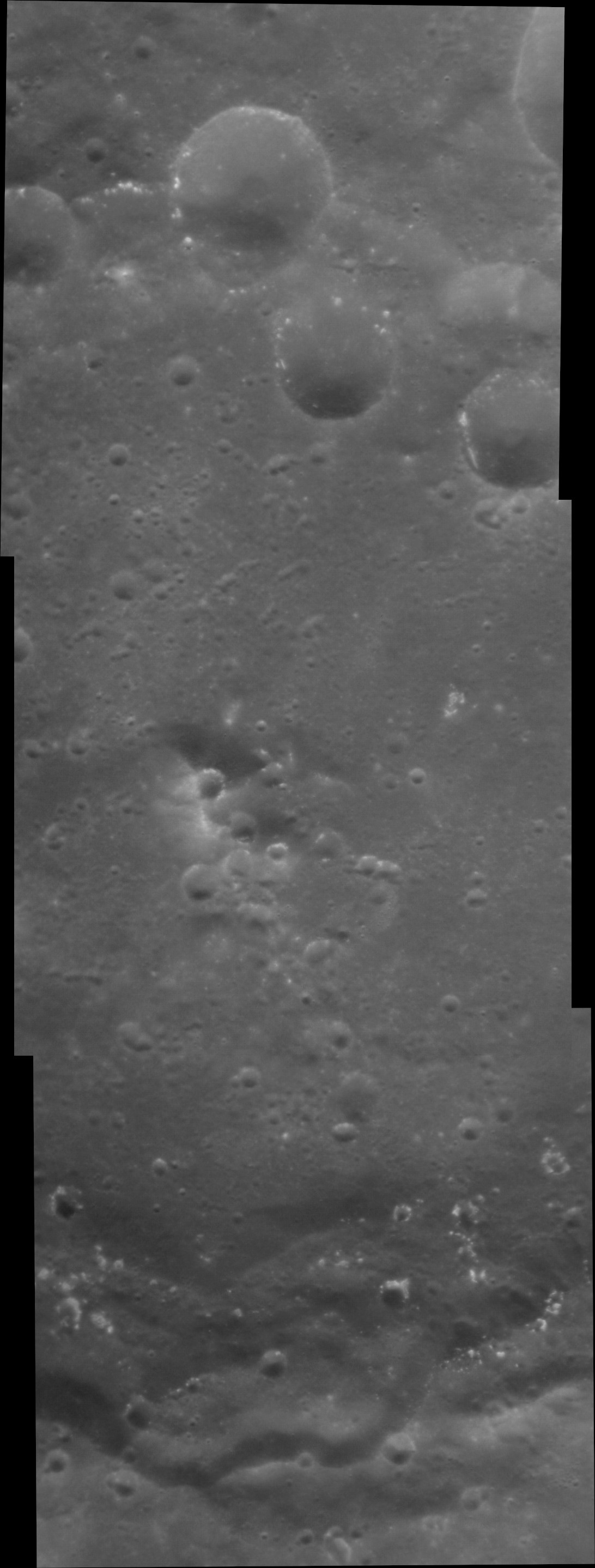
MESSENGER NAC mosaic showing the central region of Poe

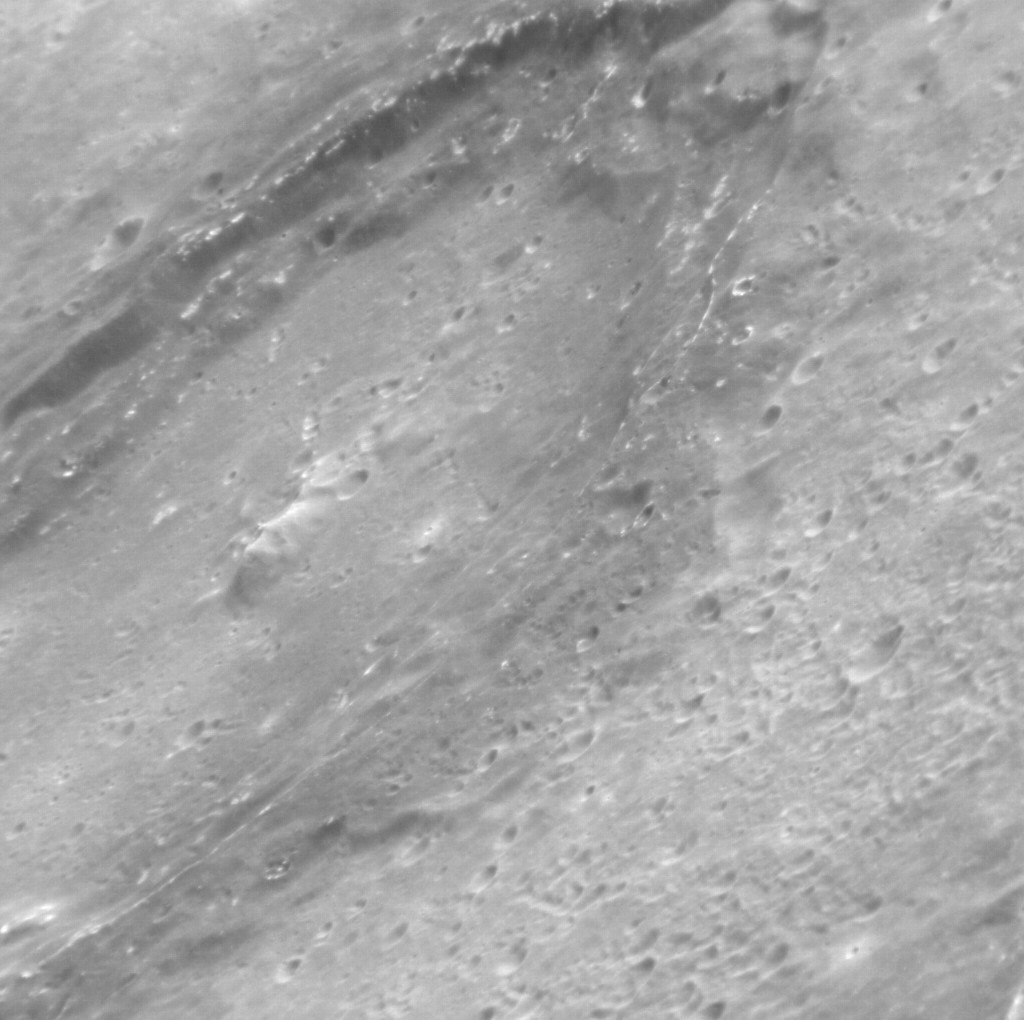
Oblique view

Poe is a crater on Mercury. It has diameter about 77 km (48 mi) and is situated in northern part of Caloris Planitia.

Hollows are scattered across Poe crater, and are abundant on the southern rim.

To the west of Poe are Sander and Munch craters.

== History ==
Poe is named after the famous author Edgar Allan Poe. The IAU named this crater in 2011 in honor of the Poe Toaster who put a bottle of cognac and roses at the grave of Poe.
