= Munch (crater) =

Crater on Mercury

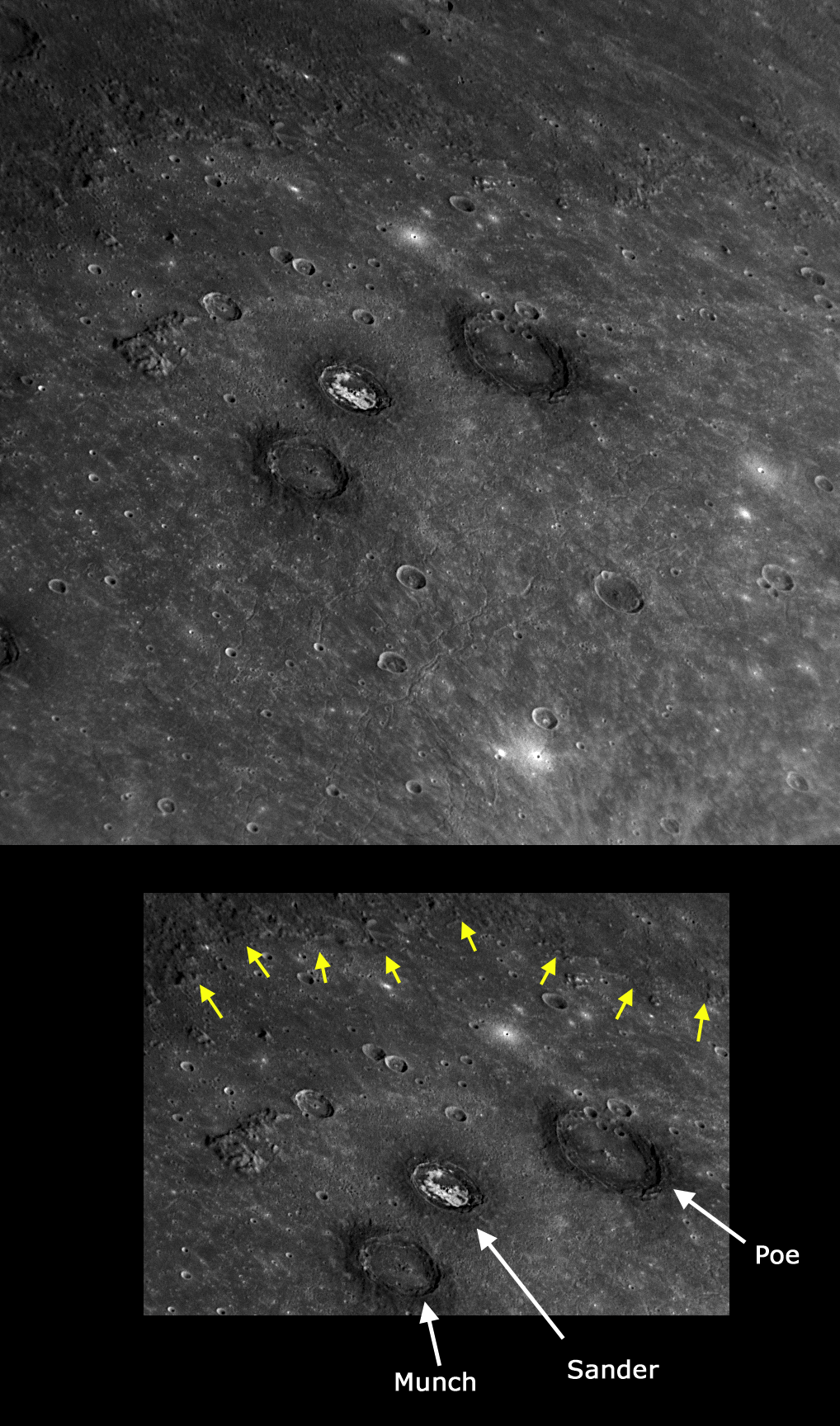
- Image of Munch and surrounding regions. The yellow arrows in the bottom inset indicate the rim of Caloris basin
- Feature type: Impact crater
- Location: Raditladi quadrangle, Mercury
- Coordinates: 40.48°N 207.18°W
- Diameter: 58 km (36 mi)
- Eponym: Edvard Munch

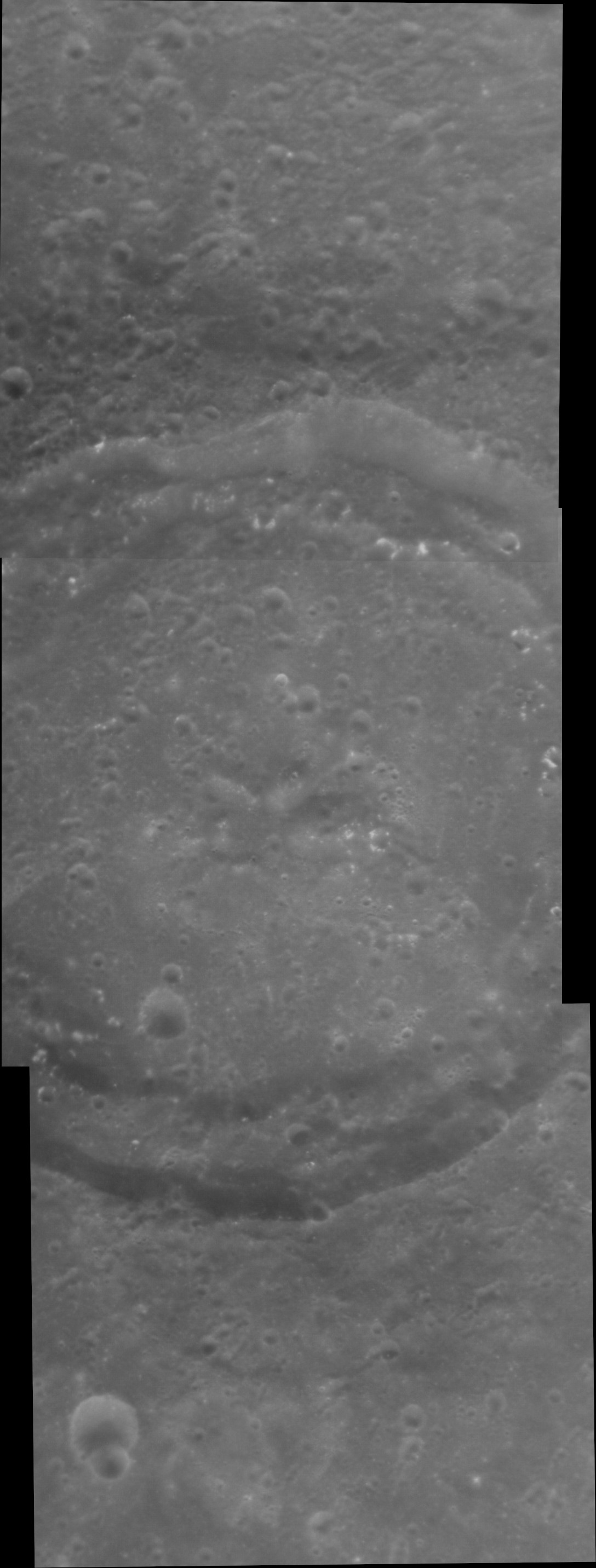
MESSENGER NAC mosaic

Munch is a crater on Mercury. It was discovered on the first flyby of Mercury by the MESSENGER spacecraft on 14 January 2008, and was named after Edvard Munch a Norwegian painter, printmaker, and draftsman (1863-1944) by the IAU in November of the same year.

Munch is west of Sander and Poe craters, within the Caloris basin.
