= August Sander Archive =

Art gallery in Cologne

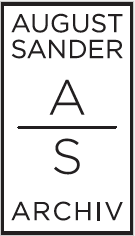
- Established: 1992
- Type: Art museum
- Website: www.photographie-sk-kultur.de/en/home/

The August Sander Archive (German: August Sander Archiv) comprises the estate of the German photographer August Sander and is part of the collection of Die Photographische Sammlung/SK Stiftung Kultur, in Cologne. The photographic work has been kept there since 1993 with a large number of original photographs, negatives and documents.

== History ==
When August Sander died in 1964, his son, Gunther Sander, took control of the estate. After his death in 1987, his son Gerd Sander managed the artistic legacy before he sold it to the Kulturstiftung der Stadtsparkasse Köln (now SK Stiftung Kultur der Sparkasse Köln Bonn) in December 1992, equating it with the name August Sander Archive. Since then, the estate, and thus the August Sander Archive, has been looked after by the Photographische Sammlung / SK Stiftung Kultur in Cologne and processed from an academic museum perspective.

All rights of use existing on August Sander's work have been transferred to Die Photographische Sammlung/SK Stiftung Kultur. These are held exclusively by the Photographic Collection / SK Foundation for Culture, without restriction in terms of location, content and time. The rights are administered in cooperation with VG Bild-Kunst, Bonn.

When the estate was purchased, it included around 10,700 original negatives, around 3,500 original prints, the original correspondence and the private library of the artist, as well as furniture and parts of the photographic equipment. Through targeted purchases, more than 6,000 original prints by August Sander are now part of the archive of the Photographische Sammlung / SK Stiftung Kultur. It is the world's largest collection of August Sander's work. Other important collections of original prints of the photographer exist in the J. Paul Getty Museum, in Los Angeles, in the Museum of Modern Art, in New York, in the Pinakothek der Moderne, in Munich, in the Museum Ludwig, in Cologne, Collection of Photography, and in Museum für Kunst und Gewerbe Hamburg in Hamburg.

From 1992 to 1996 the August Sander Archive was located at St.-Apern-Straße 17-21, in Cologne, after which it moved to the premises at Im Mediapark 7, also in Cologne.

With the establishment and sale of the August Sander Archive to the Kulturstiftung der Stadtsparkasse Köln in the 1990s, Gerd Sander laid the foundation for an institution from which the Photographische Sammlung / SK Stiftung Kultur could develop; an institution that is primarily dedicated to factual, conceptual photography in the artistic field. Gerd Sander was chairman of the advisory board of the Photographische Sammlung / SK Stiftung Kultur until 2008. Other important German estates were specifically attached to the institution, such as the Bernd and Hilla Becher Archive, legacies of Albert Renger-Patzsch, Karl Blossfeldt (in collaboration with the University of the Arts, Berlin) and the former collection of the German Society for Photography. International photography was also added, with a large collection of photographs by Jim Dine.

== Mission ==
One of the main goals of the Photographische Sammlung / SK Stiftung Kultur is to provide scientific support and processing for the August Sander Archive. August Sander's estate is being preserved from a museum conservation perspective, supplemented if possible by new acquisitions, researched and presented to the public in the form of publications and changing exhibitions. Mention should be of Sander's central project People of the 20th Century, which is available in book form and has been presented several times in exhibitions. No permanent exhibition on the work of August Sander is shown in the institution's exhibition rooms, but works from the August Sander Archive are regularly included in the changing exhibition program.

== August Sander Prize ==
The August Sander Prize was first announced in December 2017. It is linked to the promotion of the work of young contemporary artists in the field of factual and conceptual photography. Against the background of the important portrait photographs by August Sander, the photographic works of the applicants should primarily relate to the subject of the human portrait. Eligible are artists up to 40 years of age, of international origin, with a focus on photography. The prize is endowed with 5,000 euros and linked to a possible exhibition in the Photographische Sammlung / SK Stiftung Kultur in Cologne. The award is now presented every two years; the first winner was Francesco Neri from Faenza, Italy.

== Exhibitions ==
From the collection of the August Sander Archive, exhibitions are regularly held, dedicated to individual aspects of August Sander's oeuvre. The exchange with regional and international institutions is very important for this purpose. This is supported by many exhibition projects carried out in cooperation as well as an extensive loan system. Since 1992, over 100 exhibitions have taken place this way.

== See also ==
- List of museums devoted to one photographer
