= August Sander =

German portrait and documentary photographer (1876–1964)

- Self-portrait, 1925
- Born: 17 November 1876; Herdorf, Kingdom of Prussia, German Empire
- Died: 20 April 1964 (aged 87); Cologne, West Germany
- Occupation: Photographer
- Spouse: Anna Seitenmacher (m. 1902)

August Sander (17 November 1876 – 20 April 1964) was a German portrait and documentary photographer. His first book Face of our Time (German: Antlitz der Zeit) was published in 1929. Sander has been described as "the most important German portrait photographer of the early twentieth century". Sander's work includes landscape, nature, architecture, and street photography, but he is best known for his portraits, as exemplified by his series People of the 20th Century, where he aimed to show a cross-section of society during the Weimar Republic.

== Early life ==
Sander was born on 17 November 1876, in Herdorf, the son of a carpenter working in the mining industry. He had six siblings.

== Career ==
While working at the local Herdorf iron-ore mine, Sander first learned about photography by assisting a photographer from Siegen who was also working for the mining company. With financial support from his uncle, he bought photographic equipment and set up his own darkroom.

Sander spent his military service (1897–1899) as an assistant to Georg Jung of Trier; they worked throughout Germany including in Berlin, Magdeburg, Halle, Leipzig and Dresden. In 1901, he started working for Photographische Kunstanstalt Greif photo studio in Linz, Austria-Hungary, becoming a partner in 1902, and then sole-owner. In the late 1940s he joined the Upper Austrian Art Society. Sander left Linz at the end of 1909 or 1910 and set up a new studio at Dürener Strasse 201 in the Lindenthal district of Cologne.

In 1911, Sander began with the first series of portraits for his work People of the 20th Century. In this series, he aims to show a cross-section of society during the Weimar Republic. The series is divided into seven sections: The Farmer, The Skilled Tradesman, Woman, Classes and Professions, The Artists, The City, and The Last People (homeless persons, veterans, etc.).

German Deciduous Forest, Krefeld (1939), The Phillips Collection

In the early 1920s, he came in contact with the Cologne Progressives, a radical group of artists linked to the workers' movement, which, as Wieland Schmied put it,

"sought to combine constructivism and objectivity, geometry and object, the general and the particular, avant-garde conviction and political engagement, and which perhaps approximated most to the forward looking of New Objectivity [...] ".

In 1927, Sander and writer Ludwig Mathar travelled through Sardinia for three months, where he took around 500 photographs. However, a planned book detailing his travels was not completed.

Sander's Face of our Time was published in 1929. It contains a selection of 60 portraits from his series People of the 20th Century, and is introduced by an essay by Alfred Döblin titled "On Faces, Pictures, and their Truth". Under the Nazi regime, his work and personal life were greatly constrained. Sander's 1929 book Face of our Time was seized in 1936 and the photographic plates destroyed.

Around 1942, during World War II, he left Cologne and moved to the small village of Kuchhausen, in the Westerwald region; this allowed him to save the most important part of his body of work. His Cologne studio was destroyed in a 1944 bombing raid, but tens of thousands of negatives, which he had left behind in a basement near his former apartment in the city, survived the war. 25000 to 30000 negatives in this basement were then destroyed in a 1946 fire. That same year, Sander began his postwar photographic documentation of the city. He also tried to record the mass rape of German women by Red Army soldiers in the Soviet occupation zone.

In 1953, Sander sold a portfolio of 408 photographs of Cologne, taken between 1920 and 1939, to the Kölnisches Stadtmuseum. These would be posthumously published in book format in 1988, under the title Köln wie es war (Cologne as it was).

In 1962, 80 photographs from the People of the 20th Century project were published in book format, under the name Deutschenspiegel. Menschen des 20. Jahrhunderts (German Mirror. People of the 20th Century).

== Personal life and death ==
Sander married Anna Seitenmacher in 1902. She gave birth to Erich (son, born in 1903) and Gunther (son, born in 1907), and twins in 1911, Sigrid and Helmut; only Sigrid survived. Anna died on 27 May 1957, in Kuchhausen, Germany.

Erich, who was a member of the left wing Socialist Workers' Party (SAP), was arrested by Nazis in 1934 and sentenced to 10 years in prison, where he died of an untreated ruptured appendix in 1944, shortly before the end of his sentence.

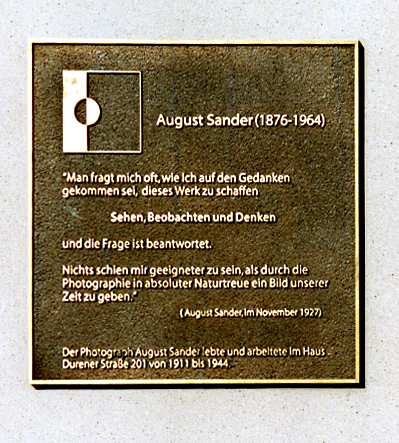
Memorial plaque at his residence in Cologne

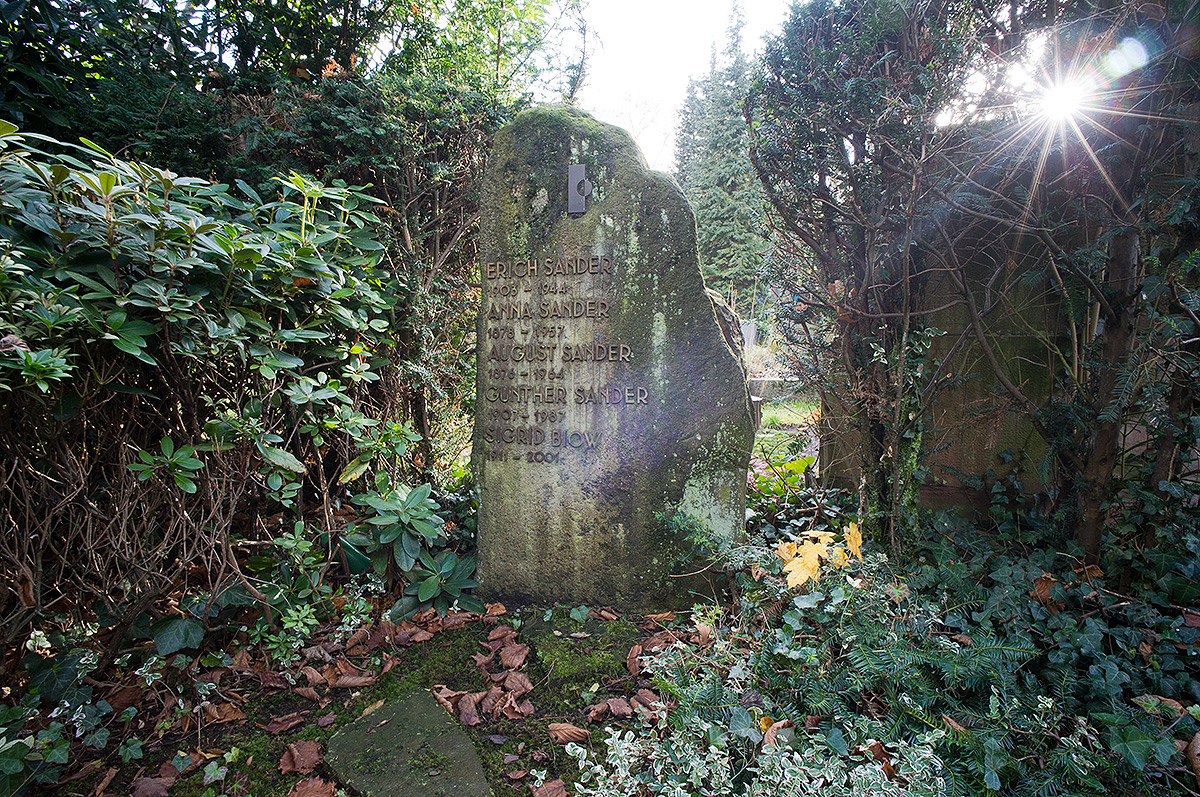
Sander's grave, Melaten Cemetery, Cologne

Sander died in Cologne of a stroke on 20 April 1964. He was buried next to his son Erich in Cologne's Melaten Cemetery.

== Legacy ==
In 1984, Sander was inducted into the International Photography Hall of Fame and Museum.

In Wim Wenders' 1987 film Der Himmel über Berlin ("Wings of Desire"), the character Homer (played by Curt Bois) studies the portraits of People of the 20th Century (1980 edition) while visiting a library.

In 2008, the Mercury crater Sander was named after him.

The highest price reached by one of his photographs was when Bricklayer sold by $749000 at Sotheby's New York, on 11 December 2014.

=== Ownership rights ===
In 1992, Gerd Sander, August's grandson, sold the archive to German nonprofit art foundation SK Stiftung Kultur. It is on display at Die Photographische Sammlung/SK Stiftung Kultur.

In 2017, Julian Sander, Gerd's son, claimed to represent August's estate, and issued a press release stating that the archive would now be housed by Hauser & Wirth. The claim has been disputed by SK Stiftung Kultur, and the ownership dispute is still ongoing.

In 2022, Julian Sander made available non-fungible tokens (NFTs) of the entire 10700 archive of Sander negatives on NFT platform OpenSea. Buying a Sander NFT was free apart from initial upload fees. However for all resale transactions thereon, via a smart contract Julian Sander would receive 7.5% of the resale cost and photographer Alejandro Cartagena's Fellowship Trust would receive 2.5%. All NFTs in the collection were claimed and, within a few weeks, over 400 ETH was traded in secondary sales on OpenSea. Soon and without warning, the archive was delisted from OpenSea because SK Stiftung Kultur claimed that as it owns the copyright to Sander's work until 2034, the NFT collection is thus in violation of copyright law. Julian Sander argues that the doctrine of fair use allows him to publish the images in such commercial settings.

== Publications ==
- Sander, August (1929). Antlitz der Zeit. Sechzig Aufnahmen deutscher Menschen des 20. Jahrhunderts [Face of Our Time] (in German). Döblin, Alfred (foreword) (1 ed.). Munich, Germany: Kurt Wolff Verlag/Transmare Verlag.
- Sander, August (1962). Deutschenspiegel: Menschen des 20. Jahrhunderts (in German). Lützeler, Heinrich (foreword) (1 ed.). Gütersloh, Germany: Sigbert Mohn Verlag. ISBN 9783765801303.
- Sander, August (1971). Menschen ohne Maske [Men Without Masks] (in German). Sander, Gunther (biography). Mann, Golo (foreword) (1 ed.). Luzern, Switzerland: C. J. Bucher Verlag. ISBN 3-7658-0130-5. (234 images)
- Keller, Ulrich (1980). Sander, Gunther (ed.). August Sander: Menschen des 20. Jahrhunderts - Portraitphotographien von 1892–1952 [August Sander: Citizens of the Twentieth Century - Portrait Photographs 1892–1952] (in German) (1 ed.). Schirmer/Mosel. ISBN 3-921375-42-8. (431 pages, hardcover edition) (A 1994 softcover exists as well under ISBN 3-8881-4723-9 / 978-3-88814723-4.)
- Conrath-Scholl, Gabriele; Dann, Otto [in German]; Frecot, Janos [in German]; Gruber, Leo Fritz [in German]; Honnef, Klaus [in German]; Lange, Susanne; Lugon, Olivier; Schütz, Otfried; Wiegand, Thomas (2001). Lange, Susanne; Conrath-Scholl, Gabriele (eds.). August Sander: Menschen des 20. Jahrhunderts - Studienband [August Sander: People of the 20th Century - Study volume] (in German). Hans-Georg Bögner (foreword) (1 ed.). Cologne, Germany: Schirmer/Mosel & Photographische Sammlung/SK Stiftung Kultur. ISBN 3-8296-0024-0. (208 pages, 695 images, hardcover with protective sheet.)
- Lange, Susanne; Conrath-Scholl, Gabriele; Sander, Gerd, eds. (2002). August Sander: Menschen des 20. Jahrhunderts [August Sander: People of the 20th Century] (in German, English, and French). Vol. I–VII (1 ed.). Cologne, Germany: Schirmer/Mosel & Photographische Sammlung/SK Stiftung Kultur. ISBN 3-8296-0006-2. (1436 pages, 619 tritone images, hardcover edition of 7 volumes in slipcase. Volume I Der Bauer (The farmer): 272 pages/115 images. Volume II Der Handwerker (The skilled tradesman): 152 pages/63 images. Volume III Die Frau (The woman): 172 pages/74 images. Volume IV Die Stände (Classes and professions): 280 pages/127 images. Volume V Die Künstler (The artists): 204 pages/90 images. Volume VI Die Großstadt (The city): 300 pages/134 images. Volume VII Die letzten Menschen (The last people): 56 pages/16 images.); Lange, Susanne; Conrath-Scholl, Gabriele; Sander, Gerd, eds. (2002). August Sander: People of the 20th Century. Vol. I–VII (1 ed.). Harry N. Abrams. ISBN 0-81096398-1. (1400 pages, hardcover edition of 7 volumes in slipcase.). A French-only edition named Hommes du XXe siècle and a Spanish-only edition named Gente del siglo XX exist as well.
- Conrath-Scholl, Gabriele; Lange, Susanne, eds. (2010). August Sander: Menschen des 20. Jahrhunderts - Die Gesamtausgabe [August Sander: People of the 20th Century - The complete edition] (in German) (Single-volume revised ed.). Schirmer/Mosel. ISBN 978-3-8296-0500-7. (Hardcover); Conrath-Scholl, Gabriele; Lange, Susanne, eds. (2013-03-30). August Sander: People of the 20th Century (Single-volume revised ed.). Schirmer/Mosel. ISBN 978-3-8296-0644-8. (808 pages, 619 duotone images, hardcover). (Reprinted in 2021.)

== Collections ==
Sander's work is held in the following permanent collection:

- Museum of Modern Art, New York: 748 works (as of 31 December 2022)
- Tate, UK: 5 prints (as of 31 December 2022)
- Metropolitan Museum of Art: 119 prints
- National Gallery of Art, Washington DC: 17 prints
- J. Paul Getty Museum

== Exhibitions ==
- August Sander—Photographs of an Epoch, 1904–1959, Philadelphia Museum of Art, 1980 and Museum of Fine Arts, Boston, 1982, among others.
- August Sander: People of the Twentieth Century—A Photographic Portrait of Germany, Metropolitan Museum of Art, New York, 2004
- August Sander, People of the 20th Century, São Paulo Art Biennial, Brazil, 2012
- Portrait.Landscape.Architecture, Multimedia Art Museum, Moscow, 2013
- Portraying a Nation: Germany 1919–1933, Tate Liverpool. Paired with work by Otto Dix.

== See also ==
- August Sander Archive
- Ismo Hölttö
- Listing of collections holding work by Sander
