= Kistefos Museum and Sculpture Park =

Contemporary art museum and sculpture park in Jevnaker, Norway

Coordinates: 60.2223519°N 10.3689884°E

Kistefos Museum
- Kistefos-Museet
- Location of the sculpture park Kistefos Museum and Sculpture Park (Norway)
- Established: 1996
- Location: Samsmoveien 41, 3520 Jevnaker, Norway
- Type: Artworks
- Accreditation: Norwegian Directorate for Cultural Heritage
- Collection size: 46 sculptures (2020)
- Visitors: 36629 (2012)
- Founder: Christen Sveaas (1925-)
- Parking: On site
- Website: www.kistefosmuseum.com

The Kistefos Museum (Norwegian: Kistefos-Museet) is a contemporary art museum and sculpture park located in Jevnaker Municipality, Norway. The art park first opened to the public in 1996 with an exhibition of 25 sculptures. Founded by Christen Sveaas, the biggest shareholder of Kistefos, a privately owned investment company, the museum sits on the site of a disused wood pulp mill and includes the Kistefossen waterfall. The 17.6-hectare art park runs around the Randselva river and the surrounding areas, including old factory buildings such as the pulp mill and other buildings leased by the Kistefos group. With donations from the Jevnaker municipality and Christen Sveaas, Kistefos holds two art galleries, a museum, and a sculpture park currently containing 46 sculptures, by both Norwegian and international artists. Kistefos Museum was listed as one of ten technical and industrial cultural heritage sites by the Norwegian Directorate for Cultural Heritage, acting as a modern, industrial monument worth preserving as part of Norwegian and Scandinavian culture.

== History ==
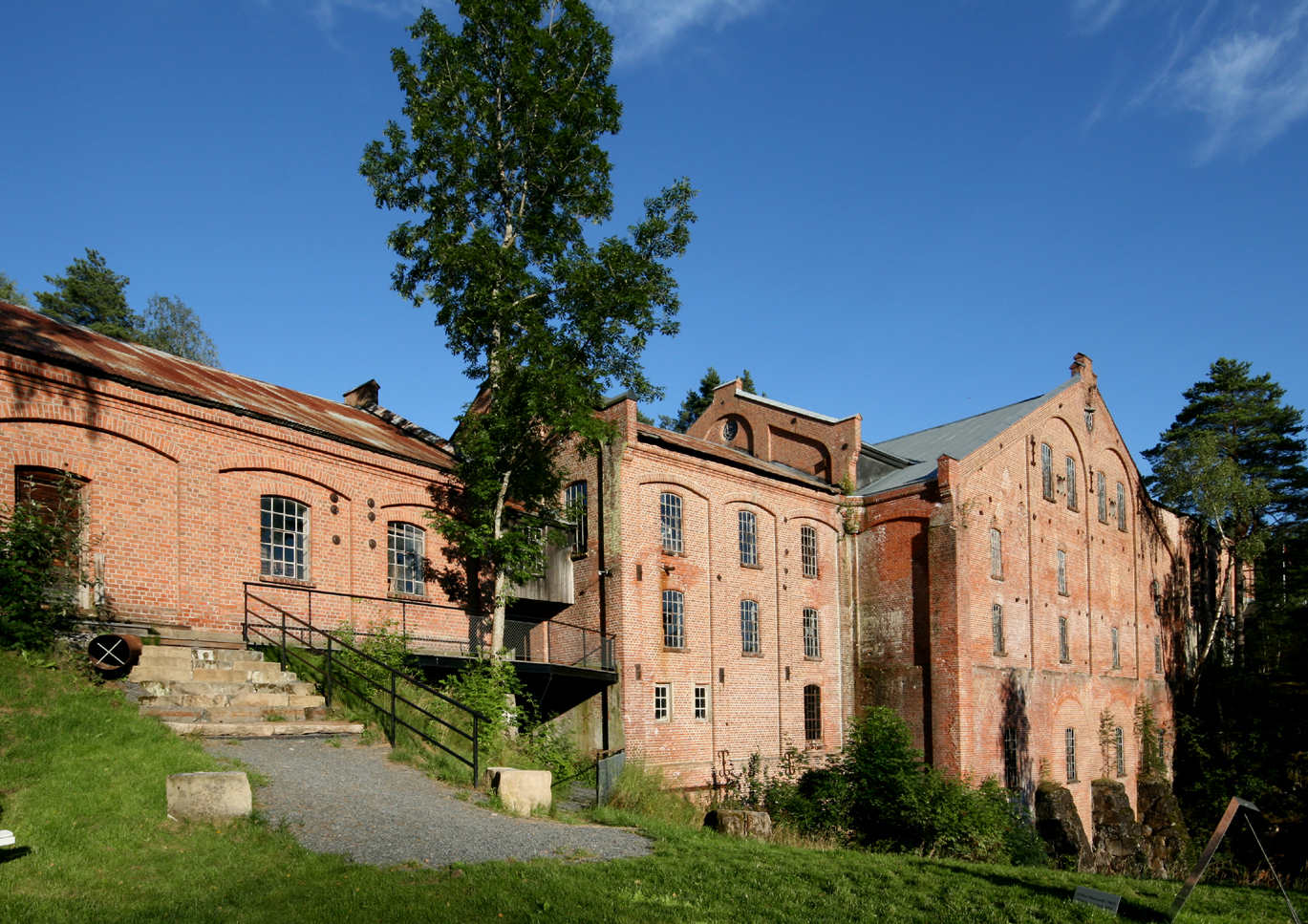
Kistefos wood pulp mill

In the early 1880s, a business entrepreneur, Anders Sveaas (1840-1917) acquired the rights to the Kistefossen waterfall in Jevnaker Municipality and to build around the surrounding land. At the time, literacy in Norway flourished, leading to the rise in demand for wood pulp for newspapers and books. Having set up a wood pulp mill before, Anders Sveaas saw the opportunity to build another pulp mill on the land. He planned to use the forest for timber, the waterfall as a source of power, and the Randselva river as a mean to transport materials at low costs. Founding the company Kistefos, he soon began the construction of a wood pulp mill, A/S Kistefos Træsliberi in 1889. Following a year of construction, operations at the mill began in 1890 and lasted until 1955, where production ceased. However, all operating materials and machines were still intact, becoming the only pulp mill left in Norway to have survived. As result of family conflict, Kistefos Træsliberi and its facilities were sold off to a neighbouring company, Viul Pulp Mill in 1983/1984. Not long after in 1993, Christen Sveaas, grandson of Anders Sveaas, managed to buy back 85% of the company's shares and now owns the majority of Kistefos Træsliberi, along with a number of other shareholders. Contributing artworks from his personal collection, reconstruction of the site soon began with the purpose of transforming the old pulp mill and the neighbouring land into an industrial museum and contemporary art park respectively. Today, Kistefos integrates the old pulp mill among 12 other old factory buildings as part of the park to maintain an important piece of Norwegian culture. Although part of the site is still dedicated to supplying power to neighbouring regions including the town of Jevnaker.

=== Inspiration ===
Christen Sveaas is a businessman and art collector who spent much of his time curating a personal collection of contemporary artworks. Sveaas' aim with the creation of the museum was to create both a modernized museum, while also maintaining its surrounding cultural heritage. In an interview by Georgina Adam from the Financial Times London, Sveaas stated “any rich man can build a sculpture park anywhere in the world; no one but me can build one around an intact 1889 factory”. Whilst many works in the museum may draw upon Sveaas' own collection, this is not the intention for the museum but rather for all artworks to be inspired by the Kistefos site. In another interview by Jonathon Bastable from Christie's, Sveaas said "everything I commission must be site-specific. I want the artist to be triggered by the picturesque landscape and its history", sharing his philosophy of the park and its works.

== Donations ==
Founded by Christen Sveaas', the company AS Kistefos is the museum's main sponsor, regularly donating hefty sums and site-specific sculptures over the years. With the museum gaining more recognition over time, this attracted many sponsors and contributors, including Anders Sveaas’ Allmennyttige Fond, home municipality Jevnaker, Sparebank 1 Jevnaker Lunner, Ringerike Sparebank, Gran Municipality, and the Regional Council for Hadeland, UNI foundation and Sat Sapienti foundation. The Directorate for Cultural Heritage also contributes annual grants of NOK 1 million upwards each year since 2006 for the rehabilitation and maintenance of buildings.

Many foundations and individuals such as The Fritt Ord Foundation and Theo Eiendom, also sponsor printed materials and catalogs used for exhibitions and such at Kistefos.

== Architecture ==
=== Nybruket Gallery ===
Located in one of the old factory buildings of Kistefos Træsliberi, Nybruket Gallery was another old wood pulp mill established in 1896. Similar to the first pulp mill, this mill was also fully equipped and intact, contributing to the park's industrial heritage. Before the newly installed museum by BIG, Nybruket was the building where all of Kistefos' seasonal exhibitions were held. Now, smaller or secondary exhibitions are held at Nybruket in their Art Hall.

=== The Twist Museum ===
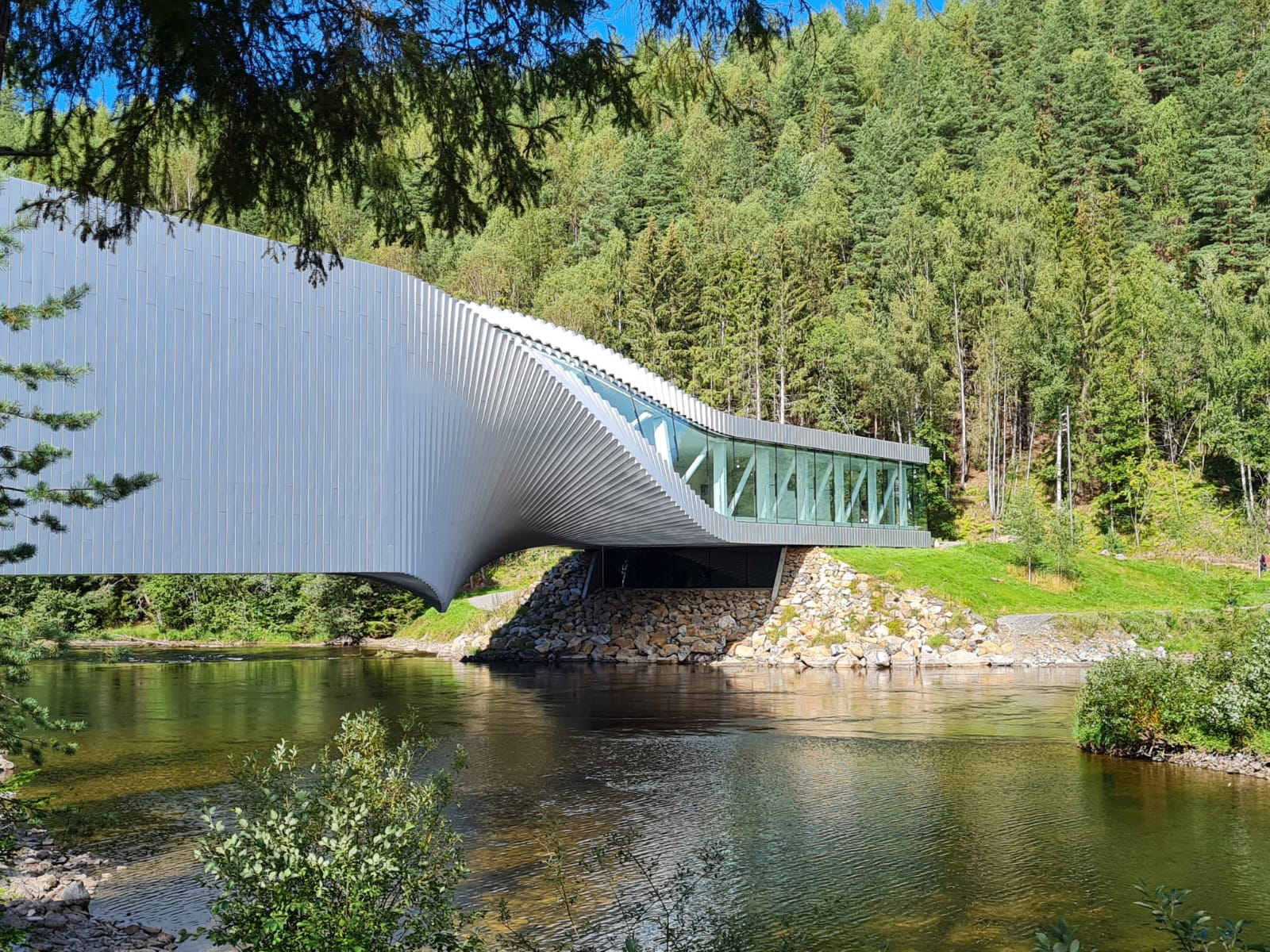
'The Twist' bridge art gallary designed by architectural firm Bjarke Ingels Group (BIG).

Kistefos' most iconic building, 'The Twist', is the museum's latest art gallery designed by architectural firm Bjarke Ingels Group (BIG). The Twist opened to the public on September 18, 2019 with an exhibition titled 'Hodgkin & Creed - Inside Out' featuring the works of artists Howard Hodgkin and Martin Creed. In 2014, Kistefos' organised an international competition for the design of a new museum to add to the site. Kistefos was in need of a bigger, more modern museum to accommodate their ever growing collection of artworks, and there was also a need for a second bridge to complete the circulation of the park and allow visitors to explore more efficiently. The winning entry, submitted by BIG, combined both aspects into one structure, proposing a unique bridge-like building spanning across the Randselva river with a twist in the middle. The project was led by Brian Yang, with Bjarke Ingels and David Zahle as partners in charge, and was revealed to the public in 2015, with construction beginning in 2016. The building was called a "hybrid of architecture, infrastructure and sculpture" and is intended to serve as an attraction of the park in of itself.

BIG incorporates the twist skilfully into the 14000 square-meter building, accounting for the difference in elevation of the riverbanks on either side, the 90-degree twist in the middle allows for the width of building to be placed on the lower riverbank while the length is placed on the higher, artistically accommodating for Kistefos' natural landscape. Current members of Toldy Construct team also contributed to this project. They helped to realize specialised construction and design elements of the facade and roof.Additionally, it creates an array of spaces, allowing for two to three stacked floors in the south, lower riverbank, and a floor-to-ceiling horizontal gallery in the north, higher riverbank. The large horizontal gallery can be used for sculptures and large installations, while the smaller vertical galleries are used for media, paintings, and sculptures, and also holds an information center, museum shop, and other facilities.

The glazed-glass sides of the museum follow the warping of the twist, creating a side-lit space at the northern, which provides views of the old pulp mill further up along the river, sky-lit space at the southern part of the building and a dark gallery on the lower level. Furthermore, the glazed parts of the building are fitted with UV-reflecting coating and a shading system, to control solar radiation.

The Twist holds three galleries: Closed Gallery (south entrance), Twist Gallery, and Panorama Gallery (north entrance).

==== Construction ====
The contractor for this project was Bladt Industries, an international steel contractor, with Ramboll Group as their main engineering adviser. The museum-bridge is designed as a truss girder bridge, with Ramboll designing the 24-meter length steel structure which twists 90-degrees mid span.

The engineering team had a challenge of converting the complex geometry from the architectural model to an engineering model complete with building calculations. The issue was solved using Grasshopper, visual programming application, for the conversion to a Tekla model, a modelling software, which is compatible with the calculation and structural analysis software Robot. Assembly of the bridge was another challenge, as it required a sizeable interim bridge to support the museum bridge during construction. The interim bridge had to be of suitable design and assembly to give sufficient stability and enough working space to mount the steel components and aluminium and glass facades. A full-scale trial assembly of the twisted bridge-part exposed no issues that could not be corrected to avoid costly modifications on site. Furthermore, as none of the individual pieces were right-angled and there were no angular repetitions or fixed points on the bridge, the use of 3D modelling was necessary to ensure the complex geometry of the structure corresponds to the design models.

With the structure made entirely of steel, secondary steel was also designed for use as standard ceilings and walls, to cover both inside and outside of the building, and this smaller project took approximately 20% of the total design time.

== Works ==
=== Exhibitions ===
Each year, Kistefos Museum organises a main seasonal exhibition and sometimes a secondary exhibition in one of their exhibition halls.

In order of release.

- Håkon Bleken - Retrospective (2006). Artist: Håkon Bleken
- Behind the Window – Norwegian Interiors from Tidemand to Tandberg (2007). Artists include: Adolph Tidemand, Odd Tandberg, Harriet Backer, Christian Krogh, Ida Lorentzen and Mikkel McAlinden
- The Dance through the Home of the Dead – Aksel Waldemar Johannessen – Painter of the Working Class (2007). Artist: Aksel Waldemar Johannessen
- Thore Heramb – The Colour Composer (2008). Artists include: David LaChapelle, Torbjørn Rødland, Marilyn Minter and Sverre Bjertnæs
- Modern Myths (2008). Artists include: David LaChapelle, Torbjørn Rødland, Marilyn Minter and Sverre Bjertnæs
- Art for the People! - Highlights from Harry Fett’s collection of paintings (2009). Artists include: Matthias Stoltenberg, Peder Balke, Erik Werenskiold, Harriet Backer, Christian Krohg, Harald Sohlberg, Edvard Munch, Ludvig Karsten, Henrik Sørensen, Reidar Aulie and Axel Revold
- Parallels: Young contemporary paintings from Norway/Leipzig (2010). Artists include: Sverre Bjertnæs, Christer Glein, Veslemøy Sparre Jansen, Christer Karlstad, Øystein Tømmerås, Tilo Baumgärtel, Tim Eitel, Christoph Ruckhäberle, David Schnell and Matthias Weischer
- All of Nature Flows Through Us (2011). Artist: Marc Quinn
- Ai Weiwei – Interlacing (2012). Artist: Ai Weiwei
- FALL OUT... (2013). Artist: Fredrik Raddum
- Marina Abramovic – Entering the Other Side (2014). Artist: Marina Abramovic
- The Icons of Rock – from Stones to Winehouse (2016). Artists: Bent Rej and Soren Solkær
- Jeppe Hein – Reflection (9 May 2016 - 9 December 2016). Artist: Jeppe Hein
- Human Nature: Doing, Undoing and Redoing (26 October 2017 - 20 November 2017). Artist: Louise Bourgeois
- Engine (27 May 2018 - 1 October 2018). Artist: Wilhelm Sasnal
- TEMPO TEMPO TEMPO (26 May 2019 - 17 November 2019). Artists: Ragna Bley, Marthe Ramm Fortun, Ane Graff, Yngve Holen, Sandra Mujinga, Urd J. Pedersen, Eirik Sæther, and Fredrik Værslev
- Inside Out (18 September 2019 - 17 November 2019). Artists: Howard Hodgkin and Martin Creed
- Come Out! (24 May 2020 - 13 December 2020). Group exhibitions with selection of works from the Christen Sveaas Art Foundation.
- Flowers in The Attic (21 June - 13 December 2020). Artist: Nathalie Djurberg & Hans Berg.
- Liquid Life (23 May - 17 October 2021). Group exhibition with works by Sandra Mujinga, Cécile B. Evans, Laure Prouvost, Pierre Huyghe, Olivia Erlanger, Ane Graff, Max Hooper Schneider and Samson.
- No One Is An Island (05 June - 17 October). Group exhibition with works from the Christen Sveaas Art Foundation. Artists: Helen Johnson, Ilya Kabakov, Elliot Hundley, Helen Marten, Alex Da Corte, Grayson Perry, Sverre Bjertnæs, Gina Beaver, Laura Owens og Peter Fischli & David Weiss.
- Paulina Olowska - Her Hauntology (30 April - 16 October 2022). Artist: Paulina Olowska.
- Do Ho Suh (30 April - 16 October 2022). Artist: Do Ho Suh.
- Tony Cragg - MATERIAL IN MIND (29 April - 29 October 2023). Artist: Tony Cragg.
- Tracing Absence (29 April - 15 October 2023). Group exhibition with works from the Christen Sveaas Art Foundation. Artists: Per Inge Bjørlo, Sophie Calle, Nan Goldin, Andreas Gursky, Ilkka Halso, Rune Johansen, Ola Kolehmainen, Mikkel McAlinden, Zanele Muholi, Joseph Sergi, Aase Texmon Rygh, Wolfgang Tillmans, James White, Richard Wright, Francesca Woodman, Yiskāh (alias Jessica Beechey).
- COPY PASTE (29 April - 29 October 2023). Group exhibition with works from the Christen Sveaas Art Foundation. Artists: Andy Warhol, Martin Kippenberger, Robert Rauschenberg, Ed Ruscha, Matias Faldbakken, Cerith Wyn Evan.
- Hurvin Anderson: Salon Paintings (4 May - 13 October 2024). Artist: Hurvin Anderson.
- Springbrett 2024: Has My Place Forgotten Me? (14 June - 13 October 2024). Group exhibition with works from the Christen Sveaas Art Foundation. Artists: Anna-Eva Bergman, Taner Ceylan, Gardar Eide Einarsson, Theaster Gates, Anish Kapoor, Christian Lemmerz, Ken Matsubara, Simphiwe Ndzube, Hannah Ryggen, Kuldeep Singh, Kjell Torriset, Ahmed Umar, Fredrik Værslev.
- Pipilotti Rist - (y)our lungs sound in an infinite forest (14 June - 13 October 2024). Artist: Pipilotti Rist.
- Christina Quarles – Living in the Wake (4 May - 12 October 2025). Artist: Christina Quarles.
- Kathleen Ryan. Museum Survey (4 May - 12 October 2025). Artist: Kathleen Ryan.
- Springbrett 2025: Ring of Fire (14 June - 12 October 2025). Group exhibition with works from the Christen Sveaas Art Foundation. Artists: Olafur Eliasson, Korakrit Arunanondchai, Robin Rhode, Nikhil Vettukattil, Elina Waage Mikalsen and Lesia Vasylchenko.
- When I’m In My Painting (9 May - 11 October). Group exhibition with works by Ragna Bley, Ida Ekblad, Oscar Murillo, and Albert Oehlen.
- Issy Wood - Fish, Fish, Duck (9 May - 11 October). Artist: Issy Wood.
- Springbrett 2026: Dark Adaptation (19 June - 11 October). Group exhibition with works by Jack Whitten, Doris Guo, Glenn Ligon, Solveig Lønseth, Lorna Simpson, and Wolfgang Tillmans.

=== Sculptures ===
In order of unveiling.

- Ståle Kyllingstad – “Installation” (1948)
- Nils Aas – “Consul Anders Sveaas, 1840-1917” (2001)
- Nico Widerberg – “Time” (2001)
- Beate Juell – “Stallion” (2001)
- Krstian Blystad – “Playing Horse” (2001)
- Bjarne Melgaard – “Octopusm” (2001)
- Kjell Nupen – “Stille, Stille/Mediteraneo” (translation: Quiet, Quiet and Mediterraneo) (2001)
- Edgar Ballo – “Blå Tulipan” (translation: Blue Tulip) (2002)
- Fernando Botero – “Stor Torso / Kvinnetorso” (translation: Female Torso) (2002)
- Siri Bjerke – “Samuraiens Ridedyr, Den Tredje Dagen" (translation: Samurai Mounts, The Third Day) (2003)
- Anne-Karin Furunes – “Christen Sveaas” (2003)
- Olafur Eliasson – “Viewing Machine” (2004)
- Fabrizio Plessi – “Movimenti Della Memoria” (2005)
- Elmgreen Og Dragset (Michael Elmgreen and Ingar Dragset) – “Forgotten Babies #2” (2005)
- Shintaro Miyake – “Welcome to Our Planet” (2006)
- Kristin Günther – “Hasten” Unveiled (2006), Permanent (2016)
- Petroc Sesti – “Energy-Matter-Space-Time” (2007)
- Tony Cragg – “Bent of mind” (2007)
- Tony Cragg – “I’m Alive” (2007)
- Tony Cragg – “Articulated Column” (2007)
- Anish Kapoor – “S-Curve” (2008)
- Elmgreen Og Dragset – “Warm Regards” (2008)
- Oldenburg Og Van Bruggen (Claes Oldenburg and Coosje van Bruggen) – “Tumbling Tacks” (2009)
- Marc Quinn – “All of Nature Flows Through Us” (2011)
- Thomas Bayrle – “Sternmotor Hochamt” (2011)
- Fredrik Raddum – “Teddy – Beast of The Hedonic Treadmill” (2013)
- Fredrik Raddum – “Catastrophic Road Signs, Sun” (2013)
- John Gerrard – “Pulp Press (Kistefos)” Video Sculpture (2013)
- Per Inge Bjørlo – “Slektstrea, Genbanken” (2014)
- Marianne Heske – “Homage to Leo The Lion” Art Film 2006, (2014)
- Philip King – “Free to Frolic” (2015)
- A Kassen – “River Man” (2016)
- Jeppe Hein – “The Path to Silence” (2016)
- Jeppe Hein – “Modified Social Benches” (2016)
- Tony Cragg – “Castor & Pollux” (2017)
- Ilya Kabakov – “The Ball” (2017)
- Lynda Benglis – “Face Off” (2018)
- Yayoi Kusama – "Shine of Life" (2019)
- Mark Manders – "Silent Studio" (2019)
- Carol Bove – "Untitled" (2021)
- Magne Furuholmen – "The Birthright" (2021)
- Ida Ekblad – "A DEADLY SLUMBER OF ALL FORCES" (2021)
- Pierre Huyghe – "Variants" (2022)
- Tone Vigeland – "Skulptur I" (2022)
- Marianne Heske – "Blue" (2023)
- Tatiana Trouvé – "The Guardian & Bench" (2024)
- Kader Attia – "Whistleblower" (2024)
- Nairy Baghramian – "Resting Arms" (2025)
- Dana Schutz – "Blind Boat" (2026)
- Cory Arcangel – "X" (2026)
- Skuja Braden – "Above the Below / Sanctum of Flow" (2026)
- Marguerite Humeau – "The Garden of Resuscitation" (2026)
