= Foxy Production =

Contemporary art gallery in New York City

Coordinates: 40°45′7.01″N 74°0′22.4″W

Foxy Production is a New York contemporary art gallery founded by Michael Gillespie and John Thomson.

Foxy Production, established in 2003, is currently located in Chinatown, New York City. Windowed on three sides and housed within a landmark Victorian building, the gallery space is designed by London architects Matheson Whiteley. Foxy Production inaugurated its gallery program in January 2003 after a series of intermittent projects between 2001 and 2002. The gallery opened in Brooklyn and then moved to Manhattan in September 2003. In January 2006 it opened a new ground floor space in west Chelsea before moving to Chinatown.

Gallery artists include Hany Armanious, Gina Beavers, Michael Bell-Smith, Olga Chernysheva, Srijon Chowdhury, Petra Cortright, Sara Cwynar, Simone Gilges, Gabriel Hartley, Violet Hopkins, Stephen Lichty, Cindy Ji Hye Kim, Ester Partegàs, Sterling Ruby, and Travess Smalley.

Besides its core program, the gallery has presented a number of curated exhibitions, including Minty (2012), Highways Connect and Divide (2011); The Phantasm (2011) Cloud (2011) Abstract Abstract (2009); Networked Nature (2007) Autonomy (2005), the Dare performance series (2005), and The Infinite Fill Show (2004). More recent group shows include Design for Living (2018) and Mature Themes (2018).
