= The Approach Gallery =

Contemporary art gallery in London, England

Coordinates: 51.5313°N 0.0516°W

The Approach Gallery is a contemporary art gallery situated above a public house of the same name in Bethnal Green, London.

== History ==
The gallery was founded in 1997 by Jake Miller and artists including Damien Meade and Ana Genoves. One of the gallery's original objectives was to offer solo exhibitions to London-based artists at the start of their careers - several of whom have gone on to achieve international success. The gallery was soon solely run by Jake Miller as the other original founder members wished to concentrate on their own careers. In 1998, the gallery began representing artists and expanded its programme internationally, exhibiting both established and emerging artists and organising group exhibitions.

In April 2006, The Approach opened a second gallery space, The Reliance, above a pub of the same name in Old Street, Shoreditch. Overseen by Approach gallery director Emma Robertson, the programme ran for 1 year and included a number of emerging international artists, premiering in London for the first time.

In November 2007, The Approach opened a short-term West End gallery space in Mortimer Street, Fitzrovia. From November 2007 to June 2009, it operated two programmes, known as The Approach E2 and The Approach W1. From November 2007 – June 2009 The Approach operated a dual programme in the East and the West, The Approach E2 and W1 respectively.

== Artists ==
Artists represented by The Approach include:

- Phillip Allen (UK)
- Helene Appel (DE)
- Sara Barker (UK)
- Sophie Bueno-Boutellier (FR)
- Stuart Cumberland (UK)
- Sara Cwynar (US)
- Peter Davies (UK)
- Anna Glantz (US)
- Patrick Hill (US)
- Allison Katz (CA)
- Caitlin Keogh (US)
- Germaine Kruip (NL)
- Rezi van Lankveld (NL)
- Jack Lavender (UK)
- Bill Lynch (US)
- Sandra Mujinga (Norway/CD)
- Dave Muller (US)
- Lisa Oppenheim (US)
- Maria Pinińska-Bereś (PL)
- Magali Reus (NL)
- Amanda Ross-Ho (US)
- John Stezaker (UK)
- Evren Tekinoktay (DK)
- Sara VanDerBeek (US)
- Sam Windett (UK)
