= Bortolami (gallery) =

Contemporary art gallery

Coordinates: 40.71915°N 74.00392°W

Bortolami is a contemporary art gallery founded in 2005 by Stefania Bortolami and Amalia Dayan.

== History ==
Before opening the gallery, Bortolami worked for Anthony d'Offay. Dayan was a director with Gagosian Gallery.

The gallery first opened a 370 m^{2} (4,000 sq ft) space at West 25th Street in Chelsea. From 2010 to 2016, the gallery operated a space on West 20th Street in Chelsea. It has since been located in a 840 m^{2} (9,000 sq ft) space at 39 Walker Street in Tribeca, but also organizes 12-month long contemporary art exhibitions in unlikely locations for its Artist/City project that pairs an artist with an American city. Artists who have participated in the project include Daniel Buren, Eric Wesley and Tom Burr.

== Artists ==
Bortolami represents numerous living artists, including:

- Richard Aldrich
- Robert Bordo
- Daniel Buren
- Tom Burr
- Morgan Fisher (artist)
- Michel François (artist)
- Piero Golia
- Nicolás Guagnini
- Lena Henke
- Ann Veronica Janssens
- Barbara Kasten
- Caitlin Keogh
- Scott King (artist)
- Ivan Morley
- Rebecca Morris
- Luigi Ontani
- Anna Ostoya
- Virginia Overton
- Claudio Parmiggiani
- Marina Rheingantz
- Aki Sasamoto (since 2019)
- Ben Schumacher
- Lesley Vance
- Eric Wesley

In addition, the gallery manages various artist estates, including:

- Mary Obering (since 2019)

In the past, the gallery has worked with the following artists and estates:

- Jutta Koether
