= Vleeshal Middelburg =

Art Gallary in Middelburg, Netherlands

Coordinates: 51°29′56″N 3°36′39″E

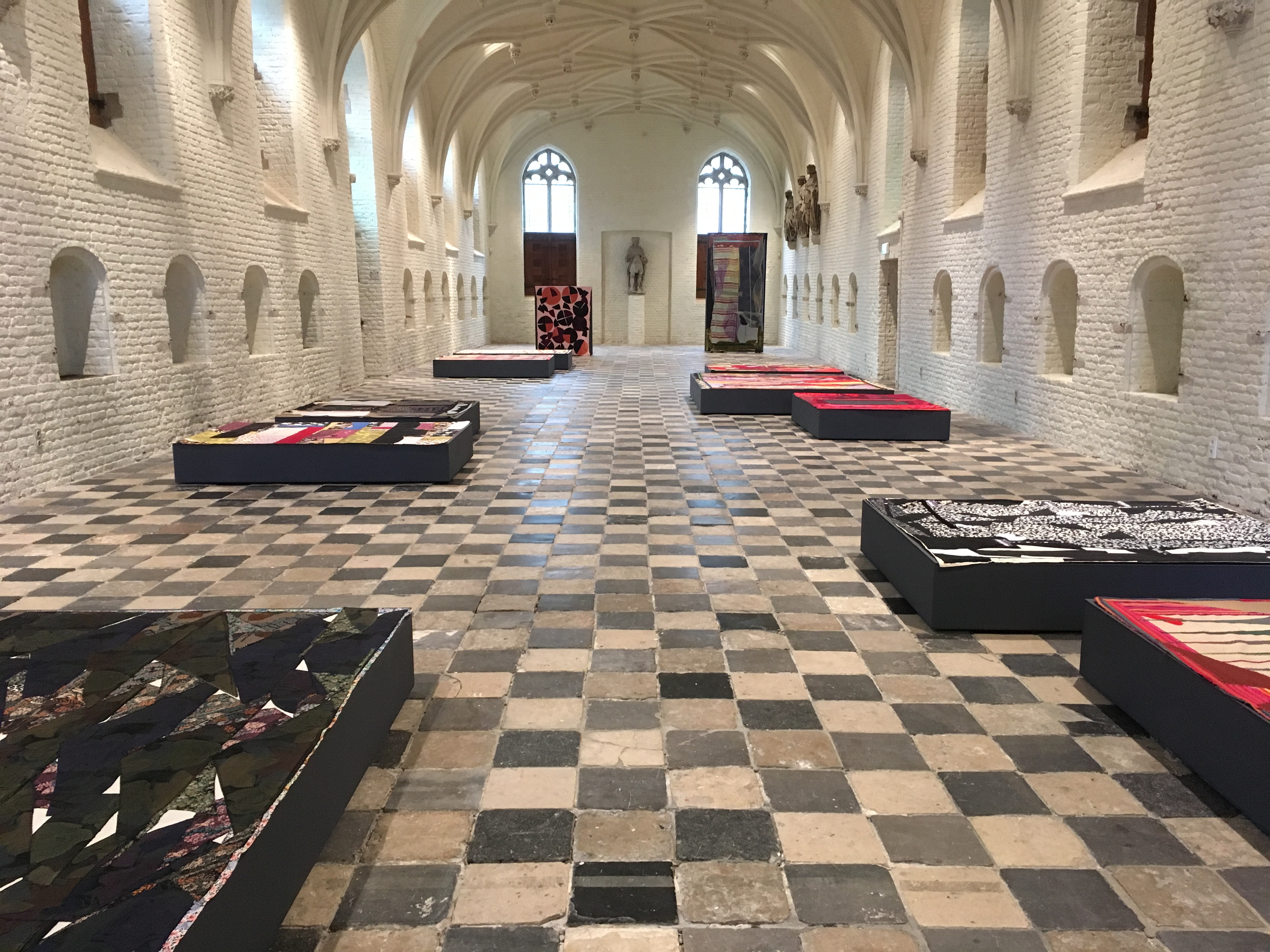
Interior of Vleeshal Middelburg with textile artworks by Noa Eshkol

The Vleeshal Center for Contemporary Art is an art museum in Middelburg, the Netherlands. The center organises exhibitions of contemporary art and an accompanying public program in a building which was formerly Middelburg's town hall, on the market square. Characterized by its distinct Gothic architecture, Vleeshal is a unique space. The venue has inspired many artists to create extraordinary exhibitions, bringing Vleeshal international renown. Under the directorship of the current director Roos Gortzak, artists such as Cally Spooner, Ola Vasiljeva, Simone Forti, Andrea Éva Györi, Matthew Lutz-Kinoy and Paul Maheke have developed new works.

Until 2017, Vleeshal also organised exhibitions in a second exhibition space: Vleeshal Zusterstraat. As a result of municipal cutbacks, Vleeshal Zusterstraat closed on October 1, 2017. The library of Vleeshal Zusterstraat was transferred to the library of Zeeland on long-term loan. This collection of publications is focussed on contemporary art and includes monographs, critical analyses, catalogues, and works on artists who have exhibited at Vleeshal.

In 2015 Vleeshal kicked off its nomadic programme, as an extension of its existing exhibition programme in Middelburg. Since then, Vleeshal has collaborated with, amongst others, Amsterdam Art Weekend, Art Rotterdam, POPPOSITIONS, and Spring Performance Festival, where performances and works by Oceans Academy of Arts (OAOA), Freddie Mercado, Les Trucs, Andreas Arndt, and Simone Forti, have been shown.

For its current and future programming, Vleeshal focuses on the relations and parallels between current developments in contemporary art and the early exhibitions in Vleeshal from the ‘70s – when experimental forms of music, dance, fine arts and performance were brought together in new and interesting ways. The themes of performance and performativity in contemporary art, which attribute a key role to the visitor, have already been a central focus point for the past few years.

As a city, Middelburg in particular offers the possibility of international and meaningful collaborations. On the one hand, Vleeshal is far removed from other presentation institutions in the larger cities of the Netherlands. On the other hand, it is centrally located between those same cities, Paris, London, and Cologne. From this position, Vleeshal has built a tradition of international collaborations with other institutions.

As the only one of its kind in Zeeland, it is of great importance to an institution like Vleeshal to also maintain a local network and to be a welcoming and interesting place for exhibitions and activities for its local audience. Vleeshal aims to do so by working with local partners and by paying attention to artists from the region. After the successful programme ‘So You Don’t Get Lost in the Neighborhood’ (SYDGL), in which local artists were invited to guide their audience to inspiring and interesting places in Zeeland, Vleeshal started ‘Rooms of Now’ in 2019. In this public programme, which will run for two years, local people are invited to open their homes for an artist's intervention. The intervention will be open to the public for two months during opening hours that will be agreed upon with the residents.

Vleeshal's other tasks involve the implementation of Middelburg's policy for art in the public space; the composition, management, maintenance, and restoration of the municipal art collection, including public artworks. Vleeshal is also responsible for the execution of council policy on subsidies to artists from Middelburg. The subsidy commission is composed of three members: Dagmar Dirkx, Maartje Korstanje and Arnisa Zeqo. Vleeshal receives financial support from the city council of Middelburg and the Dutch Ministry of Education, Culture and Science.

== Collection ==
Since 2005, the Vleeshal collection has been stored at MHKA Antwerpen as part of a long-term loan. MHKA handles the conservation and loan applications of the collection, which includes works by artists such as Mona Hatoum, Jimmie Durham, Marlow Moss, Marcel Duchamp, Nina Beier and Marie Lund, and Marinus Boezem. Works by Joëlle Tuerlinckx and Marlow Moss are currently on view at the Antwerp museum.

== Recent exhibitions ==
2021

- 'The Vleeshal Opera' with Dorothy Iannone & Juliette Blightman
- ‘I Think I Look More like the Chrysler Building’ with Kasper Bosmans, Lena Henke, Win McCarthy, Annelies Planteijdt and Diane Simpson

2020

- 'Midnight' with Sandra Mujinga
- 'Near Focus: Pipilotti Rist'
- 'Near Focus: Lili Dujourie'
- 'Near Focus: Jimmie Durham'
- 'Progressive Touch' Michael Portnoy

2019

- 'As Long As The Potatoes Grow' with Pieter Slagboom
- ‘Every Loft Needs a Sink’ curated by the artist initiative Root Canal, consisting of Anders Dickson, Frieder Haller, Henna Hyvärinen and Thomas Swinkels
- 'Allegiance & Oblivion' with Kaspar Müller
- 'A fire circle for a public hearing' with Paul Maheke

2018

- 'Sea Spray' with Matthew Lutz-Kinoy
- 'Show Personality, Not Personal Items' with Leda Bourgogne, Nora Turato and Evelyn Taocheng Wang
- 'Traumatized Lemon' with Andrea Éva Győri
- 'Paranoid House' with Anders Dickson, Philipp Gufler, Henna Hyvärinen, Becket Mingwen and Sophie Serber

2017

- Marina Pinsky
- Lili Reynaud Dewar
- 'Why Patterns' with Noa Eshkol, Daan Gielis, Radna Rumping, Damon Zuccini, Milan Grygar, Lina Lapelyte, Les Trucs, Sergei Tcherepnin and Hannah Weinberger
- Noa Eshkol
- Adriano Amaral

2016

- Amanda Ross-Ho
- 'Survival Guides for Ballroom Dancers, Renovators, Softball Moms, Working Parents and Troubled Folk in General' with Moyra Davey, Martin Kohout, Katja Novitskova, Laure Prouvost and Jay Tan
- Melissa Gordon
- Simone Forti

2015

- Oceans Academy of Arts
- Ola Vasiljeva
- Cally Spooner
- 'Violent Incident' with Rosa Aiello, Bernadette Corporation, Andrea Fraser, Jef Geys, Gil Leung, Bruce Nauman, Danh Vo
- Marinus Boezem

== Notes ==
1. Amelia Groom, 'Cally Spooner', Artforum.
