= Live Photo =

Live Photo or Live Photos may refer to:

- Live Photo (iOS), a camera feature introduced in the Apple iPhone 6s smartphone
- Live Photos, artistic projects by Crispin Gurholt
- Windows Live Photos, entry point to Microsoft OneDrive file-hosting service
- Windows Live Photo Gallery
