= Mark Manders =

Dutch artist (born 1968)

Mark Manders (born 1968 in Volkel) is a Dutch artist, currently living and working in Ronse, Belgium. His work consists mainly of installations, drawings and sculptures. He is probably best known for his large bronze figures that look like rough-hewn, wet or peeling clay. Typical of his work is also the arrangement of random objects, such as tables, chairs, light bulbs, blankets and dead animals.

== Biography ==
Working as a graphic designer in his late teens, Manders studied at the Hogeschool voor de Kunsten in Arnhem (now ArtEZ Academy of Art & Design) from 1988 to 1992. During his studies, his fascination for design and language, and particularly poetry, further developed into a visual language of his own, where words were substituted by objects. His work soon gained widespread interest and in 1992, upon graduating from the academy, the artist was awarded the second prize at the Dutch Prix de Rome in the category Art & Public Space.

Together with Roger Willems and Marc Nagtzaam he founded Roma Publications 1988, 'as a platform to produce and distribute autonomous publications made in close collaboration with a growing number of artists, institutions, writers and designers'. Looking for an affordable larger studio, Manders emigrated to Belgium in 2007, where he found an abandoned small station building in Ronse.

Manders is represented by Xavier Hufkens gallery in Brussels, Tanya Bonakdar Gallery in New York City & Los Angeles and Gallery Koyanagi in Tokyo.

== Work ==
Since 1986 Manders has been making Self-portrait as a building. The first of this series of fictional architectural plans was Inhabited for a Survey, (First Floor Plan from Self Portrait of a Building) (1986), where the plan is drawn on the floor of the gallery using pencils, crayons and other markers.

The fictional building represents a fictional artist, "Mark Manders", an alter-ego distinct from the artist Mark Manders. This fictitious character is described by the artist as a, "Neurotic, sensitive individual who can only exist in an artificial world." Each of his exhibitions includes an evolving floor plan of the self-portrait building along with various art works.

Manders uses this architecture to drive his work and allow it to make the decisions, calling it a "machine", but at the same time bringing objects to a standstill as he develops these memory spaces. Despite creating this fictional space, he insists on using "real objects" in the "real world" to make his sculptures.

I don't often show my work in the public domain, rather in museums where people choose to go to see art. But since 1991 I always test a work that I've just finished in a supermarket. I just imagine a new work there and I check if it can survive where it doesn't have the label of an artwork. It is just a thing that someone placed in a supermarket. Now I am sure that all of my works can stand in that environment." He often feels alien to the real world and its institutional art settings. He insists that his work stays the same throughout its exhibitions but gets re-contextualized each time it enters the "real world".

== Exhibitions ==
=== Solo exhibition ===
Manders solo show 'Parallel Occurrences / Documented Assignments' travelled from the Hammer Museum in Los Angeles (2010) to the Aspen Art Museum in Aspen (2011), Walker Art Center in Minneapolis (2011) and Dallas Museum of Art (2012). Another show, 'The Absence of Mark Manders', toured from Kunstverein Hannover (2007) to Kunsthall Bergen (2008), S.M.A.K. in Ghent (2008) and Kunsthaus Zürich (2009).

Other major solo exhibitions by the artist include:

- Museum of Contemporary Art Tokyo (2021)
- Duo-exhibition with Michaël Borremans at the 21st Century Museum of Contemporary Art in Kanazawa (2020)
- Bonnefanten in Maastricht (2020)
- Centro Galego de Arte Contemporanea in Santiago de Compostela (2014)
- Collezione Maramotti in Reggio Emilia (2014)
- De Vleeshal in Middelburg (2014)
- Carré d'Art – Musée d'art contemporain in Nîmes (2012)
- IMMA in Dublin (2005)
- The Art Institute in Chicago (2003)
- The Renaissance Society in Chicago (2003)
- Pinakothek der Moderne in Munich (2003)

=== Biennials ===
The artist represented the Netherlands at the 55th International Art Exhibition – la Biennale di Venezia in 2013, where he showcased 'Room with Broken Sentence', curated by Lorenzo Benedetti (1972). His work also featured in the Ateliers de Rennes in 2016, the Athens Biennial of 2007, Manifesta in 2004 and the Venice Biennial of 2001.

=== Group exhibitions ===
Amongst many others exhibitions, Manders work has featured in numerous exhibitions around the world, including

- Museum of Contemporary Art Tokyo (2019)
- Fondazione Prada in Milan (2018)
- Museu Berardo in Lisbon (2018)
- MARTa Herford (2017)
- Wiels in Brussels (2017)
- Museum Voorlinden in Wassenaar (2016)
- Kunstmuseum Bonn (2016)
- Louvre in Paris (2015)
- S.M.A.K. in Ghent (2015)
- Guggenheim Museum in New York (2015)
- Palais de Tokyo in Paris (2014)
- 21er Haus in Vienna (2014)
- The Wadsworth Atheneum Museum of Art in Hartford (2012)
- The Menil Collection in Houston (2012)
- David Roberts Arts Foundation in London (2012)
- MoMA in New York (2012)
- ICA in Philadelphia (2011)
- DESTE Foundation in Athens (2011)
- Kunsthalle Bern (2010)

== Awards ==
Manders work has been awarded with numerous prizes, including the Dr. A.H Heineken Prize for Art in 2010, the Philip Morris Art Prize in 2002, the Vordemberge-Gildewart Award, Switzerland in 2000, the Fondazione Sandretto Re Rebaudengo per l'Arte in Italy in 1994, the Touche Prize, The Netherlands, also in 1994, and both the Prix de Rome and the Prix Nouvelles Images in The in 1992.

== Collections ==
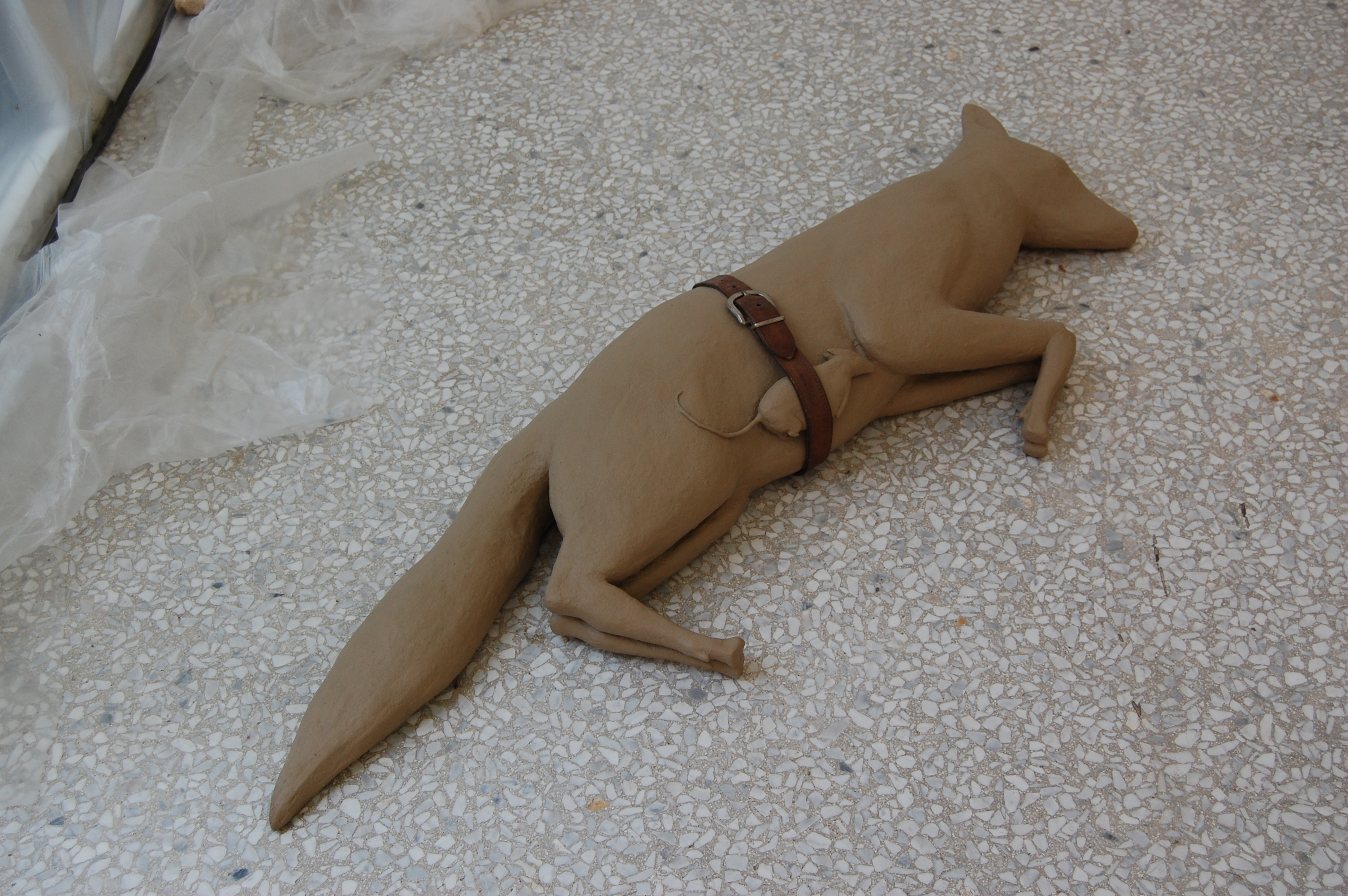
Fox/Mouse/Belt, 1992Painted bronze, and belt6 x 15 x 44" (15.2 x 38.1 x 111.8 cm)Collection of MoMA, Museum of Modern Art, New York (US)

=== Public collections ===
Manders' work is held in numerous public collections around the world, including: Aichi Prefectural Museum of Art (JP), Art Gallery of Ontario (CA), Art Institute of Chicago (US), Bonnefantenmuseum (NL), Carnegie Museum of Art (US), Centraal Museum (NL), Collezione Maramotti (IT), Dallas Museum of Art (US), David Roberts Art Foundation (GB), The Donum Estate(US), Domus Collection (CN), Fondation Louis Vuitton (FR), Fondazione Sandretto Re Rebaudengo (IT), FRAC Bourgogne (FR), Galleria Civica d'Arte Moderna e Contemporanea (IT), Guggenheim Museum (US), Kistefos Museum and Sculpture Park (NO), Hammer Museum (US), Henry Art Gallery (US), Hudson Valley for Contemporary Art(US), IMMA, Irish Museum of Modern Art (IE), Julia Stoschek Collection (DE), Kunsthaus Zürich (CH), Kunstmuseum Bonn (DE), Magasin 3 Stockholm Konsthall(SE), M HKA, Museum of Contemporary Art (BE), Moderna Museet (SE), Museum of Contemporary Art (US), MOT, Museum of Contemporary Art (JP), MoMA, Museum of Modern Art, New York (US), Museum Boijmans Van Beuningen (NL), Museum of Contemporary Art Santiago de Compostela (ES), Museum of Contemporary Art, Chicago (US), Museum of Fine Arts, Houston (US), Museum Hedendaagse Kunst De Domijnen(NL), Museum voor Moderne Kunst, Arnhem (NL), Museum Voorlinden (NL), Mu.ZEE (BE), National Gallery of Art Washington D.C (US), Noordbrabants Museum 's Hertogenbosch (NL), Olbricht Collection (DE), Over Holland Collection (NL), PAMM, Perez Art Museum (US), Philadelphia Museum of Art (US), Pinnell Collection, Dallas (US), Pinakothek der Moderne (DE), Rabobank Collection (NL), Rubell Museum (US), Sammlung Goetz (DE), S.M.A.K., Municipal Museum of Contemporary Art (BE), SFMOMA, San Francisco Museum of Modern Art (US), Stedelijk Museum (NL), Stedelijk Museum De Lakenhal (NL), Stedelijk Van Abbemuseum (NL), The Margulies Collection at the Warehouse (US), The Menil Collection (US), Wadsworth Atheneum Museum of Art (US), Walker Art Center (US).

=== Work in the public domain ===
- In 2019 Public Art Fund commissioned Mark Manders to create a large public sculpture for the Doris C. Freedman Plaza in Central Park, New York.
- In 2017 Manders created two large sculptures for Walker Art Center in Minneapolis (2017) and for the Rokin Square in Amsterdam (2017).
