= Crispin Gurholt =

Norwegian painter and scenographer

Crispin Gurholt (born 18 January 1965 in Oslo) is a Norwegian artist based in Oslo and Berlin, known for his Live Photo projects since 2000. Live Photos are site-specific, live installations, where the artist stages people in carefully directed tableaus. The settings are often trivial and ordinary – a bookshop, a street corner, a hairdresser's. The models, posing in a frozen photographic moment, are viewed by the audience through a natural or artificial barrier such as a shop window or a sheet of mounted plexiglass. The live performances normally have a duration of two hours.

== Performance ==
A Live Photo starts as a live performance; the performance is then photographed and filmed; and later translated into paintings and texts. Through this combination of formats, new stories and layers of meaning emerge.

Live Photo subjects throw a critical light on society's repressive mechanisms and power hierarchies, such as racism, domestic violence and issues raised by globalised economic or institutionalised structures. Live Photo deals with the relation between reality and fiction and the idea of time, moment and memory.

Live Photo can also be seen in the context of the historical tableau vivant.

== Career ==
Crispin Gurholt studied at the Norwegian National Academy of Fine Arts (1993-1998) and New York University, SCE Film School (1996). He has presented his live installations, photographs and videos in Europe, South America and Canada, The Henie Onstad Art Center, Art Copenhagen, Art Forum Berlin, Art Cologne, New Positions, The Stenersen Museum, Art Foundation Mallorca, The Vigeland Museum, The North Norwegian Art Museum, Lillehammer Art Museum, Kunstnernes Hus, Haus feur Kunst Uri, Kistefos Museum, The National Theatre and Haugar Vestfold Art Museum. Gurholt participated in the 11th Havana Biennial, The Venice Biennial Collateral Event Program in 2007. Film festivals: MIRfestival, 19th Nordisk Panorama, 27e Festival International du Film sur l’Art (FIFA), L’Étrange Festival, Les Rencontres Internationales Berlin/Paris/Madrid, Festival Internacional de Cine Documental de Buenos Aires, The Norwegian Short Film Festival in Grimstad. Collections: Arts Council Norway, The Art Collection of Oslo Municipality, Statoil Art Collection, Lillehammer Art Museum, Vestfold Haugar Art Museum, The North Norwegian Art Museum, Christen Sveaas Art Collection and Selmer's Art Collection

The artist has also made production design for several Norwegian films and stage productions, and produced and directed music videos, including videos like Get it On for the Norwegian band Turbonegro.

== Publications ==
- Eiebakke, Anders. Crispin Gurholt, Live Photo Volume I, Transparent Productions, 2006 ISBN 82-303-0636-2
- Brundtland Malm, Cecilie. Norwegian Art Photography 1970-2007, Arnoldsche, 2007, ISBN 978-3-89790-021-9
- Wendt, Selene. Crispin Gurholt, Live Photo Volume II, Skira Editore, 2009, ISBN 978-82-90128-66-6
- Barragan, Paco. When a Painting Moves, CHARTA, 2011, ISBN 978-88-8158-816-9
- Utne, Janeke Meyer. Crispin Gurholt, Live Photo Lillehammer, Lillehammer Art Museum, 2012, ISBN 978-82-91388-68-7
- Wendt, Selene. Fresh Paint, CHARTA, 2012, ISBN 978-88-8158-844-2
- Nyaas Lyngstad, Tone. Munch by Others, Arvinius+Orfeus, 2013, ISBN 978-91-980756-3-2
