= Gilges =

Gilges is a surname. Notable people with the surname include:

- Hilarius Gilges (1909–1933), German actor, dancer and activist
- Keith R. Gilges, American diplomat
- Konrad Gilges (born 1941), German politician
- Simone Gilges (1973–2023), German contemporary artist
