= Djurberg =

Djurberg is a surname. Notable people with the surname include:

- Bengt Djurberg (1898–1941), Swedish actor and singer
- Nathalie Djurberg (born 1978), Swedish-born artist
