= Sara Cwynar =

Canadian photographer (born 1985)

Sara Cwynar is a contemporary artist who works with photography, collage, installation and book-making. Cwynar was born in Vancouver, Canada in 1985 and currently lives and works in Brooklyn, New York. Cwynar's work presents a marriage of old and new forms that are intended to challenge the way that people encounter visual and material culture in everyday life.

== Early life and education ==
Cwynar grew up in Vancouver, Canada. She studied English literature at the University of British Columbia and eventually earned a Bachelor of Design Honours degree from York University in Toronto in 2010. She earned an MFA in Photography from Yale University in 2016. Cwynar has previously worked as a freelance graphic designer for The New York Times.

== Work ==
Cwynar uses a variety of media, including photography, collage, book-making and installation, to explore the nature of photographic images and the power and limitations of the medium itself. Cwynar's background in literature and graphic design helps to create the fascinating hybridity of her pieces. Through the use of saved personal photographs and found images from both printed resources and the internet, her work communicates not only about the final image of a photograph but also about the process of image making. Cwynar is also known for repurposing items bought through sites such as eBay.

Cwynar's artwork explores the effects that consumerism (often being softly misogynistic) has on shaping subconscious ideals of beauty and self-image that have become ingrained in society, especially in women. Her work engages with the modern feminist movement as she directly challenges what is being sold to consumers both physically and ideologically in the current media, encouraging viewers to venture below the surfaces of capitalism and modern image culture in order to discover and determine what is “real.”

Cwynar had an exhibition in 2014 at Flat Death at Foxy Production in New York. The exhibition had its ideological roots in Kitsch Encyclopedia and explored “a kind of ‘ritual extermination’ upon the hyperreal by confusing representation and reality.” Like Cwynar’s work in general, this show was a mix of photography, collage, rephotography, appropriation and studio set-ups.

Cwynar's 2015 project Presidential Index featured photographs of Avon Presidential Bust Cologne bottles that she bought on eBay and removed the heads of the presidents so that only their torsos are visible. In some pieces, she enlarged the busts to be as large as her own torso and in others she arranged the bottles according to the popularity of that president’s scent. She paired these images with pictures of a make-up palette from “Ultra Cosmetics” and two photographs of rugs. Cwynar's ideas behind this piece link these objects to the desire for aesthetic change through commercial and material goods.

Her work is in the permanent collection at the Dallas Museum of Art; Foam Fotografiemuseum Amsterdam; Milwaukee Art Museum; MoMA Collection, New York; Minneapolis Institute of Art; SFMOMA, San Francisco; Guggenheim Museum, New York; Art Gallery of Ontario, Toronto; Fondazione Prada, Milan; Baloise Art Collection, Basel, Switzerland; Kadist Art Foundation, San Francisco; Nerman Museum of Contemporary Art, Kansas City; Zabludowicz Collection, London; Centre Pompidou, Paris; MMK Museum für Moderne Kunst, Frankfurt Soho House, Toronto; and TD Bank Canada Collection, Toronto.

Cwynar adds Girl from contact sheet 3 adds to her exhibition "Flat death" in 2018 as well as adding 3 others. The MoMa holds a distorted chromogenic print of a young girl working in tangent with her other three prints. All sharing resemblances to one another.

Cwynar's first live performance titled Down at the Arcade (2021) was commissioned by Performa for Performa 21. With the performance curated by Job Piston and produced by Bob Kalas, Cwynar transformed a retail establishment using her visuals and language.

=== Short films ===
Soft Film (2016) was first exhibited at Art Basel's Statements and was awarded the 2016 Baloise Art Prize. Through the constant rearranging of items such as velvet jewelry boxes, Cwynar introduces the topic of "soft misogyny" — or subtle discrimination against women, particularly in the workplace — by comparing it to the soft texture of the boxes. While Cwynar physically stars as the protagonist of the film, a male voice frequently overpowers hers in the background narration. In her book Glass Life, Cwynar expresses her desire to simultaneously use Soft Film as a means of portraying how the value of items is ever-changing due to the cyclical nature of capitalism and social movements.

Rose Gold (2017) was one of Cwynar's solo exhibitions at Foxy Production. Its narration is composed of quotes from and references to authors such as Lauren Berlant, Toni Morrison, Judy Wacjman, and Ludwig Wittgenstein, all while adopting the nature of an educational film. Using the original rose gold iPhone that was released in 2015 as its primary focus, Cwynar's film examines themes of capitalism, feminism, power, and technology through the lens of color.

Red Film (2018), the third installation in the informal trilogy, was originally included as part of the exhibition To Our Parents at the 33rd Bienal de São Paulo, curated by Alejandro Cesarco. It was subsequently shown in 2019 at the Flaherty Film Seminar, the International Film Festival Rotterdam, the Edinburgh International Film Festival, and the IV Moscow International Experimental Film Festival. In 2021, it was screened for two weeks at the MoMA as part of the Hyundai Card Video Views series. In Red Film, Cwynar further critiques the persuasive nature of capitalism and the pressure to conform and consume by depicting subjects such as red-colored commodities, dancing women cloaked in red clothing, and makeup being manufactured. Cwynar barrages viewers with overlapping voices, images, and thoughts, suggesting that life has many layers in which the perception of reality becomes skewed. Through the use of film and nostalgic colors, she draws her audience in and makes them feel as though they can trust what is being shown, despite the narration saying otherwise.

== Publications ==
In 2014, Cwynar published Kitsch Encyclopedia with Blonde Art Books. This book is an A-Z directory of examples of the concept of “kitsch,” as loosely defined by Milan Kundera as “the familiar images we look at in order to ignore all that is not aesthetically appealing about life.” Also incorporating ideology from Jean Baudrillard and Roland Barthes, Cwynar’s take on this revolves around the idea that objects and events as portrayed in the media have become more “real” than those tangible items or historical events as they existed in the physical world.

In 2021, Cwynar published Glass Life with Aperture Foundation. Glass Life provides a large amount of insight regarding the meaning and inspiration behind Cwynar’s artwork, particularly her three short films Soft Film, Rose Gold, and Red Film. Included are stills from the films themselves alongside annotated transcripts. The book also includes the essay “On Beauty and Being Glitched: Sara Cwynar” by Legacy Russell as its introduction, and the essay “Should Artists Shop or Stop Shopping?” by Sheila Heti as its conclusion.

== Selected exhibitions ==
- 2022 – Sara Cwynar: Apple Red/Grass Green/Sky Blue. ICA LA, Los Angeles, CA.
- 2021 – Sara Cwynar. Foxy Production, New York.
- 2021 – Red Film. MoMA, NY. Screening on the Museum's website in the Hyundai Card Video Views series.
- 2021 – Source. Remai Modern, Saskatoon, SK, Canada
- 2020 – Marilyn. The Approach, London, UK
- 2019 – Modern Art in Your Life. Commissioned by MoMA and streamed on the Museum's website and social media platforms.
- 2019 – Gilded Age. Organized by Amy Smith-Stewart, The Aldrich Contemporary Art Museum, Ridgefield, CT
- 2019 – Gilded Age II. Curated by Jenn Jackson, The Polygon Gallery, North Vancouver, BC, Canada
- 2019 – Good Life. Curated by Sara Dolfi Agostini, Blitz, Valletta, Malta
- 2019 – Image Model Muse. Milwaukee Art Museum, Milwaukee, WI
- 2018 – Red Film. 33rd Bienal de Sao Paulo, Sao Paulo, Brazil
- 2018 – Image Model Muse. Minneapolis Institute of Art, Minneapolis, MN
- 2018 – Rose Gold. The Approach, London, UK
- 2018 – Tracy. Oakville Galleries, Oakville, ON, Canada
- 2017 – Soft Film. MMK Museum für Moderne Kunst, Frankfurt, Germany
- 2017 – Tracy. Carl Kostyal, London, UK
- 2017 – Rose Gold. Foxy Production, New York, NY
- 2016 – “L’image volée”. Curated by Thomas Demand, Fondazione Prada, Milan, Italy
- 2016 – Three Hands. Cooper Cole, Toronto, ON
- 2016 – Soft Film. Foxy Production, New York, NY
- 2015 – Greater New York. MoMA PS1, New York, NY
- 2015 – Presidential Index. Retrospective, Hudson, NY
- 2014 – Flat Death. Foxy Production, New York, NY
- 2014 – Flat Death. Rosenwald-Wolf Gallery, The University of the Arts, Philadelphia, PA
- 2013 – Flat Death. Cooper Cole, Toronto, ON
- 2013 – Everything in the Studio (Destroyed). Foam Photography Museum, Amsterdam, the Netherlands
- 2012 – All The Greens. Printed Matter, New York, NY,
- 2012 – Accidental Archives. Cooper Cole, Toronto, ON

== Awards ==
- 2020 – Shpilman International Prize for Excellence in Photography
- 2020 – Sobey Art Award
- 2019 – Kodak Film Prize, IV Moscow International Experimental Film Festival
- 2019 – Louis Comfort Tiffany Foundation 2019 Biennial Grant
- 2018 – MAST Foundation for Photography Grant on Industry and Work
- 2018 – International Film Festival Rotterdam, Ammodo Tiger Short Prize
- 2016 – Art Director's Club Young Guns Award
- 2013 – Printed Matter Emerging Artist Publication Series Grant
- 2012 – The Camera Club of New York, Darkroom Residency, Runner-up Award
- 2011 – Print Magazine, 20 Under 30 New Visual Artist Award
- 2011 – Art Director's Club Young Guns Award
- 2009 – Kondor Fine Arts Award
- 2008–2009 – Dean's Prize for Excellence, Faculty of Fine Arts, York University
