= Lisa Oppenheim =

American multimedia artist

- Born: 1975 (age 50–51); New York City, USA
- Known for: Multimedia, Video, Photography
- Website: lisaopp.net

Lisa Oppenheim (born 1975) is an American multimedia artist.

== Early life ==
Lisa Oppenheim was born in New York City in 1975. She earned her bachelor's degree from Brown University in 1998, concentrating in Modern Culture and Media, Art and Semiotics. In 2001, she earned her MFA in Film and Video from Bard College. She completed a Whitney Museum Independent Study Program in 2003. She also completed the Rijksakademie van beeldedne kunsten in Amsterdam in 2006.

== Work ==
Oppenheim's work plays with the process of creating photographs and film. Her pieces often question the documentary genre as well as the concept of an archive. In utilizing archival sources, she interrogates and reappropriates the archival function of narrative-making and -omitting, and how narrative and imagery are intertwined, but ultimately separate.

In work such as Lunagrams, 2010, she exposed archival glass negatives using moonlight. Oppenheim experiments with time as a force of art and imagery. She has done works in fiber arts, using strings, ropes and fabric. Her works in fiber arts were displayed in her Gramma exhibition at Tanya Bonakdar Gallery.

Oppenheim had solo and group exhibitions at international venues including The Approach Gallery, the Museum of Contemporary Art Cleveland, Grazer Kunstverein, the Whitechapel Gallery, and the Museum of Modern Art,

== Recognition ==
- AIMIA/AGO Photography prize from the Art Gallery of Ontario (2014)
- Shpilman International Photography prize from the Israel Museum (2014)

== Collections ==
Her work is included in the public collections of the J. Paul Getty Museum, the Guggenheim Museum, New York the Museum of Modern Art, and the San Francisco Museum of Modern Art.
