= Aki Sasamoto =

Japanese performance artist

- Born: 1980 (age 45–46); Yokohama, Japan
- Education: Columbia University, Wesleyan University
- Known for: Performance art, Installation art

Aki Sasamoto (Japanese: 笹本 晃, Sasamoto Aki; born 1980) is a Japanese artist who was born in Yokohama and is based in New York. Sasamoto has collaborated with visual artists, musicians, choreographers, dancers, mathematicians and scholars. She is known for her installations utilizing found objects and the activation of installations through improvisational performances, from which Sasamoto explores the nuances and peculiarities of everyday life.

Sasamoto is currently a Professor in Sculpture in Yale University, School of Art. Sasamoto is also the co-founder of the nonprofit interdisciplinary arts organization Culture Push.

== Education ==
Born in 1980 in Kanagawa, Sasamoto completed her high school education at the United World College of the Atlantic in Wales, UK in 1999. At first, she studied mathematics when she moved to the United States to pursue higher education. Discovering her interest in Arts, she ended up with a BA in dance and studio art from Wesleyan University in Connecticut in 2004, and received her MFA in Visual Arts from Columbia University in 2007. That same year, she started to incorporate dialogue into her performative installations.

== Highlighted Works ==
Sasamoto has shown her work in theaters, galleries and public spaces in New York and internationally. Below are some highlighted works and exhibitions from Aki Sasamoto:

=== Love is the End of Art (2009) ===
After Sasamoto’s graduation from Columbia University, she collaborated with Momus for her first solo performance-exhibition Love is the End of Art at Zach Feuer Gallery in New York City in 2009. During this exhibition, Sasamoto acted as a main performer and revealed her strong stage presence by interacting with the strangely sculptural everyday objects while Momus took the role of art critics to frame and critique Aki’s performance.

=== Strange Attractors (2010) ===
After the success of Love is the End of Art, Aki Sasamoto was commissioned to create the unique installation-performance Strange Attractors for the 2010 Whitney Biennial. Inspired by Lorenz Attractor’s mathematical concept of strange attractors in Dynamical Systems, Strange Attractors utilized her obsessed elements including doughnuts, hemorrhoids, and psychics. Sasamoto carefully altered the found objects like doughnut-shaped cushions, cafe tables, projectors, and cameras in a sculptural way by organically arranging their placement and suspending them from the ceilings in the red fishnet sacks. With the guidance of the prepared everyday objects, Sasamoto wove together her structured improvisation, the movements, and the environment into her kaleidoscopic worldview and chaotic narratives to the audiences.

Strange Attractors was presented to Japanese audiences later at Take Ninagawa in Tokyo in 2011. Sasamoto adapted new Japanese-language materials from the eponymous piece she contributed to the last Whitney Biennial.

=== Delicate Cycle (2016) ===
Commissioned by SculptureCenter, Delicate Cycle is Aki Sasamoto’s first solo exhibition in a U.S. museum. Working closely with the site SculptureCenter in New York, Sasamoto created a new body of performances and installations mimicking the rolling movements of the dung beetle as the starting point of her exhibition. From the perspective of the dung beetle, she activated the life-size washroom sculpture units in the building by climbing within and upon those washing and drying machines and chatting about dirt and stains. The exhibition also included a new video and other sculptures that jointly expressed the abject and repression.

=== Sounding Lines (2024) ===
Situated between sculpture and performance, Sounding Lines is the first major solo presentation of Aki Sasamoto at Para Site in Hong Kong and features a newly commissioned installation and performance. Filled with springs and kitchen utensilsIn, the floating objects are moved around by motorized arm whips and demonstrate different harmonic patterns seen in waves and in friendships. Engaging viewers on multiple sensory levels through a stream-of-consciousness interaction, the exhibition explores the boundaries and interrelations among people and their physical surroundings, and draws a connection between her new series of work and the moving-image piece Point Reflection (2023).

== Exhibitions & Awards ==
Solo shows include "Delicate Cycle" SculptureCenter, New York (2016), Food Rental High Line at the Rail Yards (2015); Wrong Happy Hour, JTT, NYC, New York (2014); Sunny in the Furnace the Kitchen, New York (2014); We Live With Animals Performa 13, New York (2013); Centripetal Run Chocolate Factory Theater, New York (2012); Clothes Line White Rainbow, London (2018); Past in a future tense Bortolami Gallery, New York (2019); and Aki Sasamoto’s Life Laboratory Museum of Contemporary Art Tokyo (2025).

Group exhibitions include: Collection Asian Landscapes, 21st Century Museum of Contemporary Art, Kanazawa, Japan (2018);Travelers: Stepping into the Unknown, NMAO's 40th Anniversary Exhibition, National Museum of Art, Osaka, Japan (2018); 11th Shanghai Biennale: Why Not Ask Again, Power Station of Art, Shanghai, China (2018); Visitors, Governor's Island, New York (2015); Parasophia: Kyoto International Festival of Contemporary Culture 2015, Japan (2015); Pier 54, High Line Art, New York (2014); Out Of Doubt: Roppongi Crossing 2013, Mori Art Museum, Tokyo (2013); A Spoken Word Exhibition, Galerie Nationale du Jeu de Paume, Paris (2013); Omnilogue: Journey to West, Lalit Kara Academy, New Delhi, India (2012); and Greater New York: 5 Year Review, MoMA PS1, New York (2010). Sasamoto’s work has been featured at biennials include the Gwangju Biennale, South Korea (2012), the Whitney Biennial, New York (2010), and Yokohama Triennial, Japan (2008)

Awards include: The Foundation for Contemporary Arts Grants to Artists award (2017); Grants for Overseas Study by Young Artists, the Pola Art Foundation (2013–2014); Oscar Williams and Gene Derwood Award, The New York Community Trust (2012); Program of Overseas Study for Upcoming Artists, Agency for Cultural Affairs, Japanese Government (2011–2012); Visual Art Grant Award, The Rema Hort Mann Foundation (2007); and Toby Fund Award (2007).
