= Skuja Braden =

- Latvian-American artist duo
- Melissa D. Braden and Ingūna Skuja
- Formation: 1999
- Fields: Sculpture Installation art Ceramic art / ceramics Site-specific art
- Official language: Latvian, English, Russian
- Artist: Ingūna Skuja
- Artist: Melissa D. Braden
- Website: www.skuja-braden.com

Skuja Braden is a Latvian-American artist duo established in 1999 by Latvian artist Ingūna Skuja (born 1965, Latvia) and American artist Melissa D. Braden (born 1968, California). Working primarily with porcelain and stoneware, they create handmade sculptures, vessels, installations, and site-specific works integrating painting and sculpture. Their practice challenges conventional distinctions between fine art and craft.

The artists describe their collaboration through the formula 1 + 1 = 3, in which two individuals generate a third artistic identity — Skuja Braden — through their shared practice. This philosophy was documented in their 2010 statement for the exhibition Karma Koma.

Their 2020 exhibition Samsāra at Riga's Museum of Decorative Arts and Design led to their selection as finalists for the 2021 Purvītis Prize. In 2022, Skuja Braden represented Latvia at the 59th Venice Biennale with Selling Water by the River. In 2026, they completed Above the Below and Sanctum of Flow, a permanent site-specific installation for the visitor centre of the Kistefos Museum in Norway.

== Career ==
Ingūna Skuja and Melissa D. Braden met at Humboldt State University in California in 1994. They established Skuja Braden in Riga in 1999, later spending seven years living and working in the United States before returning to Latvia in 2009.

Skuja Braden have held more than 50 solo exhibitions worldwide, including shows in New York, Milan, Istanbul, and Zagreb. Their work has been presented internationally in museums, biennials, and exhibitions spanning contemporary art, sculpture, painting, printmaking, and design. Their works are represented in public and private collections internationally.

In 2023, kaufmann repetto presented two simultaneous solo exhibitions: Pardon My Body in New York and Strange Bargain in Milan. In 2025, Skuja Braden were elected members of the International Academy of Ceramics.

== Artistic practice ==
=== Collaborative authorship: 1 + 1 = 3 ===
Since their first joint exhibition in 1999, the artists have signed their work with both surnames.

In a statement published for their 2010 exhibition Karma Koma at Māksla XO Gallery in Riga, the artists described Skuja Braden as a third artist emerging from their collaboration, with an artistic identity and mind of its own. They expressed this concept through the formula 1 + 1 = 3.

Their non-hierarchical approach extends throughout the creative process. Both artists contribute to the conception, construction, drawing, painting, and glazing of each work, modifying and responding to one another's contributions rather than maintaining fixed artistic roles.

=== Painting, sculpture, and material ===
For Skuja Braden, porcelain and stoneware are materials through which artistic ideas take form, rather than boundaries defining their work as craft. Painting and sculpture are equally important, interdependent disciplines, developed together throughout the creative process. Their practice challenges conventional hierarchies separating fine art from decorative and applied art.

Their handmade works combine sculptural form with painterly imagery, transforming familiar ceramic objects through humour, satire, and layered narratives. Drawing on domestic objects, popular culture, sexuality, politics, and spiritual symbolism, the artists use material and imagery to explore contemporary social and cultural questions.

=== Themes and imagery ===
Their work incorporates feminist perspectives, sexuality and the body, autobiography, Buddhist thought, and criticism of political and social conventions. Visual references range from Japanese erotic prints and religious iconography to cartoons and popular culture.

Dreams and everyday experiences are recurring sources of imagery. Individual works often contain multiple narratives and double meanings, revealed through their sculptural forms, painted surfaces, and titles.

=== Materials and media ===
Porcelain is Skuja Braden’s primary medium, but their creative process typically begins with drawing and extends across sculpture, painting, assemblage, printmaking and graphic art, photography, film, and video. Moving images are often integrated into larger ceramic installations. In Samsara (2020), Ilga’s Altar combined porcelain figures, fur, and video in a memorial installation dedicated to Ingūna Skuja’s mother; a version incorporating video was subsequently presented in the 2021 Purvītis Prize finalists exhibition at the Latvian National Museum of Art. Selling Water by the River (2022) also incorporated video, including footage of the artists burning their couch. Porcelain and stoneware therefore remain the artists’ principal material language while functioning as structures through which imagery, narrative, found objects, and moving images are brought together.

== Major works ==
=== Samsāra (2020) ===
Presented at Riga's Museum of Decorative Arts and Design from March to September 2020, Samsāra marked twenty-one years of collaboration and brought together more than 200 works arranged in eight thematic sections.

Drawing on the Buddhist concept of the cycle of birth, death, and rebirth, the exhibition explored mortality, memory, transformation, and personal relationships. It included painted porcelain portraits of public figures and acquaintances, as well as Ilga's Altar, a tribute to Ingūna Skuja's mother.

The exhibition received the Kilograms kultūras 2020 Visual Art award and led to the artists' selection as finalists for the 2021 Purvītis Prize.

=== Selling Water by the River (2022) ===
Skuja Braden represented Latvia at the 59th International Art Exhibition of La Biennale di Venezia with Selling Water by the River, curated by Andra Silapētere and Solvita Krese of the Latvian Centre for Contemporary Art.

Presented in the Arsenale, the installation recreated elements of the artists' home through more than 300 porcelain objects, combining new commissions with works produced over two decades. Domestic spaces became settings for exploring private and public life, post-socialist experience, personal histories, and Buddhist philosophy.

The project referenced Judy Chicago and Miriam Schapiro's Womanhouse (1972). Artnet News included the pavilion among its nine favourites of the Biennale, while ArtReview selected it among three notable pavilions in the Arsenale.

=== Above the Below / Sanctum of Flow (2026) ===
In June 2026, Skuja Braden completed Above the Below and Sanctum of Flow, a permanent site-specific installation commissioned for the restrooms of the Kistefos Museum's new visitor centre in Jevnaker, Norway.

Above the Below features a sculptural porcelain splash rising from a stoneware base above a marble sink structure, incorporating a mirror that brings visitors into the composition.

Sanctum of Flow extends the installation into the surrounding restroom spaces through thirteen oval ceramic compositions embedded in stall walls, with imagery referencing water, bodily functions, and architectural passages.

The project integrates painting and sculpture into the architecture and everyday functions of the building.

== Awards and honours ==
- 2026 – GCB Prize, International Competition, Gyeonggi Ceramic Biennale, South Korea, for Laced Vessel (2025)
- 2025 – Baltic Award, Art category, 1st Baltic Awards
- 2021 – Purvītis Prize, finalist, for Samsāra; Delfi People's Choice Award
- 2020 – Kilograms kultūras, Visual Art category, for Samsāra
- 2016 – Martinsons Award, Silver Prize, national category, 1st Latvia International Ceramics Biennale, Daugavpils
- 2016 – Förderpreis Keramik der Nassauischen Sparkasse, jury commendation for Flocked Vase and Harvest Vase, Keramikmuseum Westerwald, Germany
- 2016 – Honorary Citizens of Aizkraukle Municipality, Latvia
