= Anders Sveaas =

Norwegian businessperson and consulate

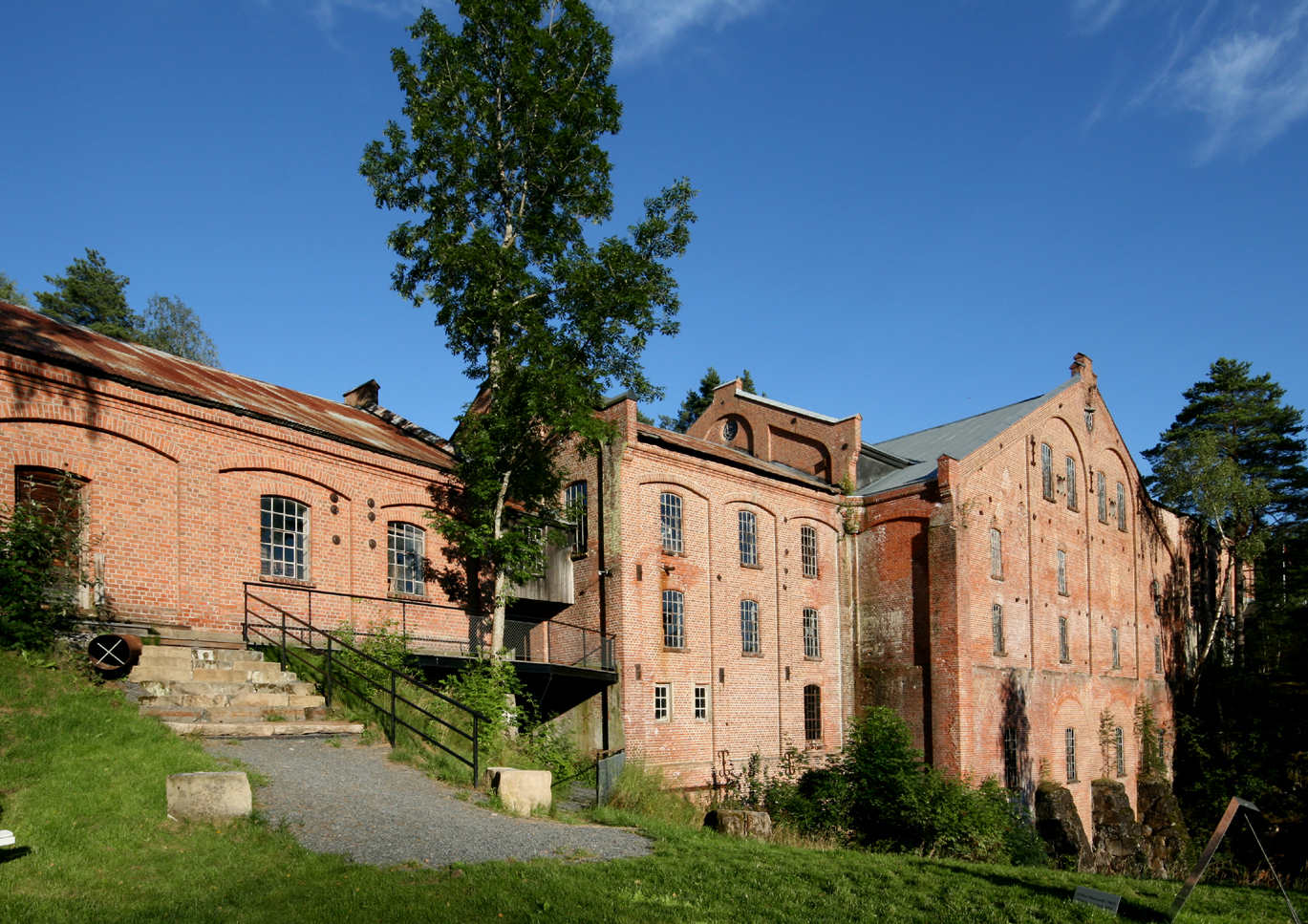
Kistefos Wood Pulp Mill Jevnaker, Norway

Anders Sveaas (November 27, 1840 – August 24, 1917) was a Norwegian businessperson and consulate. He was the founder of the Kistefos Wood Pulp Mill in Jevnaker, Norway.

== Biography ==
Anders Sveaas was born on November 27, 1840, on the Haug farm in Modum. Sveaas was involved in a number of foreign ventures before founding the Kistefos pulp mill (Kistefos Træsliberi) at Kistefossen on the Randselva near Jevnaker in Oppland, Norway. Kistefossen is located just below the end of the Randsfjord where the Randselva river forms a boundary between Jevnaker in Oppland and Ringerike in Buskerud. Sveaas had bought the Kistefossen waterfall the year before production at the pulp mill started in 1890.

The succession of this business venture, Kistefos is a private investment company wholly owned by his grandson Christen Sveaas. The former site of Kistefos Træsliberi is now the location of Kistefos-Museet which was established in 1996.
