= Robert Bordo =

Canadian-American painter

- Born: 1949 (age 76–77); Montreal, Canada
- Education: New York Studio School of Drawing, Painting and Sculpture, McGill University
- Known for: Painting
- Spouse: Donald Mouton
- Awards: Guggenheim Fellowship, Robert De Niro, Sr. Prize, American Academy of Arts and Letters, The Canada Council
- Website: Robert Bordo

Robert Bordo is a New York-based, Canadian-American artist known for paintings that blend modernist formal concerns with postmodern approaches to image, subject matter and metaphor. Throughout his career, he has worked in painting series positioned between representation and abstraction that critics characterize as conceptually structured, yet sensual in execution. These series explore recurring, often overlapping themes, such as memory and experience, the passage of time, landscape and weather phenomena, mapping, and mark-making as an indicator of thought. New York Times critic Roberta Smith described Bordo's early map paintings as charting an idiosyncratic "hybrid discipline … a kind of cartographically conscious rerouting of modernism"; in a 2019 New Yorker review of his "crackup" paintings, Andrea Scott wrote, "Bordo's imagery is an apt metaphor for our current, contentious political climate, but his true subject is painting itself: how easily it can tip realism into abstraction or shift figure-ground relations until it's impossible to discern whether you’re on the inside looking out or vice versa."

Bordo's work belongs to several public art collections, including the Metropolitan Museum of Art, San Francisco Museum of Modern Art, and Hammer Museum. In 2007, he was awarded a Guggenheim Fellowship. He has also received a Robert De Niro, Sr. Prize and awards from the American Academy of Arts and Letters, and Canada Council, among other recognition.

== Education and early career ==
Bordo was born in Montreal, Canada in 1949. He attended McGill University in Montreal from 1967 to 1970. He was dissatisfied at the time with the dominance of hard-edge abstraction in Montreal, and left to take up studies at the New York Studio School of Drawing, Painting and Sculpture with Philip Guston and Mercedes Matter, among others, from 1972 to 1974.

In 1977, Bordo moved into a loft in Hoboken, New Jersey that he shared with choreographer Mark Morris. He collaborated with Morris on several dance productions between 1983 and 1995, creating set designs, costumes and posters for works staged at Lincoln Center, Brooklyn Academy of Music and Dance Theatre Workshop, among other venues. These works included The Death of Socrates (1983), the danced Purcell opera Dido and Aeneas (1989–2012), Stabat Mater (1986), and Paukenschlag (1993). Dance critic Joan Acocella wrote that Bordo's "brooding" backdrop for Dido and Aeneas (derived from his abstracted map paintings of the time) "read [not] as fact, but as idea—a projection, of Aeneas’s [tragic] duty" and the vastness of the world and history compared to the individual.

During the first decade of his art career, Bordo exhibited in solo shows at the New York Studio School and Concordia University (Montreal), group shows at the Jersey City Museum, Drawing Center and Tampa Museum of Art, and in collaborative projects with poet William Allen and the conceptual collective Group Material. His first major solo exhibitions were held at Brooke Alexander Gallery in New York (1987–1992) and Mira Godard Gallery in Toronto (1991). In 1995, he joined the faculty at the Cooper Union School of Art in New York, heading its painting program from 1996 to 2017. He became a faculty member of Bard College's MFA painting program in 2010. Bordo maintained studios in both the Hudson Valley in upstate New York and Brooklyn in the first two decades of the 2000s and now works from Kinderhook, New York.

== Artwork and reception ==
Robert Bordo, Coast (Columbus), 1987, oil and dry pigment on linen, 32" x 48", Metropolitan Museum of Art Collection

Bordo's painting series are intuitive in their development, often originating from ruminations on banal images, objects or clichés, which give way to explorations of the space, vocabulary and material practice of painting.

Critics David Cohen and Stephen Maine have related Bordo's art to an American tradition of stylized abstraction from nature that includes Alex Katz and Milton Avery, while also linking him to critically self-aware contemporary painters such as Raoul De Keyser, Thomas Nozkowski, and Merlin James. Cohen distinguishes Bordo from both groups in his greater focus on "painterly experience" and the physical qualities of color, substance and application.

Bordo's earlier series were noted for lyrical qualities recalling Cézanne and the color-field painters Clyfford Still and Agnes Martin; his later series feature a blunter, more anxious sensibility that writers compare to the late work of Philip Guston.

=== Early series (1988–1998) ===
In his early work, Bordo sought to integrate an abstract painting language with subject matter and metaphors related to landscape, social narratives, modernism, and his personal history as a Canadian and Montrealer living in New York. He initially painted globes, before turning to two-dimensional landforms and graphic elements, most prominently in his "Map Paintings." His approach to imagery and form—as well as his suggestive titles—kept this work open to a range of political, historical and physical interpretations. Stephen Westfall described them as "homeless paintings" of drift and restlessness, of area but not place, grounded by concrete qualities of texture, surface and intimate scale. Other writers identified metaphors involving emigration, journey, change and loss, or—citing their military, economic and geographic references—contemporary geopolitical commentary (e.g., Hidden Agenda, Thaw).

Bordo exhibited map paintings in six solo exhibitions between 1987 and 1996. In these modestly scaled, quasi-minimal canvasses, he rendered the abstract shapes and irregular contours of landmasses from globes in glazes and textured fragments of color, which hovered between topographical suggestions of land, water or sky and abstraction, augmented by camouflage patterns, frames and elements from airmail envelopes, barely visible ledgers and stenciled aircraft forms (e.g., Exile, Letter). Roberta Smith likened these works to "the infinite spaces" of Edward Ruscha and Vija Celmins and the fictional stamp paintings of Donald Evans.

Bordo's 1990s work also included his "Speech Bubble" and "Denim" paintings. The former works employ ghostly, hand-painted, empty speech bubbles set against monochrome white or gun-metal gray backgrounds—an iconic reference to speechlessness during the height of the AIDS crisis. The "Denim" works employ stenciled bootprints on blue monochromes and consider themes involving mapping, walking, cruising, and queering of the field of painting.

Robert Bordo, Back Seat, 2003, oil on linen, 21" x 35"

=== Postcard paintings and landscape abstractions ===
Bordo began exploring motifs involving abstracted landscape, the presentation of sublime space, and human archiving and recall of image memories in the late 1990s. In solo shows at Alexander and Bonin (1999 and 2002), he exhibited wide-format paintings featuring small, rectangular landscape abstractions derived from picture postcards his mother had collected. He rendered the images in quiet, carefully limited palettes and a no-frills manner without descriptive detail, then overlapped them in loose grids or clustered constellations over unmodulated, matte grounds (e.g., Lookout, 1999; Back Seat, 2003). Reviews compared the paintings to work by Robert Ryman or the "foggy infinitude of Agnes Martin and Mark Rothko." New York Times critic Grace Glueck termed them reticent "mindscapes"—generalized impressions of landscape that others equated to links in the associative chain of private thought and emotions, elusively suggesting the possibility of resolution into coherent subjects or sites.

With exhibitions at Alexander and Bonin, Rubicon Gallery (Dublin) and Mummery + Schnelle (London) between 2005 and 2009, Bordo departed from multi-image postcard works, producing some of his most, understated, abstract paintings. In simple, frontal works, he distilled a sense of light, space and place into a minimum of color and surface incident—brushy, wet-into-wet stretches of mint, blue or taupe overlaid with dots, daubs, tiny brushstrokes, or slabs—pushing the limits of suggestive representation (e.g., Another Day, 2005). Art in America's Stephen Maine wrote that the "muted colors and veiled imagery" evoked an understated theatrical quality of intrigue that prompted viewers "to hang on every painterly syllable … drawn into what seems like an artworld subplot." Later paintings such as Heatwave and Green Girl (both 2008) consisted simply of free, seemingly casual, lyrical brushstrokes, applied in blended colors over a monochrome ground. Reviews of both shows noted the work's strong connection with nature, in palette and atmospherics, despite the high degree of abstraction.

=== Later series: windshield, rear-view mirror and "crackup" paintings ===
Robert Bordo, Rear-view, 2011, oil on canvas, 24" x 36"

Bordo's paintings in the 2010s displayed a new sense of anxiety, reflecting issues such as the dramatic political polarization in the U.S. and climate change. Artforum's Barry Schwabsky wrote that these paintings left behind the more delicate, lyrical touch of the landscape works, "evince[ing] a Gustonesque brusqueness and spleen… with a blunter, more robust facture and a more implacable presence." This somewhat larger work was more explicitly structured by its imagery—often car windshields and rear-view mirrors, which served as metaphors for consciousness and movement in space and time, forward and backward (e.g., Rear-view, 2011; Wacko, 2012). In the "Windshield" paintings, Bordo continued to engage characteristic interests in visual and tactile pleasure, flatness and depth, conflating the picture plane with the windscreens of cars often depicted driving through unpredictable, rainy weather with active wipers (e.g., Dial, The Future, both 2012). These paintings typically employed a complex sense of space, with overlaps, splits, doublings, changes of scale, and expressive horizontal and vertical lines suggesting journeys anticipated or recalled. Roberta Smith wrote that the thick, wet-on-wet paint handling, blurred transparencies and fractured spaces of broken center lines and red lights created "an effect that is deliciously and darkly comic, but also abstract and rather ham-handedly beautiful."

Robert Bordo, c.u.c.d. #14, 2019, oil on canvas, 75" x 56"

In the latter half of the 2010s, Bordo developed several offshoots from the windshield paintings. He exhibited loosely painted, abstracted heads rendered with thick, squeegeed paint in "Greater New York" (MoMA PS1, 2015)—closeups of his own worried face, blurred and moving, in eyeglasses and sometimes smoking a cigar—that emerge from rearview mirrors, box forms or rough grids. His "Skinny Jeans" paintings (2016) developed out of the self-portraits, as he simultaneously saw the eyeglasses in them as back pockets on jeans. He created the paintings by scraping outlined forms out of dark monochrome surfaces with a palette knife, revealing lines of bright underpainting. Writers described them as both humorous and homoerotic examinations of looking and being looked at, desire and mortality, that refer back to the queer abstraction of his "Denim" paintings.

In 2019 at Bortolami, Bordo exhibited his "crackup" paintings, which drew upon prior series by employing monochrome grounds and lines incised into wet, oil surfaces that appeared like broken window panes. They depict dark holes on their surfaces, surrounded by spidery cracks that seemingly threaten to shatter further. The show included nine canvases in moody greens and blues, ranging from imposing (seven feet tall) to intimate (twenty inches), that reflected a contemporary, contentious political climate.

== Awards and collections ==
Bordo has been recognized with a Guggenheim Fellowship (2007), Robert De Niro Sr. Painting Prize (2014), and awards from the American Academy of Arts and Letters (2012), New York Foundation for the Arts (2012), Ballinglen Foundation (2010), Tesuque Foundation (1998), MacDowell (1994), and Canada Council (1991, 1977).

Bordo's work belongs to the public collections of the Metropolitan Museum of Art, San Francisco Museum of Modern Art, Albright-Knox Art Gallery, Blanton Museum of Art, Birmingham Museum of Art, Colby College Museum of Art Alex Katz Collection, Hammer Museum, High Museum of Art, Jersey City Museum, Mississippi Museum of Art, Norton Museum of Art, Sheldon Museum of Art, and Weatherspoon Art Museum, among others.
