= Kistefos Wood Pulp Mill =

Former pulp mill and hydroelectric power plant in Jevnaker, Norway

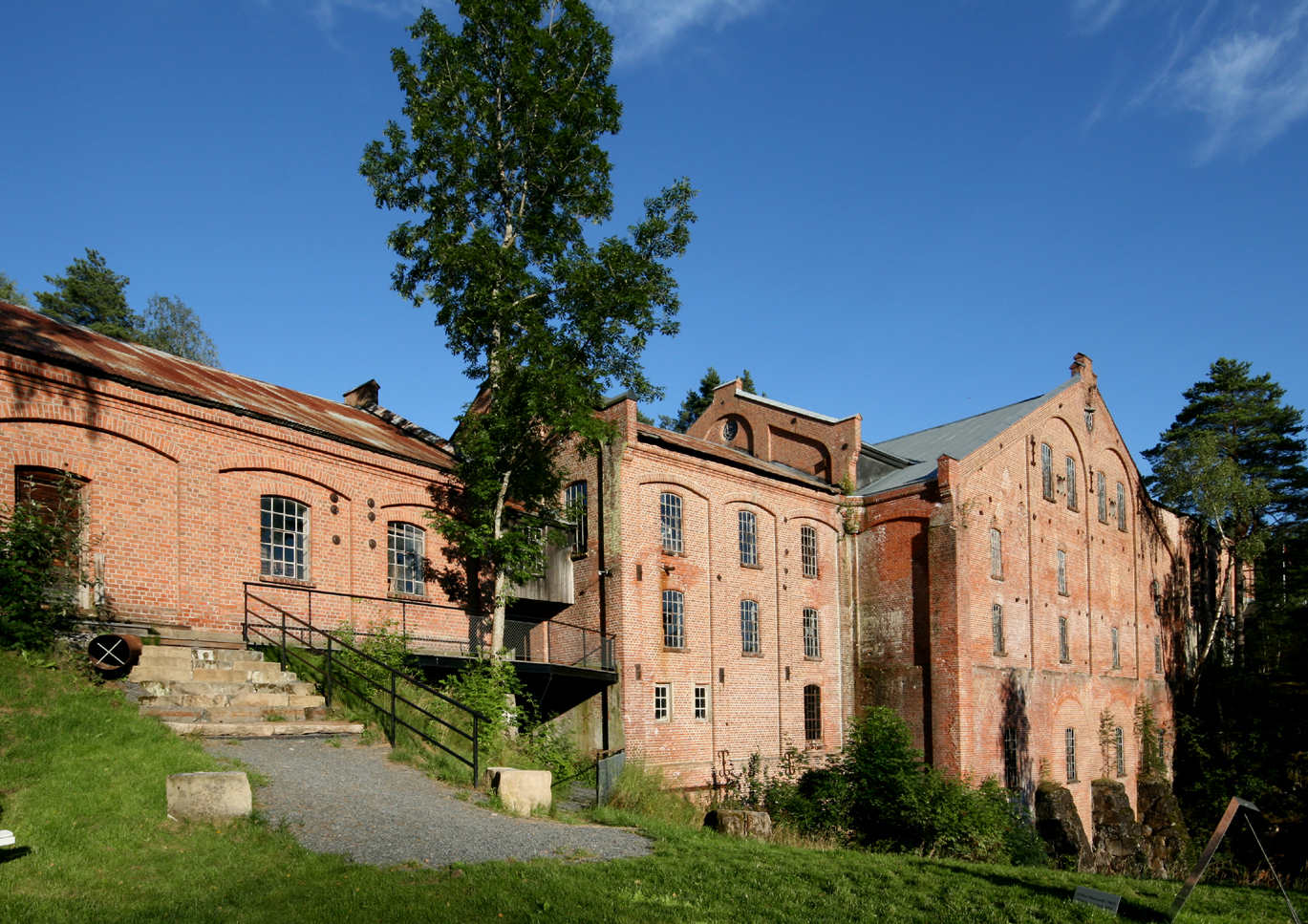
Kistefos pulp mill

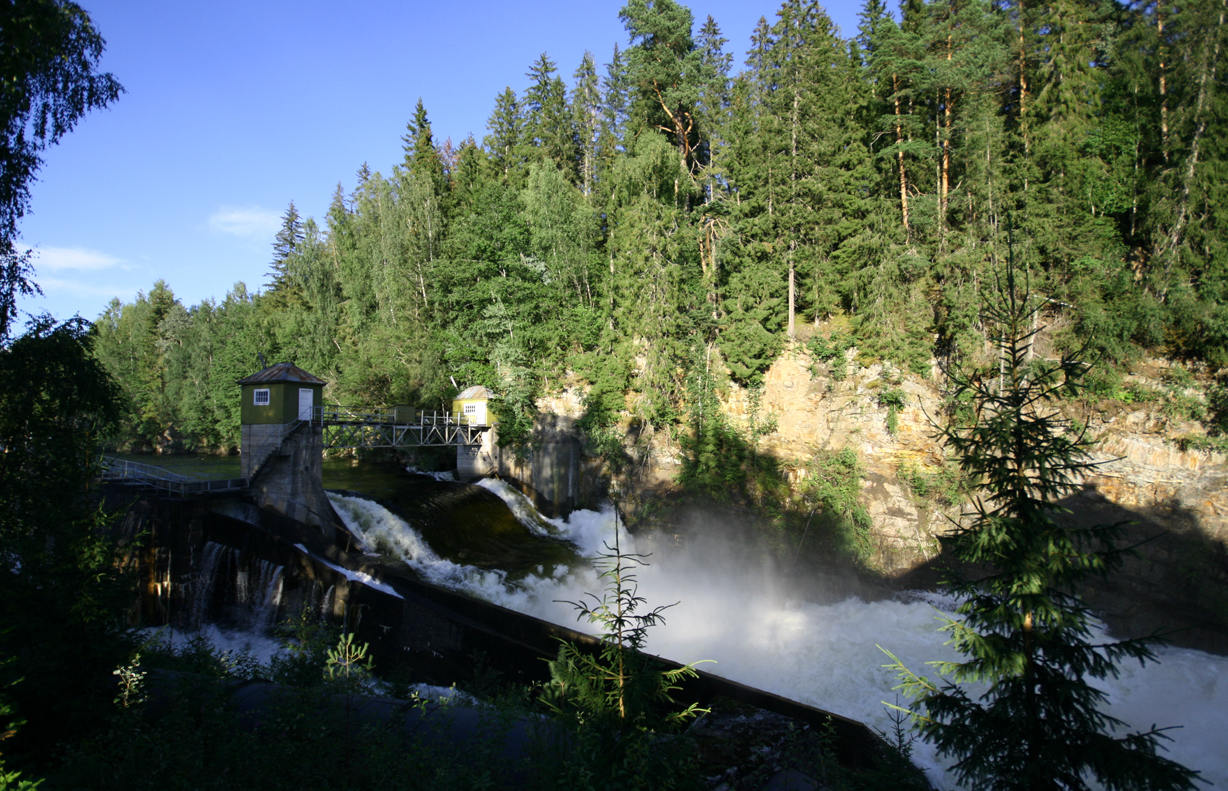
Kistefos in the river Randelva

The Kistefos Wood Pulp Mill (Norwegian: Kistefos Træsliberi) is a former pulp mill and hydroelectric power plant in Jevnaker, Norway. It was founded by Kistefos at the river Randselva in 1889.

== History ==
The mill was founded on 27 June 1889 by councilor Anders Sveaas and was in operation from the following year until 1955 when an agreement was made with Follum Fabrikker (now Norske Skog Follum) who took over the operation. Kistefos agreed to deliver power and lumber to the plant at Follum, being paid market price and a premium for the processing. After an internal disagreement in the family the company was sold to the neighbor company Viul Tresliperi in 1983, but was bought back by Christen Sveaas in 1993 and transformed into the holding company Kistefos.

== Operation ==
At the plant pulp was created by hydraulic pressure transferred from turbines. Kistefos was early with electricity, and both the factory and the housing was supplied with it. The power came directly from the water fall and was transformed mechanically. After the closing of the factory the fall was converted to a hydroelectric power plant. The lumber came mill owned forests in Land, pulled across Randsfjorden and floated down Randselva to Kistefoss.

== Museum ==
In 1991, the power plant was sold to the municipal power company Viul Kraft. In 1995, 85% of the company was sold to Christen Sveaas, the grandson of Anders Sveaas, with the objective to create an industrial museum and a contemporary sculpture park. The museum opened in 1996 as the Kistefos Museet and underwent major renovation works in the following years, thanks to donations by the Jevnaker municipality and by Sveaas. In September 2015, the museum unveiled an expansion project designed by the architectural firm Bjarke Ingels Group. The mill was added to the list of priority technical and industrial cultural heritage by the Norwegian Directorate for Cultural Heritage.
