= Simone Gilges =

German contemporary artist (1973–2023)

Simone Gilges (1973 – 11 August 2023) was a German contemporary artist and a founding member of the Honey-Suckle Company. She was also the publisher of "Freier", a magazine focused on mental health. She lived and worked in Berlin.

== Biography ==
Simone Gilges was born in Bonn, West Germany in 1973. She studied Visual Communication at UdK Berlin University of the Arts, as well as Photography/Design at FH Dortmund. Her solo work has been exhibited widely internationally, including Galerie Giti Nourbakhsch, Berlin; Foxy Production, New York; Schirn Kunsthalle, Frankfurt; CAPC, Bordeaux; CRAC Alsace, France; pret a pARTager, Dakar, Senegal a.o.; Screen and Decor, Canada; Chelsea Art Museum, New York; Studio Voltaire, London; The John Institute, Zurich; Künstlerhaus Stuttgart; 4th Berlin Biennale, Gagosian Gallery, Hinterconti, Hamburg. Honey Suckle Company has been exhibited at Frankfurter Kunstverein; Kunstverein Harburger Bahnhof, Hamburg; Kunsthalle Basel; Cubitt Gallery, London; Künstlerhaus Stuttgart; Sónar Festival, Barcelona; P.S.1 Contemporary Art Center, New York; Berlin Biennale 1.

Gilges died on 11 August 2023, at the age of 50.
