= Marianne Heske =

Norwegian visual artist (born 1946)

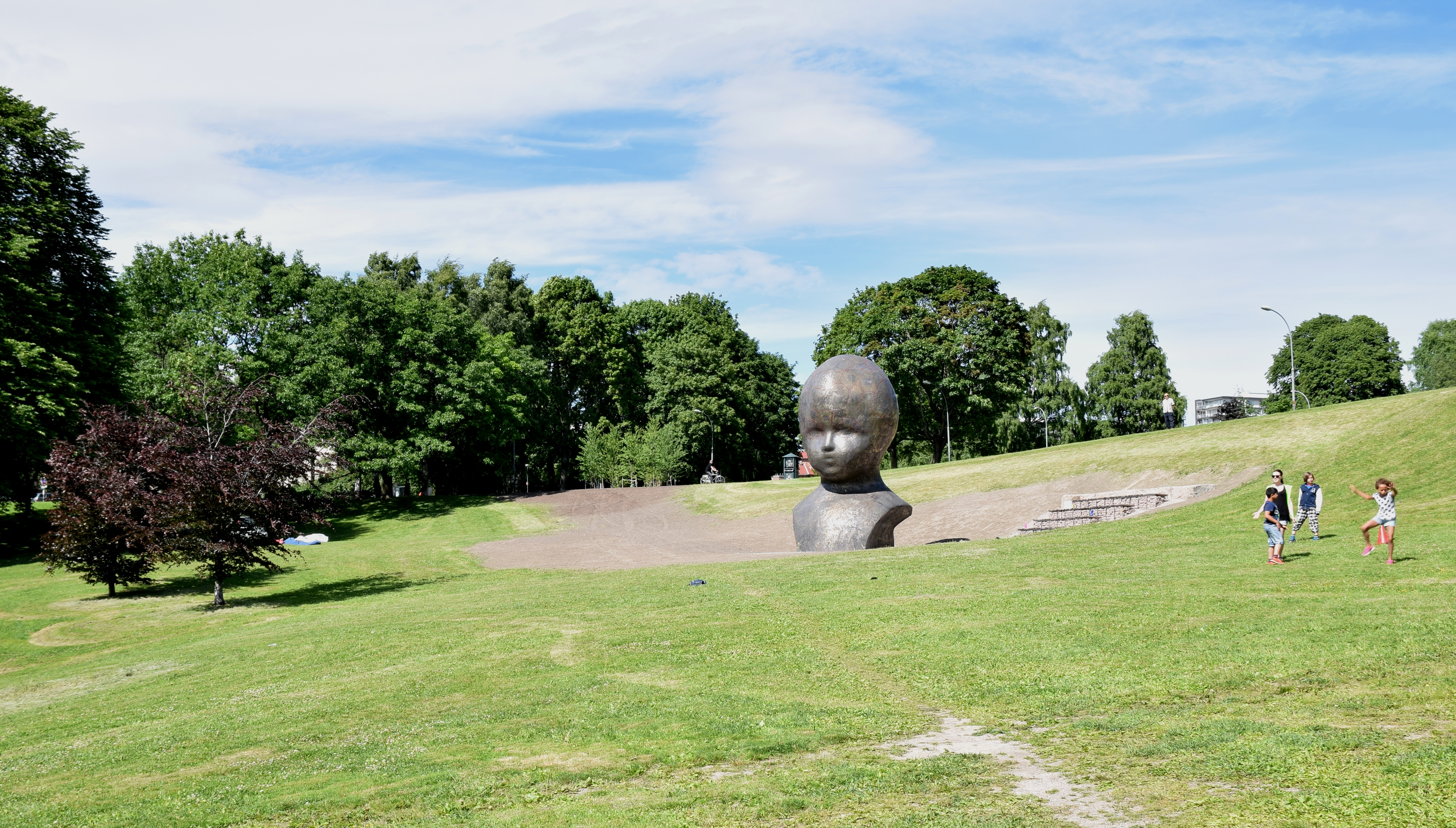
- Born: 21 February 1946 (age 80); Ålesund
- Notable work: Istårn

Marianne Heske (born 21 February 1946) is a Norwegian visual artist.

== Personal life ==
Heske was born in Ålesund on 21 February 1946, a daughter of Frithjof Nordstrøm Heske and Sara Margrethe Sønneland. She grew up partly in Ålesund and partly in Tafjord; her father was director of the energy company Tafjord Kraft.

== Career ==
Heske is particularly known for her videomanipulated landscapes, and for her installations. Among her works is Istårn from 1992, for the 1994 Winter Olympics. She is represented in various galleries, including the National Gallery of Norway, Henie-Onstad Art Centre, Bonnefanten Museum, Bibliothèque nationale de France, and the National Museum of Contemporary Art in Seoul. Her installation work Gjerdeløa (1980) is included in the Tangen collection at Kunstsilo in Kristiansand.
