= Violet Hopkins =

American painter

Violet Hopkins is an American painter. She holds a BFA from the University of Texas at Austin, and an MFA from the California Institute of the Arts, Valencia. Hopkins work often draws inspiration from found images of the natural and scientific world, using ink, pencil and paint to transform them into color-rich, dynamic scenes that incorporate both abstract and figurative elements.

Amra Brooks, in Artforum called her 2006 "Chromatophoric" exhibition at David Kordansky Gallery, "magical."

An exhibition in New York 2009 was based around the 1977 Voyager space program. Time Out concluded that "Violet Hopkins's latest paintings won't blow your mind... [but] her project acknowledges art's challenge to interact with a vast, ever-changing world."

Several of Hopkins' works reside in the permanent collection of the Museum of Modern Art in New York.
