= Malmö Art Academy =

Art school of Lund University

Coordinates: 55.60108°N 13.02412°E

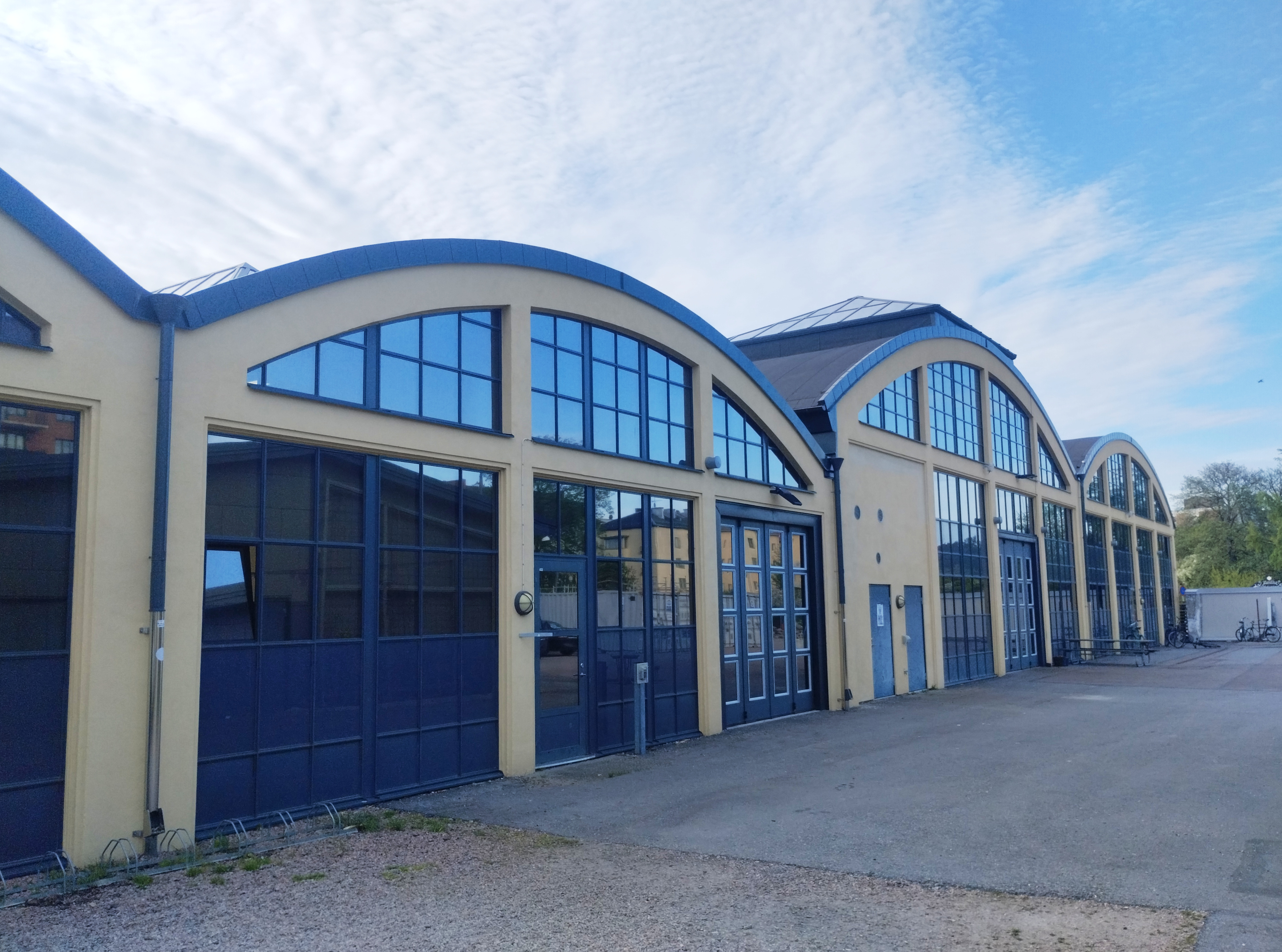
Båghallarna

Malmö Art Academy is an art school as part of Lund University in Lund, Sweden. The academy was founded in 1995, and has nurtured numerous talents, including Swedish artist Nathalie Djurberg. The academy has been an integral part of the art culture in Sweden and internationally, hosting artists and speakers.

The academy was housed in the same premises for two decades: the Mellersta Förstadsskolan building, originally built in 1898. However, in 2017, the municipal government of Malmö gave Lund University a year's notice to vacate the premises, citing an urgent need for the space to be converted into a municipal public school. This eviction notice sparked concerns about the future of the academy, with fears of possible closure due to a lack of an interim solution.

There were plans in the works to develop a campus that would unite Lund University's music, theater, and art academies with its interdisciplinary arts center. However, this project was not slated for completion until 2020, leaving a gap of three years from the eviction deadline. In response to the concerns, Solfrid Söderlind, the dean of the faculty of fine and performing arts at Lund University, assured that the university had no intention of closing the academy, and the city of Malmö had expressed interest in finding a solution before the academy was required to move out.

Following its move to its present location in Båghallarna on Föraregatan in Malmö (with additional facilities on Bergsgatan), the Malmö Art Academy remains open, and continues to host its Annual Exhibition. This event is a significant occasion heralding spring, when the academy opens its doors to the public for ten days. During this period, students present their latest works, film screenings, and performances in Båghallarna. The exhibition showcases the students' commitment, curiosity, and experimentation across different media and formats.
