= Ivan Morley =

American artist

Ivan Morley (born 1966 in Burbank, California) is an American painter. His paintings often feature subject matter from small towns in California. His paintings incorporate a variety of other materials, including fabric, wax, varnish, and thread.
