= Ida Lorentzen =

American born, Norwegian artist (born 1951)

Ida Margrethe Lorentzen (born December 11, 1951, in New York City ) is an American born, Norwegian artist known for her paintings of interiors of a melancholic nature.

== Biography ==
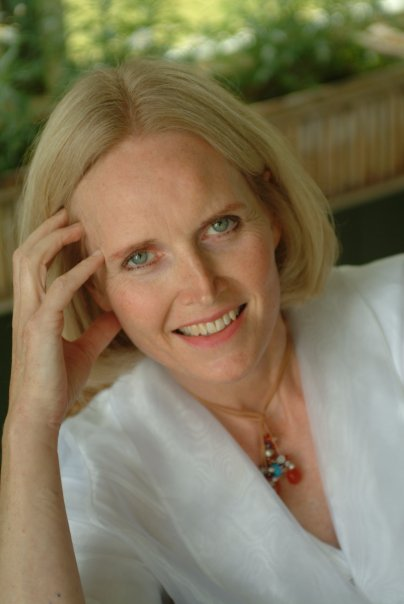
Ida Lorentzen

Ida Lorentzen was raised and educated in New England and Oslo. She studied at Boston University’s School of Fine Arts (1970–1974) and the Norwegian National Academy of Fine Arts in Oslo (1974–1979). She was awarded the Hassam, Speicher, Betts, and Symons Purchase Fund from the American Academy of Arts and Letters in 1995 for her Room With a View, (1993). She married Erik Nilsen-Moe in 1974.

Ida Lorentzen has painted several portrait commissions, Queen Sonja of Norway (1994) and the Coronation Ceremony in the Nidaros Cathedral in 1991. Master dissertations are on file at Oslo University, Bergen University and Tromsø University.

== Family ==
Her father Oivind Lorentzen Jr. was chairman and president of Flagship Cruises, Ina., which operated the cruise ship Sea Venture. Her maternal grandfather was Brigadier General LaPrade, and her paternal grandfather, a former member of the Chemical Bank international who served during World War II as director of Norwegian shipping, in charge of the Free Norwegian Merchant Marine. Her husband was the son of Norwegian industrialist Halfdan Nilsen‐Moe, and her aunt-in-law Ingrid Smestad (née Nilsen-Moe), was married to Carl Smestad, scion of the Smestad family.

== Work ==
Her work is mainly centered around pastels and paintings of interior space, often hinting at a melancholic and sentimental mood. Her work is highly realistic, and implements strong use of light, shadow and composition to portray an interior space. Lorentzen says this about her own work: "When I have to say something about my paintings, I always think back to my student days and quote Philip Guston, who was then teaching at Boston University College of Fine Art: We are image-makers, and image-ridden, after many years I see how my own images do follow me.".
