= Caitlin Keogh =

American painter

Caitlin Keogh (born 1982) is an American painter, born in Alaska. Keogh's first solo show at Bortolami Gallery in New York City was in 2016. In 2020 Keogh began a painting cycle entitled Waxing Year which was completed in 2021.

Her work is included in the collections of the Whitney Museum of American Art and the Institute of Contemporary Art, Boston.

She has been represented by Bortolami Gallery in New York City and Overduin & Co in Los Angeles.
