= Gina Beavers =

American artist (born 1974)

- Born: 1974 (age 51–52); Athens, Greece
- Education: University of Virginia, School of the Art Institute of Chicago, Brooklyn College
- Known for: Painting, drawing
- Website: Gina Beavers

Gina Beavers, Applebees!, acrylic on canvas, 20" x 16" x 3", 2012.

Gina Beavers (born 1974) is an American artist based in the New York area. She first gained attention in the early 2010s for thickly painted, relief-like acrylic images of food, cosmetics techniques and bodybuilders appropriated from Instagram snapshots and selfies found using hashtags such as #foodporn, #sixpack and #makeuptutorial. Her later work has continued to recombine these recurrent subjects, as well as explore memes, irreverent conflations of genres or art history and kitsch, identity, fandom and celebrity-worship. In 2019, New York Times critic Martha Schwendener described her paintings as "canny statements on contemporary bodies, beauty and culture … [that] tackle the weirdness of immaterial images floating through the ether, building them up into something monumental, rather than dismissing them."

Beavers has exhibited at institutions including MoMA PS1, the Frans Hals Museum (Netherlands), Nassau County Museum of Art and KMAC Contemporary Art Museum. Her work belongs to the public collections of the Whitney Museum, Museum of Contemporary Art, Los Angeles, and Institute of Contemporary Art, Miami, among others. She lives and works in Orange, New Jersey.

== Early life and career ==
Beavers was born in 1974 in Athens, Greece into a diplomatic family and grew up moving between Europe and the US. She attended the University of Virginia and received a BA in studio art and anthropology in 1996. She initially painted in a cartoonish, narrative vein, but turned to hard-edge abstraction in graduate school at the School of the Art Institute of Chicago, where she earned an MFA in painting and drawing in 2000. After moving to New York City, she got an MS in art education from Brooklyn College in 2005 and taught art at a Brooklyn K–8 school for twelve years until 2015.

By 2010, Beavers had begun experimenting with ways to incorporate a sculpted, handmade element into her work and turned to the internet and social media as sources of imagery. This new work brought her early critical attention through group shows in and around New York City and solo exhibitions at James Fuentes Gallery and Clifton Benevento in New York, among others. Her inclusion in the 2015 MoMA PS1 "Greater New York" show increased this level of public recognition.

In subsequent years, Beavers has had solo exhibitions at Michael Benevento Gallery (Los Angeles), GNYP Gallery (Berlin), Carl Kostyál Gallery (London and Stockholm), MoMA PS1 (the 2019 survey, "The Life I Deserve") and Marianne Boesky Gallery (New York), Various Small Fires (Seoul), and Neuer Essener Kunstverein (Germany). She has also appeared in group exhibitions at the FLAG Art Foundation, Gavin Brown's Enterprise and Frans Hals Museum, among others.

== Work and reception ==
Beavers's work is frequently regarded as being two-fold in nature: concerned both with fetish-like social media preoccupations involving the body and identity and with painting itself as a subject—its cultural status, unique qualities and limitations.

Gina Beavers, Doll Lips, acrylic on linen on panel, 48" x 48" x 9", 2021.

Beavers bases her paintings on snapshots from social media subgenres that embody contemporary modes of consumption and desire defined by excess and differentiation: "food porn," makeup tutorials, body painting and bodybuilder selfies. Critics have likened her position toward this subject matter (and her own output) as that "of a disinterested anthropologist" situated between fascination and critique. Her work engages the power of "high" and "low" cultural images and their effects on selfhood, offering uncanny or unsettling visions of digitally mediated life marked by a mix of shamelessness and self-abasement. She often blurs categories and genres in mashups of art history, kitsch and the body, for example, the painting Starry Night by Vincent van Gogh as rendered in Bacon (2016), grotesque image combinations (burgers and vaginas, cake and butt cheek), or pats of paint on a palette formed into cupcakes. Frieze's Jonathan Griffin observed, "In Beavers’s paintings, the body is often conflated with the artwork, soliciting the gaze of others but also anxious to control it or deflect it through illusion."

Beavers re-endows ephemeral digital images with sculptural heft and tactility built by piling dense accumulations of acrylic paint and medium, foam and other materials. Critics connect this emphasis on materiality and the body to painterly, carnal traditions of oil painting extending back to artists such as Goya and Titian, as well as to more unruly, embodied aspects of Pop art. They suggest that her translations of digital imagery subject them to the logic of painting, introducing notions of singularity and temporality while divesting them of inherent qualities such as similarity, ubiquity and reproducibility.

The discrepancy between Beavers's bulging, rough matte forms and their often-slick screen-based sources highlights the gap between digital exemplars and messier, physical lives. Furthermore, her paintings often undermine the original intent of snapshots to be appetizing, appealing or sexy, rendering them as "repulsive and alluring," and "enticing and abject" according to reviewers. In a similar way, Beaver's painting technique calls into question (mostly male) painting traditions, even as it invokes them. She uses acrylic paint—associated with modern flatness and matte texture as opposed to oil's richness— and paints in an intentionally clumsy manner with thick, relief-like protrusions that rejects both mastery and illusionistic depth.

=== Early solo exhibitions ===
The expressive, impasto acrylic paintings in Beavers's first two solo exhibitions in 2012 were grounded in awkward, social-media photographs involving bodybuilding and body painting, with titles frequently derived from captions or comments that originally accompanied them. She recreated them as jarring, close-up reliefs of grotesquely muscled male torsos, bulging female breasts and bodies covered with images of animals or art-historical motifs (Gator or Mondrian, both 2012) that Andrew Russeth characterized as "meaty paintings with pleasantly creepy volume."

In her exhibition of the same year, "Palate" (the title a homophone for "palette"), she turned to small, low-relief works based on online food photography. The depictions ranging from marbled meat, oysters and shellfish to less exalted offerings (e.g., Food Porn! (Chicken & Waffles) and Applebees!, 2012) and employed unorthodox materials (pumice stone, glass beads) to better capture the textures of foods like pie crust or dipping sauce. New York Times critic Roberta Smith wrote that Beavers "exaggerated and satirized both the act of painting and the fetishization of food by professional photographers and hungry diners … captur[ing] certain extremes of indulgence that verge on gross." She and others connected the paintings (e.g., Red Velvet Cake) back to the messy sensuality of earlier work, such as Carolee Schneemann's Meat Joy (1964), Claes Oldenburg's anthropomorphic Store (1961), Red Grooms's painted sculptures and Photorealism.

Gina Beavers, American Flag Sponge Butt Cake, acrylic on linen on panel, 48" x 48" x 4", 2020.

Beavers returned to the body in the exhibitions "Re-Animator" (2014) and "Popography" (2015) with mostly square, often gridded paintings that matched typical formats of Instagram. In subject matter, they focused on cosmetics how-tos for "sun-kissed lips" and "smoky eye" (Maquillaje (Make-up), 2015) or straight-on, tightly cropped facial features (Who Has Braces, 2014). Los Angeles Times critic Sharon Mizota suggested that the thickly built, sticky accretions undid the gloss and sense of effortless glamour of their digital sources, operating "somewhere between critique and affection" and aesthetic and didactic objects to "cinematic and thoroughly surreal" effect. Artforum described them as "less pictorial than topographic" nature morte objects that positioned "paint's materiality as a metonym for that of the body's, making the latter seem cadaverous by comparison," as in Crotch Shots from the Getty Villa (2014), a five-part grid of Greco-Roman genitalia snapped from museum statuary.

=== Later work ===
In later shows, Beavers has introduced new subjects alongside recurrent ones. The exhibition "Ambitchous" (2017) juxtaposed makeup tutorial images with carnivalesque instructions for dressing up as cartoon characters such as Cruella de Vil and Elsa from the film Frozen (2013); reviews noted in the work and show's portmanteau title a contemporary attitude positioned ambiguously between female self-affirmation and ruthlessness. In "Tennis Ball Yellow" (2017), Beavers presented large-scale relief paintings of papier-mâché-formed paintboxes and sports balls that popped out from light-pink canvases lined like sports fields and pouting grass-green lips (Lip Balls, 2017). The show also included four-sided square paintings on plinth-like cubes that offered multiple viewing angles of their protruding forms.

In subsequent shows, such as "World War Me" (2020), Beavers examined identity and the ubiquitous presence of the female face and body in art and advertising through the lens of a fractured social-media self-consciousness craving recognition and popularity. Her boldly painted reliefs depicted enlarged, often repeating features (lips, hands, fake nails), faces and torsos in bikini underwear flaunting art-historical (Van Gogh, Picasso, Mondrian and others) and consumer culture motifs. Roberta Smith wrote, "These works conflate all kinds of self-improvement and adornment projects: makeup, tattoos, cosmetic surgery and nail art as well as fandom and celebrity-worship. Their blaring billboard power from afar is countered by a squirm-worthy intimacy up close."

For the Seoul exhibition, "Passionaries" (2021), Beavers infused typical subjects with local flavor in Korean Fried Chicken and several Parasite-themed works that referenced the 2019 film by Korean director Bong Joon-ho. She presented "Pastel Looks" in 2022, a show of flat pastel drawings that reviewers noted still managed to convey her characteristic sense of depth. The drawings focused on grids of lipstick tutorials and nail and food images, such as the humorous Hot Dog Nails Drawing (2022), which portrayed a hand with hot dog-decorated fingernails.

Beavers received the 2026 Creative Capital Award in Visual Arts to develop Comfortcore Sculptural Paintings, a series of three-dimensional works made with epoxies, resins, and foam coats that reimagine screenshots of household and consumer goods advertised on social media and shopping websites as a reference to the role retail therapy plays in the online experience.

== Collections ==
Beavers' work belongs to the public collections of the Institute of Contemporary Art Miami, Kistefos Museum and Sculpture Park (Norway), Museum of Contemporary Art, Los Angeles, Perez Art Museum Miami, Tel Aviv Museum of Art, and Whitney Museum.
