= Ola Kolehmainen =

Finnish photographer

Ola Kolehmainen (born 1964) is a Finnish photographer.

== Life and work ==
Born 1964 in Helsinki, Ola Kolehmainen graduated with a masters in photography at the Helsinki University of Art and Design in 1999. He studies and works in Berlin, Germany.

His work is concentrated on contemporary architecture, using interiors and buildings to create abstract compositions, with an interplay of light and reflection.

== Solo exhibitions ==
2012

- Enlightenment, Alvar Aalto Museum, Jyväskylä, Finland
- Gallerie Brandstrup, Oslo, Norway

2010

- Alvar Aalto, Galeria Senda, Barcelona, Spain
- A Building Is Not a Building, KUNTSI, Museum of Modern Art, Vaasa, Finland
- Colour Urban Structures, Galerie Artfinder, Hamburg, Germany; Galerie Vanguardia, Bilbao, Spain; Galerie Brandstrup, Oslo, Norway

2009

- Ola Kolehmainen, The New Art Gallery Walsall, West Midlands, UK
- Ola Kolehmainen, Galleri Brandstrup, Oslo, Finland
- Ola Kolehmainen, Kiasma, Helsinki, Finland

2008

- Ola Kolehmainen, Galería SENDA, Barcelona, Spain
