= Lena Henke =

German artist

Lena Henke (born 1982) is a German sculptor, photographer and installation artist.

Henke has exhibited at Kunsthalle Zurich, Museum für Gegenwartskunst Siegen, the Bard Hessel Museum of Art, Schirn Kunsthalle Frankfurt and the 9th Berlin Biennale. Her work is included in the collection of the Whitney Museum of American Art, and the ICA Miami.

== Life and education ==
Henke studied at the Glasgow School of Art and the Städelschule in Frankfurt/Main. Today she lives in Berlin and New York City and has participated in several international exhibitions.

== Work ==
Lena Henke tests the conditions and possibilities of sculpture with technically innovative methods of production. At the same time, she expands the range of meaning of traditional sculpture by incorporating questions of femaleness and the production of power relations in urban space. The possibilities of plastic art and sculpture serve Henke as a basis for understanding the molding (and casting) of bodies as a changeable process of design. Thus, in groups of works like Hooves, Boobs, and Sand Bodies, the process by which the work becomes a work finds representation; motifs of memesis link up with motifs of phantasmagoria; and it becomes apparent that the artist does not take her bearings from ideal conceptions but designs her sculptural figures to match her subjective mental images. In doing so, she not only engages the myth of masculinity; she also works with the strands of historical tradition—the questions of pedestal and space—to interrogate the logic of sculptural representation and representability. She holds the reins with great self-assurance, controlling the representation of women's bodies and the symbolic power of horses and intervening in the mechanisms of urban architecture. It is Henke’s far-reaching reflections on the capacity of the sculptural that enable her, conversely, to grasp urbanity as a historically evolved sculpture, whose social mechanisms of inclusion and exclusion can be altered and redefined by means of targeted interventions. Thus, Henke relocated the entrances to her exhibitions and intervened, with her street signs, in the psychology of existing urban structures. Operating this side of social and architectural power structures, Henke's works open up a highly pleasurable imaginative space in which the sculptural itself expands to encompass feminist and biographical perspectives and thus acquires a new topicality.

== Publications (Monographs) ==
- I Don't Love Berlin, Crazy City, Lena Henke/Buchhandlung Walter König, 2022
- Lena Henke: My Fetish Years, Spector Books, 2020
- Yes, I’m pregnant!, Kunststiftung NRW, 2014
- First Faces, NAK Neuer Aachener Kunstverein, Mousse Publishing, 2012

== Awards ==
- 2022 Marta-Preis der Wemhöner Stiftung, Germany
- 2019 Pollock-Krasner Foundation Grant, USA
- 2018 Rubensförderpreis der Stadt Siegen, Germany
- 2015 GWK-Förderpeis Kunst Dortmunder Kunstverein, Germany
