= Christen Sveaas =

Norwegian businessman, investor, art collector and donor

- Born: 18 June 1956 (age 69); Oslo, Norway
- Education: University of St. Gallen
- Occupations: Businessman, investor, art collector, donor
- Known for: Founder and owner of Kistefos AS
- Board member of: Vice chairman of Kistefos Museum, chairman of Anders Sveaas Allmennyttige Fond
- Parent(s): Anders Sveaas jr, Marit Sveaas (née Hansen)
- Relatives: Anders Sveaas (paternal grandfather)
- Awards: Commander of the Order of Merit (Italy), Knight, First Class of the Order of St. Olav (Norway)

Christen Sveaas (born 18 June 1956) is a Norwegian businessman, investor, art collector, and donor. He is the founder and sole owner of Kistefos AS, vice chairman of the board of the Kistefos Museum, and chairman of the board of Anders Sveaas Almennyttige Fond.

== Early life ==
Christen Sveaas was born in Oslo, and was awarded a degree from the University of St. Gallen in 1981. His paternal grandfather is Anders Sveaas (1840–1917), who founded the company Kistefos Træsliberi in 1889. The company was sold by the family to Viul Tresliperi in 1985, against Christen Sveaas' wish.

== Investments ==
Christen Sveaas started his first investment company in 1979, and, from 1982 to 1985, he worked at Grieg Finans before becoming independent. He made a series of successful investments (venture capital) in the late 1980s and early 1990s.

In 1993, he bought back 85% of the shares in Kistefos Træsliberi. He also merged several companies into the new investment company Kistefos, where he is the sole owner and chairman of the board. The company Kistefos has investments in dry cargo-shipping, offshore supply vessels, financial services, private equity, venture capital, technology founded investments and real estate development. Kistefos Træsliberi has interests in forestry (about 17,500 hectares or 43,000 acres), and related industrial activities in addition to various financial investments.

Sveaas initiated the Kistefos Museum, the original and fully intact wood pulp mill from 1889, of which he is the main sponsor. Since 1997, the Kistefos-Museum has been developed and now comprises a famous sculpture park. He has also contributed to the Vigeland Museum and the maintenance of Vigeland installation in Frogner Park. Sveaas is a collector of contemporary art and sculptures, and is also a wine connoisseur. At a point in time, he was rumoured to own the largest private wine cellar in the world. Sveaas was also the owner of two star Guide Michelin restaurant Bagatelle in Oslo for about 20 years, which world award-winning Chef Eyvind Hellstrøm left in 2009.

== Affiliations ==
Sveaas has served on several boards, Orkla Group, Stolt-Nielsen, Tschudi & Eitzen, Vestenfjeldske Bykreditt, SkipsKredittforeningen and privately owned Treschow-Fritzøe. Furthermore, he is the chairman of the board for the Anders Sveaas Almennyttige Fond, a Norwegian charitable foundation founded in 1990, which owns several antique string instruments, among which are two Stradivarius Violins and one Stradivarius Cello. Its focus is to support organisations without relevant public funding, and young promising classical musicians through scholarships and instrument loans.

Sveaas is a member of Dean's Council, Executive Committee at Harvard Kennedy School. Sveaas is also a founding member of the Metropolitan Museum International Council in New York and member of Tate International Council in London. Furthermore, he is a global patron of Art Basel and a member of HSG Advisory Board at the University of St. Gallen.

== Honors ==
Sveaas is a Commander of the Order of Merit in the Republic of Italy and a Knight, First Class of the Order of St. Olav for his contribution to the Arts.

== Political affiliations ==
Politically, he has supported the Progress Party, and the Liberal Party ahead of the 2001 Norwegian parliamentary election, 2009 and 2013, and the Conservative Party ahead of the 2007 Norwegian local elections and 2015, and 2009 Norwegian parliamentary election and 2013. He donated 2 million kroner to the Christian Democratic Party ahead of the 2025 Norwegian parliamentary election.

== Personal life ==
Christen Sveaas is the son of Anders Sveaas Jr (Son of Consul Anders Sveaas, founder of AS Kistefos Træsliberi) and Marit Sveaas (née Hansen, granddaughter of Consul Hans Jørginus Hansen from Trondheim), and grew up in Oslo.
