= Nathalie Djurberg and Hans Berg =

Swedish-born artist duo

Nathalie Djurberg & Hans Berg
- Occupation: Visual artists
- Notable work: Tiger Licking Girl's Butt (2004); Turn into Me (2008); The Parade (2011); The Secret Garden (2015)
- Awards: Carnegie Art Award (2007); Silver Lion – Venice Biennale (2009); Cairo Biennale Prize (2010)
- Nathalie Djurberg
- Born: 1978 (age 47–48); Lysekil, Sweden
- Education: Malmö Art Academy
- Hans Berg
- Born: 1978 (age 47–48); Rättvik, Sweden

Nathalie Djurberg and Hans Berg are a Swedish-born artist duo. They have been working together since 2004.

Some of Djurberg's notable works are:Turn into Me (2008), I Found Myself Alone (2008) and Hungry, Hungry Hippoes (2007) The Parade (2011) The Secret Garden (2015)

== Early life and education ==
Nathalie Djurberg was born in 1978 in Lysekil, Sweden. From 1994 to 1995, Djurberg received a Basic Art Education from the Folkuniversitetet in Gothenburg. She attended the Hovedskous Art School in Göteborg from 1995 to 1997. During Djurberg's schooling in Hovedskous she primarily focused on painting. Her painting skills are proven with the way her plasticine figures are modeled – her prowess gives her figures gestural expressionism. Djurberg received her Master's degree from Malmö Art Academy in 2002.

Hans Berg, who was born in 1978 in Rättvik, is a self-taught musician. He primarily focuses on electronic organic sounds using synthesizers. Djurberg and Berg met in Berlin in 2004 and have been working together ever since.

== Work ==
Nathalie Djurberg and Hans Berg, an artistic partnership established in 2004, have created narratives encompassing symbolism and emotional depth, drawing from allegorical myths and vivid, nightmarish imagery. Notable works include "Tiger Licking Girl's Butt" (2004), "We Are Not Two, We Are One" (2008), "The Parade" (2011), "The Secret Garden" (2015), "Worship" (2016), and "Dark Side of the Moon" (2017).

Djurberg is best known for producing claymation short films that are faux-naïve, but graphically violent and erotic. Their main characters, as described by The New York Times, "are girls or young women engaged in various kinds of vileness: from mild deception, friendly torture and oddly benign bestiality to murder and mayhem;" the characters are often subjected to "dismemberment, sexual humiliations and abuse, [and] attacks in a family setting or amid a strangely hostile nature. Her work concerns carnal and perverse relationships between people and animals, often involving sexual acts; her pieces have been likened to nightmarish fairy tales that do not resolve into happy endings. The films are accompanied by music by Hans Berg. Though Djurberg started out as a painter, she found herself unsatisfied with images that could only show a singular scene; this lead her to experiment with animation, which became her niche because it "foreground[ed] her interest in action and movement." She began making her own unique style of Claymation in 2001 and in 2004 she worked closely together with Berg to make narratives rich with symbolism that also often had humorous aspects to it.

Djurberg's works have been shown at Performa (2007), at Tate Britain (2007), at the P.S.1 Contemporary Art Center in New York (2006) and at the Berlin Biennial of Contemporary Art (2006). They were also featured at solo shows at the Kunsthalle Wien (2007) and at Färgfabriken in Stockholm (2006).

Their first large-scale installation, "Turn Into Me" (2008), debuted at Fondazione Prada, was curated by Germano Celant. This installation was subsequently exhibited at the Prada Transformer in Seoul, a temporary structure designed by Rem Koolhas and OMA. Djurberg and Berg also worked in virtual and augmented reality space, creating "It Will End in Stars" (2018) with Acute Art and "This Is It" (2019) for Apple [AR]T Walk, curated in partnership with the New Museum.

Their collaborations have been globally exhibited. In 2009, their installation "The Experiment" was presented at the 53rd Venice Biennial "Making Worlds," earning them the Silver Lion for Best Emerging Artists.

In 2011, the Walker Art Center in Minneapolis organized and exhibited The Parade: Nathalie Djurberg with Music by Hans Berg, which traveled to the New Museum in New York (2012) and Yerba Buena Center for the Arts in San Francisco (2012–2013).

In 2012, their installation at the New Museum showcased life-sized sculptures of over eighty bird species crafted from wire, foam, silicone, painted fabric, and clay. In 2012 at the new museum Djurberg's installation included life-size sculptures of over eighty birds: pelicans, flamingos, turkeys, eagles, a dodo, and a snowy owl. These large pieces were made of wire, foam, silicone, painted fabric, and clay. The birds were depicted raising their wings, twisted their necks, and groomed each other. Many of them opened their mouths ferociously.

Their oeuvre is included in collections of institutions such as the Fondazione Prada, Milan; Goetz Collection, Munich; Hammer Museum, Los Angeles; Moderna Museet, Stockholm; Solomon R. Guggenheim Museum, New York; The Museum of Modern Art, New York; and Whitechapel, London. They are represented internationally by Tanya Bonakdar, Giò Marconi, and Lisson Gallery. Exhibitions of their sculptures and animated films accompanied by hypnotic soundtracks have taken place at the Museum Frieder Burda, Salon Berlin.

Their works have been featured in major institutions, including The Walker Arts Center and The New Museum in the U.S., The Schirn Kunsthalle in Germany, Kistefos Museum in Norway, and Moderna Museet in Stockholm, Sweden. Permanent public sculptures are displayed at Borås Konstmuseum and Wanås sculpture park.

In 2020, their work "Crocodile, egg, man" sold for a record 16.3 million SEK, the highest sum for a contemporary Swedish artwork.

In 2022, Italian luxury brand Miu Miu invited the duo to present an artistic intervention at the 2022 Autumn Winter collection showcase at Palais d'Iéna. Following this successful collaboration, they launched a jewelry collection with Miu Miu, featuring Ísadóra Bjarkardóttir Barney as the face of their campaigns.

=== Clay animation and digital videos ===
- Camels Drink Water (2007; 3:47 min.), Edition of 4, music by Hans Berg
- We are not two, we are one (2008; 5:33 min.), Edition of 4, music by Hans Berg
- Turn into me (2008; 7:10 min.), Edition of 4, music by Hans Berg

== Artistic style ==
In a 2006 interview with Ali Subotnik, Djurberg expresses that she feels the clash between "the desire to do bad things and being terrified of being evil," which she cites as part of her inspiration for her works. She also mentions that her violent works are a way of moving the brutality of the real world into her studio so she can control it; Djurberg can choose to "punish" the perpetrators in her stories, or not.

Incorporating elements of animation, sculpture, and sound, Nathalie Djurberg and Hans Berg construct scenarios rich in psychological tension, exploring both human and primal desires. Djurberg, since 2001, has cultivated a unique filmmaking style marked by clay animation, through which she articulates fundamental instincts such as jealousy, vengeance, avarice, submission, and lust. Since 2004, Djurberg has been working as an artistic duo with her collaborator, musician and composer Hans Berg, complementing Djurberg's animations and installations with his atmospheric sound effects and entrancing musical scores.

Djurberg and Berg frequently construct mentally disconcerting environments in their films and sculptural installations. Their main characters, often depicted as girls or young women, are described by The New York Times as engaging in a spectrum of malevolent activities. These range from mild deceit and amicable torture, to curiously innocuous bestiality, and at the extreme, murder and chaos.

== Exhibitions ==
- 2005: Why Do I Have This Urge to Do These Things Over and Over Again? Gió Marconi, Milan.
- 2006 Färgfabriken – Center for Contemporary Art and Architecture, Stockholm
- 2006 Zach Feuer Gallery in New York City
- 2008: Turn into Me. Fondazione Prada, Milan, Italy.
- 2009: Fare Mondi / Making Worlds. 53rd Venice Biennale, Venice.
- 2010: Snakes Knows it's Yoga. Gió Marconi, Milan.
- 2011: Snakes Knows It's Yoga. Museum Boijmans van Beuningen, Rotterdam.
- 2012: A World of Glass. Camden Arts Centre.
- 2012: The Parade. New Museum, New York.
- 2012: The Parade. Walker Art Center, Minneapolis, Minnesota.
- 2013: The Black Pot. Garage Center for Contemporary Culture, Moscow.
- 2014: Maybe This is a Dream. Kölnischer Kunstverein, Cologne.
- 2015: A Thief Caught in the Act. Gió Marconi, Milan.
- 2015: The Secret Garden. Australian Centre for Contemporary Art, Melbourne.
- 2016: In Dreams. The Wanås Foundation, Knislinge.
- 2016: Flickers of Day and Night. ARoS Aarhus Kunstmuseum, Aarhus.
- 2018: Dark Side of The Moon. Stavanger Art Museum (Must), Stavanger, Norway.
- 2018: A Journey Through Mud and Confusion with Small Glimpses of Air. Moderna Museet, Stockholm.
- 2018: Delights of an Undirected Mind. Baltimore Museum of Art.
- 2019: A Journey Through Mud and Confusion with Small Glimpses of Air. Museo D'Art Moderna E Contemporanea Di Trento E Rovereto, Rovereto, Italy.
- 2019: A Journey Through Mud and Confusion with Small Glimpses of Air. Schirn, Frankfurt.
- 2019: One Last Trip to The Underworld. Tanya Bonakdar Gallery, New York.
- 2020: Flowers in The Attic. Kistefos Museum, Norway.
- 2021: The Soft Spot. Gió Marconi, Milan
- 2021: Underneath. The Nordic House, Reykjavik.
- 2021: This Is Heaven. C3A Centro De Creacion Contemporanea De Andalucia, Cordoba, Spain.
- 2021: A Moon Wrapped in Brown Paper. Prada Rong Zhai, Shanghai.
- 2023: A Pancake Moon. Tanya Bonakdar Gallery, Los Angeles.
- 2023: The Skin Is a Thin Container. Musee D'art Contemporain De Lyon, France.

== Awards and recognition ==
- 2007 Carnegie Art Award 2007, Museum of Contemporary Art Kiasma, Helsinki
- Djurberg was awarded the Silver Lion for a Promising New Artist at the Venice Biennale in 2009 for Experimentet
- Cairo Biennale Prize, 12th International Cairo Biennale, Cairo (2010)
