= Kistefos =

Norwegian investment company

Kistefos AS
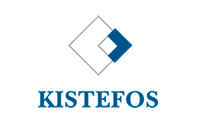
- Company type: Private
- Industry: Holding
- Founded: 1889
- Headquarters: Oslo, Norway
- Area served: Norway
- Key people: Tom Ruud (CEO); Christen Sveaas (Chairman)
- Revenue: ▲NOK 14 379 million (2018)
- Operating income: NOK 2 277 million (2018)
- Net income: NOK 1 788 million (2018)
- Owner: Christen Sveaas
- Number of employees: 16 (2012)
- Website: kistefos.no

Kistefos is a privately owned investment company owned by Christen Sveaas and led by CEO Tom Ruud. The company comprises wholly owned and part-owned industrial companies within offshore, shipping and IT, as well as strategic investments in various listed and unlisted companies, principally within banking/finance, telecommunications and property.

The company dates back to 1889 when Sveaas' family founded the lumber mill Kistefos Træsliberi.
