= Sandra Mujinga =

Norwegian-Congolese video and installation artist (born 1989)

- Born: 1989
- Education: Malmö Art Academy
- Awards: Sandefjord Kunstpris 2022 Preis der Nationalgalerie; 2021 Fredrik Roos 2015 DNB Sparebankstiftelsen Kunstpris 2013
- Website: https://sandramujinga.com

Sandra Mujinga (born 1989) is a Norwegian video and installation artist born in Goma in the Democratic Republic of the Congo and known for her work in textiles, video, sculpture and installations. Her work draws upon Afrofuturism, posthumanism and science fiction, and often both uses and critiques technology.

== Biography ==
Sandra Mujinga was born in 1989 in the Democratic Republic of the Congo, and moved to Norway as a child, where she grew up in Oslo and on Nesodden. She lost her parents in her teens. Her mother studied fashion, and always had an interest in creativity: she taught Mujinga to use a sewing machine when she was nine years old. As a teenager, Mujinga wanted to become an architect, but wasn't accepted to the school she applied to, and began studying at Malmö Art Academy instead. After art school she lived and worked in Oslo and Berlin until 2023, when she moved to New York.

Her artistic breakthrough was featured in an episode of the television series Kunstnerliv (Artist's life) by the Norwegian public broadcaster NRK in 2024.

== Career ==
Mujinga's work "poignantly speaks to Black representation, surveillance in society, and post-humanist and Afrofuturist ideas", and often uses new technologies such as holograms and video installations. She includes her own body in some of her works. For example, her three-channel video installation Pervasive Light (2021) features Mujinga wearing a cloak that combined with the use of a greenscreen causes her body to disappear, or as one reviewer described it, "causes darkness to swallow her body".

In Sentinels of Change (2021), which was exhibited at the Venice Biennale in 2022, large human-like shapes were draped in recycled textiles and saturated in green light. One reviewer described this as being "immersed in the post-apocalyptic, humanity-deprived world of artist Sandra Mujinga".

In 2021 Mujinga won the Preis der Nationalgalerie, Germany's most prestigious contemporary art award for artists under 40. The jury celebrated the "ghostly-looking figures made of interwoven lengths of fabric that seem to float through the Hamburger Bahnhof exhibition spaces", and Mujinga's "great sensitivity for the materials used."

In 2023 Mujinga moved to New York, supported by a one-year artist grant from Office for Contemporary Art Norway. Her work Flo, a hologram installation named after her mother, was purchased by MoMA, and her work Spectral Keepers (2020) was exhibited in the Solomon R. Guggenheim Museum in New York as part of the Going Dark exhibition in 2023. Flo is a ghost-like figure in a dark room, projected using the 18th century Pepper's ghost technique where a mirror reflects an image so it appears like a ghost. The figure is enacted by performance artist Adrian Blount who is wearing a wearable, leather sculpture made by Mujinga that is inspired by the Jamaican body builder Anne-Marie Crooks. The figure flickers, almost disappearing into the darkness, and according to the artist, this ephemeral presence represents the paradox of visuality for Black people: "Up till now Black bodies are either visible and being policed, or they're completely invisible." Flo has been described as ghost-like, and is named for Mujinga's mother, who died when the artist was only 15. This echos the commercial uses of holograms to depict and reanimate the deceased, and has also been described as the Black practice of "wake work", which is a practice of care for the dead theorised by the Black literary scholar Christina Sharpe.

In 2024 Mujinga was shortlisted for the Future Generation Art Prize, a global award for artists under 35.

== Solo exhibitions ==
- 2025: Skin to Skin at Stedelijk Museum Amsterdam.
- 2024: Time as a Shield at Kunsthalle Basel.
- 2023: Love Language at Croy Nielsen in Vienna
- 2023: IBMSWR: I Build My Skin With Rocks at Hamburger Bahnhof Museum.
- 2022: Solo Oslo at the Munch Museum.
- 2022: Closed Space, Open World at Malmö Konsthall.
- 2020: SONW – Shadow of New Worlds at Bergen Kunsthall.
- 2018: Hoarse Globules, at Unge Kunstneres Samfund, Oslo.

== Collections ==
Mujinga's work is included in the collection of the Museum of Modern Art, New York, and the Muzeum Sztuki, Warsaw.
