= Amy Sillman =

American painter (born 1955)

- Born: 1955 (age 70–71); Detroit, Michigan, United States
- Education: School of Visual Arts
- Known for: Painting, drawing, animation, zines
- Awards: Guggenheim Fellowship, American Academy of Arts & Letters, Joan Mitchell Foundation, Pollock-Krasner Foundation, Louis Comfort Tiffany Foundation, National Endowment for the Arts
- Website: Amy Sillman

Amy Sillman, Split 2, oil and acrylic on canvas, 75" x 66", 2020.

Amy Sillman (born 1955) is a New York-based visual artist, known for process-based paintings that move between abstraction and figuration, and engage nontraditional media including animation, zines, and installation. Her work draws upon art historical tropes, particularly postwar American gestural painting, as both influences and foils; she engages feminist critiques of the discourses of mastery, genius and power in order to introduce qualities such as humor, awkwardness, self-deprecation, affect, and doubt into her practice. Profiles in The New York Times, ARTnews, Frieze, and Interview, characterize Sillman as championing "the relevance of painting" and "a reinvigorated mode of abstraction reclaiming the potency of active brushwork and visible gestures." Critic Phyllis Tuchman described Sillman as "an inventive abstractionist" whose "messy, multivalent, lively" art "reframes long-held notions regarding the look and emotional character of abstraction."

== Education and early career ==
Sillman was born in Detroit, Michigan in 1955 and raised in Chicago. At age 19, she moved to New York to study Japanese, but shifted to art, earning a BFA at the School of Visual Arts in 1979. During that time, she immersed herself in ongoing debates about the viability of contemporary painting and became involved with the downtown feminist and counterculture movements, as an assistant to artist Pat Steir and a member and contributor of the feminist journal Heresies. She exhibited sporadically, participating in group shows at PS 122, New Museum, Drawing Center and PS1, among others. She began gaining attention in the mid-1990s for solo exhibitions at Lipton Owens Company, Casey Kaplan, and in the early 2000s, Brent Sikkema (later called Sikkema Jenkins).

During that period, Sillman earned an MFA from Bard College (1995) and joined the school's art faculty in 1996. She taught in Bard's MFA painting program from 1997 to 2013, and served as chair of the painting department from 2002 to 2013. She subsequently taught at the Städelschule in Frankfurt, Germany.

Amy Sillman, Detail from The Umbrian Line, gouache, ink, pencil on paper, approx. 9" x 12", 2000; entire work, 25 sections approx. 15" x 400" total.

== Work and reception ==
Sillman's art combines traditional formal concerns—explorations of color, shape, surface and line, play with figure and ground, scale, and flat versus recessive space—that she complicates with approaches from other media (drawing, cartoons, collage, animation) and unconventional display strategies. She employs an interior, personal process—largely grounded in drawing—that involves constructing, deconstructing and reconstructing the painting space through layers of transformation, improvised action and redaction. Artforum critic Linda Norden wrote that this commitment to "constructive erasure" and "unpainting" distinguishes Sillman from Abstract expressionists (e.g., de Kooning and Guston) that she is compared to. Sillman's art is marked by a direct engagement with materials and radical shifts in palette, brushwork, scale and the structuring logic of either drawing or painting. Critics attribute the dialectical quality of her work—playful, incisive humor and angst, comic awkwardness and prowess, figuration and abstraction—to these shifts.

=== Earlier painting ===
Sillman's earlier work moved between figure, landscape and abstraction, fusing loose painting and drawing into what reviews described as dreamlike, absurd or wistful psychological narratives. Rendered in cheery, vaguely acidic palettes, these paintings depicted simple, self-contained figures—often a small, Eve-like woman wandering open grounds—amid Boschian piles of biomorphic shapes, abstract scumbles, drips and calligraphic linework. New York Times critic Roberta Smith noted their dense "undergrowth" of imagery and "translucent delicacy," which she wrote, "pok[ed] fun at painting's often masculine sense of bravura, while offering alternative forms of turbulence and power." Helen Molesworth wrote that paintings such as Me and Ugly Mountain (2003)—which depicts a lone figure dragging, an enormous bundle of shapes, scrawls and "neurotic energy" by a thinly painted line—shifted the feminist critique of the gaze from the structure of representation to the feelings that arise when one is aware of being looked at.

Amy Sillman, Purple Thing, oil on canvas, 80" x 72", 2006.

In the mid-2000s, Sillman's heap-like compositions gave way to an enlarged scale, broader, more physical gestures and explorations of the body, interpersonal dynamics, the erotic and psychosexual tension. These works consisted of patches of high-contrast color bursting with chaotic line and web-like scaffolding, open fields of subtly modulated color, and crude figurative elements emerging along compositional fault lines or out of rough edges and thickets of brushstrokes (The Elephant in the Room, 2006). In 2007, Sillman began creating large gestural abstract paintings based on black-and-white drawings she made from observing couple friends in casual moments of domestic intimacy. She recreated the original drawings from memory, then rotated and reworked them into abstract painting "templates." The paintings consisted of richly hued, abutting trapezoidal shapes on flat picture planes, which were crisscrossed and circumscribed by bold angular, diagrammatic lines reminiscent of architecture or sculptural construction. She exhibited the paintings and drawings at the Hirshhorn Museum in 2008; Artforum described the drawings as "equally tender and ruthless" in touch and economical in their markmaking.

=== Later painting, drawing and animation ===
Sillman mounted several exhibitions in the 2010s that were noted for their invention, restlessness and new formats that emphasized temporal aspects of her work. Her first major museum retrospective, "one lump or two" at the Institute of Contemporary Art (2013), included paintings rooted in a smartphone drawing application and cartoons, diagrams, zines and "animated drawings" that Artforum's Cameron Martin wrote, "pack just as much of a wallop as her starkly physical canvases." The initial animated drawings expanded on or reworked variations of individual paintings and were displayed on small screens, reflecting the modest scale of their creation. The shows "the All-Over" (Portikus, 2016) and "Mostly Drawing" (Gladstone 2018) featured sequential, end-to-end installations (like film frames or accordion books) of multi-media works combining silkscreened or ink-jet printed, painted and drawn elements. Their layered networks of figurative elements, abstract gesture and blended color passages created a sense of metamorphic transformation across pieces and effaced lines between reproduction and spontaneity, painting and print. Frieze critic Elisa R. Linn wrote of Panorama (2016), "traces of [Sillman's] thinking coalesce on the canvas, revealing fragile forms apparently stuck in the constant process of their own remaking."

Amy Sillman, Installation from "the All-Over" exhibition, 24 canvasses silkscreened and painted in acrylic and ink, each panel approx. 50" X 70", 2016, Portikus, Frankfurt, Germany.

In 2017, Sillman presented After Metamorphoses (The Drawing Center), a five-minute, looped and projected animated drawing that was her most complex and ambitious to date. It condensed Ovid’s fifteen-book epic poem Metamorphoses into a shape-shifting amalgamation of abstract painting and layered, interpenetrating forms and landscapes. Its digitally drawn shapes and characters underwent strange, sometimes mythical or comical mutations in a manic rhythm that extended the figuration-abstraction oscillation characteristic of her broader practice.

Sillman presented less process-oriented work marked by current-day political concerns in the exhibition "Landline" (Camden Arts Centre, London, 2018). The show included "Dub Stamp" (2018), twelve double-sided works on paper hung on a diagonally stretched cord, which were based on drawings of a figure crawling along abjectly in the aftermath of the 2016 U.S. presidential election. She silkscreened the originals at a larger size and worked into them; Artforum wrote of its simultaneously playful and violent effect: "broken-up, magnified, and displaced shapes step into the breach of a world de-constituting itself as objective reality. They index … the slipperiness of a reality that is increasingly ungraspable, one in which the space between things is quickly evaporating."

Sillman's 2020 exhibition, "Twice Removed," (Gladstone) juxtaposed large, improvisational canvases and paper works—layers of silk-screened polka-dot passages, calligraphic swoops, stripes and brushed stains of color, and hints of figuration—with a surprising new body of work: small, delicate flower still lifes. Reviews described the slightly askew compositions of the paintings as evoking a sense of looming things on the verge of tottering over, or of shifting ground—a reflection of a fraught year plagued by the COVID pandemic. The New Yorker's Hilton Als wrote that the spontaneity of the still lifes—painted while in pandemic-driven seclusion—conveyed "the lush despair and loneliness of van Gogh’s sunflowers and irises" and "the joy and the sadness inherent in time."

From June 28, 2025–May 31, 2026, Dia Bridgehampton exhibited Amy Sillman: Alternate Side (Permutations #1–32). The exhibit “Sillman reimagines the relationship between figure and ground, using the gallery wall as a literal ground on which the improvisational and systematic coalesce.”

=== Zines, writing and curating ===
In 2009, while living in Berlin, Sillman began producing a zine, The O-G, that she often paired with her exhibitions or paintings; in 2020 it had reached its fourteenth issue. The O-G has included a wide range of material: cartoons, satiric art-world dinner seating charts, essays, visual and textual pieces fleshing out threads in Sillman's art, as well as work by other artists and writers.

Sillman has written about art and artists for catalogues and journals such as Artforum, ARTnews, Texte zur Kunst, and Frieze. She has published four collections of her writing, the last being Faux Pas (2020, After 8 Books, Paris), which includes essays on John Chamberlain, Eugène Delacroix, Rachel Harrison, Laura Owens, and contemporary painting's inheritances from Abstract Expressionism.

Sillman has curated exhibitions at MoMA (2019), Hammer Museum (2008) and Artists Space (2005). The MoMA show, "The Shape of Shape" (assembled with MoMA curator Michelle Kuo and Jenny Harris), gathered 75 objects from the museum's collection, from well-known artists to some that never exhibited at MoMA; Roberta Smith wrote that the show's "robust visual appetite" addressed the "fear of painting, color and form" that has allowed contemporary painting to lose ground to conceptual art and its derivatives.

== Awards and collections ==
Sillman has been recognized with a Guggenheim Fellowship (2001), election to the American Academy of Arts and Letters (2020), and awards from the National Endowment for the Arts (1995), She has received awards from the Joan Mitchell, Louis Comfort Tiffany and Pollock-Krasner foundations, the American Academy in Berlin (2009), and Brooklyn Museum (2012), among others.

Her work belongs to the public collections of the Art Institute of Chicago, Baltimore Museum of Art, Blanton Museum of Art, Brooklyn Museum, Hammer Museum, Los Angeles Museum of Contemporary Art, Metropolitan Museum of Art, Milwaukee Art Museum, Moderna Museet (Stockholm), Museum Brandhorst (Munich), Museum of Modern and Contemporary Art of Trento and Rovereto (MART), Museum of Fine Arts, Boston, MoMA, National Gallery of Art, Saatchi Gallery, San Francisco Museum of Modern Art, Tate Modern, Weatherspoon Art Museum, and Whitney Museum, among others.

Sillman has exhibited at institutions including the Museum of Modern Art (MoMA), Whitney Museum, Institute of Contemporary Art, Boston, and Portikus (Frankfurt). Her work was included in the 2024 exhibition Making Their Mark: Works from the Shah Garg Collection at the Berkeley Art Museum and Pacific Film Archive (BAMPFA).
