= Helter Skelter: L.A. Art in the 1990s =

Helter Skelter: L.A. Art in the 1990s, named after The Beatles' song that motivated Charles Manson, was a contemporary art exhibition held from January 26, to April 26, 1992, at the L.A. Museum of Contemporary Art. Organized by Paul Schimmel, Helter Skelter displayed the work of 16 artists. Featuring works of sex, violence, and warped Americana, the exhibition aimed to destroy stereotypes of L.A. art and challenge the New York school. At the time Helter Skelter was hailed as the prime example of modern contemporary art and is still held as one of the most important and influential contemporary art exhibits I

== Artists ==
The exhibition included work by:

- Chris Burden
- Meg Cranston
- Victor Estrada
- Llyn Foulkes
- Harry Gamboa, Jr.
- Richard Jackson
- Mike Kelley
- Liz Larner
- Paul McCarthy
- Manuel Ocampo
- Raymond Pettibon
- Lari Pittman
- Charles Ray
- Nancy Rubins
- Jim Shaw
- Megan Williams
- Robert Williams
