= The Mountain School of Arts =

Art school in Los Angeles, California

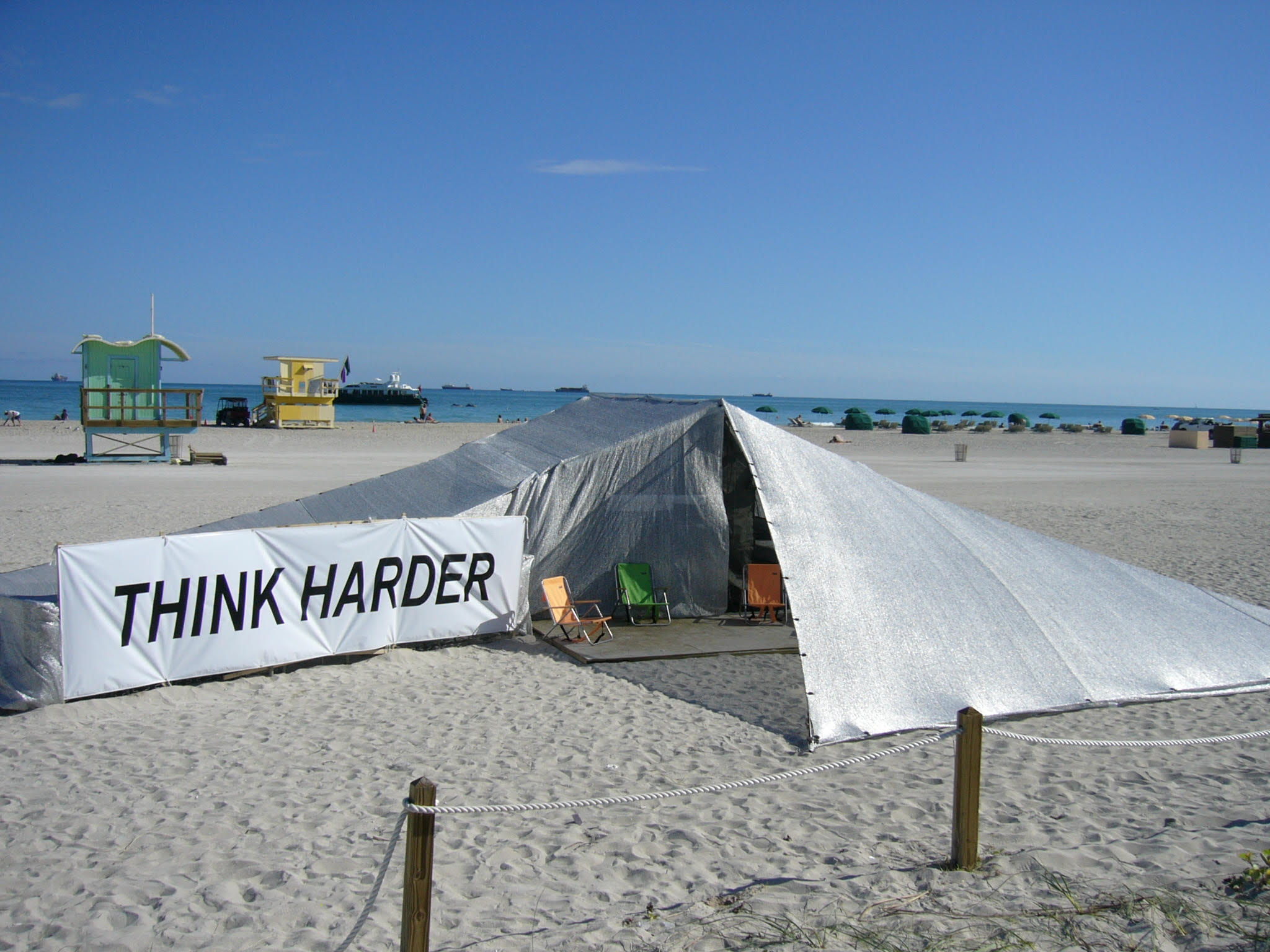
Presentation from the Mountain School of Arts at Art Basel at Miami Beach in 2006

The Mountain School of Arts, or MSA^, is a tuition-free, independent, artist-run alternative school based in Los Angeles. Founded in 2005 by Piero Golia and Eric Wesley, it is the oldest continuous artist-run school in California.

== History ==
The Mountain School of Arts was named after the original meeting place of the school: the upper floor of The Mountain Bar in Chinatown, Los Angeles. The idea of "a free, bare-bones, yet ambitious graduate school— no tuition, no degree, but a vigorous curriculum— centered on talks and seminars led by visiting artists and curators" was the result of a conversation between founders Golia and Wesley. Dan Graham and Simone Forti presented free talks to whoever showed up to the school.

The program began in 2005 and initially took place over three months (from mid-January to mid-April), with participants convening at the Mountain Bar in addition to several off-site field trips across the city. The Mountain Bar officially closed in 2012, ending the artistic activity centered around the locale. Afterwards, the Mountain School of Art adopted a new format, with classes over an annual intensive three week period instead of the original three months.

== Structure and curriculum ==
MSA^ is often cited as one of the most successful examples of an art school that exists outside of the Educational Industrial Complex, along with the Whitney Museum of American Art's Independent Study Program (ISP). The development of the school and its program have been written about as "follow[ing] a poetic of the gesture, of the instant, and of actions recalling Fluxus, Gino de Dominicis’ or Paul McCarthy’s works." The school has been featured as one of the most prominent alternative art education models in several exhibitions, notably in the 2010 festival No Soul For Sale – A Festival of Independents organized by the Tate Modern, as well as the 2006 edition of Art Basel in Miami Beach, USA.

The school curriculum extends beyond fine arts, offering classes in a wide range of subjects including science, law, philosophy, culinary arts, and others. The program is open to students from different backgrounds, whether local or international. Housing is provided for the duration of the program. There are no course requirements or grades; the students are not expected to produce anything while taking part in the program.

Every year the MSA^ accepts around 12 students. Due to the intensity of the two-and-a-half week program, the students are asked to clear their schedule of other obligations for the duration of the course. The relationships developed by the students while living and spending most of their time together makes up an important part of the MSA^ experience, as knowledge and friendship overlap.

Artists and curators who have served as guest faculty for students at the Mountain School of Arts include: Myriam Ben Salah, Tacita Dean, Thomas Demand, Simone Forti, Dan Graham, Pierre Huyghe, Richard Jackson, Martin Kersels, Paul McCarthy, Hans Ulrich Obrist, Catherine Opie, Henry Taylor, Jeff Wall, and Andrea Zittel. Notable alumni include: Ida Ekblad, Jordan Wolfson, Wendy Yao, and Noah Davis.
