= Eric Wesley =

American artist (born 1973)

Eric Wesley (born 1973) is an American artist who works with a variety of media including sculpture and painting. He is based in Los Angeles.

== Biography ==
Wesley was born and raised in Los Angeles, California, the son of two social workers. As a child, he planned to become an aeronaturical engineer. He earned a fine arts degree from University of California, Los Angeles in 1996. While Wesley primarily works from Los Angeles, he previously had a studio in Berlin.

Wesley's work encompasses sculpture and painting, among other media, and have been displayed around the world. He has held solo exhibitions at galleries including the Museum of Contemporary Art, Los Angeles and Foundation Morra Greco, Naples, Italy. He has participated in group shows at the Hammer Museum in Los Angeles; CAPC musée d'art contemporain, Bordeaux; Fundación/Colección, Mexico City; ARCOS Museo d’Arte, Benevento, Italy; the Prague Biennial in 2007; Institute of Contemporary Arts, London; P.S. 1, New York; the Whitney, New York; and the Studio Museum in Harlem. His work was part of the collection TV executive Dean Valentine donated to the Hammer Museum in 2007. He has worked extensively with China Art Objects Galleries, Bortolami Gallery, and Maureen Paley. He was included on ArtReview's Future Greats list in 2005 and 2008.

He is also the co-founder of Mountain School of Art (MSA) in Los Angeles, an artist-run nomadic school that he opened in January 2006 with Piero Golia. They accept 15 fellows annually to a three-month program. The classes are free and all staff are volunteers. In 2008, Wesley told ArtReview that it was less of an art school and more of "an institution patterned on the university model and devoted to general education, with a curriculum grounded in science, philosophy and law."

== Solo exhibitions ==
Year	City	Gallery	Title	Notes	Refs
1999	Los Angeles	China Art Objects Galleries	Camper		
2000	Los Angeles	China Art Objects Galleries	Kicking Ass		
2001	Pasadena	Caltech	Two Story Clock Tower	Erected on the Caltech campus	
2002	New York City	Metro Pictures Gallery	New Amsterdam		
2002	Karlsruhe	Meyer-Reigger Galerie	Enchilada “The Endless Burrito”		
2002	Turin	Galeria Franco Noero	Ouchi		
2003	Basel	Art Basel	Jeans Theory, Statements		
2004	Los Angeles	China Art Objects Galleries	Pico Youth Center		
2004	Miami	Locust Projects	Eric Wesley I love WW2		
2005	Amsterdam	Bowie-Van Valen Gallery			
2006	Karlsruhe	Meyer-Riegger Gallery	Audi		
2006	Naples	Galleria Fonti	You say Tomato, I say Tomato		
2006	Los Angeles	China Art Objects Galleries	Erik Wesley		
2006	Los Angeles	Museum of Contemporary Art	MOCA FOCUS: Eric Wesley		
2006	Los Angeles	Pacific Design Center	Thirty Three Point Three Three Three		
2007	New York City	Bortolami Gallery	Spaference Room		
2007	Naples	Foundation Morra Greco	Spa fice		
2007	Münchenstein	Kunsthaus Baselland			
2007	Turin	Galeria Franco Noero			
2008	Berlin	Feurig59	Ship Shape Shit Shelf and the Empfang Box		
2009	London	Maureen Paley	New Realistic Figures		
2010	New York City	Bortolami Gallery	D’Carts Blanche and New Paintings		
2011	Los Angeles	China Art Objects Gallery	The Same ‘Ol New Frontier		
2012	New York City	Bortolami Gallery	2 new works		
2015	Los Angeles	356 Mission	Some Work		
2016	Minneapolis	Midway Contemporary Art	ISOSCELES TRAPEZOID ARCH		
2019	Los Angeles	TIMESHARE	Turning Tables		
2019	Los Angeles	Pico Pico	Timbuctoo	Alternate title: Sticks and stones may break my bones but words fucking kill me	
2019	London	Sprovieri Gallery	Reputation		
2022	New York City	Bortolami Gallery	Eric Wesley/St Louis		
2024	New York City	Martos Gallery	Three Sleeping Philosophers		

== Group exhibitions ==
Year	City	Gallery	Exhibition title	Notes	Refs
1998	Santa Monica	Rosamund Felsen Gallery	I-Candy		
1998	Los Angeles	Brent Petersen Gallery	Drawings for Works in Progress		
1999	Los Angeles	L.A. Edge Festival		Organized by Simon Watson	
2000	Los Angeles	ACME Gallery	Young and Dumb	Curated by Pentti Monkkonen	
2001	New York City	Studio Museum in Harlem	Freestyle	Sculpture: Kicking Ass	
2001	Santa Monica	Santa Monica Museum of Art	Freestyle		
2001	San Diego	Museum of Contemporary Art, San Diego	Ultrabaroque: Aspects of Post-Latin American Art		
2001	Los Angeles	UCLA Hammer Museum	Snapshot: New Art From Los Angeles		
2001	Miami	Museum of Contemporary Art	Snapshot: New Art From Los Angeles		
2001	New York City	Artists Space	Purloined	Ran September 6 - October 13	
2001	Karlsruhe	ZKM Center for Art and Media	Circles 3: Silver Lake Crossings	Curated by Christoph Keller	
2001	New Plymouth	Govett-Brewster Art Gallery	Drive: Power, Progress, Desire	Curated by Gregory Burke	
2001	New York City	Metro Pictures Gallery			
2002	Richmond	Reynolds Gallery	Drive By: Nine Artists from Los Angeles		
2003	Los Angeles	Craft and Folk Art Museum	Fade (1990–2003)	Curated by Malik Gaines	
2003	Los Angeles	China Art Objects Galleries	Works for Giovanni		
2003	Glasgow	Transmission Gallery	More Boots = Many Routes	With Lee O’Connor and Ryan Doolan	
2003	Turin	Galeria Franco Noero	New Space! New Show!		
2003	Guadalajara	OPA: Oficina Para Proyectos de Arte	Adios Pendejos		
2003	London	Campoli Presti	Eduardo Sarabia and Eric Wesley		
2004	New York City	Whitney Museum of American Art	Whitney Biennial		
2004	Vienna	Museum für Angewandte Kunst	3 Fireplaces and 2 Bathtubs		
2004	San Francisco	Contemporary Jewish Museum	100 Artists See God	Curated by John Baldessari and Meg Cranston, organized by ICA	
2005	New York City	Bortolami Dayan		Gallery opening event	
2005	New York City	Bortolami Dayan	Closing Down: Thanks		
2005	Los Angeles	Los Angeles Contemporary Exhibitions	A Walk to Remember	Organized by Jens Hoffmann	
2005	London	Institute of Contemporary Arts	100 Artists See God	Curated by John Baldessari and Meg Cranston, organized by ICA	
2005	Virginia Beach	Virginia Museum of Contemporary Art	100 Artists See God	Curated by John Baldessari and Meg Cranston, organized by ICA	
2005	Reading	Freedman Art Center	100 Artists See God	Curated by John Baldessari and Meg Cranston, organized by ICA	
2005	New York City	I-20 Gallery	Installations		
2005	New York City	I-20 Gallery	Having Differences		
2006	Minneapolis	Midway Contemporary Art	Axis of Praxis	Curated by Nate Lowman	
2006	Los Angeles	Black Dragon Society	Designomite	Curated by Parker Jones	
2006	London	Institute of Contemporary Arts	Alien Nation	Curated by John Gill, Jens Hoffmann and Gilane Tawadros	
2006	Long Island City	P.S. 1 Contemporary Art Center	The Gold Standard		
2006	New York City	Bortolami Dayan	Survivor	Curated by David Rimanelli	
2006	Nashville	Cheekwood Museum of Art	100 Artists See God	Curated by John Baldessari and Meg Cranston, organized by ICA	
2007	Prague	Prague Biennale			
2007	Los Angeles	Lizabeth Oliveria	Milieu		
2007	Los Angeles	Angles Gallery			
2007	Venice, CA	Balmoral Gallery	One Foot High and Rising		
2007	Athens	Kalfayan Gallery	Darling, Take Fountain		
2007	New York City	Bortolami	Substance & Surface		
2008	Los Angeles	China Art Objects Gallery	The Light of the Virgo		
2008	Pougues-les-Eaux	Centre d'Art du Parc Saint Léger	Los Angeles Confidential		
2008	San Francisco	Wattis Institute for Contemporary Arts	Amateurs		
2008	Benevento	ARCOS Museo d’Arte	ITALIA ITALIE ITALIEN ITALY WLOCHY		
2008	Los Angeles	Kathryn Brennan Gallery	Globetrotters	Curated by Katie Brennan	
2008	New York City	Parrish Art Museum	Sand- Meaning and Metaphor		
2009	Los Angeles	Hammer Museum	Second Nature: Dean Valentine Collection		
2009	Los Angeles	China Art Objects Gallery	1999		
2010	Los Angeles	Museum of Contemporary Art	The Artist's Museum		
2010	New York City	Bortolami Gallery	RE-DRESSING		
2010	Los Angeles	China Art Objects Gallery		The Inauguration of China Art Objects in Culver City, Los Angeles	
2010	Mexico City	Fundación Colección Jumex	Les enfants terribles		
2010	Los Angeles	Cottage Home	Video Journeys		
2011	Amsterdam	Temporary Stedelijk Museum 3	Making Histories – Changing Views of the Collection		
2011	New York City	483 Broadway, SoHo	Greater LA		
2011	Bordeaux	CAPC musée d'art contemporain	BigMinis: Fetishes of Crisis		
2014	Los Angeles	Hammer Museum	A Public Fiction	Part of Made in L. A. 2014	
2014	Los Angeles	Paradise Garage	LIQUOR STORE		
2015	Chicago	Museum of Contemporary Art	Out of Office	Organized by Grace Deveney	
2016	Cahokia	Abandoned Taco Bell at 1296 Camp Jackson Road	The Bell		
2019	Long Island City	SculptureCenter	Searching the Sky for Rain	Curated by Sohrab Mohebbi	
2019	Los Angeles	Hammer Museum	Dirty Protest: Selections from the Hammer Contemporary Collection		
2021	New York City	Bortolami Gallery	Springweather and people		
2022	New York City	Whitney Museum of American Art	Whitney Biennial 2022: Quiet As It's Kept		
2023	New York City	Bortolami	SWIZZLE TWIDDLE FIDDLE STICKS	Ran 8 Sep - 4 Nov	
