= Emily's Sassy Lime =

American punk rock band

- Origin: Calabasas, Pasadena, Irvine, California, United States
- Genre: Garage punk • riot grrrl • noise rock • indie rock
- Years active: 1993–1997
- Label: Kill Rock Stars
- Members: Wendy Yao; Emily Ryan; Amy Yao
- Website: MySpace profile

Emily's Sassy Lime (a palindrome) was an American punk rock group from Southern California. The group was formed in 1993 by three Asian American teenagers: sisters Wendy Yao and Amy Yao, and their friend Emily Ryan.

== History ==
Emily's Sassy Lime formed in 1993 after the teen girls sneaked out of their homes one night to see a Bikini Kill and Bratmobile show, striking up a correspondence with Molly Neuman, the drummer of the latter band. As first generation Asian American girls in a punk band, they faced contradictions in expectations. They did not live very close to each other and did not own cars, so they often had to write their songs over the phone, sometimes leaving seminal ideas for tunes, jingles, and melodies on each other's answering machines. When they finally did have a chance to record, they did so on a 'singalodeon', a cheap off-the-shelf lo-fi tape recorder. They barely ever practiced (often forbidden from doing so by their parents who considered their studies a bigger priority), making their sound a random, spontaneous indie garage punk-noise collage of "Whatever, just play." They didn't have their own instruments for years, so with every show they played, they had to borrow someone else's in the DIY punk spirit of sharing, often swapping with each other carelessly and making every show sound totally different.

In 1995, they all appeared as dancers in the Kathi Wilcox-directed "Mad Doctor" video for The PeeChees. Emily's Sassy Lime broke up in 1997, not long after they graduated from high school and attended separate colleges. Amy Yao went to Art Center College of Design, Wendy Yao headed off to Stanford University, and Emily Ryan attended University of Southern California. The group are often considered an essential early riot grrrl band.

== Later activities ==
In 2000, they all participated in the very first Ladyfest in Olympia, the Yao sisters collaborating with Sharon Cheslow in the experimental sound installation performance art project of Coterie Exchange, during an art exhibit curated by Audrey Marrs. In 2003, Emily Ryan starred in one of Jon Moritsugu's critically acclaimed no budget guerrilla underground punk films called Scumrock. Amy Yao has been involved over the years with several different bands, frequently collaborating with Tobi Vail, co-founded China Art Objects Galleries, and completed her MFA in sculpture at the Yale School of Art. Wendy Yao owned and ran a shop and DIY indie-punk artist space in Los Angeles's downtown Chinatown neighborhood called Ooga Booga for 15 years. The Yao sisters later played in a band with Layla Gibbon of Skinned Teen named Shady Ladies.

The band reunited in 2025 to perform at the Opening Block Party for the California Biennial exhibition at the Orange County Museum of Art. The biennial's title is named after their first LP ("Desperate, Scared, But Social") and featured an exhibit from the group. They reunited again in 2026 as special guests of Bikini Kill at the Daisy Chain Fields charitable music festival founded by Olivia Rodrigo.

== Discography ==
=== LPs ===
- Desperate, Scared But Social, LP, KRS Records, 1995

=== Singles ===
- "Summer Vacation", 7", Xmas Records, 1994
- "Dippity Do-nut", 7", KRS Records, 1996

=== Compilations ===
- "Right Is Here", LP/CD, Xmas Records, 1995

=== Compilation appearances ===
- A Slice of Lemon, LP, Lookout Records/KRS, 1995
