= Alfredo Aceto =

Italian artist

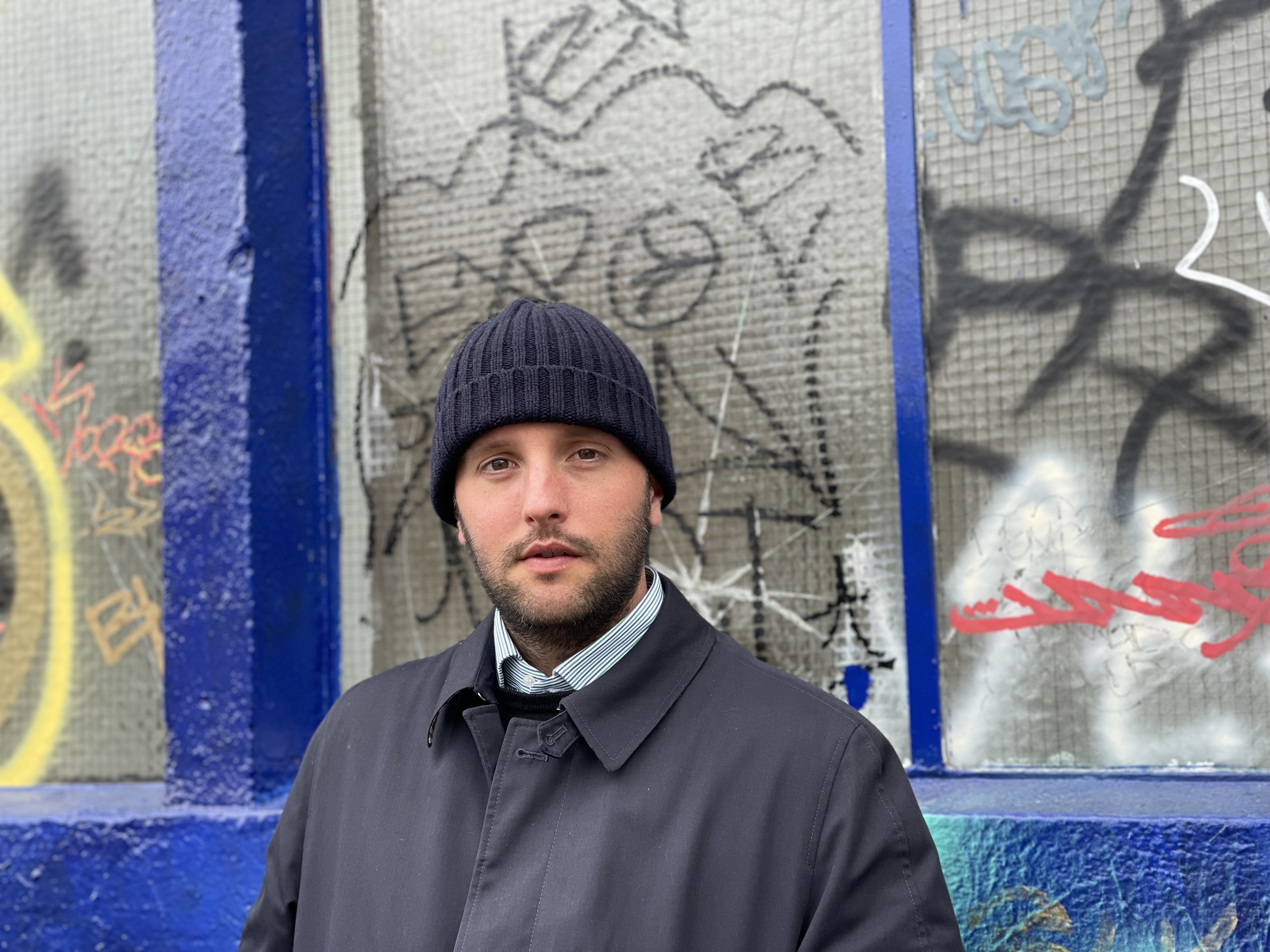
- Alfredo Aceto in 2023
- Born: March 29, 1991 (age 35); Turin
- Known for: Contemporary Art
- Website: Alfredo Aceto

Alfredo Aceto (born 1991) is an Italian and Swiss visual artist based between Paris and Geneva. Aceto was born in Turin, Italy. He studied fine arts at the École cantonale d'art de Lausanne (ÉCAL) with Philippe Decrauzat and Valentin Carron , the École nationale supérieure des beaux-arts de Lyon (ENSBA) and The Mountain School of Arts (MSA^). His work has been exhibited in many international surveys, including DOC!, Paris, Museo Canonica, Rome, Museo del Novecento, Milan, Centre d'art contemporain Genève, Kunsthaus Glarus, MAMCO in Geneva and Musée cantonal des beaux-arts de Lausanne . His practice includes film, installation, performance, text and sculpture, and is mainly concerned with the body and the biography.

== Art work ==
Using among others sculpture, film and sound, Italian and Swiss artist Alfredo Aceto creates spaces suspended between fiction and reality. His environments are places to live, in which one can find a sort of melancholy, artificial time alteration and image saturation. The objects he produces are traces, functional elements for the construction of the space where the blurred boundaries between his personal timeline and the collective one express the way chronology can be manipulate. His work arises from the will to create a place where would mix together the various strata of a linear form of time, turning into a platform from which signs of different ages emerge. Developing his work in a creative path that passes through multiple and never truly resolved phases of growth. Alfredo Aceto nurtures his own research by questioning his own self and, more in general, the ego that reigns in every person, if only on a latent level. Aceto is currently teaching at ECAL in Lausanne. In 2018 he is nominated for Swiss Art Awards in Basel. In 2019 he is the recipient of the prestigious Leenaards Culture Grant from the Fondation Leenaards.

== Exhibitions ==
=== Solo and Duo exhibitions ===
- 2024 Full Moon Sergio, CIRCUIT, Centre d'Art Contemporain, Lausanne, Switzerland
- 2024 Parliament Unlimited, Paris, France
- 2024 MLIS, Maison du Livre, de l'Image et du Son, Villeurbanne, France
- 2024 HUA International, Beijing, China
- 2023 Builders Supply, Lange + Pult, Zurich, Switzerland
- 2022 Chew, with Thomas Liu Le Lann, Vin Vin, Vienna
- 2021 Ambarabà ciccì coccò, Kunst Halle Sankt Gallen St. Gallen
- 2020 Kevin, Kunst Raum Riehen, Riehen
- 2019 Sequoia 07, Swiss Institute, Milan
- 2016 Something between Posthistoria and Prehistoria, Barriera and Albert Stiftung Foundation, Turin
- 2016 Modesty or Surprise, Museo Pietro Canonica a Villa Borghese, Rome
- 2016 Everyone stands alone at the heart of the world, pierced by a ray of sunlight, and suddenly it’s evening, COSMIC Galerie, Bugada & Cargnel Paris
- 2015 Refaire le Portrait #Acte 1, Centre d'Art Contemporain de Genève, Genève
- 2015 Refaire le Portrait #Acte 2, Lavorare lavorare lavorare, preferisco il rumore del mare, Centre d'Art Contemporain de Genève, Geneva

=== Selected group exhibitions ===
- 2019 #80|90, Académie de France à Rome, Villa Medici, Rome
- 2019 Immersione Libera, Palazzina dei bagni misteriosi, Milan
- 2019 Still Life: An Ongoing Story, Galerie Sébastien Bertrand, Geneva
- 2019 La métamorphose de l’art imprimé, Zeitgenössische Westschweizer Editionen und serielle Unikate, VFO, Verein fur Originalgraphik, Zurich
- 2018 Swiss Art Awards, Messe Basel, Basel
- 2018 Le Colt est Jeune & Haine, DOC!, curated by Cédric Fauq, Paris
- 2018 Talent Prize, Mattatoio, Rome
- 2018 Performance Program Code Art Fair, curated by Irene Campolmi, Bella Center, Copenaghen
- 2018 Greffes, Lateral Art Space, Cluj-Napoca
- 2018 Re-Routing Nature, Alfredo Aceto, Jakob Kudsk Steensen, Adrien Missika, Biitsi, Rune Bosse, Viktor Timofeev, curated by Irene Campolmi, Sixty-Eight Art Institute, Copenaghen
- 2018 Greffes, Beatrice Burati Anderson Art Space, Venice
- 2017 La Norme Idéale, Levy Delval, Brussels
- 2017 X, Galerie l'ELAC, Renens
- 2017 Shivers Only, with Iván Argote, Mohamed Bourouissa, Antoine Donzeaud, Julien Goniche, Angélique Heidler, Thomas Mailaender, Hubert Marot, Naoki Sutter-Shudo, La Paix, Paris
- 2017 National Museum of Contemporary Art, Bucharest
- 2017 Terrasse 2017, Silicon Malley, Lausanne
- 2017 Greffes, with Mohamed Namou, Achraf Touloub, Villa Medici, Rome
- 2017 Happiness is a Fiat 500, White Cuib, Cluj-Napoca
- 2017 Mementos, curated by Piper Marshall and Jens Hoffmann, Tours et Taxis, Brussels
- 2017 Prix MAIF pour la sculpture 2017, MAIF Social Club, Paris
- 2017 Alfredo Aceto, Nicola Martini, Lionel Maunz, DITTRICH & SCHLECHTRIEM, Berlin
- 2017 Premio Moroso, curated by Andrea Bruciati and Paola Pivi, Museo Etnografico, Udine
- 2017 Solidi Platoonici, La Rada, Locarno
- 2017 General Audition, curated by Samuel Gross and Stéphane Kropf, L'élac, Lausanne
- 2016 In Mostra – corpo, gesto, postura, curated by Simone Menegoi, Artissima, Turin
- 2016 The Milky Way, Gio Marconi, Milan
- 2016 Il Principio è solo e solo un centro spostato verso il centro, COSMIC Galerie, Bugada & Cargnel Paris
- 2016 Souvenir d'été, Villa Medici, Rome
- 2016 I would've Done Everything For You / Gimme More!, Flat 7, 22 Westland Place, curated by Cédric Fauq, London
- 2016 Kiefer-Ablitzel, Swiss Art Awards, Basel
- 2016 All the Lights We Cannot See, Random Institute, Pyongyang
- 2016 Texture and Liquidity, The Workbench International, Milan
- 2015 Death of the Shambls, Silicon Malley, Prilly
- 2015 Wincklemans, PAZIOLI, Chavannes-près-Renens
- 2015 Unter 30 Junge Schweizer Kunst Kiefer Hablitzel Preis, Kunsthaus Glarus, Glarus
- 2015 Nuit des Musées, Musée Jenisch, Vevey
- 2015 Kiefer-Ablitzel, Swiss Art Awards, Basel
- 2015 LISTE, Bugada & Cargnel, Basel
- 2015 L'heure qu'il est, Centre d'Art Contemporain (CACY), Yverdon-les-Bains
- 2015 Lavorare lavorare lavorare, preferisco il rumore del mare, Kunsthalle Geneva, Centre D'Art Contemporain, Geneva
- 2015 Club of Matinée Idolz, CO2 Gallery, Turin
- 2014 The Go-Between, Museo di Capodimonte, Naples
- 2014 The Arcades Project, Galerie Bugada & Cargnel, Paris
- 2014 Jump, Gasconade at Art-O-Rama, Marseille
- 2014 World Wide, WALLRISS, Fribourg
- 2013 One Thousand Four Hundred and Sixty Peep-Hole, Peep-Hole, Milan
- 2013 ARI MORTIS, curated by Milovan Farronato and Roberto Cuoghi, Museo del 900, Milan, Italy
- 2012 There is a différence between a shaky or out-of-focus photograph and a snapshot of clouds and fog banks, curated by Philippe Decrauzat, ECAL
- 2011 Soirée, Centro Luigi Pecci, Prato

== Residencies ==
- 2026 WIELS, Bruxelles
- 2020 Istituto Svizzero, Milan
- 2018 Swiss Art Awards, Messe Basel, Basel
- 2018 Talent Prize, InsideArt Magazine, Rome
- 2017 MAIF, Prix pour la sculpture, Paris
- 2017 Premio Moroso, Udine
- 2016 Cité internationale des arts, Paris
- 2016 Kiefer Hablitzel Preis, Messe Basel, Basel
- 2016 MSA^, Mountain School of Art, Los Angeles
- 2015 Kiefer Hablitzel Preis, Messe Basel, Basel
- 2015 Kunsthalle Geneva, Centre d’Art Contemporain, Geneva
- 2014 Residency Unlimited (RU), New York City
- 2013 Full Scale, Museo del Novecento, Milan
- 2010 Ville de Lille, Lille

== Publications ==
- Immersione Libera, ed Galleria Continua
- ArtClub, ed Pier Paolo Pancotto, Académie de France à Rome – Villa Médicis
- Fortezzuola, ed Pier Paolo Pancotto, Nero Magazine
- Premio Moroso, text by Cédric Fauq. Catalogue
- As If We Never Said Goodbye, text by Elise Lammer. Ed. Dittrich & Schlechtriem
- Something between Posthistoria and Prehistoria. Texts by Stéphanie Serra and Tristan Lavoyer. Barriera and Albert Stiftung Foundation (Pro Helvetia)
- Alfredo Aceto | Andrea Bellini. First Monograph HAPAX. JRP Ringier 2015
- Unter 30 XI Junge Schweizer Kunst Kiefer Hablitzel Preis. Catalogue. Kunsthaus Glarus
- L'heure qu'il est, Centre d'Art Contemporain Yverdon (CACY). Catalogue
- TEXTSCORE. Entretiens avec Arthur Fouray
- De Generation of Painting. Fondazione 107
- The Go In Between. Museo di Capodimonte
- Km011. Umberto Allemandi & C
- Interview Julien Previeux. Alfredo Aceto and Jean Bourgois, ECAL
