= Julie Becker =

American artist (1972–2016)

- Born: 1972; Los Angeles, California
- Died: 2016 (aged 43–44); Los Angeles, California
- Known for: Contemporary Art
- Notable work: Researchers, Residents, A Place to Rest (1996)

Julie Becker (1972–2016) was an American artist, best known for her 1996 installation, Researchers, Residents, A Place to Rest. Her work addresses themes of temporariness, social mobility, and imagination as they apply to domestic and commercial spaces. Installation, sculpture, photography, and video were Becker’s usual mediums, although her later work is characterized by drawing and assemblage.

Becker was born and raised in Los Angeles, California and earned both her BFA and MFA from CalArts. Her work has appeared at the Whitney Museum of American Art and the Museum of Contemporary Art, Los Angeles and is included in the permanent collections of the Museum of Modern Art (MoMA), the Solomon R. Guggenheim Museum, the Hessel Museum of Art, the Denver Art Museum, and the Migros Museum of Contemporary Art. Her work is represented by Greene Naftali Gallery.

Becker spent the majority of her adult life living in Echo Park, and died by suicide in 2016 at the age of 43.

== Early life and education ==
Julie Becker was born and raised in Los Angeles, California. The daughter of struggling artists, she had an itinerant childhood, moving between a series of low rent apartments, and possibly some Single Room Occupancy hotels. In the 1990s, Los Angeles was growing rapidly, and class divisions became more extreme. The L.A. housing crisis cost L.A. County 562,000 jobs. These conditions are connected to her later interests in homelessness and the temporary domestic space.

Becker attended Santa Monica High School, but began her BFA at CalArts in lieu of her senior year. She would become the youngest student to attend CalArts, enrolling in 1989 at the age of 16. She studied briefly in Berlin in 1991 before receiving her MFA from CalArts in 1996. Her MFA thesis project, Researchers, Residents, A Place to Rest received early acclaim and became her best known work.

== Career ==
=== Researchers, Residents, A Place to Rest ===
Julie Becker's most notable work, Researchers, Residents, A Place to Rest (1996), is a multi-room installation created for her CalArts MFA thesis project. The installation was chosen by Paul Schimmel for the 1996 São Paulo Biennial. Researchers, Residents, A Place to Rest, consists of three sections: a waiting room/psychiatrist's office, a room containing cardboard refrigerator boxes and two miniature models of domestic interiors, and a fictional researcher's storage room/resource library. Becker populates her miniature models with two fictional characters: Danny Torrance of The Shining (1980), and Eloise of Kay Thompson’s children's books. Danny and Eloise embody the effects of inhabiting a temporary space in childhood, referring to their imaginative worlds for control and freedom.

The waiting room features a desk and name plate, as well as a series of alternative name plates on the ground. They read, “Real Estate Agent,” “Psychiatrist,” “Entertainment Agency,” “Concierge.” Behind the desk hang floor plans of a ground and second floor, respectively labeled “The Intuitive Approach,” and “The Objective Attempt.” Two further labels delineate the space and prepare visitors for the next rooms: “You Are Here,” and “Optional Entrance.” A leather sofa, cabinet, Vogue magazine, Stephen King special TV guide, and an ashtray are arranged throughout the room. This first room of the installation, playing the role of the waiting room and psychiatrist’s office, situates the viewer in a liminal and purgatorial space.The nature of the room promises comfort, while the absence of reason obscures it.

The second space consists of two miniature models, recalling the floor plans in the waiting room, and cardboard refrigerator boxes. The models are positioned low in the room and viewers must experience from above or crouch down to see detail. Specific areas are illuminated by standard scale lamps and magnifying glasses are provided, evoking a crime scene aesthetic. Some of the miniature furniture was borrowed from dollhouses, while some pieces were constructed out of toothpicks and other materials. The models have a general feeling of temporariness, with glue visible around the edges. This feeling is furthered by the small wheels attached to the base of each model, allowing for quick transport.

Becker described the cardboard refrigerator boxes as, “the last refuge for the homeless.” They take on an anthropomorphic role, although overtly anonymous. They reiterate the forms of the miniature models, and also imply a blank and transient playground for childhood fantasy.

The final room of the installation is a backroom/storage space, and indicates the presence of the ‘researcher.’ There, visitors find files on the fictional ‘residents,’ the diaries of Danny and Eloise, enlarged photographs from the miniature models, and a small TV playing Becker’s Conversations With Voxx (1995). In some iterations of the show, visitors were welcome to flip through papers in the research room, and even take xerox copies with them. The researcher role is accepted by the viewer, who has engaged curiously with the previous two rooms, as well as the artist herself.

Researchers, Residents, A Place to Rest was exhibited in 1997 at Kunsthalle Zurich. It was officially gifted to the MoMA in 2003. Its last exhibition with Becker’s guidance was at the MoCA show Sittings: Installation Art 1969-2002. It went on display a final time, without the artist's presence, in MoMA’s 2019 retrospective, Julie Becker: I must create a Master Piece to pay the Rent.

=== Other work ===
Becker began photographing her series, Interior Corners (1993), while still a teenager.

Her video, Transformation and Seduction (1993/2000), overlays spoken passages from Vladimir Nabokov’s Despair (1934) with clips from live-action disney films like The Gnome-Mobile (1967). In most of the video, a young girl wanders endlessly through the forest, while references to Despair’s mirror self narrative ensue. The 1993 version of Transformation and Seduction included voiceover from the artist’s father.

Her 1999 Installation, Suburban Legend, played Pink Floyd’s Dark Side of the Moon over The Wizard of Oz. The phenomenon of this pairing is known as The Dark Side of the Rainbow.

For her 1999 installation, Golden Force Field, Becker built a white room housing a table, lamp, and photograph.

Becker planned to show her last and still unfinished project, Whole, at the Greene Naftali gallery in 2002. Like Researchers, Residents, A Place to Rest, Whole is a sum of many parts. Whole includes a video of a model of the California Federal Bank building on Sunset Boulevard passing through a hole in Becker's living room, a tiki bar, a drawing of a pyramid on the dollar bill, and a sculpted fragment of sidewalk. Music for the video, Federal Building with Music (2002), was borrowed from a cassette tape she found abandoned in the bank parking lot.

=== References and influence ===
Becker's work repeatedly references The Wizard of Oz (1939) and The Shining (1980). Becker’s interest in the Wizard of Oz parallels themes of psychological and physical relocation. Other key reference points include The Gnome-Mobile (1967), Despair (1934), and the Eloise books.In Becker's work, fictional characters produce a quality of continuance, unburdened by time and inaccessible beyond the stretch of their media-visible lives.

Her aesthetic can be connected to the American Suburban Gothic of American Beauty (1999) and Twin Peaks (1990-91, 2017). Artists such as Jake and Dinos Chapman, Gregory Crewdson, Cindy Sherman, and Abigail Lane similarly interrogate the “contemporary gothic”. Los Angeles artists such as Diana Thater and Andrea Zittel also consider themes of domesticity and interior spaces, speaking to the experience of many Los Angeles residents who lived in poor conditions during the ‘90s.

== Later life and death ==
Becker spent most of her adult life living in an Echo Park bungalow, owned by the California Federal Bank located above it. She lived there cheaply with the agreement that she remove the belongings of a previous inhabitant, who died from AIDS related illness. The abandoned material life of the previous resident became a psychic catalyst for Becker’s Whole.

Although Becker’s work received early acclaim, she continued to live in poverty until her suicide in 2016, at the age of 43.

== Remembrance ==
I must create a Master Piece to pay the Rent was a retrospective exhibition at MoMA that ran between June 9th and September 2nd of 2019. The title of the exhibition was drawn from Becker’s 2015 drawing, watering.

== Solo and two-person exhibitions ==
- I must create a Master Piece to Pay the Rent, presented at MoMA PS1, New York (2019) and the Institute of Contemporary Arts, London (2018)
- Greene Naftali, New York (2016)
- Seville Biennial, Seville (2006)
- Sightings, Museum of Contemporary Art, Los Angeles (2003)
- Greene Naftali, New York (2002)
- In Sync: Cinema and Sound in the work of Julie Becker and Christian Marclay, Whitney Museum of American Art, New York (2000)
- Julie Becker: Researchers, Residents, a Place to Rest, Kunsthalle Zurich (1997).
