= Aceto =

Aceto could refer to:

- Italian for vinegar
- A compound that contains an acetyl group
- Alfredo Aceto (born 1991), an Italian artist
- Aceto (album), a 2010 album by Michéal Castado
