= Aria Dean =

American critic, artist, and curator

Aria Dean (born 1993) is an American artist, critic, and curator. Until 2021, Dean served as Curator and Editor of Rhizome. Her writings have appeared in various art publications including Artforum, e-flux, The New Inquiry, Art in America, and Topical Cream. Dean has exhibited internationally at venues such as Foxy Production and American Medium in New York, Chateau Shatto in Los Angeles, and Arcadia Missa in London. Dean also co-directs As It Stands LA, an artists project space that opened in 2015. Dean lives and works in New York City and Los Angeles. She is represented by Greene Naftali.

== Early life and education ==
Dean was born in 1993, and raised in Pasadena, California by parents involved in the Los Angeles Film industry. Her father is an assistant director, and her mother is a producer. She graduated from Oberlin College in 2015.

== Work ==
After graduating from Oberlin College, Dean was appointed social media coordinator for the Museum of Contemporary Art.

In September 2016, ARTnews announced that Dean had been appointed assistant curator of net art and digital culture for Rhizome. Dean helped Rhizome's efforts to preserve, present, and re-perform works of net art from the 1980s to the present day (called Net Art Anthology), organize events, and publish articles online. Dean stepped down as Editor and Curator in January 2021 to pursue her solo practice and a new project.

Dean's first solo exhibition, Baby Is A Cool Machine, opened at American Medium in 2017. The exhibition, according to the gallery's website, "hones in on her materially-driven examination of the situation of blackness in the United States." The show was critically praised by James Hannaham at 4Columns and selected by Kat Herriman as a Critic's Picks for Artforum. In 2018, Aria Dean was named one of Cultured Magazine's 30 artists under 35.

In late 2017, Dean curated New Black Portraitures as part of Rhizome's Net Art Anthology. The online exhibition included visual artists Manuel Arturo Abreu, Hamishi Farah, Juliana Huxtable, Rindon Johnson, Pastiche Lumumba, N-Prolenta (Brandon Covington), Sondra Perry, and Redeem Pettaway and, "explored the changing status of black portraiture in relation to strategies for visibility, concealment, and self-representation online."

In early 2018, Dean wrote and directed a play for the Swiss Institute in New York.

Her second solo exhibition, lonesome crowded west, featured sculptural objects and installation that "shuttle between experiences as personally lived and the sweeping generalizations of the media and historical modernism" according to critic Matt Stromberg of Hyperallergic. In an interview with Travis Diehl, Dean revealed sourcing the clay in her painting-like sculpture from Mississippi, and that the series speaks to her "proximity and distance in relation to that place." Other works featured crowd shots from hip-hop videos, a two-channel installation that explore the loneliness of black existence in predominantly-western contexts.

"They index the sort of relationship that I was interested in, subsuming oneself into this particularly black crowd where individuals that already don’t exist so distinctly as "proper" western individual subjects get subsumed into this other object. The show title is from a Modest Mouse album, The Lonesome Crowded West (1997), and I’m not a huge Modest Mouse fan, but I like the album. I latched onto that phrase. "The Lonesome Crowded West" is my situation in relationship to the objects. I am the lonesome crowd, in the west…"

== Exhibitions ==
=== Solo exhibitions ===
- Wolves, Progetto, Lecce, IT, 2023
- Show Your Work Little Temple, Greene Naftali, New York, NY, 2021
- Aria Dean: Suite!, REDCAT, Los Angeles, CA, 2021
- Aria Dean, Albright–Knox Art Gallery, Gallery for New Media, Buffalo, NY, 2018
- lonesome crowded west, Château Shatto, Los Angeles, 2018
- Gut Pinch, The Sunroom, Richmond, VA 2018
- Baby is a Cool Machine, American Medium, New York, NY 2017

=== Selected two-person exhibitions ===
- White Ppl Think I'm Radical, Arcadia Missa, London, U.K., 2017

=== Selected group exhibitions ===
- The Color Scheme 2025 Performa Biennial, Abrons Arts Center, New York, NY
- Making Their Mark: Works from the Shah Garg Collection 2024 Berkeley Art Museum and Pacific Film Archive
- 2022 Whitney Biennial - "Quiet as It's Kept" curated by Adrienne Edwards and David Breslin
- Made in L.A. 2020: a version, organized by Myriam Ben Salah and Lauren Mackler, Hammer Museum, Los Angeles, CA 2021
- Greene Naftali, New York, NY, 2020
- The Pain of Others, curated by Myriam Ben Salah, Ghebaly Gallery, Los Angeles, CA 2018
- Condo New York: Château Shatto, Los Angeles, presents: Jean Baudrillard, Body by Body, Aria Dean, Jacqueline de Jong, Foxy Productions, New York, NY 2017
- At this stage, Château Shatto, Los Angeles, CA 2017

=== Selected lectures/presentations ===
- "Notes on BlacceleraLon," Reed College, September 1, 2017
- "Blackness Against the Digital," University of the Arts, Helsinki, April 2017
- "Busta Rhymes at the End of the World," Machine Project, LA, February 24, 2017
- "Our Bodies, Online" panel at the New School, February 7, 2017
- "Blackness in CirculaLon," panel at Open Score, New Museum, 2016
- "Due West," Arcadia Missa/Dominica Reading at LACA, Los Angeles 2016

== Bibliography ==
=== Essays ===
- "Notes on Blacceleration" (e-flux, 2017)
- "The Demand Remains" (The New Inquiry, 2017)
- "Poor Meme, Rich Meme" (REALLIFE Magazine, 2016)
- "Alex Da Corte" (Artforum, 2016)
- "Closing the Loop" (The New Inquiry, 2016)
- Dean, Aria (August 1, 2023). Bad Infinity. London: MIT Press. ISBN 978-3-95679-647-0.
