= China Art Objects Galleries =

Art gallery in North America

- Established: 1999
- Location: 6086 Comey Ave, Los Angeles, CA; 90034 United States
- Coordinates: 34.03516°N 118.37702°W
- Founders: Amy Yao, Peter Kim, Mark Heffernan, Steve Hanson and Giovanni Intra
- Website: www.chinaartobjects.com

China Art Objects Galleries is a contemporary art gallery co-founded by a group of artists in Los Angeles in 1999. Founder Steve Hanson moved the gallery to Mérida, Mexico, in 2021.

== History ==
Named after a box sign attached to the unit, China Art Objects was founded in 1999 by a group of friends that included Peter Kim, Amy Yao, Mark Heffernan, Steve Hanson, and Giovanni Intra. The gallery evolved out of the critical theory program at the Art Center College of Design in Pasadena, California where they had been students. The gallery was first located in Los Angeles' Chinatown neighborhood on Chung King Road, and the gallery was instrumental in bringing about a renaissance in Los Angeles art and in particular the Chinatown district.

Designed by artist Pae White, the gallery officially opened its doors in January 1999. Shortly after its opening, the gallery became mainly a project of artist/writer/critic Intra and artist/musician/librarian Hanson (with Heffernan staying on as a silent partner).

China Art Objects exhibited a new generation of Los Angeles artists, as well as presenting international projects. Early exhibitions included solo and two person presentations by Laura Owens & Scott Reeder, Jorge Pardo & Bob Weber, Sharon Lockhart & George Porcari, Frances Stark, Jon Pylypchuk, Eric Wesley, Jonathan Horowitz, David von Schlegell, Angus Fairhurst, R.H. Quaytman, Jennifer Moon, Morgan Fisher, Sean Landers, Walead Beshty, and Julie Becker. Alongside the exhibition program in that first year, the gallery hosted a record release party for Stephen Prina, a poetry reading with Mike Kelley, and a Mia Doi Todd concert in an alleyway adjacent to the gallery. Indie label Kill Rock Stars donated their discography for the basement record library, housed in a secret room designed by Andy Ouchi and Andy Alexander.

In 2002, co-founder Intra unexpectedly died in New York City after attending the opening for one of the gallery's artists. In an obituary for Frieze, Will Bradley wrote, "Giovanni Intra died much too young on 17 December 2002 in Manhattan. He will be remembered for his achievements as an artist, writer and co-founder of China Art Objects Galleries in Los Angeles, and equally for his enthusiasm, intelligence, integrity, warmth and all-around obvious decency in an art world where those characteristics can sometimes be in short supply."

A history of the space up to 2005 was published as a chapter in Recent Pasts: Art in Southern California from the 90s to Now.

China Art Objects is currently run by original founder Hanson and wife Tuesday Yates. Hanson has exhibited under the name Leo Mock. In 2010, the gallery moved from its landmark Chinatown location to Culver City, California. In 2021, Hanson and Yates moved China Art Objects to Mérida, Mexico. Their inaugural exhibition was "The Notebook" by Cuban artist Marco Castillo, founder of Los Carpinteros arts collective.
