= Megan Williams (artist) =

Sculptor (born 1956)

- Born: 1956 (age 69–70); Cleveland, Ohio
- Education: California Institute of the Arts, B.F.A., 1978
- Known for: Contemporary art
- Notable work: Helter Skelter
- Movement: Expressionism; Surrealism

Megan Williams (born 1956) is a contemporary artist who creates wall drawings, three-dimensional drawings, and traditional sculpture.

== Early life and education ==
Born in 1956 in Cleveland, Ohio, in the U.S., Williams earned a B.F.A. in 1978 from the California Institute of the Arts. As of 1990, Megan Williams was married, and had a son.

== Critical reception ==
Williams' earliest exhibits were collaborative. Mark Rosenthal of University of California's Berkeley Art Museum Pacific Film Archive commented in 1978 that in Williams' collaboration with Jon Borofsky, "the artists worked on each other's images in the manner of participants in a jazz rhythm section who respond to one another's musical thoughts, alternately leading or following."

As early as 1983, art critics explicitly reviewed Williams' work favorably. John Russell of The New York Times called her an "artist of true quality". By 1993, Roberta Smith of The New York Times characterized her work as "figurative political art", comparing the "animated autonomy of her lines" with that of Betsy Friedman Murunashi-Lederman and Nicole Eiseman.

The Santa Monica Museum of Art 1990 description of Williams' wall drawing, Totem, pointed out she "took advantage of the freedom of working on a large scale and in an ephemeral situation". Williams herself explained her wall art: "I see an entire room as a blank sheet of paper, allowing the viewer to exist in it, rather than outside of it. It places the work in closer proximity to the psychological space with which we surround ourselves."

Christopher Miles of ArtForum in 2003 called Williams a "master of laugh-till-you-hurt images that invite our projections like Rorschach blots". In 2008 he observed that Williams' practice was "turning the inner outward", a defining characteristic of her work, noting she "substitutes the goofy for the surreal, effecting what is indeed a kind of expressionism, but one that is as self-effacing and comic as it is assertive and heroic." Miles identified two modes that Williams uses: the first, lighthearted, optimistic contemplation; and the second, humor in a cartoon format to suggest "violence and angst". He wrote, "Williams' images, while fantastic and fairy-taleish in their specifics, are quite the opposite in their tenor and implications."

In 2008, critic Holly Myers of the Los Angeles Times described Williams' style as "unmistakable": using cartoonish forms such as human figures and anthropomorphized buildings; suggesting "rubbery agility, giddy pictorial buoyancy and an often furious sense of internally generated motion". A gallery's 2008 description of her work said it was "populated by careening forces and dyspeptic explosions," noting one work was "sci-fi and apocalyptic", an "outburst of atomic proportions".

ArtsBlock at the University of California, Riverside, characterized Williams in 2014 as "a painter who uses cartoon imagery in her paintings that depict characters with riotous, bad mannered attitudes".

== Selected exhibitions ==
Williams has exhibited at multiple venues:

- Arena 1 Gallery, Santa Monica, "On the Wall", 2011
- Carl Berg Gallery, Los Angeles, "Purge, 2008"
- Center for the Arts, Eagle Rock
- Christopher Grimes Gallery
- The Corcoran Gallery of Art, Washington D.C.
- The Drawing Center, New York, "Selections, Fall 1991"
- Japanese American National Museum
- John Post Lee Gallery, New York
- Los Angeles Museum of Contemporary Art
- Museum of Contemporary Art, "Helter Skelter", 1992
- Orange County Museum of Art
- Otis/Parsons, Los Angeles
- Santa Monica Museum of Art, "Drawn from Memory", 1990
- Sweeney Art Gallery
- University Art Museum at UC Santa Barbara
- University of California, Berkeley Art Museum Pacific Film Archive
- Sweeney Art Gallery, UCR ArtsBlock, "Figurative Language"

== Awards ==
1992 Art Matters Fellowship

1997 California Community Foundation's Fellowships for Visual Artists
