= Greene Naftali Gallery =

Contemporary art gallery in New York City

Coordinates: 40.749787°N 74.003652°W

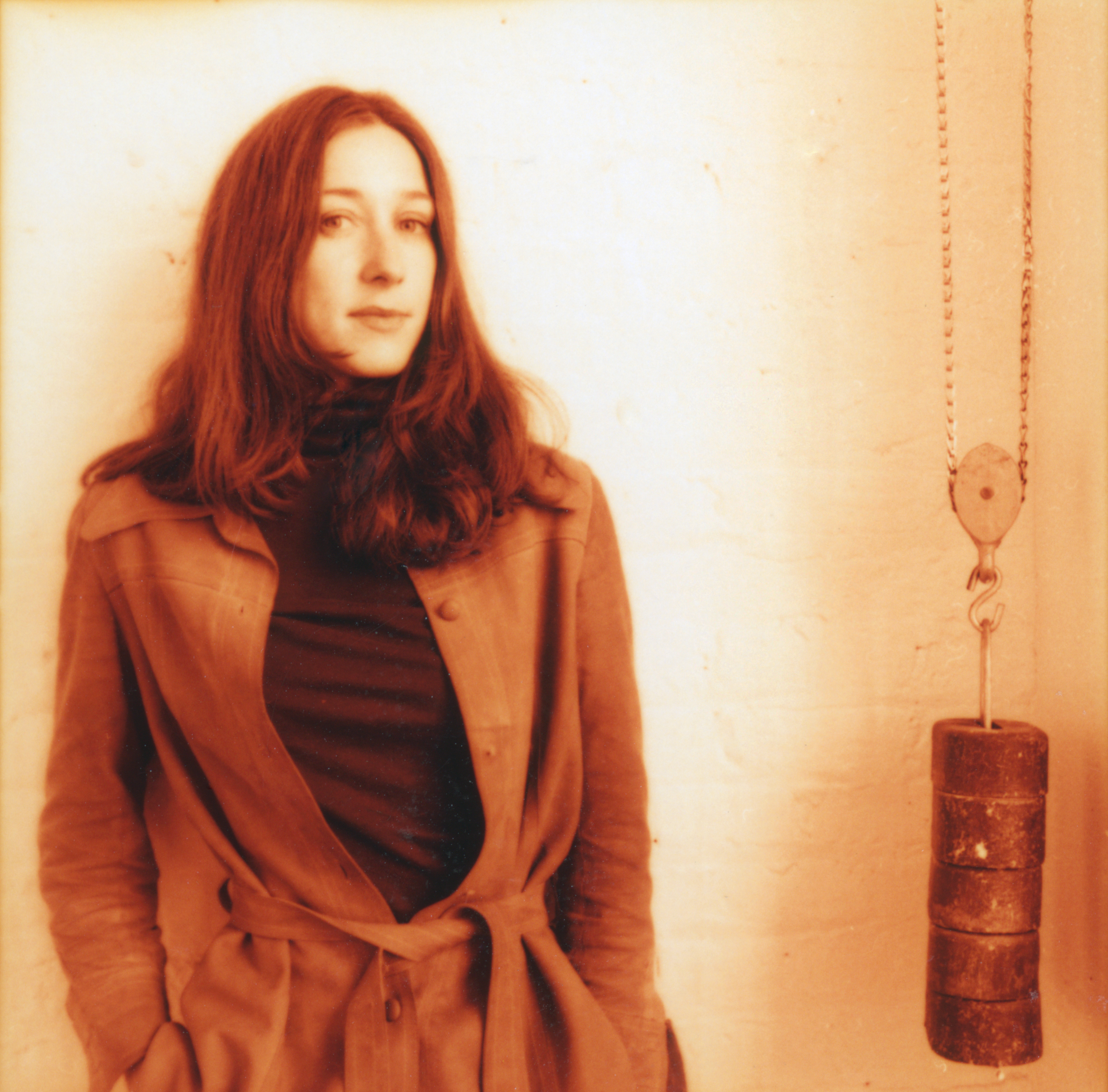
Carol Greene

Greene Naftali is a contemporary art gallery located in the Chelsea neighborhood of New York City.

== Owner ==
Carol Greene is an American art dealer and founder of Greene Naftali. She was born and raised in Quincy, Massachusetts, and received a B.A. from Harvard University. After college, Greene moved to New York City, where she began working at John Good Gallery in SoHo. In 1995, she opened Greene Naftali. In addition to her gallery, she is involved in a number of arts organizations, including Artists Space, where she serves on the board of directors. Greene lives in New York City with her partner, artist Craig Kalpakjian.

== History ==
Carol Greene and Gloria Naftali founded Greene Naftali in 1995, making it one of the first galleries to open in Chelsea. The gallery shows contemporary art in various media—including painting, video, music, and fashion—and has a reputation for championing emerging artists as well as historical figures, including Rachel Harrison, Dan Graham, Jacqueline Humphries, Paul Chan, Helen Marten, Michael Krebber, and Tony Conrad.

Greene Naftali is also renowned for its ambitious performance programming with music events by Thurston Moore, the NNCK Blues Band, Dan Graham, Loren Connors, and Electrophilia with Jutta Koether & Steven Parrino. In 2008 and 2018, the gallery and Matthew Marks Gallery organized "Painting: Now and Forever", a large-scale, ongoing survey of contemporary painting, covering 10 years each.

Greene Naftali has been featured in several "top galleries" lists, in publications such as Flash Art, Modern Painters (magazine), and artnet.

== Locations ==
The gallery occupies two spaces in the West Chelsea Building at 508 W. 26th Street: an 8th-floor space, which opened in 1995 with a group exhibition including Laura Owens, and a ground floor space, which opened in 2014 with a solo exhibition by Dan Graham.

In 2016, Greene Naftali opened Greene Naftali Garage, a temporary exhibition space at 227 Leonard Street in Williamsburg, Brooklyn.

== Artists ==
Greene Naftali represents numerous living artists, including:

- Cory Arcangel (since 2019)
- Paul Chan
- Tony Cokes (since 2017)
- Aria Dean
- Rachel Harrison
- Jacqueline Humphries
- William Leavitt
- Walter Price

In the past, the gallery has worked with the following artists and estates:

- Günther Förg

== Major exhibitions ==
- Tell Everyone, October 12 - November 12, 1995. The inaugural exhibition featuring work by Blake Rayne and Laura Owens, among others.
- Broken Home, May 3 - June 7, 1997. The gallery curated the group exhibition, Broken Home (1997), which was recreated in 2007 at the Rose Art Museum and featured Robert Gober, Vito Acconci, Felix Gonzalez-Torres, Dan Graham, and Franz West.
- Michael Krebber, Here It Is: The Painting Machine, October 11 - November 8, 2003.
- Painting Now & Forever Part II, July 3 - August 15, 2008. Originally coordinated by gallerists Pat Hearn and Matthew Marks, Greene Naftali began exhibiting the "Painting Now & Forever" exhibition series in 2008, its second iteration. The show included the work of Kai Althoff, Cosima von Bonin, Katharina Fritsch, Isa Genzken, Daan van Golden, Wade Guyton, Richard Hawkins, Mary Heilmann, Charline von Heyl, Sergej Jensen, Mike Kelley, Ellsworth Kelly, Karen Kilimnik, Martin Kippenberger, Michael Krebber, Laura Owens, Blinky Palermo, R.H. Quaytman, Josh Smith, Reena Spaulings, Paul Thek, Anne Truitt, Christopher Wool, and Katharina Wulff, among others.
- Paul Chan, Sade for Sade's Sake, October 22 - December 5, 2009.
- Rachel Harrison, The Help, May 4 - June 16, 2012.
- Dan Graham, Design For Showing Rock Videos, September 9 - October 4, 2014. The first exhibition in the gallery's ground floor space.
- Jacqueline Humphries, October 27 - December 16, 2017.

In 2022, Greene Naftali held a voter-registration drive for the duration of a Paul Chan exhibition; those who signed up received an original drawing Chan made “as a gesture of appreciation for affirming the basic and inalienable right to vote in America.”
