= Amy Yao =

American visual artist (born 1977)

Amy Yao (born June 1977, Los Angeles, California) is a musician, curator, and contemporary visual artist making work in many different mediums informed by ideas of waste, consumption, and identity. She is represented by 47 Canal in New York City. Yao is a lecturer in visual arts at Princeton University in New Jersey. Her sister Wendy Yao was proprietor of Ooga Booga art boutique and bookstore in Los Angeles.

== Music ==
In 1993, Yao and her sister Wendy were founding members of Emily's Sassy Lime, an all-Asian American teenage riot grrrl trio from Southern California. The band dissolved in 1997. They all played multiple instruments and switched instruments during performances. Yao has been involved over the years with several different bands, frequently collaborating with Tobi Vail.

== Art ==
Yao received a Bachelor of Fine Arts from Art Center College of Design in California in 1999 and a Master of Fine Arts from Yale University in Connecticut in 2007. Yao co-founded contemporary art gallery China Art Objects Galleries in 1999 with other graduates of Art Center.

Yao has exhibited at the Whitney Museum of American Art (Eckhaus Latta: Possessed), MoMA PS1 (Greater New York, 2010), 47 Canal (Weeds of Indifference), and Various Small Fires (Bay of Smokes). Yao did a TRADES artist residency in Hawaii in 2017, and she was included in the 2019 Honolulu Biennial.

Writing about Weeds of Indifference in Artforum, Chloe Wyma noted, "Refusing the readymade’s historical and contemporary postures—the cynical/ironic critique of the commodity form, the mystification of materials—Yao’s gnomic, desublimated sculptures are sometimes puzzling and not always easy to love. Nonetheless, their difficulties reflect honest questions: 'What is even real?' she asks, speaking of when 'the new authentic is used to eradicate what came before.'"

Amy and Wendy Yao have also collaborated on curatorial projects, including their Art Swap Meet at Andrea Zittel's High Desert Test Sites.
