= Chateau Shatto =

Contemporary art gallery in Los Angeles, California

Coordinates: 34.035195°N 118.256171°W

Château Shatto
- Established: 2014
- Location: Los Angeles
- Type: Art gallery
- Founders: Olivia Barrett & Nelson Harmon
- Website: http://chateaushatto.com/

Château Shatto is a contemporary art gallery in downtown Los Angeles, California directed by co-founder Olivia Barrett.

== Gallery history ==
Château Shatto opened in downtown Los Angeles in July 2014, founded by Olivia Barrett and Nelson Harmon. The gallery presents solo and group shows, exhibiting a range of artists from emerging to established including: Judy Fiskin, Sydney de Jong, John McLaughlin, Frank J. Thomas, Audrey Wollen, Bedros Yeretzian, Fiona Connor The gallery represents: Jean Baudrillard, Body by Body, Aria Dean, Hamishi Farah, Van Hanos, Parker Ito, Helen Johnson, Jacqueline de Jong, Jonny Negron

=== Selected exhibitions ===
- Education Pig - Body by Body with Odilon Redon (July - September 2014)
- A Lil’ Taste of Cheeto in the Night - Parker Ito (January - May 2015)
- Jean Baudrillard - (December 2015 - February 2016)
- "Ma" - curated by Fiona Connor - (December 2016 - January 2017)
- Late American Paintings - Van Hanos - (October - November 2017)
- In Order to Pass: Films from 1982-1995 - Chris Kraus - (March - May 2018) - prepared in collaboration with filmmaker Lane Stewart
- Small Map of Heaven - Jonny Negron - (July – September 2018)
