= Horse and Rider (Ray) =

Sculpture by Charles Ray

- The sculpture outside the Art Institute of Chicago, 2015
- Artist: Charles Ray
- Year: 2014
- Location: Chicago, Illinois, U.S.

Horse and Rider is a 2014 sculpture by American artist Charles Ray. As of June 2015, the equestrian self-portrait was installed in the Art Institute of Chicago's South McCormick Courtyard, in the U.S. state of Illinois. The work is part of "Charles Ray: Sculpture 1997–2014".

In 2019, Glenstone, a private museum located in Potomac, Maryland, began displaying Horse and Rider. Glenstone also exhibits several other works by Ray.

== See also ==
- 2014 in art
- Fountain of the Great Lakes
- List of public art in Chicago
