= Paul Schimmel (curator) =

American art curator (born 1954)

Paul Schimmel (born 1954) is an American curator of contemporary art based in Los Angeles. Schimmel served as the chief curator of The Museum of Contemporary Art, Los Angeles (MOCA), from 1990 until 2012, where he organized numerous exhibitions. From 2013 through 2017, he was a vice president and partner with the art gallery Hauser & Wirth and co-founder of Hauser Wirth & Schimmel in Los Angeles. In late February 2017, Schimmel departed from the Hauser & Wirth enterprise, including Hauser Wirth & Schimmel in Los Angeles, with no public comment on his behalf.

== Early life and education ==
Schimmel was born in 1954 in New York City. His father, Stuart Schimmel, collected rare books, focusing on forgeries and publications from the Ashendene Press; he was also a member of the Grolier Club. His uncle, Herbert Schimmel, collected art and antiquities, focusing on Art Nouveau furniture, as well as works by Henri de Toulouse-Lautrec. Schimmel attended Syracuse University from 1972 until 1975, graduating with a BFA from the selective studies program in studio art, art history, and museum studies. During this time, he also interned at the Whitney Museum of American Art and René Block Gallery in New York. Schimmel attended the Institute of Fine Arts at New York University from 1977 until 1981. In 2013, San Francisco Art Institute granted him an honorary Doctorate of Fine Arts.

== Early career ==
In 1974, Schimmel was appointed to the position of assistant curator at the Contemporary Arts Museum, Houston (CAMH). There he worked closely with the museum's director, James Harithas, with whom he had studied while at Syracuse University. Mentored by Harithas, Schimmel was eventually promoted to senior curator, organizing several exhibitions for CAMH along the way, including American Narrative/Story Art: 1967–1977; Terry Allen: Juárez Series; and James Surls: Recent Drawings (co-organized with Harithas).

In 1981, Schimmel was named chief curator/curator of exhibitions and collections at the Newport Harbor Art Museum (now Orange County Museum of Art). At age 27, he was the youngest chief curator in the museum's history. During his eight-year tenure, he sharpened the museum's focus on contemporary California art, bringing works by John Altoon, John Baldessari, Chris Burden, Vija Celmins, Robert Irwin, Edward Kienholz, David Park, Charles Ray, Allen Ruppersberg, and James Turrell into the permanent collection. He also established The Newport Biennial and New California Artist Series, which brought attention to emerging artists in the region and exhibited their works alongside those of established national and international artists.

Schimmel's exhibitions for Newport Harbor Art Museum include Action/Precision: The New Direction in New York, 1955–60; The Interpretive Link: Abstract Surrealism into Abstract Expressionism, Works on Paper 1938–48; Flemish Expressions: Twentieth Century Representational Painting; Chris Burden: A Twenty-Year Survey; The Figurative Fifties: New York Figurative Expressionism; Gunther Forg: Painting/Sculpture/Installation; Objectives: The New Sculpture; and Tony Cragg: Sculpture 1975–1990.

== Years at MOCA ==
In 1990, Schimmel was appointed chief curator of The Museum of Contemporary Art, Los Angeles (MOCA). During Schimmel's tenure, MOCA's collection grew from 987 objects at the time of its founding to 6,735 objects at the time of Schimmel's departure in 2012. Under his leadership, the museum acquired works by artists such as Diane Arbus, John Baldessari, Chris Burden, Marlene Dumas, Robert Gober, Jasper Johns, Mike Kelley, Paul McCarthy, Bruce Nauman, Charles Ray, Jason Rhoades, Nancy Rubins, Edward Ruscha, Franz West and Gregor Schneider. While at MOCA, Schimmel continued to spotlight trends in contemporary California art. His 1992 exhibition Helter Skelter: L.A. Art in the 1990s proved to be a “game-changer,” bringing the work of many young Los Angeles artists to international attention for the first time under the umbrella of themes of alienation, dispossession, and violence. Under the Big Black Sun: California Art 1974–1981 examined the proliferation of diverse and often overlooked art practices in California through the lens of the Nixon era's political climate. In addition, he organized solo exhibitions of work by Los Angeles–based artists Laura Owens and Charles Ray.

In June 2012, amid highly publicized internal turmoil at the museum, Schimmel resigned from MOCA, finishing work on the exhibition Destroy the Picture: Painting the Void, 1949–1962 as an independent curator. On the occasion of his resignation, the museum's Board of Trustees named an exhibition space at the Geffen Contemporary branch of the museum in his honor.

== Hauser Wirth & Schimmel ==
In May 2013, Hauser & Wirth announced that Schimmel had joined the international gallery as a partner along with plans to open a new contemporary art space in Los Angeles, Hauser Wirth & Schimmel, which opened in 2016. Also in 2013, Schimmel organized the exhibition Re-View: Onnasch Collection for Hauser & Wirth, which opened in their London galleries and later traveled to their New York location. In February 2017, it was announced by Hauser & Wirth that Schimmel was no longer with the organization.

== Impact and influence ==
Schimmel is known for his close working relationships with artists. In an interview with Charles Desmarais, he remarked, “Boy, you want to poison the well, you start putting curators in front! If you make them the ones that are leading the pack of dogs, you're going to follow the scent right into a bog! Whereas, if you stick with artists—and that's my total and simple mantra—if you stick with artists, it will keep you moving forward. Not every day in the right direction, but overall in the right direction.” Schimmel served as a co-director and chair of the Mike Kelley Foundation for the Arts.

In addition to championing California art and artists, Schimmel is best known for organizing large-scale, speculative exhibitions that examine overlooked tendencies in art or the interstitial periods between established art movements. He has been particularly focused on art of the postwar era, especially Abstract Expressionism, Pop, and early performance art. In a 2005 interview, described his “interest in connecting different elements, and crossing boundaries through very large-scale thematic exhibitions that define a very specific aspect of who we are culturally.”

== Awards ==
Exhibitions organized by Schimmel have won many awards, including seven from the International Association of Art Critics (AICA): Best Thematic Museum Show Nationally, Destroy the Picture: Painting the Void, 1949-1962; Best Monographic Museum Show Nationally, Robert Rauschenberg: Combines; Best Exhibition and Best Catalogue, Out of Actions: Between Performance and the Object, 1949–1979; Best Photography Exhibition, Sigmar Polke Photoworks: When Pictures Vanish; Best Catalogue, Hand-Painted Pop: American Art in Transition, 1955–62; and Best Exhibition, The Interpretive Link: Abstract Surrealism into Abstract Expressionism, Works on Paper, 1938–1948. In 2005, Robert Rauschenberg: Combines won two awards from the Association of Art Museum Curators (AAMC): Outstanding Exhibition in the Pacific Mountain Time Zone and Outstanding Book. In 1990, California State University, Fullerton, awarded Schimmel the Museum Studies Program Lifetime Achievement Award. He received the Award for Curatorial Excellence from the Center for Curatorial Studies at Bard College in 2001.
