= Victor Estrada (artist) =

American artist

- Born: 1956 (age 69–70); Burbank, California
- Education: Pasadena's Art Center College of Design
- Notable work: Baby/Baby (sculpture)

Victor Estrada (born 1956, Burbank, California, United States) is an American artist living and working in Los Angeles.

== Education ==
Estrada received his MFA, in 1988, as well as his BFA, in 1986, from Pasadena's Art Center College of Design. He also attended Texas Tech University, and the University of Texas at El Paso.

== Exhibitions ==
Estrada was included in the 1992 exhibition Helter Skelter: L.A. Art in the 1990s at the Museum of Contemporary Art, Los Angeles's Temporary Contemporary location, where his sculpture Baby/Baby, a 30-foot-long urethane-foam sculpture of reclining figures conjoined by an enormous phallus, caught critics' attention. His work was mentioned in nearly every review of the controversial exhibition, with the Los Angeles Times calling it "a powerful, monumentally theatrical sculpture", and Time (magazine) critic Robert Hughes, in a scathing review of the exhibition, granted Estrada's sculpture faint praise for its "authenticity".

Solo exhibitions of Estrada's work have been held at the Santa Monica Museum of Art, Shoshana Wayne Gallery in Los Angeles, Friedrich Petzel Gallery in New York, and Richard Telles Gallery in Los Angeles.

== Collections ==
Estrada's work is in the collections of the Brooklyn Museum of Art and the Museum of Contemporary Art, Los Angeles.
