= Fiona Connor =

New Zealand artist (born 1981)

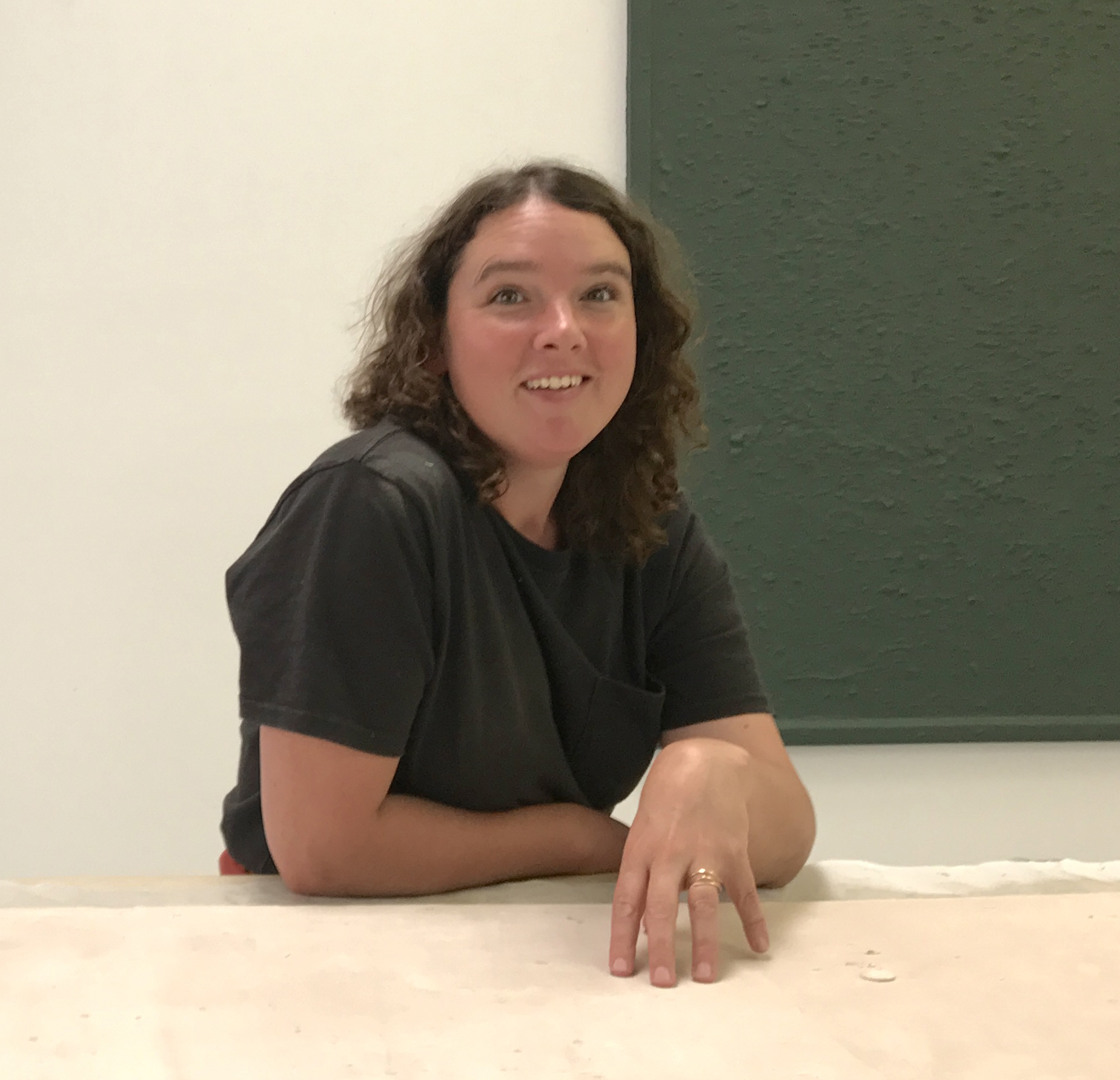
- Fiona Connor in her Los Angeles studio, August 2013
- Born: 1981 (age 44–45); Auckland, New Zealand
- Education: Elam School of Fine Arts, University of California, San Diego, University of Barcelona, California Institute of the Arts.
- Known for: Sculpture

Fiona Connor (born 1981) is a visual artist from New Zealand, currently based in Los Angeles.

== Education ==
Fiona Connor was born in 1981 in Auckland, New Zealand. In 2004 she graduated from the Elam School of Fine Arts with a BFA/BA. She has also studied at the University of California, San Diego and University of Barcelona and has an MFA from the California Institute of the Arts. She is currently based in Los Angeles.

== Work ==
Connor often replicates everyday objects in her sculptural installations. Simulacra of public noticeboards, drinking fountains, outdoor furniture, doors and so on draw attention to these often overlooked forms of civic infrastructure. She also has an ongoing collaborative project with artist Michala Paludan, Newspaper Reading Club.

Connor has exhibited throughout New Zealand and internationally. Notable exhibitions include:

- Notes on the half the page, Gambia Castle, Auckland (2008), solo
- Something Transparent (please go round the back), Michael Lett, Auckland (2009), solo
- NEW10, Australian Centre for Contemporary Art (ACCA), Melbourne (2010), group
- On Forgery: is one thing better than another?, LAXART, Los Angeles (2011), group
- Prospect: New Zealand Art Now, City Gallery, Wellington (2011), group
- De-Building, Christchurch Art Gallery, Christchurch (2011), group
- Reading the map while driving, CalArts, Los Angeles (2011), solo
- Untitled (Mural Design), Dunedin Public Art Gallery, Dunedin (2012), solo
- Murals and Print, Various Small Fires, Los Angeles (2012), solo
- Made in L.A., Hammer Museum, Los Angeles (2012), group
- Bare Use, 1301PE, Los Angeles (2013), solo
- SCAPE Public Art Biennial, Christchurch (2013), group
- Wallworks, Monash University Museum of Art, Melbourne (2014), solo
- Inside Outside Upside Down: Five Contemporary New Zealand Artists, Auckland Art Gallery Toi o Tamaki (2015), group
- Stories of Almost Everyone, Hammer Museum, Los Angeles (2018), group
- Fiona Connor: Closed Down Clubs MAK Center, Los Angeles (2018) solo
- Closed for Installation, Sequence of Events, Secession, Vienna (2019) solo
- Closed for installation Fiona Connor, Sculpture Center, #4, Sculpture Center, New York (2019) solo
- Celebration of Our Enemies: Selections from the Hammer Contemporary Collection Hammer Museum, Los Angeles (2019) group
- Haunt Institute of Modern Art, Brisbane (2019) group
- Berman Board Armory Center for the Arts, Los Angeles (2019) group
- Out of Place Drill Hall Gallery, Australian National University, Canberra (2021) group
- Long Distance Maureen Paley, London (2022) solo
- Continuous Sidewalk Chateau Shatto, Los Angeles (2023) solo

Connor was a founding member of two art spaces in Auckland; Special, and Gambia Castle. She also established the project space Laurel Doody.

Connor was a finalist in the 2010 Walters Prize with her work Something Transparent (please go round the back) (first shown in 2009 at Michael Lett, Auckland).

In 2011, she received the Arts Foundation of New Zealand Award for Patronage donation from Chartwell Trust. She also received a New Work Grant in 2008 from Creative New Zealand.

Work by Connor are held in several public collections including Auckland Art Gallery and the Museum of New Zealand Te Papa Tongarewa. She is represented by Coastal Signs in Auckland, New Zealand and Maureen Paley in London.
