= Liz Larner =

American installation artist and sculptor

Liz Larner (born 1960) is an American installation artist and sculptor living and working in Los Angeles.

== Early life and education ==
Larner was born in Sacramento, California in 1960. In 1985, she received a Bachelor of Fine Arts degree from the California Institute of Arts in Valencia, California, where she studied with John Baldessari.

== Work ==
Larner's work is regarded to have much in common with the late 1960s and early 1970s sculptures of Eva Hesse and Jackie Winsor.

She discovered the materials of ceramic for her artistic practice in the late 1990s.

Larner's sculptures are approachable in human scale and idiosyncratic vision that favors personal narrative over minimal austerity.

In her early work, Larner examined issues of transformation and decay in a series of petri dish cultures that she also photographed. Her subsequent installations and sculptures address the way an object defines the space it occupies and transforms the viewer's perception of that space. Damage Control (1987) is a two-foot-square block of hazardous substances. Its list of materials includes saltpeter (an ingredient in gunpowder), ammonium nitrate (used in the Oklahoma City bombing) and TNT itself. Used to Do the Job (1987) consists of two rough-hewn cubes stacked on top of each other; the bottom one is made of solid lead, the top one of almost solid wax and paraffin - suspended within are all the ingredients needed to make a time bomb.

In 1991, Larner had an idea for a sculpture based on the two-dimensional art principal of chromostereopsis or vibrating color theory. This is an illusion whereby depth is conveyed in two-dimensional colored images, generally with complementary colors such as red and green. The sculpture, aptly named Corridor Red/Green, is Larner's attempt to bring that two-dimensional illusion into three-dimensional space. She incorporates different types of tension, between the bags on the ground holding the green cloth, and also the metal that creates the form of the red leather. Larner was intrigued to see if that same illusion of vibration or excitement could be brought out into three dimensions through the use of those materials.

For the green-and-purple 12-foot-diameter form 2001, named for the year it was made, Larner mingled a cube and a sphere so that the object appears to be in perpetual motion. Its surface, iridescent urethane paint, is similar to automotive finishes.

In 2013, the Nasher Sculpture Center revealed the plans for a newly commissioned sculpture by Larner for The University of Texas at Dallas. For her commission, Larner proposed X, a mirror-polished stainless steel sculpture to be placed in the courtyard of the new Edith O'Donnell Arts and Technology Building (ATEC).

== Exhibitions ==
Larner's work has been the subject of numerous exhibitions throughout Europe and the United States. Survey exhibitions of her work have been held at the Kunsthaus Graz, Austria (2006); the Museum of Contemporary Art, Los Angeles (2001); the Museum of Applied Arts, Vienna (1998); and the Kunsthalle Basel, Basel (1997). Her work was included in the 2006 Whitney Biennial and "Helter Skelter: L.A. Art in the 1990s" which ran from January 26, to April 26, 1992, at the Los Angeles Museum of Contemporary Art. Organized by the Public Art Fund, Larner's sculpture 2001 was installed at the Doris C. Freedman Plaza near the southeast entrance to Central Park in 2006.

In 1989, Larner was among the artists boycotting the Corcoran Gallery of Art because of the museum's cancellation of a retrospective of the work of the photographer Robert Mapplethorpe.

In 2013, Liz Larner, created two versions of a sculpture called, "X" for the Edith O'Donnell Arts and Technology Building in Texas.

In 2016, the Aspen Art Museum (AAM) hosted a solo show of Larner's work, surveying her ceramic work from since 2011.

In May 2019, Regen Projects hosted Larner's solo exhibition, "As Below, So Above."

Larner is represented by Regen Projects in Los Angeles and the Tanya Bonakdar Gallery in New York City.

== Collections ==
Larner's work is in the collection of the Los Angeles County Museum of Art; the San Francisco Museum of Modern Art; the Museum of Contemporary Art, Chicago; Museum of Contemporary Art, San Diego; Hammer Museum, Los Angeles; Museum of Contemporary Art, Los Angeles, Whitney Museum of American Art, New York; Stedelijk Museum, Amsterdam; and the Smithsonian Museum, Washington, DC, among others.

Liz Larner has a collection in DESTE Foundation, which is located in Athens, Greece.

== Recognition ==
In 1999 Larner won a Guggenheim Fellowship. In 2002 she received the Lucelia Artist Award from the Smithsonian American Art Museum.

In 2005, Liz Larner received the Pacific Design Center starts of design award.

In 2000, Liz Larner received the Anonymous was a woman award.

in 2014, Liz Larner received Nancy Graves Foundation grant.

in 2002, Liz Larner received Lucelia Artist Award.

== Materials use ==
Larner uses anything from "fiberglass, crystals, paper, clay, aluminum, steel, rubber, epoxy, mirror, cloth, and even bacteria" to make and design her artwork

In the 1980s she became known for works incorporating organic matter, gelatinous substances and other materials such as her own saliva.
