= Jacqueline Humphries =

American artist (born 1960)

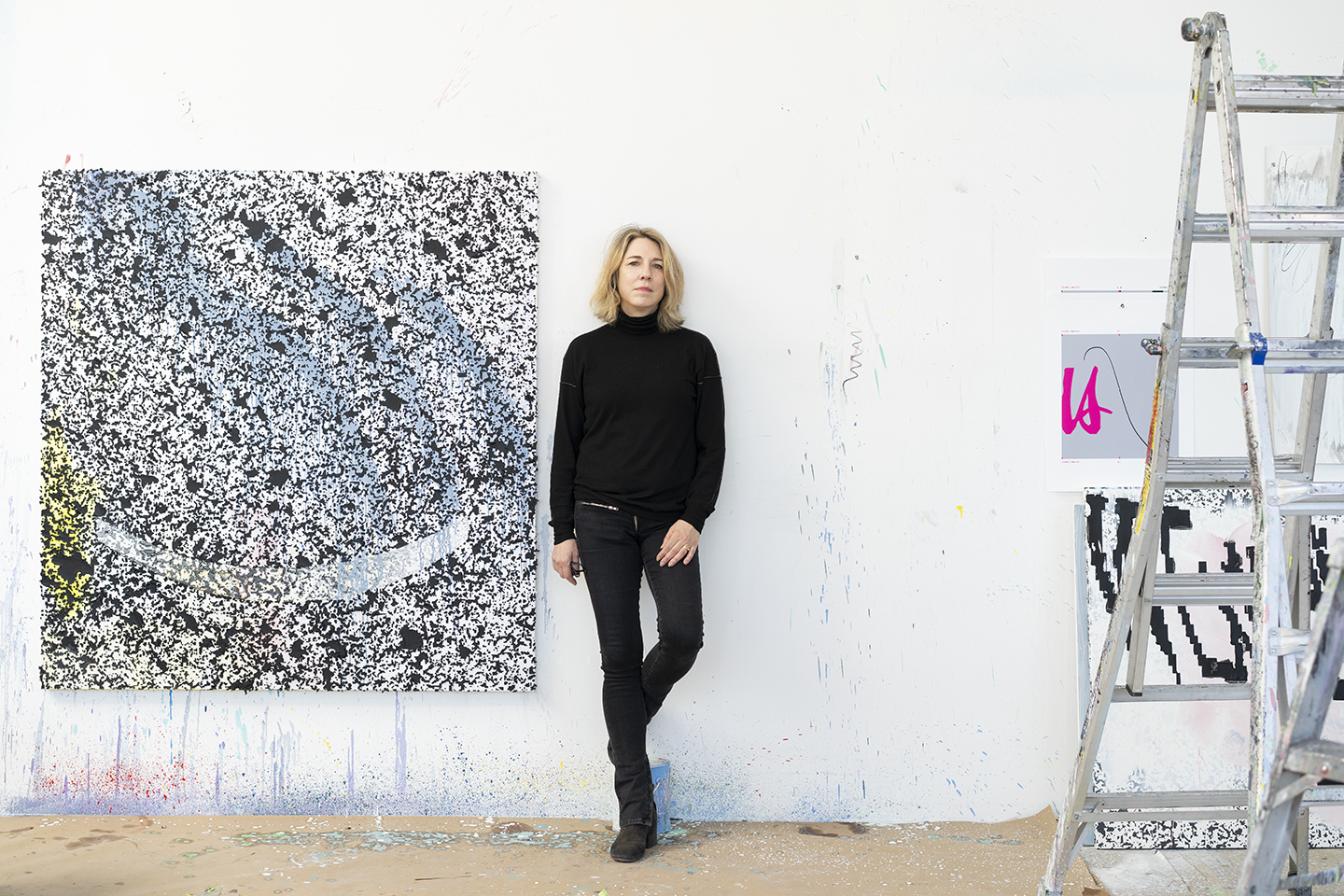
- Born: November 17, 1960 (age 65); New Orleans, Louisiana, U.S.
- Education: BFA
- Alma mater: Parsons School of Design
- Occupations: Contemporary artist, painter
- Employer: Greene Naftali Gallery
- Children: 1

Jacqueline Humphries (born November 17, 1960, in New Orleans) is an American abstract painter married to Tony Oursler. She is known for her large-scale paintings that reference the history of abstraction, combining traditional painterly techniques with contemporary technologies. She has used metallic silver pigment to suggest the glow of a cinema screen, and has incorporated emoticons, emoji, kaomoji, and CAPTCHA tests into recent works that draw on digital communication. Other paintings are produced by scanning her earlier canvases, translating them into ASCII character code, and using custom laser-cut stencils of the resulting images as the basis for new paintings. Humphries lives and works in New York City, where she is represented by Greene Naftali Gallery.

== Work ==
Humphries' work has been included in major exhibitions in the United States and internationally, including the Venice Biennale (2022) and the Whitney Biennial (2014). She was the subject of a major one-person survey exhibition at the Wexner Center for the Arts, Columbus, Ohio, in 2021. Her Black Light paintings were shown in a solo exhibition at Dia Bridgehampton, New York in 2019, a body of work which she had previously exhibited at NYEHAUS in 2005. John Kelsey described this exhibition in Artforum as "the most memorable painting show in New York".

Humphries's first comprehensive solo presentation at a United States museum took place at the Carnegie Museum of Art, Pittsburgh in 2015, and later travelled to the Contemporary Arts Center (New Orleans).

Her work is in the permanent collections of the Museum of Modern Art, New York; Metropolitan Museum of Art, New York; Art Institute of Chicago; and Tate Modern, London.

== Early life and education ==
Humphries graduated from Parsons School of Design in 1985, receiving a BFA in Fine Arts. She attended the Independent Study Program at the Whitney Museum of American Art from 1985 to 1986.

== Career ==
Humphries serves as the Vice Chairperson of the board of directors at The Kitchen (art institution), one of New York City's oldest nonprofit alternative art centers. In 2020, she co-curated an exhibition with fellow board member Wade Guyton to celebrate The Kitchen's fifty-year anniversary. The exhibition featured fifty artists including Joan Jonas, Ralph Lemon, and Laurie Anderson. Previously, Humphries served as a board member at Participant Inc., an educational corporation and not-for-profit alternative art space founded in 2001.

== Solo exhibitions ==
- Greene Naftali Gallery, New York, 1995.
- Greene Naftali Gallery, New York, 1997.
- Greene Naftali Gallery, New York, 1999.
- Greene Naftali Gallery, New York, 2001.
- NYEHAUS, New York, 2005.
- Williams College Museum of Art, Massachusetts, 2006.
- Greene Naftali Gallery, New York, 2006.
- Stuart Shave/Modern Art, London, 2007.
- Jensen Gallery, Auckland, New Zealand, 2007.
- Greene Naftali Gallery, New York, 2009.
- Stuart Shave/Modern Art, London, 2010.
- Greene Naftali Gallery, New York, 2012.
- Stuart Shave/Modern Art, London, 2014.
- Carnegie Museum of Art, Pittsburgh, 2015.
- Greene Naftali Gallery, New York, 2015.
- Contemporary Arts Center (New Orleans), New Orleans, 2015.
- Galerie Gisela Capitain, Cologne, 2016.
- Crown Point Press, San Francisco, 2016.
- Greene Naftali Gallery, New York, 2017.
- Stuart Shave/Modern Art, London, 2018.
- Dia Bridgehampton, New York, 2019.
- Galerie Gisela Capitain, Cologne, 2020.
- Wexner Center for the Arts, Columbus, 2021.
- Greene Naftali Gallery, New York, 2022.
- Aspen Art Museum, Aspen, Colorado 2025.

== Monographs ==
- Jacqueline Humphries: Neiman Marcus (Greene Naftali, 2022)
- Jacqueline Humphries (Lund Humphries, 2022)
- Jacqueline Humphries: jHΩ1:) (Wexner Center for the Arts, 2022)
- Jacqueline Humphries (Koenig, 2014)
- Jacqueline Humphries: Black Light Paintings (Foundation 2021, 2005)
- Jacqueline Humphries: Malerei Paintings (Kunsthalle Wilhelmshaven, 2000)

== Public collections ==
Humphries' work is held in the following public collections, among others:

- Albright-Knox Art Gallery, Buffalo
- Art Institute of Chicago, Chicago
- Museum of Fine Arts, Boston
- Museum Brandhorst, Munich
- Cincinnati Art Museum, Cincinnati
- Berardo Collection Museum, Lisbon
- Columbus Museum of Art, Columbus
- Dallas Museum of Art, Dallas
- Hessel Museum of Art, Annandale-on-Hudson, New York
- Hirshhorn Museum and Sculpture Garden, Washington, D.C.
- Hood Museum of Art, Dartmouth College, Hanover
- The Metropolitan Museum of Art, New York
- Museum of Modern Art, New York
- Parrish Art Museum, Water Mill
- San Francisco Museum of Modern Art, San Francisco
- Tate, London
- Whitney Museum of American Art, New York
