= Midway Contemporary Art =

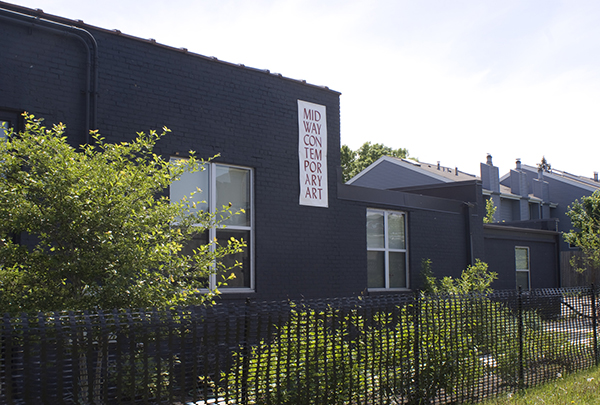
- Midway Contemporary Art in 2010
- Formation: January 2001; 25 years ago
- Founder: John Rasmussen; John Ballinger
- Legal status: Nonprofit
- Purpose: Arts
- Location(s): 1509 Marshall St NE; Minneapolis, Minnesota
- Coordinates: 45.003120°N 93.270940°W
- Website: midwayart.org

Midway Contemporary Art is a non-profit arts organization located in the Sheridan neighborhood of Minneapolis, Minnesota. Both its gallery and research library are free and open to the public.

== History ==
Midway Contemporary Art was founded in January 2001 by John Ballinger and John Rasmussen. Part of its mission is to promote emerging and underrepresented artists. Rasmussen is the current Executive Director.

Originally located in Saint Paul's Midway neighborhood, the gallery moved to the Marcy Homes neighborhood in January 2006. Midway Contemporary started the Midway Contemporary Art Library in 2007. The gallery hosts five exhibitions during the year in addition to film screenings and lectures.

Midway Contemporary Art is funded through public and private foundations, individuals, and governmental support. The organization also hosts two annual fundraiser events. During the annual Monster Drawing Rally fundraiser, dozens of local artists gather to produce live drawings which are sold upon completion.

Curator Chris Sharp of Mexico City-based project space Lulu named Midway Contemporary among his inspirations, citing its consistent quality and contributions to the local and international scenes.

== Selected exhibitions ==
- Nick Mauss: Perforations, September 16 - November 5, 2011
- Its chiming in Normaltown, Sue Tompkins, September 7-October 20, 2012
- Exploring Compositional Epistemologies, January 16 - February 14, 2015
- Can’t Reach Me There, July 30 – October 3, 2015
