= Jakob Kudsk Steensen =

Danish collaborative artist

Jakob Kudsk Steensen (b. 1987 in Køge, Denmark) is a Danish collaborative artist who works on telling immersive environmental stories through 3D animation and sound.

== Life and work ==
Jakob Kudsk Steensen was already involved in video games in his youth, preferably those in which architectural or natural landscapes had to be created. He studied at the University of Aarhus, where he initially focused on painting, but soon shifted his focus to art and new media. In 2014 he obtained a master's degree in Art History from the University of Copenhagen and then a master's degree in Fine Art from Central Saint Martins University of Arts in London.

He uses current developments in photography and computer games to create multidimensional worlds that relate to the natural environment and make ecosystems tangible through the senses. By collaborating with biologists, composers and writers, among others, he creates poetic interpretations of hidden natural phenomena. After intensive research (including with linguists and musicians) he mostly uses macro photogrammetry, which he implements in 3D animations, so that the work of art can later make several layers of a newly generated, very complex landscape structure visible.

His extensive exhibition projects are created in collaboration, which is important to the artist to point out by mentioning the collaborators in the publications and next to the installations.

After a six-year stay in New York, he has been living in Berlin since 2019, where he has had success with his project Berl.Berl. (31,000 visitors).

== Selection of solo exhibitions ==
- 2017 Times Square Arts, New York "Terratic Animism"
- 2018 Museum Tranen, Hellerup, Denmark "Re-Animated"
- 2019 Serpentine Gallery, London "The Deep Listener"
- 2020 Serpentine Gallerie, London "Catharsis"
- 2021 Nordic Embassies, Berghain, Berlin "Berl-Berl"
- 2022 ARoS Aarhus Art Museum, Aarhus, Denmark "Berl-Berl"
- 2023 Teylers Museum, Haarlem, Netherlands „Beyond the Glacier”
- 2024 Hamburger Kunsthalle "The Ephemeral Lake"
- 2025 Fondation Louis Vuitton Paris, France "THE SONG TRAPPER (2025)"
- 2025 Cisternerne Copenhagen, Denmark "Psychosphere"
- 2026 Fondation Phi Montreal, Canada "Otherworlds"
- 2026 Museum of Modern Art, New York, New York "Wetland"
