= Rachel Harrison (artist) =

American visual artist (born 1966)

- Born: 1966 (age 59–60); New York City
- Known for: Sculpture

Rachel Harrison (born 1966) is an American visual artist known for her sculpture, photography, and drawing. Her work often combines handmade forms with found objects or photographs, bringing art history, politics, and pop culture into dialogue with one another. She has been included in numerous exhibitions in Europe and the US, including the Venice Biennale (2003 and 2009), the Whitney Biennial (2002 and 2008) and the Tate Triennial (2009). Her work is in the collections of major museums such as The Museum of Modern Art, New York; Metropolitan Museum of Art, New York; Hirshhorn Museum and Sculpture Garden, Washington, D.C.; and Tate Modern, London; among others. She lives and works in New York.

== Early life ==
Harrison was born in 1966 in New York City. Her mother was born in New Jersey and her father was born in Brooklyn, New York. Her parents were both of Polish and Russian Jewish descent. In 1989 Harrison earned a Bachelor of Arts degree with Honors from Wesleyan University, where she first enrolled as an anthropology major but later switched to fine art, studying under the sculptor Jeffrey Schiff and the composer Alvin Lucier.

== Career ==
Sunday Morning (2001) at the Baltimore Museum of Art in 2022

Harrison's early work is characterized by a provisional use of everyday materials, often responding directly to the architectural context in which it was situated. In 1996, she had her first solo exhibition, titled Should home windows or shutters be required to withstand a direct hit from an eight-foot-long two-by-four shot from a cannon at 34 miles an hour, without creating a hole big enough to let through a three-inch sphere?, at Arena Gallery, New York. Here Harrison covered the parlor of a Brooklyn brownstone with imitation-wood paneling, small sculptures, cans of peas, and photographs of green trash bags that came from a single contact sheet. The title of the show was taken from the first sentence of a news article the artist read about the politics of insurance codes and natural disasters, following the devastation of Hurricane Andrew in Florida.

In 2001, Harrison's exhibition Perth Amboy opened at her New York gallery, Greene Naftali. The exhibition presented a series of 21 photographs that she took the previous year of an apparition of the Virgin Mary that allegedly manifested in the second-story window of a house in Perth Amboy, New Jersey, alongside installation components. Roberta Smith described the exhibition in the New York Times as "an effective meditation on vision, belief and the search for the self." Perth Amboy was acquired by The Museum of Modern Art in 2011 and was exhibited in 2016.

Harrison's 2007 exhibition If I Did It comprised ten sculptures named after famous men such as Claude Lévi-Strauss, Al Gore, and Alexander the Great, and a series of 57 photographs titled Voyage of the Beagle in which the artist documented a range of three-dimensional objects, from sculptures to display mannequins. The sculptures in If I Did It are characterized by the collision between abstract, brightly colored forms and found or store-bought consumer objects. For the critic John Kelsey, Harrison's sculpture of this period “sets itself up as a sort of switching station where cultural materials and meanings are violently disconnected and recombined.” The works in If I Did It were first shown in New York and then traveled to Migros Museum in Switzerland and Kunsthalle Nürnberg in Germany. The exhibition and its accompanying catalog are titled after O. J. Simpson’s “ill-fated memoir” of the same name.

Harrison often draws from popular culture and celebrity in her work, placing those references alongside art-historical ones. For instance, in her 2012 exhibition The Help (which shared a title with a Hollywood movie), the pieces shown featured references to the Brian de Palma film Scarface and the singer Amy Winehouse, as well as to artists like Alice Neel, Pablo Picasso, and Marcel Duchamp. In 2013, Harrison received her first public art commission for the sculpture Moore to the Point in Dallas, part of the Nasher Sculpture Center's Nasher XChange exhibition. The work points to and frames the existing Henry Moore sculpture Three Forms Vertebrae, installed near Dallas City Hall. Harrison's intervention calls attention to how the public interacts with works of public art.

In 2009, the Hessel Museum of Art at Bard College presented Consider the Lobster, the first major survey exhibition of Harrison's work. It included four room-sized installations, a series of individual sculptures, and a gallery devoted to video. The exhibition traveled, with altered titles and checklists, to Portikus, Frankfurt (under the title HAYCATION), and Whitechapel Gallery, London (as Conquest of the Useless). In October 2019 Harrison was the subject of a large-scale survey exhibition at the Whitney Museum of American Art. Entitled Rachel Harrison Life Hack, the exhibition assembled over one hundred works from 1991 to the present and received numerous positive reviews. Interview Magazine called the show “less a staid re-presentation of her masterpieces and more an audacious, rambunctious artwork all in itself.” Hal Foster wrote in Artforum that “her work is concerned less with exposing cultural myths than with retelling them, often in a perverse way.”

== Exhibitions ==
=== Select solo exhibitions ===
- Should home windows or shutters be required to withstand a direct hit from an eight-foot-long two-by-four shot from a cannon at 34 miles an hour, without creating a hole big enough to let through a three-inch sphere?, Arena Gallery, Brooklyn, New York (1996)
- The Look of Dress-Separates, Greene Naftali, New York (1997)
- Patent Pending: Beveled Rasp Sac, Greene Naftali, New York (1999)
- Perth Amboy, Greene Naftali, New York (2001)
- Brides and Bases, Oakville Galleries, Toronto (2002)
- Currents 30: Rachel Harrison, Milwaukee Art Museum, Milwaukee (2002)
- Posh Floored as Ali G Tackles Becks, Camden Art Centre, London (2004)
- Excuse Me?, Arndt + Partner, Berlin (2004)
- Lakta/Latkas, Greene Naftali, New York (2004)
- New Work, San Francisco Museum of Modern Art, San Francisco (2004)
- Car Stereo Parkway, Transmission Gallery, Glasgow (2005)
- When Hangover becomes Form, with Scott Lyall, Contemporary Art Gallery, Vancouver; LACE, Los Angeles (2006)
- Checking the Tires, Not To Mention The Marble Nude, Galerie Christian Nagel, Köln (2006)
- If I Did It, Greene Naftali, New York (2007)
- Voyage of the Beagle, Migros Museum, Zurich (2007)
- Lay of the Land, Le Consortium, Dijon (2008)
- Sunny Side Up, Galerie Meyer Kainer, Vienna (2008)
- Consider the Lobster, Hessel Museum, Bard College, Annadale-on-Hudson (2009)
- HAYCATION, Portikus (2009)
- Conquest of the Useless, Whitechapel Gallery, London (2010)
- Asdfjkl;, Regen Projects, Los Angeles (2010)
- Double Yolk, with Scott Lyall, Galerie Christan Nagel, Antwerp (2011)
- The Help, Greene Naftali, New York (2012)
- Villeperdue, Galerie Meyer Kainer, Vienna (2013)
- Fake Titel, Kestner Gesellschaft, Hannover, Germany (2013)
- Fake Titel: Turquoise-Stained Altars for Burger Turner, S.M.A.K., Ghent, Belgium (2013)
- Who Gave You This Number?, New York University Institute of Fine Arts, New York (2014)
- Three Young Farmers, Regen Projects, Los Angeles (2015)
- Gloria: Robert Rauschenberg & Rachel Harrison, Cleveland Museum of Art (2015)
- Rachel Harrison: Perth Amboy, Museum of Modern Art, New York (2016)
- Depth Jump to Second Box, Kraupa-Tuskany Zeidler, Berlin (2016)
- Prasine, Greene Naftali, New York (2017)
- House of the Dolphins, Rat Hole Gallery, Tokyo (2018)
- Rachel Harrison Life Hack, Whitney Museum of American Art, New York (2019)
- Drawings, Greene Naftali, New York (2020)
- Scanner Pro Paintings, Galerie Meyer Kainer, Vienna (2021)
- Assorted Varieties, Corbett vs. Dempsey, Chicago (2021)
- Caution Kneeling Bus, Regen Projects, Los Angeles (2022)
- Sitting in a Room, Astrup Fearnley Museum of Modern Art, Oslo (2022)
- Bird Watching, Galerie Konrad Fischer, Berlin (2024)
- The Friedmann Equations, Greene Naftali, New York (2025)

=== Select group exhibitions ===
- New Photography 14, Museum of Modern Art, New York (1998)
- Whitney Biennial, Whitney Museum of American Art, New York (2002)
- The Structure of Survival, Dreams and Conflicts: The Dictatorship of the Viewer, 50th Venice Biennale, Arsenale di Venezia, Venice (2003)
- 54th Carnegie International, Carnegie Museum of Art, Pittsburgh (2004)
- Of Mice and Men, The 4th Berlin Biennale, KW Institute for Contemporary Art (2006)
- Whitney Biennial, Whitney Museum of American Art (2008)
- Altermodern, Tate Triennial, Tate Britain, London (2009)
- Making Worlds, 53rd Venice Biennale, Italian Pavilion, Venice (2009)
- The Original Copy: Photography of Sculptures, 1839 to Today, Museum of Modern Art, New York; Kunsthaus Zürich (2010)
- Blues for Smoke, Museum of Contemporary Art, Los Angeles; Whitney Museum of American Art, New York; Wexner Center for the Arts, Columbus, Ohio (2012)
- Nasher Xchange, Dallas City Hall Plaza, Nasher Sculpture Center, Dallas (2013)
- Painting 2.0: Expression in the Information Age, Museum Brandhorst, Munich; mumok, Vienna (2015)
- Ordinary Pictures, Walker Art Center, Minneapolis (2016)
- M/D Coda, San Francisco Museum of Modern Art, San Francisco (2017)
- Faithless Pictures, Nasjonalmuseet, Oslo (2018)
- Everything Is Connected: Art and Conspiracy, Met Breuer, New York (2018)
- Public Service Announcement: Works by Eva Koťátková and Rachel Harrison, the Metropolitan Museum of Art (2018)
- Participation to Jay DeFeo : The Ripple Effect, Le Consortium, France, Dijon (2018)
- Yorkshire Sculpture International 2019, Leeds Art Gallery, Leeds, England (2019)
- Marcel Duchamp: The Barbara and Aaron Levine Collection, Hirshhorn Museum and Sculpture Garden, Washington, D.C. (2019)
- Fata Morgana, Jeu de Paume, Paris (2022)
- Stage Fright, curated by Rachel Harrison, LGDR, New York (2022)
- Before Tomorrow, Astrup Fearnley Museum of Modern Art, Oslo (2023)
- Always Being Relation: 50 Years of the Gallery at the CFA, Ezra and Cecile Zilkha Gallery, Wesleyan University, Middleton, Connecticut (2024)
- Reverberations, Museum of Contemporary Art, Los Angeles (2024)
- The Writing's on the Wall: Language and Silence in the Visual Arts, curated by Hilton Als, Hill Art Foundation, New York (2024)
- Accumulation - Strategies for Dealing with Growth and Excess, Migros Museum für Gegenwartskunst, Zurich (2025)
- Énormément bizarre: Jean Chatelus Collection, Centre Pompidou, Paris

== Public collections ==
Harrison's work can be found in a number of public institutions, including:

- Art Institute of Chicago, Chicago
- Blanton Museum of Art, The University of Texas at Austin, Austin, Texas
- Cleveland Museum of Art, Cleveland
- Hessel Museum of Art, Bard College, Annandale-on-Hudson, New York
- Hirshhorn Museum and Sculpture Garden, Washington, D.C.
- Institute of Contemporary Art, Boston
- Los Angeles County Museum of Art, Los Angeles
- Metropolitan Museum of Art, New York
- Moderna Museet, Stockholm
- Musée National d’Art Moderne, Centre Georges Pompidou, Paris
- Museum of Contemporary Art, Los Angeles
- Museum of Modern Art, New York
- Solomon R. Guggenheim Museum, New York
- Stedelijk Museum, Amsterdam
- Tate Modern, London
- Walker Art Center, Minneapolis
- Whitney Museum of American Art, New York

== Awards ==
- Herb Alpert Award in the Arts (2010)
- Calder Prize and residency (2011)
- Anonymous Was A Woman Award (2015)
- Gold List: Top Contemporary Artists of Today - 5th Edition, Int. Art Market Magazine, Tel Aviv, 2020

== Bibliography ==
- Basilico, Stefano, Rachel Harrison, and Gareth James. Currents 30: Rachel Harrison. Milwaukee: Milwaukee Art Museum, 2002.
- Munder, Heike, Ellen Seifermann, and John Kelsey. If I Did It. Zürich: Migros Museum and JRP Ringier, 2007.
- Banks, Eric, and Sarah Valdez, eds. Rachel Harrison: Museum With Walls. Annandale-on-Hudson, New York: Center for Curatorial Studies, Bard College; London: Whitechapel Gallery; Frankfurt am Main: Portikus, 2010.
- Harrison, Rachel. Abraham Lincoln. New York: Printed Matter, 2010.
- Harrison, Rachel. “Rump Steak with Onions.” Triple Canopy. Web project, 2011.
- Figner, Susanne and Martin Germann, eds. Fake Titel. Cologne: König, 2013.
- Rutland, Beau, ed. Rachel Harrison: G•L•O•R•I•A. New Haven, CT: Yale University Press, 2015.
- Sussman, Elisabeth and David Joselit. Rachel Harrison Life Hack. New York: Whitney Museum of American Art, 2019.
- Banks, Eric, ed. The Classics. New York: Greene Naftali, 2020.
- Cesarco, Alejandro, ed. Rachel Harrison / Haim Steinbach: Between Artists. New York: Art Resources Transfer, 2020.
- Harrison, Rachel. Hold Still, Henry!. Basel: Rookie Books, 2025.
