= Charles Ray (artist) =

American sculptor

- Born: 1953 (age 72–73); Chicago, Illinois
- Education: University of Iowa, Rutgers University
- Known for: Life-size fiberglass figures and monumental wood carvings
- Spouse: Silvia Gaspardo-Moro

Charles Ray (1953) is an American sculptor known for his strange and enigmatic sculptures that draw the viewer's perceptual judgments into question in jarring and unexpected ways. In 2007, Christopher Knight in the Los Angeles Times wrote that Ray's "career as an artist…is easily among the most important of the last twenty years."

== Early life and education ==
Ray was born in Chicago as the son of Helen and Wade Ray. His parents owned and ran a commercial art school which his grandmother had founded in 1916. He was the second oldest in his family and has four brothers and a sister. The family moved to Winnetka, Illinois, in 1960. Charles and his older brother, Peter, attended high school at the Catholic Marmion Military Academy in Aurora, Illinois, where their father had gone. On Saturdays he went to the Art Institute's studio program for high-school students. He earned his BFA at the University of Iowa and his MFA from Mason Gross School of the Arts at Rutgers University.

He studied sculpture at the University of Iowa School of Art and Art History with Roland Brener, who exposed Ray to many of developments of Modernist sculpture, in particular the constructivist aesthetic of artists like Anthony Caro and David Smith. He later studied with Stephen Zaima, where Ray executed many of his performance pieces in the undergraduate studio, like Plank Piece I–II.

"Caro's work was like a template; I saw it as almost platonic. The formal rules as taught by Brener were a kind of nourishment for me. The actual working in the studio was, in a sense, the expression. I was taught that the finished sculpture was maybe the end of the paragraph. Once a sculpture was completed it was critiqued and put back on to the scrap pile. This way of working taught me to think sculpturally rather than to think about sculpture. At this time in my life the historical context of high Modernism was really beyond my grasp. I saw Caro as super-contemporary. His work was, and is, so alive. It bridges the gap between the inside and outside of my mind."

Ray moved to California in 1981 where he headed the sculpture department at UCLA since.

== Work ==
Ink Box (1986)

Ray's work is difficult to classify. Style, materials, subject, presence, and scale are all variable. Critic Anne Wagner finds the consistent quality to be this: "In all his seamlessly executed objects, Ray fixates on how and why things happen, to say nothing of wondering what really does happen in the field of vision, and how such events might be remade as art." This and the level of art historical awareness behind his works has led many critics to call Ray a sculptor's sculptor. Nevertheless, his art has managed to find a large audience, thanks in part to its often striking or beguiling nature.

Family Romance (1993)

Ray recapitulated many of the developments in twentieth-century sculpture in his first show in 1971 with an installation entitled One-Stop Gallery. The show consisted of a collection of small sculptures, resting directly on floor. Some of the works, in their attention to materials, were clearly inspired by minimalist artists like Robert Morris, while two small constructed steel sculptures invoke the traditions taught by his teacher, Brener; they were even painted the same red as Caro's Early One Morning (1962, Tate Modern). One-Stop Gallery would anticipate the tone for much of Ray's work to come in its plumbing and reinterpreting of the canon of twentieth-century sculpture without having his own work appeal to any particular period or style. Initially influenced by Caro, by including his own body in his works he made them more like documented performances. In the two-part photographic work Plank Piece I–II (1973), for example, he pinned his body to the wall with a large piece of wood. In the late 1980s, Ray conceived minimalist works using ink and wire. In Ink Box (1986), a large cube is filled to the brim with ink, giving the illusion of a solid cube. Ink Line (1987) is a continuous stream of black ink traveling from a dime-size opening in the ceiling into a similar hole in the floor. In Spinning Spot (1987), a section of the floor measuring 24 inches in diameter is set spinning at 33 RPM. Consisting of a single 8.5 foot length of wire, both ends of Moving Wire (1988) protrude from the wall and are set 14 inches apart; as one end of the wire extends out from the wall at random intervals, the other retracts. For Unpainted Sculpture (1997), over the course of two years, Ray reconstructed a life-sized crashed Pontiac Grand Am (circa 1991) out of fiberglass, casting and assembling each piece to match the bent and twisted forms of the original Despite the work's title, it is painted a soft dove grey that is reminiscent of the plastic parts of model car kits.

His most labor-intensive work to date is the ten-year re-creation in Japanese cypress (Hinoki) of a fallen and rotting tree he had found in a meadow. With Hinoki (2007, Art Institute of Chicago), Ray had a mold made of a large rotting tree he found in California. He then hired a team of Japanese woodcarvers in Osaka to essentially re-carve the tree in Hinoki, a different wood than that of the original tree. In an interview with Michael Fried, Ray made it clear that the purpose of the piece was not to photorealistically carve an exact replica of the tree. "The tree had that beautiful interior that fallen logs have," he says. "It happens when bugs eat out the hard wood, so you have this hollow thing. All I knew was that I wanted to carve that, I wanted them to have a sense of that interior [of the log] because it's in there, even if normally it couldn't be seen. So that was really important. And then I became involved with the outside as well…It mattered to me that somebody had looked at it, and I wanted to make it matter to you."

Ray's critically acclaimed Firetruck (1993), a full-size aluminum, fiberglass and Plexiglas installation, has been exhibited on Madison Avenue in New York, in front of the Whitney Museum of American Art. The giant replica of a red toy firetruck was also exhibited outside the Los Angeles County Museum of Art in 2008.

In 2009, Ray installed Boy with Frog, his first outdoor commissioned work, at the Punta della Dogana, Venice. Grand in size and realized with a smooth white finish that references the important tradition of marble sculpture in Italy, it depicted a nine years old boy holding a goliath frog above the Grand Canal. The sculpture called to mind the Apollo Sauroktonos, an ancient Roman sculpture at the Musée du Louvre in Paris of a nude adolescent reaching out his arm to catch a lizard climbing a tree; and, the Boy with Thorn (Lo Spinario), a bronze statue at the Palazzo dei Conservatori, Musei Capitolini, of a seated Roman boy plucking a thorn from the sole of his foot. The statue was removed in 2013 and replaced with a lamp-post that had previously occupied the site.

In the 2014 art journal Musee Magazine, artist Slater Bradley told editor-in-chief Andrea Blanch that Ray's collaboration with fashion model Tatjana Patitz titled "The Most Beautiful Woman in the World, 1993 (for Parkett 37)" in which the supermodel was depicted as the girl next door, had achieved what social media would do decades later - but in 1993 - and called it extraordinary and genius.

Two horses (2019) at the Metropolitan Museum of Art

Ray’s first work in stone, Two Horses (2019), is a relief carved from a single block of Virginia granite and weighs more than six tons.

== Exhibitions ==
Ray had his first one-person museum exhibition in 1989 at the Newport Harbor Art Museum (now Orange County Museum of Art). His art has since been featured in numerous solo and group exhibitions in Europe and North America, including a traveling, mid-career retrospective organized by Paul Schimmel for the Museum of Contemporary Art, Los Angeles, which then traveled to the Museum of Contemporary Art, Chicago and the Whitney Museum of American Art. Other solo exhibition venues include the Institute of Contemporary Art, London; Kunsthalle Bern, Switzerland; Astrup Fearnley Museet for Moderne Kunst, Oslo, Norway; and Kunstmuseum Basel, Switzerland. He has exhibited at documenta IX (1992), Venice Biennales in 1993 and 2003, and four Whitney Biennials. In 2012, Ray participated in Lifelike, a group exhibition that originated at the Walker Art Center.

In 2015, Ray's major one-person exhibition "Charles Ray: Sculpture, 1997-2014" opened at Kunstmuseum Basel in Switzerland before moving to the Art Institute of Chicago. The Art Institute devoted the 18,000 square feet (1,700 square metres) of its second floor Modern Wing to 17 pieces.

In 2022, the Metropolitan Museum of Art staged the major solo exhibition "Charles Ray: Figure Ground." 2022 also saw the opening of solo shows at the Centre Georges Pompidou and the Pinault Collection at the Bourse de Commerce in Paris.

== Notable works in public collections ==
- Plank Piece I, II (1973), The Broad, Los Angeles; Glenstone, Potomac, Maryland; Museum of Contemporary Art, Los Angeles; Museum of Modern Art, New York; and Tate, London
- How a Table Works (1986), Museum of Contemporary Art, Los Angeles
- Ink Box (1986), Orange County Museum of Art, Costa Mesa, California
- Self Portrait (1990), Orange County Museum of Art, Costa Mesa, California
- Boy (1992), Art Institute of Chicago
- Fall '91 (1992), The Broad, Los Angeles; and Glenstone, Potomac, Maryland
- Oh! Charley, Charley, Charley... (1992), Rubell Museum, Miami
- Family Romance (1993), Museum of Modern Art, New York; and Pinault Collection, Paris
- Firetruck (1993), The Broad, Los Angeles
- Unpainted Sculpture (1997), Walker Art Center, Minneapolis
- Chicken (2007), Glenstone, Potomac, Maryland
- Father Figure (2007), Glenstone, Potomac, Maryland
- Hinoki (2007), Art Institute of Chicago
- Boy with Frog (2009), Philadelphia Museum of Art
- Sleeping Woman (2012), Glenstone, Potomac, Maryland; and San Francisco Museum of Modern Art
- Young Man (2012), Pinault Collection, Paris
- Horse and rider (2014), Glenstone, Potomac, Maryland
- Huck and Jim (2014) (an edition of 2) Art Institute of Chicago
- Two horses (2019), Metropolitan Museum of Art, New York
- Return to the one (2020), Glenstone, Potomac, Maryland

== Selected bibliography ==
=== Books on Charles Ray ===
- Bankowsky, Jack, Thomas Crow, Nicholas Cullinan, and Michael Fried. Sculpture After Sculpture: Fritsch, Ray, Koons. Ostfildern, Germany: Hatje Cantz, 2014.
- Bürgi, Berhand, Douglas Druik, Michael Fried, and Charles Ray. Charles Ray: Sculpture, 1997 - 2014. Ostfildern, Germany: Hatje Cantz, 2014.
- Ray, Charles. Log. Los Angeles: Self-published, 2009.
- Ray, Charles. Charles Ray. Los Angeles: Museum of Contemporary Art, 1998.
- Ray, Charles. Charles Ray. Malmö: Rooseum – Center for Contemporary Art, 1994.

=== Articles on Charles Ray ===
- Tomkins, Calvin. "Meaning Machines-The sculpture of Charles Ray" The New Yorker, May 11, 2015, pp. 54–59.
- Wagner, Anne. "Sculpture After Sculpture." Artforum. February 2015, pp. 226–227.
- Schjeldahl, Peter. "No Offense." The New Yorker. 8 March 2010, pp 80–81.
- Russeth, Andrew. "Shoeless Ray." Observer Arts. 26 November 2012. pp. B1 - B10.
- Hainley, Bruce. "Charles Ray at Regen Projects." Artforum, January 1998, 91.
- Knight, Christopher. "Charles Ray's Hinoki: A Wooden Record of Life." Los Angeles Times, May 11, 2007.
- Relyea, Lane. "Charles Ray: In the No." Artforum, September 1992, 62-66.
- Rutledge, Virginia. "Ray's Reality Hybrids." Art in America, November 1998, 96-100, 142-143.
- Wagner, Anne. "Review of 'Charles Ray' at the Museum of Contemporary Art, Los Angeles." Artforum, May 1999, 171-172.

=== Interviews with Charles Ray ===
- Self, Will. "Charles Ray." Interview. February 2013, pp 120–129; 134-135.
- Bonami, Francesco. "Charles Ray: A Telephone Conversation." Flash Art, Summer 1992, 98-100.
- Fried, Michael. "Early one Morning…" Tate Etc., Spring 2005, 50-53.
- Storr, Robert. "Anxious Spaces." Art in America, November 1998, 101-105, 143-144.

=== Writings by Charles Ray ===
- Ray, Charles. "Thinking of Sculpture as Shaped by Space." The New York Times, October 7, 2001, 34.
- __________. A Four Dimensional Being Writes Poetry on a Field with Sculptures. New York: Matthew Marks Gallery, 2006.
- __________. "1000 Words: Charles Ray Talks about Hinoki, 2007." Artforum, September 2007, 4.

== See also ==
- Horse and Rider (Ray), 2014
