= Phyllis Tuchman =

American art writer (born 1947)

Phyllis Tuchman (born 1947) is an American art historian, critic and author, with a special focus on contemporary sculptors. According to the state library of California, some of her papers are held by the Getty Archives, many of her texts have become "canonical, oft-cited references for the artists." Her review of a Mark Rothko show is included as model material in the textbook A Short Guide to Writing About Art. She is the author of Robert Motherwell: The East Hampton Years, the George Segal title of the Abbeville Modern Masters series, and has published in Artforum, Art News, artnet.com, and Art in America. She has taught at Williams College, Hunter College, and the School of Visual Arts.
