= Wendy Yao =

American musician and curator

Wendy Yao (born Los Angeles, California) is an American musician and curator.

Yao is a graduate of Stanford University, where she had a radio show and started a radio station magazine. Her sister is visual artist Amy Yao, with whom she was in the 1990s all-Asian American teenage riot grrrl trio Emily's Sassy Lime in Southern California. The Yao sisters along with friend Emily Ryan formed Emily's Sassy Lime in 1993, and the band dissolved in 1997. They all played multiple instruments and switched instruments during performances.

Yao was proprietor of Ooga Booga art boutique and bookstore in Los Angeles, which sold artists' books, zines, records, clothes by independent designers, and other artist-crafted goods and ephemera. Yao operated Ooga Booga in Los Angeles' Chinatown neighborhood for 15 years starting in 2004, and a second outpost Ooga Booga #2 within the large-scale L.A. art space 356 Mission for a few years until it closed in 2019. Yao curated art exhibits, film screenings, and music performances at these spaces. In 2017, Yao was a recipient of the White Columns/Shoot the Lobster Award for her work creating opportunities for both artists and audiences. After the storefronts closed, Yao expanded Ooga Booga into more flexible forms with pop-ups and a web presence.

Wendy and Amy Yao have also collaborated on curatorial projects, including their Art Swap Meet at Andrea Zittel's High Desert Test Sites.
