= Meg Cranston =

American artist

- Born: September 26, 1960 (age 65)
- Education: California Institute of the Arts, Kenyon College
- Known for: ASCII art; conceptual art; multimedia art; painting
- Awards: Artadia Award, Guggenheim Fellowship, Architectural Foundation of American Art in Public Places Award, COLA Artist Grant, J. Paul Getty Community Foundation Artist Grant

Meg Cranston (born 1960) is an American contemporary artist whose conceptual practice spans painting, sculpture, installation, performance, and video. Exploring how individual identity intersects with shared cultural experiences and how images, colors, and objects acquire meaning in society. She has also written on a variety of art-related topics for various publications.

== Early life and education ==
Cranston was born in Baldwin, New York. She earned a B.A. in Anthropology/Sociology from Kenyon College in Ohio in 1982. She received an MFA in Studio Art from California Institute of the Arts in 1986. She also attended the Jan van Eyck Akademie in Maastricht, The Netherlands in 1988.

== Work ==
Although she often takes personal attributes or historical events as a starting point, Cranston's work equally deals with the formal language of art and the role of the artist in helping us see the world in new ways.

She is currently the chair of fine arts at Otis College of Art and Design in Los Angeles.

She has exhibited internationally since 1988. In 1992 she was part of the Helter Skelter exhibition at MOCA, the Museum of Contemporary Art in Los Angeles, and showed at the 1993 Biennale di Venezia.

She is the recipient of numerous awards, including a New School of Social Research Faculty Development Grant, an artist grant from the Penny McCall Foundation, a Guggenheim Fellowship, a faculty research grant from the Center for Asian American Studies at UCLA, Architectural Foundation of America, an Artadia Award, an ab Art in Public Places Award, and a C.O.L.A. Individual Artist's Grant from Los Angeles Cultural Affairs.

Meg Cranston lives and works in California.

== Reviews ==
- ART IN REVIEW; Meg Cranston -- 'Magical Death'
- Meg Cranston in Frieze Magazine
- A scatter of slight gestures from Meg Cranston
