= Myriam Ben Salah =

Tunisian writer and curator

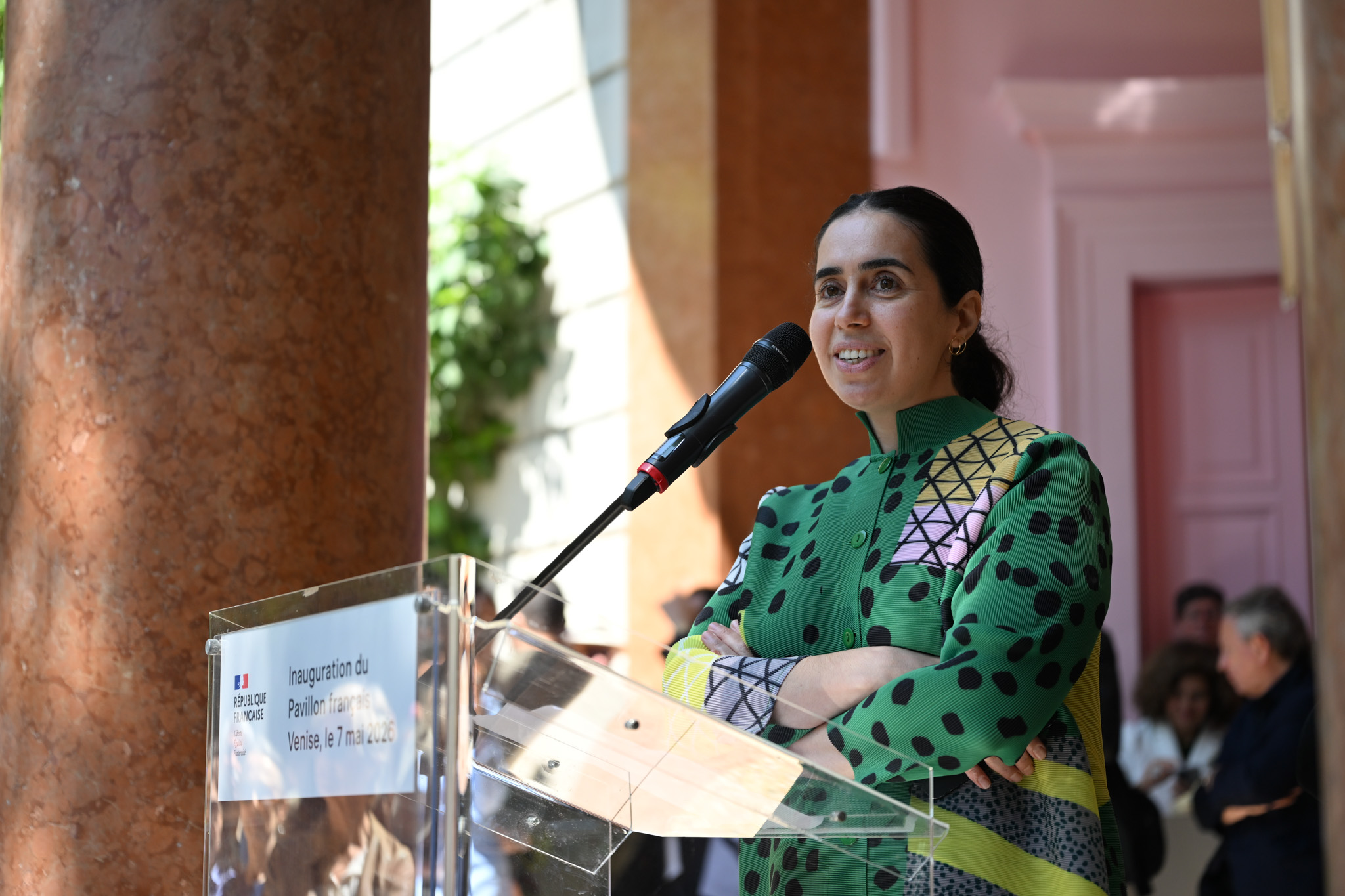
- Born: Myriam; 1985 (age 40–41); Algiers, Algeria
- Citizenship: Tunisia
- Scientific career
- Fields: exhibition curator

Myriam Ben Salah is a Tunisian curator based in Paris. She was born in 1985 in Algiers, capital of Algeria. She became the editor-in-chief of Kaleidoscope Magazine in 2016. Prior, she coordinated special projects and public programs at the Palais de Tokyo from 2009 to 2016. In 2017, Ben Salah curated I Heard You Laughing at the Gregor Staiger Gallery. She was the curator of the 10th edition of the Abraaj Group Art Prize. Ben Salah curated a collection called The Pain of Others at the Ghebaly Gallery in Los Angeles in 2018. She also edits the magazine F.A.Q.

In April 2020, it was announced that Ben Salah would become the next executive director and chief curator of the Renaissance Society at the University of Chicago.
