= Laura Owens =

American painter

- Born: 1970 (age 55–56); Euclid, Ohio, US
- Education: Rhode Island School of Design; California Institute of the Arts
- Known for: Painting, Gallery Owner

Laura Owens (born 1970) is an American painter, gallery owner and educator. She emerged in the late 1990s from the Los Angeles art scene. She is known for large-scale paintings that combine a variety of art historical references and painterly techniques. She lives and works in Los Angeles, California.

In 2013, she turned her studio work space into an exhibition space called 356 Mission, in collaboration with Gavin Brown and Wendy Yao. The 356 Mission art space closed in 2019, due to the lease ending.

In 2003 Owens had her first survey exhibition at the Museum of Contemporary Art, Los Angeles. Owens’s work has been presented in solo exhibitions at Secession, Vienna (2015); Kunstmuseum Bonn (2011); Bonnefanten Museum (2007); Kunsthalle Zürich (2006); Camden Arts Centre, London (2006); Milwaukee Art Museum (2003); Aspen Art Museum, Colorado (2003); and the Isabella Stewart Gardner Museum, (2001). Owens had a mid-career survey at the Whitney Museum Of American Art from November 2017 to February 2018.

== Early life and education ==
Owens was born in 1970 in Euclid, Ohio and raised in nearby Norwalk, Ohio. She received her B.F.A. in Painting from the Rhode Island School of Design in 1992. After graduation she moved to Los Angeles for graduate school. In 1994 she attended the Skowhegan School of Painting and Sculpture and received her M.F.A. from the California Institute of the Arts the same year.

== Work ==
In 2015, Owens made paintings based on World War II-era newspaper stereotype plates she discovered underneath the shingle siding of her Los Angeles home. Like much of her recent work, the paintings combined traditional oil paint with screen printed images digitally manipulated in Adobe Photoshop.

In addition to painting, Owens also creates artists' books. As of 2016, she teaches classes at ArtCenter College of Design.

Owen's work can be found in many public art collections including, the Art Institute of Chicago, Chicago; the Museum of Modern Art, New York; the Museum of Contemporary Art, Los Angeles, Los Angeles; the Los Angeles County Museum of Art, Los Angeles; the Guggenheim Museum in New York, New York; the Whitney Museum of American Art, New York; the Museum of Contemporary Art, Chicago, Chicago; and the Milwaukee Art Museum, Milwaukee.

Her work was included in the 2024 exhibition Making Their Mark: Works from the Shah Garg Collection at the Berkeley Art Museum and Pacific Film Archive (BAMPFA).

== Controversy ==
In January 2013, Owens exhibited 12 new paintings in a building at 356 Mission Road, across the river from Downtown Los Angeles. Owens continued to run this space, 356 Mission as an exhibition space in collaboration with Gavin Brown and Wendy Yao. In May 2018, 356 Mission closed after their 5 year lease came to an end. The bookstore Ooga Booga remains open at its original store location in Chinatown, Los Angeles.

Laura Owens and Gavin Brown have been accused of being involved with gentrification of a predominantly working-class, Hispanic neighborhood with their gallery 356 Mission in of Boyle Heights, on the east side of Los Angeles. Activists of various anti-gentrification groups have protested their galleries and exhibitions in both Los Angeles and New York City. Owens alleges protesters have bullied and threatened her, including death threats. In November 2017, she penned a public statement regarding the issues, after her mid-career survey art exhibition opening at the Whitney Museum of American Art was protested. The 356 Mission art space closed in 2019, due to the lease ending.

== Awards and honors ==
Owens was awarded the inaugural Bâloise Prize at Art Basel in 1999, received the Willard L. Metcalf Award in Art from the American Academy of Arts and Letters in 2001, and was a Guna S. Mundheim Visual Arts Fellow at the American Academy in Berlin in the spring of 2007. In 2015, she was awarded the Robert De Niro, Sr. prize for her painting practice.

== Exhibitions ==
=== Solo exhibitions ===
- 2001: Isabella Stewart Gardner Museum, Boston, Massachusetts
- 2003: Museum of Contemporary Art, Los Angeles (touring)
- 2003: Aspen Art Museum, Aspen, Colorado
- 2003: Milwaukee Art Museum, Milwaukee, Wisconsin
- 2004: The Fabric Workshop and Museum, Philadelphia
- 2006: Kunsthalle Zurich, Zurich, Switzerland
- 2006: Camden Arts Centre, London
- 2007: Bonnefantenmuseum Maastricht, The Netherlands
- 2007: American Academy studio exhibition, Berlin
- 2007: Ausstellungshalle Zeitgenossische Kunst, Munster
- 2011: Kunstmuseum Bonn, Bonn, Germany
- 2015: Secession, Vienna
- 2016: CCA Wattis Institute for Contemporary Arts, San Francisco, California
- 2017: Whitney Museum of American Art
- 2018: Dallas Museum of Art (DMA)
- 2018: Museum of Contemporary Art, Los Angeles
- 2019: Isabella Stewart Gardner Museum, Boston, Massachusetts
- 2020: House of Gaga, Mexico
- 2021: Cleveland Museum of Art, Cleveland, Ohio
- 2022: Galerie Gisela Capitain, Cologne, Germany
- 2025: Matthew Marks Gallery, New York

=== Group exhibitions ===
- 2016: La collection Thea Westreich Wagner et Ethan Wagner, Centre Georges Pompidou, Paris
- 2021: Laura Owens & Vincent van Gogh, Fondation Vincent van Gogh Arles, France
