= Charles Gaines =

Charles Gaines may refer to:

- Charles Gaines (writer) (1942–2026), American writer and outdoorsman
- Charles Gaines (artist) (born 1944), American visual artist
- Charles Gaines (American football) (born 1992), American football player
- Charles Gaines (basketball) (born 1981), American basketball player
- Charles E. Gaines (1924–2000), American politician; Illinois state representative 1975–1981

== See also ==
- Charlie Gaines (1900–1986), American jazz trumpeter and bandleader
