= Galerie Max Hetzler =

Galerie Max Hetzler is a gallery for contemporary art with locations in Berlin, Paris and London.

== History ==
The Galerie Max Hetzler was founded in Stuttgart in 1974. In 1981, the gallery presented the first exhibitions of Martin Kippenberger and Albert Oehlen. In 1983 the gallery moved to Cologne, the centre of the contemporary art scene in Germany at the time, and pursued a programme with some of the most significant German and American artists from the 80's.

From 1989 until 1992, Max Hetzler partnered with Luhring Augustine Gallery on establishing Luhring Augustine Hetzler in Los Angeles. The 4,500 square feet (420 square metres) space was located in a refurbished building at 1330 4th Street in Santa Monica.

Max Hetzler moved to Berlin in 1993, inaugurating a space in Charlottenburg in 1994. The following year, a second space opened on Zimmerstraße, next to Checkpoint Charlie. This soon became the main gallery, where exhibitions by artists from different generations took place.

In the late 1990s, Max Hetzler joined forces with Jeffrey Deitch and Anthony d'Offay to invest heavily in the costly fabrication of Jeff Koons's Celebration series at Southern California-based Carlson & Company (including his Balloon Dog and Moon series), and later, at Arnold, a Frankfurt-based company. The dealers funded the project in part by selling works to collectors before they were fabricated.

In 2006, Galerie Max Hetzler opened a space in a former light bulb factory, Osram-Höfe in Wedding, which became the main gallery in 2009. The 1,600 sqm of this industrial space hosted solo shows of Mona Hatoum, Marepe, Beatriz Milhazes, Ernesto Neto, Frank Nitsche, Michael Raedecker, Bridget Riley, Rebecca Warren, Toby Ziegler and others, as well as group shows. In 2013 the gallery celebrated its 40 years anniversary with the group show "Remember Everything" including all currently represented artists such as Glenn Brown, André Butzer, Rineke Dijkstra, Günther Förg, Mona Hatoum, Jeff Koons, Vera Lutter, Marepe, Beatriz Milhazes, Ernesto Neto, Frank Nitsche, Albert Oehlen, Yves Oppenheim, Richard Phillips, Michael Raedecker, Bridget Riley, Thomas Struth, Rebecca Warren, Christopher Wool and Toby Ziegler.

At the end of 2013 Max Hetzler left the gallery space in Berlin-Wedding and opened two new spaces in Berlin-Charlottenburg.

In May 2014, the gallery inaugurated its first location outside of Germany, in the Marais district of Paris.

In 2018 the gallery expanded further, opening a London location at 41 Dover Street in Mayfair. That year, Max Hetzler's son, Max Edouard, and Sarah Horner took over the gallery's management.

In recent years, Galerie Max Hetzler expanded its remit, taking on more contemporary artists, including shows of Richard Prince, Adam Pendleton, Edmund de Waal, Ida Ekblad and Loris Gréaud.

Most recently, the gallery has launched two new spaces in Berlin. In May 2020, Galerie Max Hetzler opened a street level gallery, in a magnificent art nouveau building at Bleibtreustraße 15/16 in the former home of pioneering German avant-garde art dealer Alfred Flechtheim (1878-1937). In November 2021, Galerie Max Hetzler inaugurated its latest space at Potsdamer Straße 77-87 with a solo exhibition by André Butzer entitled Rohe Milch.

== Artists ==
Galerie Max Hetzler today represents many contemporary artists, including:

- Ai WeiWei
- Darren Almond
- Giulia Andreani
- Matthew Barney
- Glenn Brown
- André Butzer
- Jeremy Demester
- Rineke Dijkstra
- Carroll Dunham
- Celeste Dupuy-Spencer
- Ida Ekblad
- Jeff Elrod
- Urs Fischer
- Walton Ford
- Charles Gaines
- Robert Grosvenor
- Robert Holyhead
- Jeff Koons
- Liz Larner
- Vera Lutter
- Inge Mahn
- Marepe
- Beatriz Milhazes
- Ernesto Neto
- Frank Nitsche
- David Novros
- Navid Nuur
- Albert Oehlen
- Adam Pendleton (since 2018)
- Richard Prince
- Bridget Riley
- Julian Schnabel
- Raphaela Simon
- Rudolf Stingel
- Thomas Struth
- Tursic & Mille
- Edmund de Waal
- Rebecca Warren
- Grace Weaver
- Christopher Wool
- Zhang Wei
- Toby Ziegler

In addition, the gallery manages various artist estates, including:

- Karel Appel
- William Copley
- Günther Förg
- Raymond Hains
- Hans Josephsohn
- Michel Majerus
- Joan Mitchell

In addition, there have been exhibitions of Soto, Twombly's sculptures and Warhol's portraits.
