= Elwood Graham =

American politician (1902–1978)

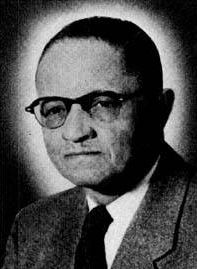

Member of the Illinois House of Representatives from the 22nd, 29th district
- In office January 1957 – January 1965
- In office January 1967 – January 1973
- Succeeded by: Robert H. Holloway

Personal details
- Born: April 10, 1902 Chicago, Illinois, U.S.
- Died: October 9, 1978 (aged 76) Chicago, Illinois, U.S.
- Party: Republican

Elwood Graham (April 10, 1902 – October 9, 1978) was a state legislator in Illinois. He served in the Illinois House of Representatives from 1957 to 1965 and again from 1967 to 1973. He was a Republican.

In 1964, due to a failure of the General Assembly to agree on a redistricting plan, every House representative was elected at-large statewide, in what became known as the bedsheet ballot election. Each party slated 118 candidates; every Democratic candidate won but only half of the Republicans did. As a result, 35 Republican incumbents lost their seats, and Graham was among them. Graham rejoined the legislature after the 1966 election and remained a member, now from the redrawn 29th district, until the 1972 election, in which he was unseated by Robert H. Holloway.

Graham was one of three African American Republicans elected to the 77th Illinois General Assembly in 1970, but the other two died during 1972. When the legislature was called into special session by Governor Ogilvie in November 1972, it was the first time since Edward D. Green in 1912 that there had been only one African American Republican in the General Assembly.

Graham was born on April 10, 1902, in Chicago, where he lived throughout his life. He died on October 9, 1978, at his sister's house in Chicago. The publisher of the Chicago Metro News remembered him as "a fighter for two party representation".

== See also ==
- List of African-American officeholders (1900–1959)
