= Jess Jackson =

Jess Jackson may refer to:

- Jess Stonestreet Jackson Jr. (1930–2011), American wine entrepreneur and lawyer
- Jess Jackson (record producer) (born 1980), British record producer

== See also ==
- Jesse Jackson (disambiguation)
