= Marepe =

Marepe may refer to:

- Marepe (artist) (born 1970), Brazilian contemporary artist
- Marepe (place), a peak in the northern Drakensberg, South Africa
