= Irene McCoy Gaines =

American social worker and civil rights activist (1892–1964)

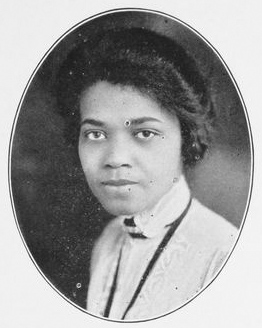
- Irene McCoy Gaines
- Born: Irene Luberta McCoy; October 25, 1892; Ocala, Florida, U.S.
- Died: April 7, 1964 (aged 71); Chicago, Illinois, U.S.
- Occupations: Social worker, civic leader, Republican Party activist
- Political party: Republican

Irene McCoy Gaines (October 25, 1892 – April 7, 1964) was an American social worker and civil rights activist who fought against segregation throughout her adult life.

== Early life ==
Irene McCoy Gaines was born on October 25, 1892, in Ocala, Florida, but grew up in Chicago. After graduating from Fisk Normal School she got a job as a stenographer in juvenile court in October 1913. In 1914, she married Harris B. Gaines and took graduate courses in social work and law at the University of Chicago. In 1918 she became an employment counselor at the Chicago Urban League, an organization which helped to improve the living and working conditions for African American citizens. In 1919 she became an organizer in the girls division of the war camp community service program where she advocated for better living conditions and opportunities for black women.

== Fight against segregation ==
In the 1930s, Gaines worked as a social worker while her sons were going through school. There she became aware of the inferior conditions of Chicago's segregated schools and she worked to improve them through her membership in the Citizen's Advisory Committee and the Chicago Council of Negro Organizations, for which she served as president for 14 years (1939–1953).

She became a member of the Theosophical Society, an inter-faith group dedicated to the foundation of a common humanity. Here she developed interracial relationships, support, and friendships. 1931 she served as head of the interracial committee of the Chicago Women's Club.

== Fight against oppression of women ==
Gaines became more politically active later in life, working especially on issues impacting African-American women. She was the first African American woman to run for a state legislative seat in Illinois and also ran for the county's commissioners office. In 1947 Gaines even testified in the United Nations about the discrimination and oppression of women of color in the United States.

Gaines served as the 15th President of the National Association of Colored Women's Clubs from 1952 to 1958. Irene received the George Washington Honor Medal in 1958 and the Fisk University Distinguished Alumni Service Award in 1959.

Gaines was recognized for several awards and achievements which included the Dorie Miller trophy for outstanding community work (received October 2, 1955) and a $50,000 reward she received from the Sears Foundation for neighborhood improvement. The contest was conducted by the NACWC and they believed Gaines was more than qualified and capable to receive the grant and actually produce results due to her constant efforts and interest in issues with housing located in several communities around the state. She continued to seek opportunity for her race and more specifically for the younger generation and women of color. She was known to plan internationally for she wanted to give individuals around the country access to the opportunities she was establishing in Chicago.

== Personal life and death ==
Irene Gaines was married to Harris B. Gaines, with whom she had two sons, Charles and Harris Jr.

Gaines died of cancer on April 7, 1964, in Chicago.
