= Giulia Andreani =

Italian artist (born 1985)

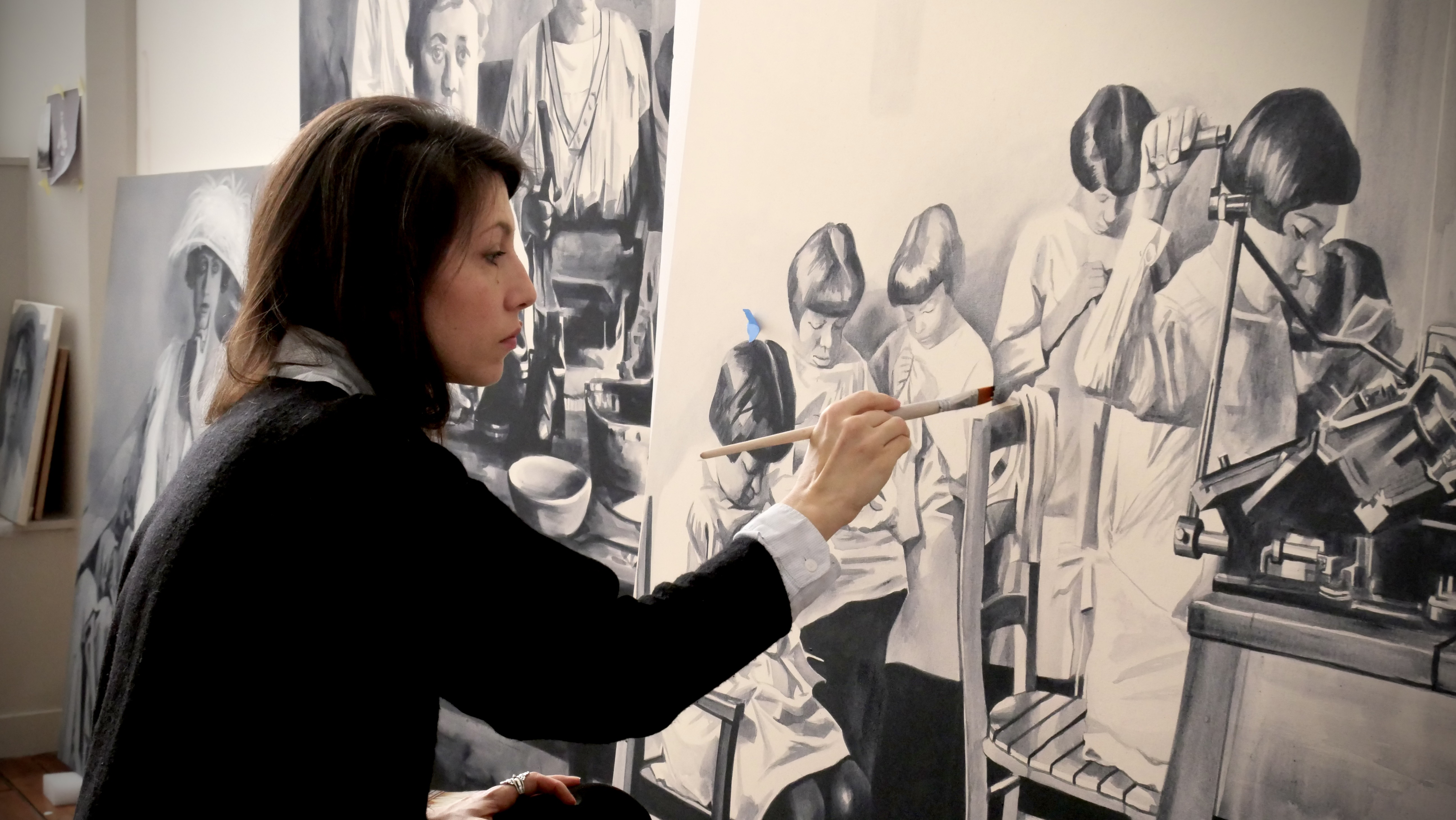
- Born: 1985 (age 40–41); Venice, Italy
- Education: Academy of Fine Arts, Venice, Paris IV-Sorbonne University
- Occupations: Painter, artist
- Movement: History painting

Giulia Andreani, born in Venice in 1985, is an Italian artist who lives and works in Paris. She is represented by Galerie Max Hetzler.

== Education ==
Andreani graduated from the Academy of Fine Arts, Venice in 2008. She continued her studies in the history of art, graduating with a master's degree in contemporary art from Paris IV-Sorbonne University in 2010.

== Works ==
Andreani focuses on the pictorial genre of history painting. She collects images from libraries, archives and family albums which she transposes into her works, using only the colour Payne's grey.

In 2012, she took inspiration from Italian cinema to trace the history of Europe between the 1920s and 1960s. She directed a series of dictators, for which she chose photographs representing teenagers. In the series entitled Daddies, Hitler's generals are presented as good fathers.

In 2013, she painted a portrait of Margaret Thatcher looking uncomfortable whilst holding newborns in her arms.

In 2015, she worked on the representation of women serving male power during the First World War, portraying women at work in men's clothes in roles such as firefighters or railway workers.

In 2018, she presented L'intermezzo (The Interlude), a project from a 2017 residency in a maternal center in the suburbs of Paris. She combined images of Cuban soldiers from the 2000s with portraits of young mothers. The title of the project was a reference to Les Guérillères, a feminist novel by Monique Wittig published in 1969.

In 2022, she had a solo exhibition entitled Kitchen Knife at Galerie Max Hetzler Bleibtreustraße 45 location.

Andreani was nominated for the Prix Marcel Duchamp 2022.

In 2026, she had a solo exhibition entitled Sabotage at the Hamburger Bahnhof in Berlin, Germany.

== Awards ==
- 2022: Prix Marcel Duchamp 2022 (Nomination)
- 2013: Aica Award
- 2012: Sciences Po Prize for Contemporary Art
- 2011: Paliss'art

== Public collections ==
- Bibliothèque Nationale de France (BNF), Paris
- Centre culturel régional Opderschmelz, Dudelange
- Collection de la Ville de Montrouge, Mountrouge
- Centre Georges Pompidou, Paris
- Fondazione Sandretto Re Rebaudengo, Turin
- FRAC Poitou-Charentes, Angoulême
- MASP, São Paulo
- Musée National de l'Histoire de l'Immigration (MNHI), Paris
- URDLA, Villeurbanne

== Solo exhibitions ==
- Sabotage, Hamburger Bahnhof, Berlin (2026)
- Kitchen Knife, Galerie Max Hetzler, Berlin (2022)
- Pétrichor, Galerie Saint-Séverin, Paris (2020)
- Pigs and Old Lace, Galerie Max Hetzler, London (2020)
- La cattiva, Musée des Beaux-Arts de Dole, Dole (2019)
- Art Must Hang, Galerie Max Hetzler, Paris (2019)
- Correspondances, Villa Médicis, Rome (2018)
- Intermezzo, VNH Gallery, Paris (2018)
- Silent faces, 22.48 m2, Paris (2014)
- Giulia Andreani & Agathe Pitié, Galerie de l'Escale, Levallois (2013)
- [non] si passa la frontiera, Bendana-Pinel Art Contemporain, Paris (2013)
- Peintures et dessins, Hôtel du département de l’Eure, Évreux (2012)
- Journal d’une iconophage, Galerie Premier Regard, Paris (2012)
- I shot him down, L’inlassable Galerie, Paris (2012)

== Group exhibitions ==
- Prix Marcel Duchamp 2022, Centre Pompidou, Paris (2022)
- Manifesto of Fragility, The 16th Lyon Biennale, Lyon (2022)
- Avec un parfum d'aventure (With a Hint of Adventure), Musée d'Art Contemporain, Lyon (2020)
- Made in France, Galerie Max Hetzler, Paris (2020)
