= Robert H. Holloway =

Illinois state legislator (1918–2005)

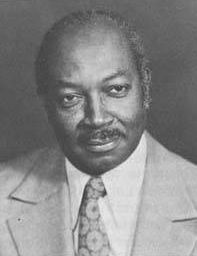

Member of the Illinois House of Representatives from the 29th district
- In office January 10, 1973 – January 8, 1975
- Preceded by: Elwood Graham
- Succeeded by: Charles E. Gaines

Personal details
- Born: May 4, 1918 Emmet, Arkansas, U.S.
- Died: November 21, 2005 (aged 87) Chicago, Illinois, U.S.
- Party: Republican
- Education: Englewood High School; Loyola University Chicago School of Law

Robert H. Holloway (May 4, 1918 – November 21, 2005) was a lawyer and state legislator in Illinois. He was elected to the Illinois House of Representatives in 1972 and served one term.

== Early life and education ==
Robert H. Holloway was born in Emmet, Arkansas, on May 4, 1918. Brought to Chicago at the age of four, he attended James McCosh Elementary and Englewood High School.

He was a soldier during World War II, completing Officer Candidates School, achieving the rank of Captain, and serving in North Africa as the commander of a Port Battalion and Recreation Facility.

Holloway earned a law degree from Loyola in 1949.

== Career ==
Holloway had his own law firm in Chicago. After nine years in private practice, he was appointed to the state's attorneys office, where he served as an Assistant State's Attorney from 1957 to 1967. He ran for clerk of the Illinois appellate court in 1962, but lost to incumbent Leslie Beck.

Holloway became a 6th Ward Republican committeeman in 1968. He was an assistant to the sheriff of Cook County from 1968 to 1969, and by 1972 he was an assistant Illinois Attorney General.

A Republican, he served in the Illinois House of Representatives, representing District 29 from 1973 to 1975. He served on the Judiciary I Committee. Although the 29th district was heavily Democratic, he was one of a small number of African American Republicans who were able to win election from such districts prior to the Cutback Amendment, due to an arrangement between the parties under which each party only ran two candidates for each three-member legislative district.
