= Kunsthalle Zürich =

Art exhibition centre in Zürich, Switzerland

Coordinates: 47°23′21.4″N 8°31′30.73″E

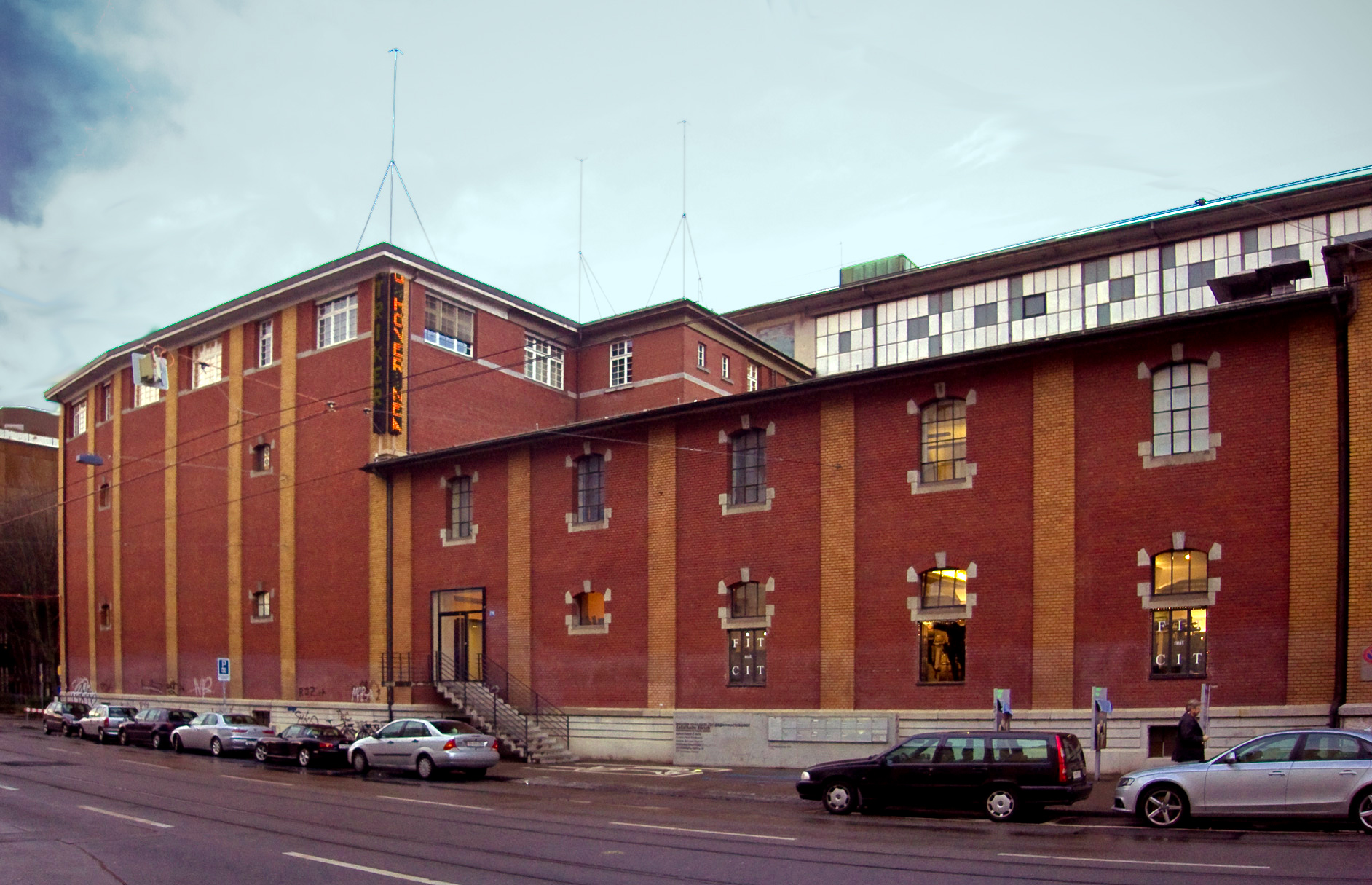
View of Kunsthalle Zürich

The Kunsthalle Zürich is a kunsthalle (a contemporary art exhibition centre) in Zürich, Switzerland. Founded in 1985, it is located on Limmatstrasse, near the city centre. A number of temporary exhibitions are organized each year.

== Directors ==
- 2002–2014: Beatrix Ruf
- 2014–2024: Daniel Baumann
- from 2025: Fanny Hauser

== Exhibitions ==
Some artists who have had solo exhibitions include:

- Ed Atkins
- Phyllida Barlow
- Ulla von Brandenburg
- Trisha Donnelly
- Ida Ekblad
- Helmut Federle
- Isa Genzken
- Gilbert and George (closed early due to the COVID-19 pandemic)
- Terence Koh
- Sherrie Levine
- Sarah Lucas
- Gabriel Orozco
- Laura Owens
- Philippe Parreno
- Walid Raad
- Eva Rothschild
- Wilhelm Sasnal
- Sturtevant
- Wolfgang Tillmans
- Rosemarie Trockel
- Keith Tyson
- Didier Vermeiren
