= André Butzer =

German artist

André Butzer (born 7 June 1973 in Stuttgart) is a German artist.

== Life and work ==
Butzer studied for a short time at the Merz Akademie in Stuttgart and the Hochschule für bildende Künste Hamburg, and was a member of the "Akademie Isotrop" group in Hamburg from 1996 to 2000.

Butzer became famous for his paintings, which he himself described as "Science Fiction Expressionism". His paintings can be sorted into different genres, such as the "Friedens-Siemense" (Peace Siemenses), "Schande-Menschen" (Men of Shane), the "Frau" (Woman) or the "Wanderer", completely monochrome or extreme, Abstract paintings that resemble colorful visions of lost technological utopias. According to Guillermo Solana, Butzer’s characters seem "like Disney figures painted by Munch."

Butzer names Walt Disney, Edvard Munch, Henri Matisse, Friedrich Hölderlin and Henry Ford as his role models. He also appeared in public under the names N-Hölderlin, Henry Butzer, and Calvin Cohn. Butzer’s utopian, artistic design is located in the fictional place "Nasaheim" ("N"), a kind of pilgrimage site in space, "where the inhabitants contemplate the decommissioned machines of destruction and all who arrive there are made innocent".

However, his paintings do not appear to be translations of narrative structures; rather, they bring forth content, i.e., they express something that could not be said before. The artist often produces in series and instrumentalizes the means of repetition as an "amoral method of representation". Some of the paintings can be classified as history paintings, also through their depiction of history as a drama of individual figures.

According to Hannah Eckstein, Butzer’s paintings show a world that is "once again out of joint. His paintings and watercolors are as touching as they are disturbing. They call for caution and vigilance. All too easily, as history tells, man tends to repeat his transgressions and, all of a sudden, appears with a monstrously transformed face, as if in a Kafkaesque nightmare." Usually, he either applies paint very thickly, painting in several layers, or achieving lighter, cartoon-like results by using alla prima painting.

Steffen Krüger, states that "Butzer’s fascinating fusion of early European Expressionism with ready-made American pop culture, the conceptual recurrence and apparent seriality of his figures, as well as his insistence on the bare human dignity, are a testament to his courageous and continuous enquiry into societal contradictions and social non-conformity."

Butzer lives in Berlin-Wannsee.

== Solo exhibitions ==
- 2025: Skarstedt, New York. Frau am Tisch mit Früchten, Galerie Max Hetzler, Paris
- 2024: Glaube, Liebe und Hoffnung, Museo Novecento, Florence. »... und der Tod ist auch ein Leben.«, Museo Stefano Bardini, Florence. GfG Gesellschaft für Gegenwartskunst, Augsburg. Farbtheorie, Parish church St Nikolaus, Innsbruck. nw9 – Kunstraum der Stiftung Kunstwissenschaft, Cologne
- 2023: Maikäfer flieg!, Kunstverein Friedrichshafen. Museo Nacional Thyssen-Bornemisza, Madrid. Kirschmichel, Galerie Max Hetzler, Berlin. Nino Mier Gallery, New York. Miettinen Collection / Salon Dahlmann, Berlin. Oberpfälzer Künstlerhaus, Schwandorf
- 2022: Friedrichs Foundation, Weidingen
- 2021: 12 years collecting André, Nino Mier Gallery, Los Angeles. Galería Heinrich Ehrhardt, Madrid. André Butzer / Ulrich Wulff, Galerie Bernd Kugler, Innsbruck. Galerie Max Hetzler, Berlin
- 2020: Light, Colour and Hope, YUZ Museum, Shanghai. Museum of the Light, Hokuto. Galerie Max Hetzler, Paris. Carbon 12, Dubai
- 2019: Galerie Bernd Kugler, Innsbruck. Galerie Christine Mayer, Munich
- 2018: IKOB Museum of Contemporary Art, Eupen. Nino Mier Gallery, Cologne. 1 Eis, bitte! (1999), Galerie Max Hetzler, London. Auf Wiedersehen in Kopenhagen. A Solo Show on Planet Earth, Sunday-S, Copenhagen. Selected Works from Private Collections, Galerie Max Hetzler, Berlin
- 2017: Växjö Konsthall, Växjö. Carbon 12 Gallery, Dubai. Galerie Xippas, Geneva. Nino Mier Gallery, Los Angeles. Galerie Bernd Kugler, Innsbruck. Galeria Mário Sequeira, Braga. Metro Pictures, New York
- 2016: ... und sah den Frieden des Himmels, Bavarian Army Museum, Ingolstadt. Neue Galerie, Gladbeck. Hiromi Yoshii, Tokyo. Galerie Christine Mayer, Munich
- 2015: Kunstverein Reutlingen. Galerie Max Hetzler, Berlin
- 2014: Galerie Christine Mayer, Munich. Hiromi Yoshii, Tokyo. Carbon 12, Dubai
- 2013: Metro Pictures, New York. Gió Marconi, Milan. Galerie Max Hetzler, Berlin
- 2012: Rhona Hoffman Gallery, Chicago. Mário Sequeira, Braga.
- 2011: Kunsthistorisches Museum and CAC Contemporary Art Club at the Theseustempel, Vienna. André Butzer – Der wahrscheinlich beste abstrakte Maler der Welt, Kestnergesellschaft, Hanover
- 2010: Nicht fürchten! Don't be scared!, Metro Pictures, New York. Galerie Bernd Kugler, Innsbruck
- 2009: Viele Tote im Heimatland: Fanta, Sprite, H-Milch, Micky und Donald! Paintings 1999–2009, Kunsthalle Nuremberg. Galerie Max Hetzler, Berlin
- 2008: Butzer / Dahlem, Galerie Heinrich Ehrhardt, Madrid. Metro Pictures, New York
- 2007: Ortsmuseum Wolfshalden. Alison Jacques Gallery, London. Gary Tatintsian Gallery, Moscow. Friedens-Siemense (Teil 2) , Galerie Guido W. Baudach, Berlin
- 2006: Amerikanische Technik im Jahre 2017, Patrick Painter, Santa Monica. N-Leben, Gió Marconi, Milan. Galerie Bernd Kugler, Innsbruck. Galerie Max Hetzler, Berlin
- 2005: Kunstverein Ulm
- 2004: Das Ende vom Friedens-Siemens Menschentraum, Kunstverein Heilbronn
- 2003: Chips und Pepsi und Medizin, Galerie Max Hetzler, Berlin. Todall! , Galerie Hammelehle und Ahrens, Cologne
- 2002: Nasaheim Blumen , Galerie Christine Mayer, Munich. Friedens-Siemense (Teil 1) , Galerie Gabriele Senn, Vienna. Wanderung nach Annaheim, Galerie Guido W. Baudach, Berlin
- 2001: Galerie Hammelehle und Ahrens, Stuttgart
- 2000: Der Realismus bereut nichts, Contemporary Fine Arts, Berlin
- 1999: Ich bin Munch, Galerie Esther Freund, Vienna

== Group exhibitions ==
- 2026: Becoming Paula: London Berlin Worpswede Paris. 150 Jahre Paula Modersohn-Becker, Paula Modersohn-Becker Museum, Bremen. 700 Year of Art, Städel Museum, Frankfurt am Main.
- 2025: The Long Now 1985–2025: Saatchi Gallery at 40, Saatchi Gallery, London. Collection Highlights, Rubell Museum, Miami / FL. I will look into the Earth: Miettinen Collection, Kunsthalle Helsinki. Only Human, Kunsthalle 8000, Wädenswil. seconda horisonda: Asger Jorn and the others. Erinnerungen an die Zukunft, Ketterer, Cologne. Denke frei, schaffe neu! Die Sammlung im Blick, Galerie Stadt Sindelfingen. All our Todays, MARe Museum, Bucharest. Sonne, Mond und Sterne — mit der Tradition nicht brechen, Städtische Galerie, Ostfildern. Maybe it was Magic: New works from the Miettinen Collection, Miettinen Collection, Berlin. Gras der Kindheit (Walter Zimmermann), Achim Freyer Kunsthaus, Berlin
- 2024: How to Collect Art: Karel Tutsch Story, Galerie moderního umění, Hradci Králové. Beginner’s Mind: Zum 75. Geburtstag von Walter Zimmermann, Galerie Max Hetzler, Berlin. Landschaftsmalerei, Galerie Bernd Kugler, Innsbruck. »daß die Göttin nicht himmelwärts, sondern herab nach ihren Freunden blickt«, Secci Gallery, Florence
- 2023: Magic + Cool: Malerei der Jahrtausendwende, Museum Penzberg / Sammlung Campendonk, Penzberg. Now – Arte Contemporânea Mundial, Museu Inimá de Paula, Belo Horizonte. Extraordinary Form: Abstract and Non-Figurative Art from Miettinen Collection 1970 to the Present, Miettinen Collection, Berlin. Meisterwerke der Druckgrafik, Feuerbachhaus, Speyer. The Day I say You: Retatos de la Colección Fundación AMMA, Museo de Arte Contemporáneo Querétaro, Mexixo City. The Teardrop explodes, Kunsthaus Villa Jauss, Oberstdorf. das gelbe Licht 6 Uhr nachmittags, Galerie Max Hetzler, Berlin.
- 2022: Die Nacktheit der Zeichnung, Gesellschaft für Gegenwartskunst, Augsburg. wir sagen uns Dunkles dark things we tell each other, Miettinen Collection / Salon Dahlmann, Berlin. #holzschnitt: 1400 bis heute, Kupferstichkabinett, Berlin. Follow George Grosz – Gemälde, Zeichnungen, Druckgrafik und Filme, Kunstsammlung Jena. Mix & Match. Die Sammlung neu entdecken, Pinakothek der Moderne, Munich. Through our eyes: Resonance and Illusion in Contemporary Portraits, Center of International Contemporary Art, Vancouver. Unendliche Geschichten. Aus der Sammlung Oehmen, Museum Ratingen. The Innerworld of the Outerworld of the Innerworld, Soy Capitán, Berlin
- 2021: Expedition, Brattleboro Museum, Brattleboro / VT. Art-Book: Pictoriality in Print, Musashino Art University Museum, Tokyo. Nassima Landau Foundation, Tel Aviv. Kunstmuseum Stuttgart.
- 2020: Museum as a New Public Space: Distorted Portrait, Space K Gallery, Seoul. Under certain Circumstances, IKOB Museum of Contemporary Art, Eupen. Hölderlinturm, Tübingen.
- 2019: Inaugural Exhibition, Rubell Museum, Miami / FL. Contemporary German Art from the Adam Collection, Dům umění – House of Art, Ostrava. Hymne an die Jugend, Märkisches Museum, Witten
- 2018: Gastspiel – Die Sammlungen Grässlin und Wiesenauer im Dialog, Sammlung Grässlin – Räume für Kunst, St. Georgen
- 2017: Abstract Painting Now!, Kunsthalle Krems, Krems. Peter Saul, Sammlung Falckenberg, Hamburg. Hope and Hazard: A Comedy of Eros, Hall Art Foundation, Vermont.
- 2016: Sammlung Viehof – Internationale Kunst der Gegenwart, Deichtorhallen, Hamburg. Wir suchen das Weite. Reisebilder, Kupferstichkabinett, Berlin
- 2015: German Cool, Salsali Private Museum, Dubai United Arab Emirates
- 2015: Avatar und Atavismus, Kunsthalle Düsseldorf
- 2014: Ordinary Freaks. Coolness in Pop Culture, Halle für Kunst und Medien, Graz. Wo ist hier? #1: Malerei und Gegenwart, Kunstverein Reutlingen. Fürchtet Euch nicht! Bestimmung des Feldes zu einer gegebenen Zeit: Malerei nach 2000, Neue Galerie Gladbeck
- 2013: Painting forever!, KW Kunstwerke, Berlin. Bienal Internacional de Curitiba, Curitiba. Wenn Wünsche wahr werden, Kunsthalle Emden. Moca’s Permanent Collection. A Selection of Recent Acquisitions, Museum of Contemporary Art, Los Angeles
- 2012: Eine Frau, ein Baum, eine Kuh, Museum für Konkrete Kunst, Ingolstadt / Kunstraum Munich. Circus Wols, Weserburg Museum, Bremen
- 2011: Gesamtkunstwerk: New Art from Germany, Saatchi Gallery, London. Abstract Confusion, Kunstverein Ulm / Neue Galerie Gladbeck / Kunsthalle Erfurt
- 2010: Se Não Neste Tempo – Pintura Alemã Contemporânea: 1989–2010, Museu de Arte de São Paulo, São Paulo. Permanent Trouble – Aktuelle Kunst aus der Sammlung Kopp, KOG Kunstforum Ostdeutsche Galerie, Regensburg
- 2009: Extended. Sammlung Landesbank Baden-Württemberg, Museum für Neue Kunst, Karlsruhe
- 2008: Bad Painting – good art, MUMOK, Vienna. Vertrautes Terrain – Aktuelle Kunst in & über Deutschland ZKM, Karlsruhe. Karotten und Schweinehals – Deutsche Kunst seit 1995, Oldenburger Kunstverein, Oldenburg. Brillantfeuerwerk, Haus der Kunst, Munich. Back to Black, Kestnergesellschaft Hanover. Kommando Tilman Riemenschneider. Europa 2008, Hospitalhof Stuttgart.
- 2007: Euro-Centric, Part I: New European Art from the Rubell Family Collection, Rubell Family Collection, Miami. Imagination Becomes Reality. Eine Ausstellung zum erweiterten Malereibegriff. Werke aus der Sammlung Goetz, ZKM Karlsruhe, Karlsruhe; Kommando Friedrich Hölderlin Berlin, Galerie Max Hetzler, Berlin
- 2006: Imagination Becomes Reality: Ein mehrteiliger Ausstellungszyklus zum Bildverständnis aktueller Kunst. Part IV: Borrowed Images, Sammlung Goetz, Munich
- 2005: Les Grands Spectacles: 120 Jahre Kunst und Massenkultur, Museum der Moderne, Salzburg. Styles und Stile: Contemporary German Painting from the Scharpff Collection, Sofia Art Gallery, Sofia. Munch Revisited, Museum am Ostwall, Dortmund. La Peinture Allemande, Carré d’Art Musée d’Art Contemporain, Nîmes
- 2003: deutschemalereizweitausenddrei, Frankfurter Kunstverein, Frankfurt am Main. Vom Horror der Kunst, Steirischer Herbst 2003, Grazer Kunstverein, Graz. Heißkalt: Aktuelle Malerei aus der Sammlung Scharpff, Staatsgalerie Stuttgart / Kunsthalle Hamburg
- 2002: Offene Haare, offene Pferde: Amerikanische Kunst 1933-45, Kölnischer Kunstverein, Cologne. Schwarzwaldhochstrasse: Der deutsche Südwesten und die Folgen für die Kunst, Kunsthalle Baden-Baden
- 2001: Viva November, Städtische Galerie, Wolfsburg. 1. Tirana Biennale: Escape, Tirana
- 2000: Akademie Isotrop, Kunstakademie Bergen
- 1999: Akademie Isotrop: Revolution, Evolution, Exekution, Gesellschaft für aktuelle Kunst, Bremen. Akademie Isotrop: Contents and Documents, Cubitt, London
- 1998: Junge Szene, Secession, Vienna
- 1997: Akademie Isotrop, Künstlerhaus Stuttgart

== Public collections ==
- Art Institute of Chicago
- Carré d'Art, Nîmes: Untitled, 2009, Oil on Canvas, 180 × 130 cm
- Denver Art Museum, Denver
- Galerie moderního umění, Hradci Králové: Untitled (KOMMANDO FRIEDRICH SCHILLER), 2004, Linocut on Paper, artist print, 216 × 160 cm, 1/5 – 5/5, here: 3/5 (Linn 11).
- Hall Art Foundation, Reading / Derneburg: Portrait Carl Zuckmayer, 2004, Oil on Canvas, 300 × 200 cm. Bruno Bettelheim (Kinderpsychologe), 2005, Oil on Canvas, 280 × 220 cm
- Hamburger Bahnhof – Nationalgalerie der Gegenwart, Berlin: Untitled, Oil on Canvas, 280 × 420 cm
- Hamburger Kunsthalle, Hamburg: 1 Eis, bitte!, 1999, Acrylic on Canvas, 210 × 150 cm (Inv.-Nr. G-2025-20). Ohne Titel, 2022, Acrylic on Canvas, 211 × 200 cm (Inv.-Nr. G-2025-21)
- ICA Institute of Contemporary Art, Miami: Ländlich, 2022, Acrylic on Canvas, 282 × 200 cm (Inv.-Nr. 2025.63.1)
- Kupferstichkabinett, Staatliche Museen zu Berlin: Landmappe, 2009, 14 Etchings on hand-made Paper, various formats, Edition: 1/10–10/10 + 2 a.p. + 2 p.p., here: a.p. (Linn 21). Untitled 1–2, 2010, Linocut on Römerturm 250 g, each 195 × 150 cm, Edition: 1/5–5/5 + 1 a.p. + 1 p.p., here: a.p. (Linn 24). Untitled 1–3, 2011, Etching on Hand-made Paper (3 parts), each 34,7 × 25 cm, Edition: 1/30–30/30, here: 30/30 (Linn 28). Untitled I–VIII, 2012, Woodcut on Incisioni Cartiera Magnani 310 g, 100 × 70 cm, Edition: 1/5–5/5 + 2 a.p. + 2 p.p., here: a.p. (Linn 29)
- Los Angeles County Museum of Art (LACMA), Los Angeles: Untitled, 2007, Oil on Canvas, 180 × 230, David Hoberman Donation (M.2014.267.1). Ohne Titel (Munch), 2007, Watercolor on Paper, 295,9 × 204,1 cm, Dean Valentine and Amy Adelson Donation (M.2010.188.1)
- Marciano Art Collection, Los Angeles: Untitled, 2017, Oil on Canvas, 210 × 150 cm. Untitled, 2019, Acrylic and Lacquer on Canvas, 365 × 285 cm
- Musée d'Art Moderne de Paris: Untitled, 2024, Acrylic on Canvas, 200 × 350 cm
- Museum der bildenden Künste, Leipzig: Untitled, 2023–2024, Acrylic on Canvas, 200 × 321 cm
- Museum moderner Kunst Stiftung Ludwig (mumok), Wien: Untitled, 2023, Acrylic on Canvas, 294 × 202 cm (MB 191/0)
- Museum of Contemporary Art, Los Angeles (MOCA): Untitled (Viele Tote durch Hermann Giesler!), 2007, Oil on Canvas, 290 × 250 cm, Stefan Simchowitz Donation (2012.61)
- Museum of Old and New Art, Tasmania: I hann mei Flasch Fanda scho lang leergsoffa (Bleibet Gsond!), Oil on Canvas, 180 × 300 cm
- Paula Modersohn-Becker Museum, Bremen: Paula Modersohn-Becker, 2017, Oil on Canvas, 210 × 150 cm
- Pinakothek der Moderne, Munich: Xylon (f. Walter Zimmermann), 2022, Acrylic on Canvas, 240 × 191 cm (GV 424)
- Rubell Family Collection, Miami: Friedens-Siemens XV, 2004, Oil on Canvas, 270 × 220 cm. Köchin vom Hasengulasche?, 2004, Acrylic on Canvas, 250 × 200 cm. Ludwig Troost, 2005, Oil on Canvas, 250 × 200 cm. Aufenthaltsort von Dietrich Bonhoeffer, 2005, Oil on Canvas, 250 × 200 cm. Untitled, 2006, Oil on Canvas, 200 × 250 cm. Mirinda Disziplinar, 2006, Oil on Canvas, 250 × 200 cm. Todesversion von Walt, 2006, Oil on Canvas, 250 × 200 cm. N-Technologie (tote Körper), 2006, Oil on Canvas, 280 × 460 cm. N-Supp’ Löffel X (Affen), 2006, Oil on Canvas, 260 × 200 cm. N-Leben (2), 2006, Oil on Canvas, 220 × 280 cm. Friedens-Siemens XX, 2007, Oil on Canvas, 320 × 260 cm. Ragonium L, 2007, Oil on Canvas, 260 × 340 cm. Untitled, 2007, Oil on Canvas, 70 × 105 cm
- Tyrolean State Museum Ferdinandeum: Portrait Kurt Schuschnigg, 2005, Oil on Canvas, 250 × 200 cm
- Goetz Collection, Munich
- Federal Collection of Contemporary Art, Bonn: Vater mit Mohn, Oil on Canvas, 215 × 310 cm
- Seattle University, Seattle
- Städel Museum, Frankfurt am Main: Untitled, 2023, Acrylic on Canvas, 200 × 251 cm
- University of Chicago – Booth School of Business: Untitled, 2008, Oil on Canvas, 200 × 260 cm
- University of Washington, Seattle
- Yuz Museum, Shanghai: Abstraktes Bild Nr. 4710d, 2018, Oil, Acrylic and Lacquer on Canvas, 256 × 185 cm

== André Butzer Archive ==
Since 2020, art historian Christian Malycha has been directing the André Butzer Archive, initially in Altadena, California, and Rangsdorf, since 2025 in Berlin.
