= Jesse Jackson (disambiguation) =

Jesse Jackson (1941–2026) was an American civil rights activist and minister.

Jesse Jackson may also refer to:

- Jesse Jackson Jr. (born 1965), United States Congressman
- Jesse B. Jackson (1871–1947), United States consul
- Jesse C. Jackson (1908–1983), United States novelist
- Jesse Jackson (state legislator), state representative from 1981 to 1983

== See also ==
- Jessie Jackson (Coronation Street), fictional character
- Jesse Jackson House, a historic home in North Carolina
