= Harris B. Gaines =

Illinois legislator and lawyer

Harris B. Gaines Sr. (1888 - 1964) was an American lawyer and politician in Illinois. He served in the Illinois House of Representatives from 1929 to 1935. Irene McCoy Gaines was his wife and they had two sons, Harris Gaines Jr. and Charles E. Gaines.

Gaines was born in Henderson, Kentucky. He worked as a plasterer and contractor before becoming a lawyer. He moved with his family to Chicago and studied at Depauw University. John Marshall Law School, and the University of Chicago. His wife worked as a stenographer and then a social worker. She was a leader in various civic groups and for the Idlewild owners association. The Chicago History Museum has a collection of her papers.
