= Charles E. Gaines =

American politician (1924–2000)

Charles Ellis Gaines
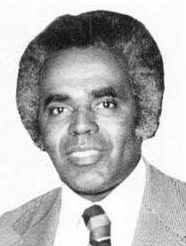

Member of the Illinois House of Representatives from the 29th district
- In office January 8, 1975 – January 14, 1981
- Preceded by: Robert H. Holloway
- Succeeded by: Jesse Jackson

Personal details
- Born: January 16, 1924 Chicago, Illinois, U.S.
- Died: March 28, 2000 (aged 76) Chicago, Illinois, U.S.
- Resting place: Lincoln Cemetery
- Party: Republican
- Spouse: Lena Patton
- Parent(s): Harris B. Gaines; Irene McCoy Gaines
- Education: University of Illinois; John Marshall Law School; Loyola University Chicago

Charles Ellis Gaines (January 16, 1924 – March 28, 2000), also known as Charlie Gaines, was a Republican politician on the South Side of Chicago. He represented the 29th legislative district in the Illinois General Assembly from 1975 to 1981, winning election three times. He was the only African American Republican in the General Assembly at the time.

== Early life and education ==
Gaines was born on January 16, 1924. He was the son of Harris B. Gaines, a Republican state legislator, and Irene McCoy Gaines.

Gaines studied in the Chicago Public Schools and then at Fisk University from 1942 to 1944. He graduated from the University of Illinois in 1947 with an AB degree in history and political science. He went on to earn a law degree from John Marshall Law School and a graduate degree in social work from Loyola University Chicago.

A member of the Young Republicans, Gaines attended the first Eisenhower inaugural in 1953 along with future state senator Charles Chew. He became national vice president of the organization and attended the second inaugural as well.

== Political career ==
In 1968, Gaines ran in the Democratic primary as an "independent Democrat", but lost. He later subsequently switched political parties a second time and became a Republican once more. Because of the cumulative voting system then in force under the 1970 Illinois Constitution, in which the parties had agreed to each nominate no more than two candidates for each three-member district, a small number of Black Republicans were able to be elected from Chicago, such as Gaines and his successor Jesse Jackson. In 1972, he ran for the Republican nomination from the 29th district but lost in the primary.

In 1974, Gaines won election as a Republican from the 29th district. As a freshman representative at the opening of the 79th General Assembly in January 1975, Gaines was thrust into the spotlight as the House had deadlocked on the choice of speaker. On the 93rd ballot, Gaines and five other Republicans switched their votes and elected William A. Redmond speaker. In 1975, Gaines was elected chairman of the Black Elected Republican Officials organization.

Gaines had been a strong supporter of the Equal Rights Amendment (ERA). In 1978 when it came to the floor, however, he and four other members of the Illinois Legislative Black Caucus voted "present", causing the ERA ratification bill to fail. The representatives said that they took this action because leadership had maneuvered around them, claiming to have the votes of the black caucus without ever discussing the matter with caucus chair. Illinois did not ratify the ERA until 2018.

In the fall of 1979 Gaines split with the governor James R. Thompson on a number of high-profile votes, including sales tax relief and RTA funding. He also joined Black Democrats in speaking out against the governor's signing of legislation that eliminated civil and criminal penalties for discrimination. The governor ran a state highway worker named Jesse Jackson against Gaines in the primary, capitalizing on the name recognition of Jesse Jackson. Jackson defeated Gaines narrowly, by an average of one ballot per precinct.

In 1980, Gaines was defeated in the Republican primary. His supporters formed the Charles E. Gaines Political Party so that he could run as a third-party candidate. Conceding the general election, Gaines described the campaign as "a hard and bitter campaign that ended with the use of an electronic voting device that prevented the votes from being counted in the precinct."

In the 1980 election Gaines argued fiercely against the Cutback Amendment, which eliminated cumulative voting and instituted single-member districts when it took effect in 1982, writing that "once again white bigots want to reduce black power in the name of REFORM." The amendment passed and no African American Republicans were elected to the General Assembly thereafter.

In the 1992 election he ran as a Republican against Charles G. Morrow III in the 26th House district, but was defeated 30,415 to 2,725.

=== Committees ===
In the Illinois House of Representatives Gaines served on the following standing committees:

- 79th Illinois General Assembly (1975–1977): Elementary and Secondary Education, Human Resources, Personnel and Pensions.
- 80th Illinois General Assembly (1977–1979): Elementary and Secondary Education, Human Resources (minority spokesman), Personnel and Pensions.
- 81st Illinois General Assembly (1979–1981): Elementary and Secondary Education, Human Resources.

== Death and legacy ==
Gaines was remembered for his legislative work for senior citizens and for his community work on revitalizing the Chatham area.

Gaines died of cancer on March 28, 2000. He was buried in Lincoln Cemetery. The General Assembly issued a resolution mourning his death.
