= Robert Holyhead =

British artist

Robert Holyhead (born 1974 in Trowbridge, Wiltshire) is a British abstract artist. He studied painting at Manchester School of Art and completed his MA at Chelsea School of Art in 1997.

Holyhead's work is marked by expanses of white ground left uncovered with traces of colour at the canvas-edge where paint has been carefully removed from the surface. Whilst some pieces are covered almost entirely with semi-translucent paint others are, in contrast, sporadically punctured by intensely coloured, geometric shapes.

In 2005 he was awarded a five-year live/work residency at Acme Fire Station and in 2007 he was invited to spend three months in Switzerland on a residency with Fundaziun NAIRS. In 2009 he had a solo exhibition at Karsten Schubert and was included in The Painting Edition of the East End Academy at the Whitechapel Gallery, London.

He is represented by Galerie Max Hetzler, London, Paris, Berlin.

He is a senior lecturer in Fine Art at Anglia Ruskin University.

== Solo exhibitions ==
- 2019
  - 'No movement, no colour', Galerie Max Hetzler, London
- 2017
  - 'New Works', Galería Casado Santapau, Madrid
- 2016
  - 'Open Ground: Robert Holyhead', Parts Project, The Hague
  - Galerie Max Hetzler, Paris
- 2014
  - Galerie Max Hetzler, Berlin (catalogue)
- 2012
  - 'New Paintings', Karsten Schubert, London (catalogue)
  - 'Paintings and works on paper', PEER, London (catalogue)

== Group exhibitions ==
- 2019
  - 'Teaching Painting: Fully Awake 5.6', Freelands Foundation, London
  - 'Playtime', ARTHOUSE1, London
- 2017
  - 'Sotto Pelle', Annarumma gallery, Naples
  - 'Shaping the Void II', Tannery Arts, London
- 2016
  - Gillmeier Rech, Berlin
- 2015
  - 'Drawing Biennial', Tannery Arts, London
- 2014
  - 'Detail', H Gallery, Bangkok
- 2013
  - 'Stag - Berlin/London', Dispari & Dispari, Reggio Emilia
  - 'Drawings', Karsten Schubert, London
  - 'Every bird brings a different melody to the garden', No Format, London
  - 'System Painting', Construction Archive Lion and Lamb, London
  - 'Head to Head', Rogue Project Space, Manchester

== Commissions ==
2010 New British Embassy and the UK Permanent Representation to the European Union, Brussels, Belgium (Government Art Collection)

== Public collections ==
2011 Tate Collection

2009 Arts Council Collection of Great Britain, London

Centre Pompidou, Paris

Government Art Collection, London

YUZ Museum, Shanghai

== Publications ==
- Robert Holyhead [2014], with a text by David Ryan. Published by Holzwarth Publications in collaboration with Galerie Max Hetzler and Ridinghouse, London.
- Robert Holyhead [2010], in conversation with Anthony Spira. Published by Ridinghouse, London.
- Robert Holyhead: New Paintings [2009], with an essay by Anna Lovatt. Published by Ridinghouse, London.
- Robert Holyhead [2008], exhibition catalogue published by Vaughan Press.
