= Beatriz Milhazes =

Brazilian artist (born 1960)

- Born: Beatriz Milhazes; 1960; Rio de Janeiro, Brazil
- Known for: Painting
- Notable work: O Beijo (1995), Maresias (2002), Junior Mints (2006), Baleza Pura (2006)
- Movement: Modernism

Beatriz Milhazes (born 1960) is a Brazilian artist. She is known for her work juxtaposing Brazilian cultural imagery and references to western Modernist painting. Milhazes is a Brazilian-born collage artist and painter known for her large-scale works and vibrant colors. She has been called "Brazil's most successful contemporary painter."

Beatriz Milhazes's practice includes painting, drawing and collage. Characterized by vibrant colours, optical movement and energetic visual cadences, her abstract work fuses a diverse repertoire of images and forms, combining elements from her native Brazilian context with European abstraction.

As a painter, Beatriz Milhazes uses a unique transfer technique, first painting on plastic sheets before peeling away the dried shapes and collaging them onto the canvas. When she peels the plastic away, the resulting image is superimposed onto the canvas. For these paintings, as well as her collages, prints, and installations, Milhazes draws on a wide range of aesthetic traditions, including folk and decorative art, European modernism, and Antropofagia, a movement founded in the late 1920s that proposed “cannibalizing” the supposedly high-minded European traditions to create a distinctly Brazilian Culture.

Figurehead of the 80s Generation, period of the Brazilian art characterized by the return of young artists to painting, Beatriz Milhazes still lives in Rio, where she was born in 1960. It is in her studio with a view over the Botanical Garden that she polishes up her work.

She has had innumerous international solo exhibitions including Pinacoteca do Estado de São Paulo (2008); Fondation Cartier, Paris (2009); Fondation Beyeler, Basel (2011); Fundação Calouste Gulbenkian, Lisbon (2012); Museo de Arte Latinoamericano (Malba), Buenos Aires (2012); Paço Imperial, Rio de Janeiro (2013), Pérez Art Museum, Miami, USA (2014/2015), White Cube Gallery, London (2018), MASP – Museu de Arte de São Paulo (2020), Long Museum (West Bund), Shanghai (2021), Pace Gallery, NY (2022), Turner Contermporary and Galerie Max Hetzler Berlin (2023).

Milhazes is considered as one of the most important Brazilian artists, having participated at Carnegie International, Carnegie Museum of Art, Pittsburgh (1995); Sydney Biennial, Sydney (1998); Venice Biennale (2003); São Paulo Biennial (1998, 2004); and Shangai Biennial, Shangai (2006).

Her work is included in important museums and public collections such as Metropolitan Museum of Art, New York; MoMA – The Museum of Modern Art, New York; Solomon R. Guggenheim Museum, New York; Tate Modern, London; SFMoMA – San Francisco Museum of Modern Art, San Francisco; MNBA – Museu Nacional de Belas Artes, Rio de Janeiro; Pinacoteca do Estado de São Paulo, São Paulo; Instituto Itaú Cultural, São Paulo; Fundação Edson Queiroz, Fortaleza; Museum of Contemporary Art, Tokyo Art Museum, Tokyo; 21st Century Museum of Contemporary Art, Kanazawa; Museo Nacional Centro de Arte Reina Sofia, Madrid; Fondation Beyeler, Basel; Centre Georges Pompidou, Paris.

Milhazes is represented by Pace Gallery, New York; Galeria Fortes D’Aloia e Gabriel, Sao Paulo; Galerie Max Hetzler, Berlin; and White Cube, London.

She lives and works in Rio de Janeiro.

== Themes ==
Thematically, the work of Beatriz Milhazes has been described by one critic as "abstract, yet having something new to offer." This description is something that she believes draws people into her style, especially from a Western audience. Her work is known to contain many Brazilian folk references and can be interpreted as complex in this regard. These references, apparent in many of the vibrant colours and shapes, are often associated with the very poorest part of the population and are generally thought to be of little interest to the upper classes or intellectuals. These references have today changed in their meaning as the social elite has attached importance to them—the importance of being Brazilian and having Brazilian art. Finding the idea of a contradiction fascinating, it is another factor that influences the outcome of her art.

Her installation Gamboa II, for instance, was strongly influenced by the carnival in her native country Brazil which includes dance, costumes and parades. These elements are evident in the work with its bright colours that also embraces a feminine style to the work.

== Influence ==
Drawing from the optical reactions provoked by artists like Bridget Riley and Tarsila do Amaral, Milhazes believes that art is an essential way for people to aestheticize and exteriorize their thoughts and feelings. Her work often serves as an exploration of the concept of conflict. Filled with intense colors and shapes, her work serves to inspire a strong dialogue as well as “challenging eye movements over easy beauty.” Milhazes also draws her influences from many other female artists such as Sonia Delaunay, Georgia O'Keeffe, and Elizabeth Murray. She has also cited the canon of Brazilian art history as “empowering in its celebration of women artists such as herself.”

== Awards and medals ==
Year	Awards and medals
1984	Iberê Camargo Prize, acquisition prize from the 7th National Salon of Visual Arts, Museum of Modern Art in Rio de Janeiro
1989	Special reference from the jury of the II International Biennial of Cuenca, Ecuador
1990	Brasília Prize for Plastic Arts from the Brasília Museum of Art
1992	Eco Art Award, Rio de Janeiro Museum of Modern Art
2007	Chevalier des Arts et des Lettres awarded by the French government
2010	Order of Ipiranga granted by the Governor of São Paulo, José Serra
2016	Order of Cultural Merit – Commander Class

== Didactic activities ==
Year	Universities
1986/96	Taught and coordinated the Painting Department at the Parque Lage School of Visual Arts, Rio de Janeiro
1997	Tylers University, Philadelphia, USA - Visiting artist
1997	Wichita University, Kansas, USA - Visiting artist
1998	Yale University, New Haven, Connecticut, USA - Visiting artist
2005	Massachusetts College of Art, Boston, EUA - Visiting artist
2008	Special programs at Idyllwild Arts, Los Angeles, USA
2013	School of the Art Institute of Chicago, Illinois, EUA - Visiting artist
Year	Workshops
2016	MASP São Paulo Museum of Art – Drawing workshop, Children’s Stories
2017	Carpintaria, (Fortes D’Aloia & Gabriel), Rio de Janeiro – Children’s workshop, Marola, Mariola and Marilola
2018	Fondation Cartier pour l’art contemporain, Paris – Children’s workshop
2019	MASP São Paulo Museum of Art – Children’s workshop, The Circle and its Friends
2023	Incluzartiz Institute – Children’s Workshop
2023	Turner Contemporary, Margate, England – Children's workshop on the occasion of the exhibition Beatriz Milhazes: Maresias
2023	Cliftonville Cultural Centre, Margate, England.

Milhazes' paintings are in the permanent collections of the Museum of Modern Art, the Guggenheim, the Metropolitan Museum of Art, the picture Marotoloco (2014–25) is in the collection of the Pérez Art Museum Miami, the Banco Itaú, and the Museo Nacional Centro de Arte Reina Sofía.

Her 2000 painting "Meu Limão" "sold [in 2012] for $2.1 million dollars at Sotheby's in New York City, making her the highest-priced living Brazilian artist at auction."

Painting is the tree trunk of my developments, but other techniques have been playing a bold dialogue between them. An approach of new methods and techniques is very important for the evolving process of the studio practice. I also have an important body of work in special collage, screenprint, sculpture and set design. More recently developing murals and glass facades for public art projects. (Beatriz Milhazes, 2024)

== Technique ==
Marola (2015), National Museum of Women in the Arts, Washington, D.C.

In terms of technique, Milhazes is predominantly concerned with the principle of collage, drawing from her combined knowledge of both Latin American and European traditions. The cultural mixing of her native Brazil is something Milhazes is aware of and to some degree communicates in her paintings as well as being in ties with the Brazilian modernist movement. Milhazes many other influences come from her own fascination with the decorative arts, fashion, and geometry. Milhazes has described her own work in saying "I think of my work as geometric, yet I can't put everything into a square or a circle." Her self-developed process of art making came about during her extensive researching of printing processes in the 1980s.

A slow but steady process, time is key to everything for Milhazes. Many of her works start with the painting of plastic sheets, which are then glued to a canvas. These plastic sheets are then peeled off of the canvas like a decal leaving behind paint. Some of these plastic sheets have been reused by Milhazes for as long as ten years. Often if a particular motif or drawing is well liked by the artist it will be kept, repainted, and added to multiple compositions. She describes these pieces of plastic affectionately, stating that they are imprinted with a memory, a memory that can cause irregularities. These irregularities are happily accepted by Milhazes as something that just comes with her process. In her works, Beatriz focuses on achieving a smooth surface as opposed to visible brush strokes with thickness being an intriguing topic but far from integral to her work and its importance. In this way she can play with the various sheen and levels of contrast that her materials provide in an attempt to further transform her canvas. In her own words Milhazes likens her process to the working-class, saying "I tell my friends that I'm like a bank worker...I come to the studio five days a week and do my job. I pay attention to detail, and try not to make mistakes."

== Special projects ==
2004	"Gavea". "Brasil 40º" Project - Project created for the glass facade of the Selfridges & Co, Manchester, United Kingdom
2005/2006	"Peace and Love" - Vinyl panel created for Gloucester Road tube station - Platform for Art, London Underground, London, United Kingdom
2005/2007	"Guanabara" - Vinyl panel created for the Level 7 restaurant at Tate Modern, London, United Kingdom
2007	"O sonho" - Six panels created for the Taschen store in New York designed by Philippe Starck, USA
2008	"Bailinho" - Project created for the windows of one of the rooms of the Pinacoteca do Estado de São Paulo, Brazil
2008	"Maracolouco" - Project created for the glass facade of the Museum of Contemporary Art (MOT) - Tokyo, Japan
2008	"Gamboa" - Mobile created for Prospect.1, New Orleans-US Biennial, Inc. - Louisiana State Museum, USA
2009	"Casa de Baile e Samambaia" - Project created for the glass facade of the Fondation Cartier, Paris, France
2009/10	"American Seasons" - Wall-painting created for the K&amp;L Gates Center, Pittsburgh, Pennsylvania, USA
2010	"Arpoador" - Creation of a garden for the Garden Festival of the São Paulo Museum of Modern Art, Ibirapuera Park, São Paulo, Brazil
2010	"Saravá" - Project created for the glass facade of the Stephen Friedman gallery, London, United Kingdom
2010	"O Sol" - Ceramics created for the floor of the Fondation Beyeler, Basel, Switzerland
2011	"Aquarium" - Creation of a mobile for Atelier Cartier and Fondation Cartier pour l’Art Contemporain, France
2011	"Gamboa" - Mobile recreated for the Fondation Beyeler, Basel, Switzerland
2012	"Jardim Verde" - Creation of a panel for the Calouste Gulbenkian Foundation, Lisbon, Portugal
2012	"Joaquim Maria" - Curtain created for MALBA - Fundacion Costantini, Buenos Aires, Argentina
2013	"Gamboa I" - Mobile created for the Paço Imperial, Rio de Janeiro, RJ
2013/14	"Oceana Norte e Oceana Sul" - Ceramic mosaics created for two murals in the two towers of the Oceana Project, Key Biscayne by Eduardo Constantini, Miami USA.
2015/16	"Oilalá": - Vinyl panel created for Oi Futuro Flamengo, Rio de Janeiro
2016	"Gamboa II" – Mobile created for The Jewish Museum, New York, USA
2016/17	"Moon Love Dreaming" - Permanent project (wall-painting) developed for The Grace Farms Foundation – Nova Canaã/Connecticute, United States. The site's architectural design was developed by SANAA (Kazuyo Sejima and Ryue Nishizawa).
2016/17	"Tuiuti and Paquetá" – Permanent ceramic and wall-painting projects, respectively, developed for the driveway and lobby of New York Presbyterian Hospital.
2018/19	"Yellow Flower Dream" – work created for A-Art House, within the Art House Project, Inujima island, Japan.
2020	"Gamboa Seasons in La Jolla" – printed mural reproducing images from the Gamboa Seasons polyptico, part of La Jolla Murals, in the neighborhood of La Jolla, San Diego, CA. Opened in Jul 2020
2020	"Artycapucine LV" – Creation of an exclusive design for the Capucines bag, an icon of the brand. Launch Sep 2020
2021	"Safety Curtain Project", mip-museum in progress and Vienna Opera. 21 October 2021 to 30 June 2022.
2022	"O Esplendor" - Project created for the glass facade of the Long Museum, Shanghai, on the occasion of the exhibition Beatriz Milhazes: Ballet em Diagonais
2023	"O Esplendor" – Project created for the glass facade of Turner Contemporary, Margate, United Kingdom, on the occasion of the exhibition Beatriz Milhazes: Ballet em Diagonais

== Exhibitions ==
Milhazes has had solo and group exhibitions in a number of museums, including the Museum of Modern Art and the Musée d'Art Moderne de la Ville de Paris. From 4–21 July 2009, the Fondation Cartier pour l'art contemporain in Paris presented a major exhibition of her work.

Inspired by late Brazilian landscape architect Roberto Burle Marx, artist Beatriz Milhazes created Gamboa II, an installation suspended from the ceiling at the Jewish Museum in NYC from May 2016 to mid September 2016.

In 2015, Milhazes presented her first United States career survey at the Pérez Art Museum Miami, in Florida. Beatriz Milhazes: Jardim Botânico introduced the US audience to her large-scale pieces from the 1990s.

Year	Solo exhibitions
1985	Beatriz Milhazes: Pinturas. Galeria Cesar Aché, Rio de Janeiro (24 Sep to 11 Oct)
1987	Beatriz Milhazes: Pintura e Escultura. Galeria Cesar Aché, Rio de Janeiro (5 to 29 May)
1988	Beatriz Milhazes: Pinturas. Galeria Suzana Sassoun, São Paulo (24 May to 14 Jun)
1989	Beatriz Milhazes. Pasárgada Arte Contemporânea, Recife (7 Nov to 8 Dec)
1990	Beatriz Milhazes. Galeria Saramenha, Rio de Janeiro (21 Aug to 8 Sep)
1991	Beatriz Milhazes: Pinturas. Subdistrito Comercial de Arte, São Paulo (21 May to 15 Jun)
1993	Beatriz Milhazes: Pinturas recentes. Galeria Camargo Vilaça, São Paulo (10 Nov to 4 Dec)
1993	Beatriz Milhazes: Pinturas recentes. Sala Alternativa Artes Visuales, Caracas (September)
1994	Beatriz Milhazes. Galeria Ramis Barquet, Monterrey (3 Jun to 2 Jul)
1994	Beatriz Milhazes: Pinturas. Galeria Anna Maria Niemeyer, Rio de Janeiro (15 Sep to 1 Oct)
1994	Atelier Contemporâneo - Projeto FINEP. Paço Imperial, Rio de Janeiro (21 Nov to 8 Jan)
1995	Beatriz Milhazes. Dorothy Goldeen Gallery, Los Angeles (13 Jul to 26 Aug)
1996	Beatriz Milhazes. Edward Thorp Gallery, New York (9 Mar to 13 Apr)
1996	Beatriz Milhazes. Galeria Ismael Nery - Centro de Arte Calouste Gulbenkian, Rio de Janeiro (30 Jul to 16 Aug)
1996	Beatriz Milhazes. Camargo Vilaça Gallery, São Paulo (October)
1997	Beatriz Milhazes. Elba Benítez Galería, Madrid (22 May to 28 Jun)
1997	Beatriz Milhazes. Alfredo Andersen Museum, Curitiba (28 May to 22 Jun)
1997	Beatriz Milhazes: Recent Paintings. Edward Thorp Gallery, New York (15 November 1997 to 10 January 1998)
1997	Beatriz Milhazes. Barbara Faber Gallery, Amsterdam
1998	Beatriz Milhazes. Galerie Nathalie Obadia, Paris (25 Apr to 20 Jun)
1998	Beatriz Milhazes: Paintings. Anna Maria Niemeyer Gallery, Rio de Janeiro (November)
1998	Beatriz Milhazes: Screen Print. Paço Imperial, Rio de Janeiro (8 December 1997 to 28 February 1999)
1999	Beatriz Milhazes. Galerie Nathalie Obadia, Paris
1999	Beatriz Milhazes: Screenprints. Durham Press, Durham, PA (4 Oct to 31 Dec)
1999	Beatriz Milhazes. Exhibition Elba Benitez Gallery, Madrid
1999	Beatriz Milhazes. Stephen Friedman Gallery, London (29 Oct to 27 Nov)
2000	Beatriz Milhazes. Camargo Vilaça Gallery, São Paulo (6 to 27 Apr)
2000	Beatriz Milhazes: Recent Paintings. Edward Thorp Gallery, New York (19 Oct to 25 Nov)
2001	Beatriz Milhazes. Ikon Gallery, Birmingham (4 Apr to 13 May), traveled to Birmingham Museum of Art, Birmingham, AL (1 Jul to 2 Sep)
2001	Beatriz Milhazes. Pedro Cera Gallery, Lisbon (28 Sep to 3 Nov)
2001	Beatriz Milhazes. Elba Benítez Gallery, Madrid (13 Nov to 15 Dec)
2002	Beatriz Milhazes. Stephen Friedman Gallery, London (19 April to 18 May)
2002	"Mares do Sul". Banco do Brasil Cultural Center, Rio de Janeiro (29 October 2002 to 26 January 2003)
2002	"Coisa linda". The Museum of Modern Art (MOMA), New York (21 November 2002 to 13 January 2003)
2003	Beatriz Milhazes. Max Hetzler Gallery, Berlin (31 Jan to 15 Mar)
2003	Beatriz Milhazes. Domaine de Kerguéhennec, Center d’Art Contemporain, Bignan (5 Oct to 7 Dec)
2004	"Meu prazer". Fortes Vilaça Gallery, São Paulo (24 Apr to 15 May)
2004	Summertime. James Cohan Gallery, New York (22 Oct to 4 Dec)
2005	"Lagoa". Mezzanine of the Pampulha Art Museum, Belo Horizonte (9 Oct to 27 Nov)
2005	"Peace and Love". Gloucester Road Underground Station, London (22 Nov 2005 to 22 May 2006)
2005	"Joá". Stephen Friedman Gallery, London (25 Nov 2005 to 14 Jan 2006)
2006	"Pipoca moderna". Max Heztler Gallery, Berlin (28 Apr to 3 Jun)
2007	"New Prints". James Cohan Gallery, New York (9 to 31 Mar)
2007	Beatriz Milhazes. Fortes Vilaça Gallery, São Paulo (1 Dec 2007 to 26 Jan 2008)
2008	"Beatriz Milhazes: Gravuras". Pinacoteca of the State of São Paulo (6 Sep to 30 Nov)
2008	Beatriz Milhazes. James Cohan Gallery, New York (11 Oct to 15 Nov)
2009	Beatriz Milhazes. Fondation Cartier pour l’art contemporain, Paris (4 Apr to 21 Jun)
2010	"Beatriz Milhazes: Golden Roses Series". James Cohan Gallery, New York (1 Apr – 1 May)
2010	"Gravuras". Espírito Santo Art Museum Dionísio Del Santo (1 Jun to 29 Aug)
2010	Beatriz Milhazes. Stephen Friedman Gallery, London (11 Oct to 20 Nov)
2011	Beatriz Milhazes. Fondation Beyeler, Basel (29 Jan to 15 May)
2011	Beatriz Milhazes. Galerie Max Hetzler, Berlin (10 Sep to 5 Nov)
2011	"Beatriz Milhazes: Screenprints 1996–2011". Whitechapel Gallery at Windsor, Miami (3 December 2011 to 29 February 2012)
2012	"Quatro estações". Calouste Gulbenkian Foundation, Lisbon (17 Feb to 20 May)
2012	"Beatriz Milhazes: Gravuras" - Pinacoteca of the State of São Paulo Collection. Caixa Cultural, Rio de Janeiro (14 Aug to 30 Sep)
2012	"Panamericano". "Beatriz Milhazes: Pinturas 1999 - 2012". MALBA | Buenos Aires Latin American Art Museum, Buenos Aires (14 Sep to 7 Dec)
2012	"Um itinerário gráfico". SESC Quitandinha, Petrópolis, Rio de Janeiro (6 to 29 Jul), SESC Palmas, Tocantins (7 Aug to 5 Sep); SESC São Luís, Maranhão (4 to 31 Oct); SESC Santana, São Paulo (22 Nov 2012 to 24 Feb 2013); SESC Bauru, São Paulo (9 Jun to 23 Jul); SESC Palladium, Belo Horizonte, Minas Gerais (5 to 22 Sep); SESC Uberlândia, Minas Gerais (3 Oct to 10 Nov); SESC Teofilo Otoni, Minas Gerais (21 Nov 2013 to 6 Jan 2014); Murilo Mendes Art Museum, Juiz de Fora, Minas Gerais (17 Jan to 27 Feb); SESC Cabo Branco, João Pessoa, Paraíba (6 Jun to 31 Jul); SESC Arapiraca, Alagoas (10 Aug to 14 Sep); SESC Crato, Fortaleza, Ceará (7 Nov 2014 to 12 Jan 2015); SESC Iracema, Fortaleza, Ceará (3 Mar to 8 Apr 2015); SESC Garanhuns, Pernambuco (14 Jul to 2 October 2015); Centro Cultural Sesc Paraty/RJ (4 Mar to 24 Apr 2016); SESC - Morada dos Baís, Campo Grande (18 Apr to 16 Jun 2017); SESC Itajaí and Vale do Itajaí University (Univali) Espaço Multiuso, Itajaí (16 Jul to 26 Aug 2018); Santa Catarina Art Museum (MASC) - Integrated Culture Center, Florianópolis (4 December 2018 to 3 February 2019), UFRGS Cultural Center, Porto Alegre (19 Feb to 30 March 2019).
2013	"Beatriz Milhazes: Meu Bem". Paço Imperial, Rio de Janeiro (29 Aug to 27 Oct) traveled to MON Museu Oscar Niemeyer, Curitiba (21 Nov 2013 to 23 Feb 2014)
2013	"O Círculo e seus amigos". Fortes Vilaça Gallery, São Paulo (23 Nov 2013 to 24 Jan 2014)
2014	"Beatriz Milhazes: Jardim Botânico". Pérez Art Museum, Miami (19 Sep 2014 to 11 Jan 2015)
2015	"Coleção de Motivos". Unifor Cultural Space, Fortaleza (24 Feb to 28 Jun)
2015	Beatriz Milhazes. White Cube, Hong Kong (13 Mar to 30 May)
2015	"Marola". James Cohan Gallery, New York (22 Oct to 28 Nov)
2016	"Using Walls, Floors, and Ceilings: Beatriz Milhazes". The Jewish Museum, New York (6 May to 23 Oct)
2016	"Beatriz Milhazes: Marilola". Galerie Max Hetzler, Paris (17 Oct to 19 Nov)
2017	"Marola, Mariola and Marilola". Carpintaria (Fortes D’Aloia & Gabriel), Rio de Janeiro (20 May to 15 Jul)
2018	*Beatriz Milhazes: Rio Azul". White Cube Bermondsey, London (18 Apr to 1 Jul)
2020	"Beatriz Milhazes: Avenida Paulista". MASP - São Paulo Art Museum; Itaú Cultural. São Paulo (11 and 18 December 2020 to 30 May 2021)
2021	"Gabinete Beatriz Milhazes". São Paulo Museum of Art. São Paulo (25 June to 1 Aug)
2021	"Beatriz Milhazes: Ballet em Diagonais". Long Museum (West Bund), Shanghai. (30 Sep to 28 Nov)
2022	"Beatriz Milhazes: Mistura Sagrada". Pace Gallery, New York, USA. (15 Sep to 29 Oct)
2023	"Beatriz Milhazes: Maresias". Turner Contemporary, Margate, UK (27 May – 10 Sep)
2023	"Beatriz Milhazes: Paisagem em Desfile". Max Hetzler Gallery, Berlin (15 Sep – 28 Oct)

Year	Collective exhibition
1983	"Pintura, Pintura!", Fundação Casa de Rui Barbosa, Rio de Janeiro (11 to 24 Oct)
1983	“Pintura no Metrô”. Rio Metro Carioca Station, Rio de Janeiro
1983	6th National Visual Arts Salon. Museum of Modern Art of Rio de Janeiro (1 December 1983 to 15 January 1984)
1984	"Como vai você, Geração 80?" Parque Lage School of Visual Arts, Rio de Janeiro (14 Jul to 12 Aug)
1984	7th National Visual Arts Salon. Museum of Modern Art of Rio de Janeiro (7 December 1984 to 20 January 1985)
1984	"Arte na Rua II". 150 billboards between São Paulo, Rio de Janeiro and Brasília. Organization: São Paulo Museum of Contemporary Art - MAC/USP, São Paulo. (September)
1985	"Arte Construção". Business Center Gallery, Rio de Janeiro (9 December 1985 to 19 January 1986)
1985	8th National Visual Arts Salon. Museum of Modern Art of Rio de Janeiro (13 December 1985 to 2 February 1986)
1985	International Youth Art, 85 University. Kobe, Japan.
1986	"Pinturas". UFF art gallery, Niterói (30 Apr to 25 May)
1986	"Novas Impressões". GB Arte, Rio de Janeiro (April)
1986	"Território Ocupado" Parque Lage School of Visual Arts, Rio de Janeiro (13 December 1986 to 11 January 1987)
1986	"Pinturas". El Escrete Volador, Guadalajara
1987	"Atelier 78 em 87". Central Bank of Brazil Art Space, Rio de Janeiro (17 to 27 May)
1987	5th São Paulo Salon of Contemporary Art. Pinacoteca do Estado de São Paulo, São Paulo (29 Oct to 29 Nov)
1988	10th National Visual Arts Salon. FUNARTE – National Art Foundation, Rio de Janeiro (25 Mar to 28 Apr)
1988	"Subindo a Serra". Palace of Arts, Belo Horizonte (20 Jul to 5 Aug)
1988	"Dois a Dois". Gallery of the Argentinean Consulate, Rio de Janeiro
1989	II Cuenca International Biennial. Museum of Modern Art, Ecuador (2 Jun to 3 Aug)
1989	"O Mestre à Mostra". Parque Lage School of Visual Arts, Rio de Janeiro (8 to 30 Jul)
1989	"Rio Hoje". Museum of Modern Art of Rio de Janeiro – MAM, Rio de Janeiro (25 Oct to 3 Dec)
1989	Cristina Canale, Cláudio Fonseca, Beatriz Milhazes, Luiz Pizzarro and Luiz Zerbini. Museum of Contemporary Art - MAC/USP, São Paulo, traveled to Funarte – Galeria Rodrigo Mello Franco de Andrade, Rio de Janeiro (18 Jan to 9 Feb)
1990	"O Rosto e a Obra nº 9". IBEU Art Gallery, Rio de Janeiro (9 Jan to 23 Feb)
1990	"Projeto Arqueos". Fundição Progresso, Rio de Janeiro (20 to 30 Aug - Creation process open to the public) (30 Aug to 2 Sep - Exhibition)
1990	Brasília Prize for Plastic Arts 1990. Brasília Art Museum – MAB, Brasília (25 Oct to 25 Nov)
1991	"Brazil: La Nueva Generación". Fine Arts Museum, Caracas (11 Apr to 19 May)
1991	"BR/80: Pintura Brasil Década 80". Fundação Casa França Brasil, Rio de Janeiro (2 Jul to 4 Aug)
1992	"Eco Art". Museum of Modern Art of Rio de Janeiro – MAM, Rio de Janeiro (5 to 30 Jun)
1992	"Ciertos Signos Americanos". Alternative Visual Arts Room, Caracas (November)
1992	Brazilian Contemporary Art. Galeria Rodrigo Mello Franco IBAC | Sérgio Milliet Gallery | Parque Lage School of Visual Arts, Rio de Janeiro (26 Nov to 15 Dec)
1992	"João Satamini/Subdistrito". Casa das Rosas, São Paulo (26 Nov 1992 to 17 Jan 1993)
1992	"A Caminho de Niterói" – João Leão Sattamini Collection. Paço Imperial, Rio de Janeiro (12 December 1992 to 14 February 1993)
1993	"Coletiva de Gravuras". Espaço Namour, São Paulo (18 Mar to 18 Apr)
1993	"Ultramodern, The Art of Contemporary Brazil". The National Museum of Women in the Arts, Washington, D.C. (2 Apr to 1 Aug)
1993	"Brasil Contemporâneo". Casa da Imagem, Curitiba (15 Apr to 15 May)
1993	"A Caminho do Museu". São Paulo Cultural Center, São Paulo (13 May to 6 Jun)
1993	"FIA 93 – II Iberoamerican Art Fair" | World Gallery. Alternative Visual Arts Room | Camargo Vilaça Gallery, Caracas (8 to 13 Jun)
1993	"Guignard: A Escolha do Artista". Paço Imperial, Rio de Janeiro (20 Aug to 26 Sep)
1993	"O Papel do Rio". Paço Imperial, Rio de Janeiro (16 Sep to 14 Nov)
1993	"Arte Moderna Brasileira na Coleção Gilberto Chateaubriand". Rio de Janeiro Museum of Modern Art - MAM, Rio de Janeiro
1993	"Encontros e Tendências". Museum of Contemporary Art at the University of São Paulo – MAC USP, São Paulo
1994	"Pequeño Formato Latinoamericano - 94". Luigi Marrozzini Gallery, San Juan (March)
1994	"Slant of Light: International Art Exhibition", Art New York International. Pier 92, New York (27 Apr to 1 May)
1994	"The Exchange Show: Twelve Painters" from San Francisco and Rio de Janeiro. Center for the Arts, Yerba Buena Gardens, San Francisco (23 Jun to 28 Aug), traveled to Museu de Arte Moderna do Rio de Janeiro – MAM, Rio de Janeiro (6 Oct to 19 Nov)
1994	"Dialogo sobre siete puntos: Encuentro Interamericano de Artes Plásticas". Guadalajara Museum
1994	"Colectiva: Pintura 94". Sala Alternativa Artes Visuales Caracas, Venezuela
1995	"Regards d’Amérique Latine". Galerie d’Art Actuel Regard, Genève (4 May to 30 Jun)
1995	"Transatlantica: The America-Europa non representativa". Alejandro Otero Museum, Caracas (9 Jul to 8 Oct)
1995	"Panorama da arte Brasileira". São Paulo Museum of Modern Art (24 Oct to 26 Nov), traveled to Rio de Janeiro Museum of Modern Art (6 December 1995 to 21 January 1996)
1995	"Décimo Quarto Arte Pará". Romulo Maiorana Gallery, Belém (September)
1995	"Carnegie International 1995". The Carnegie Museum of Art, Pittsburgh (26 November 1995 to 27 January 1996)
1995	"52nd Carnegie International". Carnegie Museum of Art, Pittsburgh (5 November 1995 to 18 February 1996)
1995	"Anos 80: O Palco da Diversidade". Rio de Janeiro Museum of Modern Art, Rio de Janeiro; traveled to SESI Art Gallery, São Paulo Galeria Camargo Vilaça, São Paulo
1996	"Entretelas" – Iole de Freitas, Beatriz Milhazes, Eliane Duarte. Alejandro Otero Museum, Caracas (4 Aug to 3 Oct)
1996	"Impressões Itinerantes". Palace of Arts, Belo Horizonte (4 to 26 Sep)
1996	"O Excesso". Paço das Artes, São Paulo (24 Sep to 10 Dec)
1996	"Arte Contemporânea Brasileira na Coleção João Sattamini". Museum of Contemporary Art of Niterói (2 Sep 1996 to 14 Sep 1997)
1996	"Ouro de Artista". Casa Triângulo, São Paulo (29 Nov to 14 Dec)
1996	Theories of the Decorative. Baumgartner Galleries Inc., Washington.
1996	"Brasil Contemporaneo". House of Latin America, Madrid
1996	"Pequenas Mãos". Paço Imperial/MinC IPHAN, Rio de Janeiro, traveled to Centro Cultural Alumni, São Paulo
1997	"New Editions and Works on Paper". Betsy Senior Gallery, New York (1 Mar to 26 Apr)
1997	"Theories of the Decorative: Abstraction and Ornament in Contemporary Painting". Inverleith House, Royal Botanic Garden, Edinburgh (9 Aug to 5 Oct); traveled to Edwin A. Ulrich Museum of Art, Wichita State University, Wichtia (30 Oct to 30 Dec)
1998	"Desde el cuerpo: alegorias de lo femenino", Fundacion Museo de Bellas Artes, Caracas, Venezuela (Jan to Mar)
1998	"16º Salão Nacional de Artes Plásticas". Museum of Modern Art of Rio de Janeiro (13 Jan to 15 Feb) traveled to Centro de Artes da Funarte, Rio de Janeiro (12 Mar to 16 Apr)
1998	"Decorative Strategies". Center for Curatorial Studies, Bard College, Annandale-on-Hudson, NY (5 to 19 Apr)
1998	"Hanging – Contemporary Painting". Camargo Vilaça Gallery, São Paulo (4 to 28 May)
1998	"Paisagem Urbana Contemporânea". São Paulo Museum of Modern Art (28 Apr to 10 May)
1998	"Der brasilianische Blick / Um Olhar Brasileiro: Sammlung Gilberto Chateaubriand". Haus der Kulturen der Welt, Berlin (3 Jul to 13 Sep) traveled to Ludwig Forum fur Internationale Kunst, Aachen (22 Oct to 29 Nov 29); Kunstmuseum Heidenheim (13 December 1998 to 31 January 1999)
1998	"Painting Language". LA Louver, Los Angeles (5 Aug to 5 Sep)
1998	"Os Anos 80". Marina Potrich Art Gallery, Goiânia (3 to 26 Sep)
1998	"Every Day 98". 11th Biennale of Sydney (18 Sep to 8 Nov)
1998	"Camargo Vilaça Bis 46". Camargo Vilaça Gallery, São Paulo (28 Sep to 26 Oct)
1998	"Abstract Painting, Once Removed". Contemporary Arts Museum Houston, Houston (3 Oct to 6 Dec) traveled to Kemper Museum of Contemporary Art, Kansas (23 April 1999 to 18 July 1999)
1998	"Arte Contemporânea Brasileira: um e/entre outro/s". XXIV São Paulo International Biennial, Ciccillo Matarazzo Pavilion – Ibirapuera Park (3 Oct to 13 Dec)
1998	"O Moderno e o Contemporâneo na Arte Brasileira: Coleção Gilberto Chateaubriand" – MAM/RJ. São Paulo Museum of Art - MASP, São Paulo (6 Oct to 13 Dec)
1998	"Espelho da Bienal". Museum of Contemporary Art of Niterói (10 Oct to 18 Jun)
1998	"Durham Press 10th Anniversary Exhibition". Marcel Sitcoske Gallery, San Francisco (3 December 1998, 23 January 1999)
1998	"O Trio - Senise, Milhazes, Venosa". Sala Alternativa Gallery, Caracas, Venezuela
1999	"Women Printmakers". Jim Kempner Gallery, New York (6 Mar to 11 Apr)
1999	"O Objeto Anos 90". Itaú Cultural, São Paulo (7 Apr to 30 May)
1999	"Recent Prints". Betsy Senior Gallery, New York (17 Apr to 5 Jun)
1999	"Impressões Contemporâneas" - Rio Gravura Exhibition. Paço Imperial, Rio de Janeiro, (11 Sep to 11 Oct)
1999	"New Painting". Nathalie Obadia Gallery, Paris (27 Nov 1999 to 10 Jan 2000)
1999	"A imagem do som de Chico Buarque". Paço Imperial, Rio de Janeiro (2 December 1999 to 5 March 2000)
1999	"Transvanguarda Latino Americana". Culturguest, Lisbon
2000	"Projects 70: Jim Hodges, Beatriz Milhazes, Faith Ringgold". Museum of Modern Art, New York (1 May to 31 Oct)
2000	"12ª Mostra de Gravura de Curitiba – Marcas do corpo, dobras da alma". Curitiba Cultural Foundation. Curitiba (6 Jun to 8 Aug)
2000	"Opulent". Cheim & Read Gallery, New York (14 Jun to 1 Sep)
2000	"Rosas e rosas". Casa das Rosas, São Paulo (22 Aug to 17 Sep)
2000	"Furnished Paintings". OMR Gallery, Mexico (14 November 2000 to 13 January 2001)
2000	"Drawings". Stephen Friedman Gallery, London (7 Dec 2000 to 17 January 2001)
2000	"F[r]icciones: Versiones del Sur". Museo Nacional Centro de Arte Reina Sofia, Madrid (12 Dec 2000 to 25 Mar 2001)
2000	"Universal Abstraction 2000". Jan Weiner Gallery, Kansas City
2001	"Hybrids - International Contemporary Painting". Tate Liverpool (6 Apr to 24 Jun)
2001	"Trajetória da Luz". Itaú Cultural, São Paulo (13 May to 9 Sep)
2001	"Chicago". Camargo Vilaça Gallery
2001	"Espelho cego" - Selection of a Contemporary Collection. São Paulo Museum of Modern Art (10 Aug to 9 Sep), traveled to Paço Imperial, Rio de Janeiro (3 May to 10 Jun)
2001	"Operativo". Museo Tamayo Arte Contemporáneo, Mexico (23 Aug to 18 Nov)
2001	"Cultura Brasileira 1". Casa das Rosas, São Paulo (21 Sep to 11 Nov)
2001	"Rotativa – Fase 1". Galeria Fortes Vilaça, São Paulo (12 Dec 1998 to 18 Jan 2002)
2001	"Viva a Arte Brasileira". Rio de Janeiro Museum of Modern Art, Rio de Janeiro
2001	"Posters of the Years to Come". Kunst Portfolio, Vienna
2002	"Urgent Painting". Musée d’Art Moderne de la Ville de Paris, Paris (17 Jan to 3 Mar)
2002	"Paralela". Exhibition parallel to the XXV São Paulo International Biennial, São Paulo (3 Mar to 28 Apr)
2002	"Polly Apfelbaum, Black Flag, Beatriz Milhazes, Cravo e a Rosa". D’Amélio Terras Gallery, New York (6 Apr to 24 May)
2002	"Diálogo, Antagonismo e Replicação na Coleção Sattamini". Museum of Contemporary Art of Niterói – MAC, Niterói (11 May to 7 Jul)
2002	"Coleção Metrópolis de Arte Contemporânea". Pinacoteca do Estado de São Paulo (20 Jan to 31 Mar), traveled to Espaço Cultural CPFL, Campinas (13 May 2004 to 18 Jul 2004)
2002	"Caminhos do Contemporâneo". Paço Imperial, Rio de Janeiro (10 Jul to 6 Oct)
2002	"O Mapa do Agora: Recent Brazilian Art in the João Sattamini Collection of the Niterói Museum of Contemporary Art". Instituto Tomie Ohtake, São Paulo (21 Aug to 3 Nov)
2002	"Arquipélagos: The plural universe of MAM". Museum of Modern Art of Rio de Janeiro – MAM, Rio de Janeiro (18 Oct to 1 Dec)
2002	"Ópera Aberta: Celebração". Casa das Rosas, São Paulo (22 Oct to 30 Nov)
2002	"Fragmentos a seu ímã - MAB masterpieces". Venâncio Contemporary Cultural Space – ECCO, Brasília (21 Dec 2002 to 31 Jan 2003)
2003	"2080". São Paulo Museum of Modern Art (24 Jan to 5 Apr)
2003	"Meus amigos". MAM Space – Villa Lobos, São Paulo (22 May to 19 Jul)
2003	"Shattered Dreams: Sonhos despedaçados" - Beatriz Milhazes | Rosângela Rennó.
2003	"Padiglione Brasile" – 50th Biennale di Venezia (15 Jun to 2 Nov)
2003	"Heisskalt | Aktuelle Malerei aus der Sammlung Scharpff". Hamburger Kunsthalle, Hamburg (7 Nov 2003 to 29 Feb 2004), traveled to Staatsgalerie Stuttgart, Stuttgart (20 Mar to 13 Jun)
2004	"Carnaval". Banco do Brasil Cultural Center, Rio de Janeiro (27 Jan to 28 Mar)
2004	"MoMA at El Museo: Latin American and Caribbean Art from the Collection of the Museum of Modern Art". El Museo del Barrio, New York (4 Mar to 25 Jul)
2004	"Natureza-Morta" | "Still Life". SESI Cultural Center Art Gallery, São Paulo (2 Apr to 17 Nov)
2004	"OPTIMO: Manifestations of Optimism in Contemporary Art". Ballroom Marfa, Texas (23 Apr to 27 Jun)
2004	"Between The Lines". James Cohan Gallery, New York (7 May to 12 Jun)
2004	"Onde está você, Geração 80?". Banco do Brasil Cultural Center, Rio de Janeiro (12 Jul to 26 Sep)
2004	Contemporary Brazilian Art in the Collections of Rio. Museum of Modern Art of Rio de Janeiro – MAM, Rio de Janeiro (27 Jul to 3 Oct)
2004	"Estrategias Barrocas: Arte Contemporáneo Brasileño". Metropolitan Cultural Center, Quito (29 Jul to 5 Sep)
2004	"Flower as Image: From Monet to Jeff Koons". Louisiana Museum, Humlebæk (10 Sep, 2004 to 16 Jan, 2005)
2004	XXVI São Paulo International Biennial. Ciccillo Matarazzo Pavilion, Ibirapuera Park, São Paulo (26 Sep to 19 Dec)
2004	"Paralela 2004" – An exhibition of contemporary art. Exhibition parallel to the XXVI São Paulo International Biennial, São Paulo (26 Sep to 14 Nov)
2004	"As Bienais": A look at Brazilian production 1951/2002. Galeria Bergamin, São Paulo (23 Sep to 13 Nov)
2004	"The Encounters in the 21st Century: Polyphony—Emerging Resonances". 21st Century Museum of Contemporary Art, Kanazawa (9 October 2004 to 21 March 2005)
2005	"Arte em Metrópolis". Tomie Ohtake Institute, São Paulo (25 Feb to 17 Apr), traveled to Museu Oscar Niemeyer, Curitiba (11 Jun to 21 Aug)
2005	"Blumen mythos: von Vincent van Gogh bis Jeff Koons". Fondation Beyeler, Basel (27 Feb to 22 May)
2005	"10th Anniversary Exhibition". Stephen Friedman Gallery, London (29 Mar to 23 Apr)
2005	"Works on Paper". Galerie Max Hetzler, Berlin (6 May to 25 Jun)
2005	"POPulence". Blaffer Gallery, The Art Museum of the University of Houston (25 Jun to 27 Aug), traveled to Museum of Contemporary Art Cleveland (15 Sep to 20 Dec); Southeastern Center for Contemporary Art, Winston-Salem (21 January 2006 to 2 April 2006)
2005	24th Arte Pará 2005 Contemporary. Rômulo Maiorana Foundation, Belém
2006	"É HOJE na arte brasileira contemporânea: Gilberto Chateaubriand Collection". Santander Banespa Cultural Center, Rio de Janeiro (15 Feb to 28 Mar)
2006	"Since 2000: Printmaking Now". Print Galleries - Museum of Modern Art, New York, (3 May to 18 Sep)
2006	"Dear Friends". Domaine de Kerguéhennec, Center d’Art Contemporain, Bignan (1 Jul to 1 Oct)
2006	"Clube da gravura" - 20 years. São Paulo Museum of Modern Art - MAM, São Paulo (5 Jul to 10 Sep)
2006	A Century of Brazilian Art - Gilberto Chateubriand Collection. Pinacoteca do Estado de São Paulo (9 Jul to 13 Aug), traveled to Museu de Arte Moderna do Rio de Janeiro (1 Sep to 12 Nov); Oscar Niemeyer Museum, Curitiba (29 November 2006 to 4 March 2007); Museum of Modern Art of Bahia (21 Mar to 29 April 29, 2007); Santa Catarina Art Museum (22 May to 15, 2007)
2006	Untitled, 2006. Leased by Eduardo Brandão and Jan Fjeld. São Paulo Museum of Modern Art – MAM, São Paulo (27 Jul to 10 Sep)
2006	"Manobras Radicais: Artistas Brasileiras [1886–2005]". Banco do Brasil Cultural Center, São Paulo (8 Aug to 15 Oct)
2006	*6th Shanghai Biennale - Hyper Design. Shanghai Art Museum, Shanghai (6 Sep to 5 Nov)
2006	"MAM[NA]OCA: Brazilian Art in the collection of the São Paulo Museum of Modern Art". São Paulo Museum of Modern Art (2 Oct to 10 Dec)
2006	"Off the Shelf: New Forms in Contemporary Artists’ Books". The Frances Lehman Loeb Art Center, Vassar College, Poughkeepsie/NY (6 Oct to 17 Dec)
2006	"Deuses Gregos em Templos Contemporâneos". Museum of Contemporary Art of Niterói - MAC (19 Dec 2006 to 25 Mar 2007)
2007	Itaú Contemporary Collection: Art in Brazil from 1981 to 2006. Itaú Cultural, São Paulo (21 Mar to 27 May)
2007	"80/90 Modernos, Pós-Modernos, etc". Tomie Ohtake Institute, São Paulo (25 May to 15 Jul)
2007	"What Is Painting?". Contemporary Art from the Collection. Museum of Modern Art, New York (7 Jul to 17 Sep)
2007	"Cardinal Points" | "Puntos Cardinales: A Survey of Contemporary Latino and Latin American Art from the Sprint Nextel Art Collection". Art Museum of South Texas,
2007	"Corpus Christi", Texas (27 October 2007 to 6 January 2008), traveled to Latino Cultural Center, Dallas, Texas (2 Feb to 15 April 2008); The Alameda National Center for Latino Arts and Culture, Santo Antonio, Texas (11 May to 22 July 2008); Southeast Missouri State University, Cape Girardeau, MO (11 May to 22 July 2008), Pensacola Museum of Art, Pensacola, Florida (15 Aug to 25 October 2008), William D. Cannon Art Gallery, Carlsbad, California (1 Mar to 10 May 2009), Charles H. MacNider Museum, Mason City, Iowa (30 May to 10 August 2009), Baum Gallery, University of Central Arkansas, Conway, Arkansas (5 Sep to 16 November 2009)
2007	"PostDec: Beyond Pattern an Decoration". Joseloff Gallery, Hartford Art School, University of Hartford, New York (9 Nov to 23 Dec)
2007	Brazilian Painting in the Collection of the São Paulo Museum of Modern Art - MAM. Espírito Santo Art Museum – MAES, Dionísio Del Santo (18 December 2007 to 30 March 2008)
2007	"70 anos do IPHAN – Instituto do Patrimônio Histórico e Artístico Nacional". Paço Imperial/MinC IPHAN, Rio de Janeiro
2008	"*Quando vidas se tornam forma: dialogue with the future Brazil/Japan". Museum of Modern Art of São Paulo, São Paulo (10 Apr to 22 Jun)
2008	"Between Art and Life: The Contemporary Painting and Sculpture Collection". San Francisco Museum of Art, San Francisco (10 May 2009 to 3 January 2010)
2008	"Arte Contemporânea Brasileira"– Credit Suisse Donation. Pinacoteca Station, São Paulo (19 Jun to 17 Aug)
2008	"Geografías (In)visibles – Arte contemporáneo latinoamericano en la Colección Patricia Phelps de Cisneros". Eduardo León Jimenes Cultural Center, Santiago de los Caballeros (26 Jun to 21 Sep)
2008	"Order. Desire. Light: An Exhibition of Contemporary Drawings". Irish Museum of Modern Art, Dublin (25 Jul to 19 Oct)
2008	"The Tropics – Views from the Middle of the Globe". Martin-Gropius-Bau, Berlin (12 Sep 2008 to 5 Jan 2009)
2008	"Collection II". 21st Century Museum of Contemporary Art, Kanazawa (13 September 2008 to 12 April 2009)
2008	"When Lives Become Form" – Contemporary Brazilian Art, 1960s to the Present. Museum of Contemporary Art, Tokyo (22 October 2008 to 12 January 2009), traveled to Yerba Buena Center For The Arts, San Francisco (5 November 2009 to 31 January 2010)
2008	"Prospect. 1". New Orleans. Louisiana State Museum New Orleans – The Old U.S. Mint, New Orleans (1 November 2008 to 18 January 2009)
2008	"Demons, Yarns & Tales Tapestries" by Contemporary Artists. The Dairy, London (10 to 22 Nov), traveled to Design Miami, Miami (2 to 6 Dec); James Cohan Gallery, New York (8 January 2009 to 13 February 2009)
2009	"Drawings: A–Z". City Museum, Lisbon (6 Feb to 29 Mar)
2009	"Era uma vez... Arte conta histórias do mundo". Banco do Brasil Cultural Center, São Paulo (21 Apr to 21 Jun)
2009	"200 Artworks 25 Years: Artists’ Editions for Parkett". 21st Century Museum of Contemporary Art, Kanazawa (4 to 26 Sep), traveled to Singapore Tyler Print Institute - STPI, Singapore (22 May 2010 to 17 Jul 2010); Seoul Arts Center | Hangaram Museum, Seoul (17 December 2010 to 25 February 2011)
2009	"Matisse hoje". Pinacoteca do Estado de São Paulo, São Paulo (5 Sep to 1 Nov)
2010	"Forma (ação) gráfica: The experience of EAV Parque Lage: Parque Lage School of Visual Arts, Rio de Janeiro (26 Mar to 13 Jun)
2010	"40". Texas Gallery, Houston, Texas (15 Jun to 31 Jul)
2010	MAM Garden Festival in Ibirapuera. Museum of Modern Art of São Paulo –MAM, São Paulo (22 Sep to 31 Dec)
2011	"Ordem e Progresso: Vontade Construtiva na Arte Brasileira". São Paulo Museum of Modern Art (27 Jan to 3 Apr)
2011	"Mulheres, Artistas e Brasileiras". Palácio do Planalto, Praça dos Três Poderes, Brasília (24 Mar to 5 May)
2011	"Vestígios de Brasilidade". Santander Cultural, Recife (5 May to 31 Jul)
2011	"A Giant by Thine Own Nature". IVAM - Institut Valencià d’Arte Modern, Valencia (31 May to 17 Jul)
2011	"Mathématiques, a Beautiful Elsewhere". Fondation Cartier pour l’Art Contemporain, Paris (21 Oct 2011 to 18 Mar 2012)
2012	"Mulheres nas coleções João Sattamini e MAC de Niterói". Museum of Contemporary Art of Niterói (24 Mar to 29 Apr)
2012	"1911-2011 Arte Brasileira e depois, in the Itaú Collection". Paço Imperial, Rio de Janeiro (Jan to Feb)
2012	"Cartier Joaillier des Arts". Fondation Cartier pour l’Art Contemporain, Paris (3 to 21 Apr)
2012	"Gravura Brasileira no acervo da Pinacoteca de São Paulo: 100 Anos de História". Pinacoteca do Estado de São Paulo (21 Apr to 26 Oct)
2012	"Eco Art". Municipal Center of Culture Dr. Henrique Ordovás Filho, Caxias do Sul (19 Jul to 11 Aug)
2012	"Anna Maria Niemeyer, um caminho". Paço Imperial, Rio de Janeiro (Dec 112, 2012 to 17 February 2013)
2012	"BGA Collection: Brazil Golden Art". MuBE - Brazilian Sculpture Museum, São Paulo (14 to 27 Dec)
2013	"Trajetórias": Brazilian Art in the Edson Queiroz Foundation Collection—UNIFOR 40 years. Unifor Cultural Space, Fortaleza (21 Mar to 8 Dec)
2013	Brazilian Contemporary Art from the 1950s to the present day. Multiarte Gallery, Fortaleza (17 May to 13 Jul)
2013	"Joiart". Shopping Fashion Mall. Rio de Janeiro (21 to 28 May)
2013	"30 x Biennial": Transformations in Brazilian art from the 1st to the 30th edition. São Paulo Biennial Pavilion (21 Sep to 8 Dec)
2013	"Remember Everything - 40 years". Galerie Max Hetzler, Berlin (10 Oct to 21 Dec)
2014	"140 Caracteres". São Paulo Museum of Modern Art, São Paulo (28 Jan to 16 Mar)
2014	"Cruzamentos: Contemporary Art in Brazil". Wexner Center for the Arts, Columbus (1 Feb to 20 Apr)
2014	"Um olhar sobre a coleção". Inst. Cultural Usiminas, Ipatinga. Minas Gerais (Mar to Apr)
2014	"A tara por livros ou a tara de papel". Bergamin & Gomide Gallery, São Paulo (18 Mar to 17 Apr)
2014	"Unbound: Contemporary Art After Frida Kahlo". Museum of Contemporary Art Chicago (3 May to 5 Oct)
2014	"Mémoires Vives: 30 years Fondation Cartier pour l’art contemporain". Fondation Cartier pour l’art contemporain, Paris (10 May to 21 Sep)
2014	"Inventário da Paixão – Homenagem a Marcantonio Vilaça". National Historical Museum, Rio de Janeiro (29 May to 13 Jul)
2014	"Beauty Reigns: A Baroque Sensibility in Recent Painting". McNay Art Museum, San Antonio, TX (11 Jun to 17 Aug), traveled to Akron Art Museum, Akron, OH (4 January 2005 to 3 May)
2014	"Alimentário" | Art and Construction of Brazilian Food Heritage. Rio de Janeiro Museum of Modern Art (11 Jun to 10 Aug) traveled to OCA - Pavilhão Lucas Nogueira Garcez, São Paulo (25 Jan 2005 to 29 Mar); Expo Milano 2015 - Brazilian Pavilion, Milan (1 May 2015 to 31 Oct)
2014	"Gorgeous". Asian Art Museum, San Francisco (20 Jun to 14 Sep)
2014	"Tatu: Futebol, Adversidade e Cultura da Caatinga". Rio MAR Art Museum, Rio de Janeiro (15 Jun to 19 Oct)
2014	"The Fifth Season". James Cohan Gallery, New York (26 Jun to 8 Aug)
2014	"Histórias do acervo MON" – open. Oscar Niemeyer Museum, Curitiba. (Jul to Dec)
2014	"Abstrações": Fundação Edson Queiroz Collection and Roberto Marinho Collection. Unifor Cultural Space | University of Fortaleza, Fortaleza (18 Jul 2014 to 11 Jan 2015)
2014	Cool Place: Sammlung Scharpff Collection. Kunstmuseum Stuttgart (26 Jul to 16 Nov)
2014	"Histórias Mestiças". Instituto Tomie Ohtake, São Paulo (16 Aug to 5 Oct)
2014	Pinacoteca's plastic collection: conservation and restoration issues. Research work on plastic materials at the Pinacoteca Conservation and Restoration Center, Pinacoteca do Estado de São Paulo, São Paulo (30 Aug to 14 Dec)
2014	"Big Picture Show". International Print Center New York, New York (8 Sep to 5 Dec)
2014	"Made by… Feito por Brasileiros", Cidade Matarazzo, Bela Vista, São Paulo (9 Sep–12 Oct 2015)
2014	"Afetividades Eletivas" – Luiz Sérgio Arantes Collection. Art Gallery of the Minas Tênis Clube Cultural Center, in Belo Horizonte (3 December 2014 to 2 March 2015)
2015	"Southern Exposure: 5 Brazilian Artists". Galerie Maximillian, Aspen (16 Jan to 15 Feb)
2015	"Apreensões: Objetos do Desejo". National Museum of Fine Arts, Rio de Janeiro (13 Jan to ?)
2015	"Artists For Ikon". Ikon Gallery, Birmingham, (24 Apr to 4 May)
2015	"Geração 80 - Ousadia e Afirmação". Simões de Assis Art Gallery, Curitiba (18 Jun to 1 Aug)
2015	"Twentieth Anniversary Exhibition". Stephen Friedman, London. (13 Jun to 31 Jul)
2015	10th Mercosul Biennial Message of a New America. Neobaroque Anthropophagy Exhibition, Santander Cultural, Porto Alegre (8 Oct to 22 Nov)
2015	"Grace Farms Art Project". The Grace Farms Foundation, New Canaan (9 Oct to 11 Nov)
2015	"Uma Coleção Particular?". Contemporary Art in the Pinacoteca Collection. Pinacoteca do Estado de São Paulo, São Paulo (20 Nov 2015 to 31 Jan 2016)
2015	"Ocupação Artística: Sempre Seu". Oi Futuro Flamengo, Rio de Janeiro (7 Dec 2015 to 21 Feb 2016)
2016	"Tertúlia". Galeria Fortes Vilaça, São Paulo (28 Jan to 27 Feb)
2016	Airton Queiroz Collection, Espaço Cultural Unifor, Fortaleza (15 Jun to 18 Dec)
2016	"Entreolhares, poéticas d’alma brasileira". Afro Brasil Museum, São Paulo (18 June to 7 Aug)
2016	"Clube de Gravura: 30 anos". Museum of Modern Art (MAM-SP), São Paulo (20 Jun to 21 Aug)
2016	Official Collection of Rio 2016 Olympic Posters, Museum of Tomorrow, Rio de Janeiro (13 Jul to 25 Aug)
2016	"Cor do Brasil". Rio Art Museum (MAR), Rio de Janeiro (2 Aug to 15 Jan 2017)
2016	"Tudo Joia", Galeria Bergamin & Gomide, São Paulo (27 Oct to 26 Nov)
2017	"Vanishing Points". James Cohan Gallery, New York. (23 Mar to 22 Apr)
2017	MAM collections. Resende Museum of Modern Art, Resende (18 Mar to 28 Apr)
2017	"Highlights - La Collection de la Fondation Cartier Pour L’Art contemporain". SEMA - Seoul Museum of Art (30 May – 15 Aug)
2017	"Roberto Burle Marx: Brazilian Modernist", Kunsthalle by Deutsche Bank, Berlin, Germany (7 Jul to 3 Oct)
2017	A century of Brazilian Art in the Edson Queiroz Foundation Collection. Sobral Cultural House, Sobral. Ceará (18 Jul to 7 Oct)
2017	"Past/Future/Present: Contemporary Brazilian Art from the Museum of Modern Art", São Paulo, Phoenix Museum of Art, Phoenix (1 Sep to 31 Dec)
2018	Fondation Cartier pour l’art contemporain, A Beautiful Elsewhere, Power Station of Art, Shanghai (25 Apr to 29 Jul)
2018	"Remembering Tomorrow: Artworks and Archives", White Cube Gallery, Hong Kong (18 Jul to 25 Aug)
2018	"Géométries Américaines, Du Mexique à la Terre de Feu", Fondation Cartier pour l’art contemporain, Paris (12 Oct 2018 to 24 Feb 2019)
2018	"Mulheres na Coleção MAR", Museu de Arte do Rio (MAR), Rio de Janeiro (16 October 2018 to 4 April 2019)
2018	"Memory Palace", White Cube Gallery Bermondsey, London (11 Jul to 2 Sep)
2019	"Passado/futuro/presente: arte contemporânea brasileira no acervo do MAM", São Paulo Museum of Modern Art (MAM), São Paulo (22 Jan to 21 Jul)
2019	"Campo", Parque Lage, Rio de Janeiro (25 Aug to 20 Oct).
2019	"James Cohan: Twenty Years", James Cohan Gallery, NY, USA (1 Nov – 20 Dec)
2020	"Color & Complexity: 30 Years at Durham Press", Allentown Art Museum, Pennsylvania, USA (19 Jan – 3 May)
2020	"Collective constellation: selections from the Eileen Harris Norton collection", Art + Practice, Los Angeles, USA (8 Feb 2020 – 2 January 2021)
2020	"Latin America from 1950 to 2020: A Personal Journey". Stephen Friedman Gallery (OVR), London (1–19 Apr)
2020	"Champions", Pace Gallery East Hampton, New York, USA (22 Jul – 2 Aug)
2021	"Acervo em Transformação – MASP". MASP – São Paulo Museum of Art, São Paulo. (1 Jun 2021 to 31 December 2023)
2021	"XIX, XX e XXI", Casa de Cultura de Petrópolis, Rio de Janeiro (12 Feb – 31 May)
2021	"Parque", EAV Parque Lage, Rio de Janeiro (26 Feb - )
2021	"Female Voices of Latin America", online www.vortic.art (8 Mar – 2 May)
2021	"50 Duetos", Unifor Cultural Space – University of Fortaleza, Fortaleza (23 Mar – 23 Dec)
2021	"The Women’s Century: Female Perspectives in Brazilian Art". Cecília Brunson Project, London (4 Jun to 15 Jul)
2021	"Brasilidade pós-Modernismo", CCBB-RJ, Rio de Janeiro (1 Sep – 22 Nov); CCBB-SP, São Paulo (15 Dec – 7 Mar 22); CCBB-DF, Brasília (22 Mar 22 – 5 Jun 22); CCBB-BH, Belo Horizonte (28 Jul 22 – 12 Sep 22)
2021	"Present tense: new prints 2000–2005", IPCNY’s 20th Anniversary, IPCNY – International Print Center New York, New York (30 Sep – 18 Dec)
2021	"Obras Primas do MAB", Brasília Art Museum, DF, (27 Aug - )
2021	"A materialização do invisível", MAC - Museu de Arte Contemporânea, Niterói (8 – 31 September)
2021	"Da Letra À Palavra", Jewish Museum of São Paulo, São Paulo (2 Dec 2021 – 10 April 2022)
2021	"Simbiose: A Ilha que Resiste", Japan House São Paulo, São Paulo (20 November 2021 – 6 February 2022). Symbiosis: Living Island, Itinerary to Los Angeles and London
2022	"Abundant Futures", TBA21 - Thyssen-Bornemisza Art Contemporary, Cordoba, Spain
2022	"Composição Carioca", Convento do Carmo - Cultural Center of the Attorney General's Office of the State of Rio de Janeiro, Rio de Janeiro, (26 May – 13 Aug)
2022	"Prelude: An Introduction to the permanent collection", Tampa Museum of Art, USA (28 September - )
2022	"Alegria aqui é Mato" – 10 Views on the Roberto Marinho Collection, Casa Roberto Marinho, Rio de Janeiro (11 December 2022 - 19 March 2023)
2022	"Centelhas em movimento" - Instituto Tomie Ohtake visits the Igor Queiroz Barroso Collection, Instituto Tomie Ohtake, São Paulo (15 Dec 2022 - 9 April 2023)
2023	"Brasil Futuro: as Formas da Democracia" – National Museum of the Republic (MuN), Brasília (2 Jan to 26 Feb)
2023	"Mulherio", Danielian Gallery, Rio de Janeiro (Jan)
2023	"Leonilson e a Geração 80", Galeria Multiarte, Fortaleza (25 Apr – 3 Jun), Pinakotheke Cultural, Rio de Janeiro (31 Jul – 23 Sep)
2023	"Biennale Architettura 2023", Venice (20 May – 26 Nov)
2023	"Áquila, em torno dos 80", Cidade das Artes, Rio de Janeiro (26 Aug – 8 Oct)
2023	"En el Jardim", MARCO - Museum of Contemporary Art of Monterrey, Monterrey, Mexico (17 Oct - ??)
2023	"Rosas brasileiras", Farol Santander, São Paulo (9 Nov - ??)

== Bibliography ==
- Nichols, Matthew Guy (March 2005). "Beatriz Milhazes at James Cohan" (PDF). Art in America. Brant Publications. Archived from the original (PDF) on 7 October 2008.
- Pedrosa, Adriano (Autumn 2004). "In the Studio: Adriano Pedrosa visits Beatriz Milhazes". Tate Etc (2). Tate. Archived from the original on 28 April 2009.
- Smith, Roberta (6 November 2008). "Art in Review - Beatriz Milhazes". The New York Times.
- Frédéric Paul, Beatriz Milhazes, Meu Bem, Rio de Janeiro: Base7 Projetos Culturais, 2013. ISBN 978-85-62094-12-5
