= Charles Gaines (artist) =

American conceptual artist (born 1944)

- Born: 1944 (age 81–82); Charleston, South Carolina, United States
- Education: Jersey City State College, Rochester Institute of Technology
- Occupation: Visual artist
- Known for: Photography, drawings, installation art, video art
- Movement: Conceptual art
- Children: Malik Gaines

Charles Gaines (born 1944) is an American visual artist, whose work interrogates the discourse of aesthetics, politics, and philosophy. Taking the form of drawings, photographic series and video installations, the work consistently involves the use of systems, predominantly in the form of the grid, often in combination with photography. His work is rooted in conceptual art – in dialogue with artists such as Sol LeWitt, Lawrence Weiner and Mel Bochner – and Gaines is committed to its tenets of engaging cognition and language. As one of the only African-American conceptual artists working in the 1970s, a time when political expressionism was a prevailing concern among African-American artists, Gaines was an outlier in his pursuit of abstraction and non-didactic approach to race and politics. There is a strong musical thread running through much of Gaines' work, evident in his repeated use of musical scores as well in his engagement with the idea of indeterminacy, as similar to John Cage and Sol LeWitt. He lives in Los Angeles, California.

== Early life and education ==
Gaines was born in Charleston, South Carolina. Raised in Newark, New Jersey, he attended Newark Arts High School and received a BA from Jersey City State College in 1966. He earned his MFA in 1967 as the first African American to be accepted into the MFA program at the School of Art and Design at the Rochester Institute of Technology.

== Teaching career ==
In 1967, he was hired to teach art history and painting at Mississippi Valley State University (then Mississippi Valley State College) in Itta Bena. From 1968 to 1990 he was a professor of art at California State University, Fresno. He was a faculty member at the California Institute of the Arts from 1989 until his retirement in 2022, influencing many young artists who studied with him, among them Edgar Arceneaux, Sadie Barnette, Andrea Bowers, Mark Bradford, Sam Durant, Rodney McMillian, and Laura Owens. In 2023, in an effort to address the lack of diversity in art institutions, he established the Charles Gaines Fellowship to provide scholarship support to Black students in the MFA program at CalArts, who are historically underrepresented in the school's MFA program. In 2008 Gaines taught at the Skowhegan School of Painting and Sculpture.

== Art career ==
While living in New York City in 1974, Gaines was encouraged by printmaker Robert (Bob) Blackburn to meet the teacher and printmaker Benjamin Leroy Wigfall. In 1973, Wigfall had launched a community printshop called Communications Village in Kingston, NY, and invited Gaines to be a visiting artist. There, with the help of printer assistants who studied with Wigfall, he translated his earliest systems-based abstractions, such as Circles and X's, into intaglio prints.

In Motion: Trisha Brown Dance (1981), Gaines photographed postmodern dancer Trisha Brown performing the piece Son of Gone Fishin'. Numbering the spaces in a grid that correspond with the body in motion, and overlaying another grid drawing for each image in the series, Gaines seeks to transcribe the moving body in a way that the photograph cannot. In doing so, he also creates an erasure of the body's distinguishing contours – aligning with Trisha Brown's embrace of structures that obscure themselves. With the series Walnut Tree Orchard, Charles Gaines started working with photographs in his artworks in addition to mathematical formulas, continuing the use of grid paper.

- Explosions
- History of Stars
- NIGHT/CRIMES
- Shadows
- Walnut Tree Orchard (1975-2014)
- String Theory
- Manifestos
- Sound Text (2015)

In addition to working on his art, Gaines has been serving on the advisory board of the Hauser & Wirth Institute since 2018.

== Curatorial projects ==
Gaines developed numerous curatorial projects as part of his artistic research. Two early exhibitions focused on black artists engaged in abstraction. In 1974, he curated the exhibition "Black Artists, Recent Attitudes" at the art gallery art Fresno State University, which featured primarily abstract works by Romare Bearden, Norman Lewis, Ernest Crichlow, Martin Puryear and Raymond Saunders - artists who became a major source of encouragement for Gaines. He staged "Black Artists, Recent Attitudes II" at Fresno State University in 1982, which included Robert Blackburn, Melvin Edwards, Elizabeth Catlett, Edward "Ed" Clark, Martin Puryear, William Hutson, and William T. Williams.

== Exhibitions ==
After his first New York City exhibition at Cinque Gallery in 1972, Gaines was included in the 1975 Whitney Biennial at the Whitney Museum of American Art in New York City. His work was included in the traveling group exhibition Numerals: 1924-1977, organized by Leo Castelli Gallery and the Yale University Art Gallery, in 1978. In the 1980s, he was represented by and had solo exhibitions at Leo Castelli Gallery and John Weber Gallery in New York. He has shown at Margo Leavin Gallery in Los Angeles, Young Hoffman in Chicago, Richard Heller Gallery in San Francisco, and Galerie Lavignes-Bastille in Paris, among others. In 2006 Gaines began to exhibit with Susanne Vielmetter Los Angeles Projects, and in 2014 with Paula Cooper Gallery, New York.

Gaines was included in 56th Venice Biennale, curated by Okwui Enwezor in 2015. His work has been included in other major group exhibitions, including the 2007 Venice Biennale, "Blues for Smoke" (Museum of Contemporary Art, Los Angeles, 2012) and Now Dig This! Art and Black Los Angeles 1960 – 1980, curated by Kellie Jones at the Hammer Museum and Under the Big Black Sun: 1974–1981, at the Museum of Contemporary Art, Los Angeles which was curated by Paul Schimmel as part of the 2011 Getty's Pacific Standard Time initiative, Gaines was featured in two prominent Los Angeles exhibitions:

In 2012 the Pomona College Museum of Art and the Pitzer Art Gallery in Claremont, CA, exhibited In The Shadow of Numbers, Charles Gaines Selected Works from 1975 to 2012 which involved a collaborative musical performance with Terry Adkins. Charles Gaines: Gridwork 1974–1999, the artist's first survey exhibition, was organized by The Studio Museum in Harlem in July 2014.

In 2019 the SculptureCenter, Queens, New York, exhibited Searching the Sky for Rain from September 16, 2019 – December 16, 2019 which is a collaboration of many artist such as Carmen Argote, Tony Cokes, Rafael Domenech, Mandy El-Sayegh, ektor garcia, Jacqueline Kiyomi Gordon, Tishan Hsu, Rindon Johnson, Becket MWN, Shahryar Nashat, Michael Queenland, Johanna Unzueta, Jala Wahid, Eric Wesley, Riet Wijnen and Charles Gaines included. The Searching the Sky for Rain exhibit has only two of his works within them. The one placed in the ground floor was the “Numbers and Trees: Central Park Series II: Tree #7" (made in 2016) Laurel and the second placed in the lower level being "Face 1: Identity Politics, #10, Edward Said" (made in 2018).

From November 16, 2023 to March 17, 2024, the Institute of Contemporary Art in Miami organized a survey of his work from 1992-2003, including the recreation of some of his major pieces for the context of the exhibition.

Gaines's work was included in the 2025 exhibition Photography and the Black Arts Movement, 1955–1985 at the National Gallery of Art.

From August 16, 2025 to February 1, 2026, the Art Institute of Chicago exhibited Night/Crimes, a series he created from 1994-1997.

== Awards ==
Gaines received a National Endowment for the Arts (NEA) Grant in 1977. He received a California Community Foundation (CCF) in 2011, and a Guggenheim Fellowship in 2013. Gaines received the CalArts REDCAT Award in 2018 and was awarded the 60th annual Edward MacDowell Medal in 2019. In 2020, he was inducted into the National Academy of Arts and Letters. In 2023, he received an Honorary Doctorate of Fine Arts from his alma mater, Rochester Institute of Technology.

== Writing ==
Gaines has written a number of academic texts including: Theater of Refusal: Black Art and Mainstream Criticism (UC Irvine, 1993); Art, Post History and the Paradox of Black Pluralism, Merge, 12 (2004); "Reconsidering Metaphor/Metonymy: Art and the Suppression of Thought", Art Lies, Issue 64 (Winter/2009); "Ben Patterson: The History of Gray Matter From the Avant-garde to the Postmodern", a catalog essay for an exhibition at the Contemporary Arts Museum Houston (November 2010); and Kerry James Marshall, London: Phaidon Press, 2017.

== Solo exhibitions ==
- 2022, Gridwork: Palm Canyon Watercolors Galerie Max Hetzler, Paris
- 2021, New Work: Charles Gaines San Francisco Museum of Modern Art, San Francisco
- 2021, Dia Beacon, Beacon
- 2021, Multiples of Nature, Trees and Faces Hauser & Wirth, London
- 2021, Drawings, Hauser & Wirth, St. Moritz
- 2019, Palm Trees and Other Works, Hauser & Wirth, Los Angeles
- 2018, Galerie Max Hetzler, Berlin
- 2018, Faces 1: Identity Politics, Paula Cooper Gallery, New York

== Group exhibitions ==
2022

- Forest Through the Trees, Laumeier Sculpture Park, St. Louis
- Lifes, Hammer Museum, Los Angeles (catalogue)

2021

- Grief and Grievance: Art and Mourning in America, New Museum, New York (catalogue)
- Kathmandu Triennial, Kathmandu
- Blood, Sweat, and Tears, UMLAUF Sculpture Garden and Museum, Austin
- Lives that Bind: a restorative justice installation, Santa Monica City Hall East, Santa Monica

2020

- Lives that Bind: a restorative justice installation City Services Building Art Bank, Santa Monica
- Drawing 2020 Gladstone Gallery, New York
- To Form a More Perfect Union Hauser & Wirth, New York
- Artists for New York Hauser & Wirth, New York
- Garden of Six Seasons Para Site, Hong Kong

2019

- Words, Alexander Berggruen, New York
- Generations: A History of Black Abstract Art, The Baltimore Museum of Art, Baltimore
- Searching the Sky for Rain, SculptureCenter, New York
- Process and Pattern, Wisch Family Gallery, Anderson Collection at Stanford University, Stanford
- Trees, Fondation Cartier pour l´art contemporain, Paris
- The World to Come: Art in the Age of the Anthropocene, University of Michigan Museum of Art, Ann Arbor
- About Things Loved: Blackness and Belonging, Berkeley Art Museum and Pacific Film Archive, Berkeley
- California Artists in the Marciano Collection, Marciano Art Foundation, Los Angeles
- Mapping Black Identities, Minneapolis Institute of Art, Minneapolis
- Solidary & Solitary: The Joyner / Giuffrida Collection, Smart Museum of Art, Chicago

== Public collections ==
- Art Institute of Chicago, Chicago
- Blanton Museum of Art, The University of Texas at Austin, Austin, Texas
- Baltimore Museum of Art, Baltimore
- Hammer Museum, Los Angeles, California
- Hirshhorn Museum and Sculpture Garden, Washington DC
- Lentos Museum, Linz
- Marciano Collection, Los Angeles
- Museum of Contemporary Art, Chicago
- Minneapolis Institute of Art, Minneapolis, MN ("Explosion #25", 2008)

== Art market ==
Gaines is represented by Hauser & Wirth (since 2018) and Galerie Max Hetzler. He previously worked with Paula Cooper Gallery and Vielmetter Los Angeles.
