= Ida Ekblad =

Norwegian artist

Ida Ekblad (born 1980) is a Norwegian artist who works across painting, sculpture, installation and poetry.

Her work is inspired by a multitude of sources and one can recognize sub-cultural and pop-cultural influences. Art historically, Ekblad's oeuvre is often linked to the ideas and gestures of movements such as CoBrA, Situationism, and Abstract Expressionism and is influenced by a variety of artists such as Odilon Redon, Paula Modersohn Becker, Marie Laurencin, Paul Thek, Harriet Backer, Florine Stettheimer, and Helen Frankenthaler. Her style is signified by a genre-crossing approach and incorporates, for example, the aesthetics of graffiti, manga culture, arts and crafts, old master paintings, deviant art, and meme culture. Ekblad's practice is focused on our hyper-retinal culture which she tries to visually record and comprehend. “Whatever sense I find,” she says, “is primarily an aesthetic sense. In painting, sculpture, and via material twists and turns, I am striving to make a personal and decent pattern of what happens to come my way.” (Ida Ekblad, Artist Statement, “A mansion for all lovely forms,” 2018)

== Background ==
Ekblad was born in Oslo, Norway, in 1980. She studied at Central Saint Martins College of Art and Design in London before earning both her BA and MA in Fine Art from The National Academy of Art, Oslo, graduating in 2007. In 2016, she founded the exhibition space and record label SCHLOSS in a former Porsche car repair workshop in Oslo.

== Exhibitions ==
Ekblad's work has been exhibited in many institutions such as the Venice Biennale, the National Museum of Art, Architecture and Design, Oslo, Kunsthaus Hamburg, Palais de Tokyo, Paris and the BALTIC Centre for Contemporary Art in Gateshead, UK. In 2019, Ekblad had major museum shows at Museo Rufino Tamayo, Mexico City and Kunsthalle Zürich.

=== Solo exhibitions ===
- 2010: Digging. Treasure. Bonniers Konsthall, Stockholm, Sweden
- 2010: Poem Percussion, Bergen Kunsthall, Bergen, Norway
- 2013: The Root cellar, De Vleeshal, Middelburg, Netherlands
- 2013: Ida Ekblad, National Museum of Norway - Museum of Contemporary Art, Oslo, Norway
- 2015: Ida Ekblad, BALTIC Centre for Contemporary Art, Gateshead, United Kingdom
- 2017: Ida Ekblad – Diary of a Madam, Kunsthaus Hamburg, Hamburg, Germany
- 2018: Leda Bourgogne | Ida Ekblad, Kunstverein Braunschweig, Braunschweig, Germany
- 2019: BLOOD OPTICS, Museo Tamayo, Mexico City, Mexico
- 2019: FRA ÅRE TIL OVN, Kunsthalle Zürich, Zurich, Switzerland

=== Group exhibitions ===
- 2011: ILLUMInazioni, 54th Venice Biennale, Venice, Italy
- 2013: Revolution, Kunstmuseum Luzern, Luzern, Switzerland
- 2015: Raw and Delirious, Kunsthalle Bern, Bern, Switzerland
- 2015: The World is Made of Stories, Astrup Fearnley Museum, Oslo, Norway
- 2017: University of Disaster, Venice Biennale, National Pavilion Bosnia & Herzegovina, Palazzo Malipiero, Venice, Italy
- 2018: Faithless Pictures, National Museum, Oslo, Norway

== Collections ==
Her artwork is part of numerous public collections, among them are the Migros Museum für Gegenwartskunst, the Louisiana Museum of Modern Art, Moderna Museet, the Astrup Fearnley Museum, the Preus Museum and the Hessel Museum of Art.

== Publications ==
- Ida Ekblad: The Root Cellar, SBKM/Vleeshal & MER Paper Kunsthalle, 2014, ISBN 9789491775390
- Ida Ekblad: Poem Percussion, Bergen Kunsthall, ISBN 9788299732697
