= Chicago Metro News =

Newspaper in Illinois

- Type: Weekly newspaper
- Publisher: Charles B. Armstrong, Sr.; Ruth Armstrong
- Editor: Nathaniel Clay; Ruth Armstrong
- Founded: 1965
- Ceased publication: 1991
- Political alignment: Republican Party
- Language: English
- Headquarters: 2600 S. Michigan Avenue, Chicago
- Circulation: 79,000 (as of 1985)
- ISSN: 2638-9134
- OCLC number: 10448791

The Chicago Metro News was a weekly African American newspaper serving the Chicago metropolitan area. Published in Harvey, it was known initially as the South Suburban News, then from 1968 to 1972 as the Chicago-South Suburban News, and thereafter as the Chicago Metro News. In the 1980s the paper claimed an audited circulation of 79,000. It billed itself as the "Largest Black Oriented Weekly Circulated in Chicago Area."

The founder and original publisher of the Metro News was Charles B. Armstrong, Sr., a political activist, educator, and former advertising manager for the Chicago affiliate of the Pittsburgh Courier. Armstrong published the first issue of twelve pages In Harvey on November 13, 1965. In November 1972 he moved the paper from Harvey to the Prairie Place Professional Building at 2600 S. Michigan, and changed the name from Chicago South Suburban News to Chicago Metro News.

Armstrong was aligned with the Republican Party, and served as a regional director of Nixon's Committee to Re-Elect the President in 1972. He supported Cecil Partee for attorney general in 1976 and was a strong backer of Harold Washington's mayoral campaign. He clashed with Jesse Jackson, criticizing his boycott of Anheuser Busch and accusing him of attempting to shake down Black organizations. However, Armstrong declined to endorse Ronald Reagan for a second term in 1984 and endorsed Jackson's presidential campaign instead.

In March 1985, Armstrong was fatally shot at the newspaper office by a former boyfriend of Armstrong's daughter.

The Chicago Metro News shut down in May 1991, having not produced an issue since December 1990.
