= Jesse Jackson (state legislator) =

20th century American politician

Member of the Illinois House of Representatives
- In office 1981–1983

Personal details
- Born: Memphis, Tennessee, U.S.
- Party: Republican
- Occupation: Politician

Jesse Jackson Sr. is an American former politician. He served in the Illinois House of Representatives from 1981 to 1983. He was a Republican.

Born in Memphis, Tennessee, Jackson moved with his family to Chicago where he graduated from DuSable High School in 1942. Before becoming state legislator, he was a grocer and auto parts salesman. After his business career, he worked for the Illinois Department of Transportation. As a state representative, he supported legislation for vaccine injury awards and small business development.
