= Marepe (artist) =

Brazilian contemporary artist (born 1970)

- Born: 1970 (age 55–56); Santo Antonio de Jesus, Brazil
- Education: Woodbury University, Art Center College of Design
- Known for: sculpture, drawing, installation art
- Notable work: Rio fundo / Deep River (2004), Agua viva / Jellyfish (2005), Veja Meu Bem / Look my dear (2007)
- Movement: Contemporary art

Marepe (born Marcos Reis Peixoto; 1970) is a Brazilian contemporary artist best known for his minimalist wood and metal sculptures and drawings. His artwork alludes his origins: culture and tradition of his birthplace, the concept of shortage, colonization and globalization are the artist's main approaches. Marepe lives and works in Santo Antonio de Jesus, Brazil.

== Education ==
In 1989, when Marepe had his first notable success by winning the first prize at the Recôncavo Biennale (Brazil) he refused an offer to study at the University of Fine Arts of Hamburg continuing his visual arts studies at the Federal University of Bahia. (Note: Year of graduation is unknown.)

== Work ==
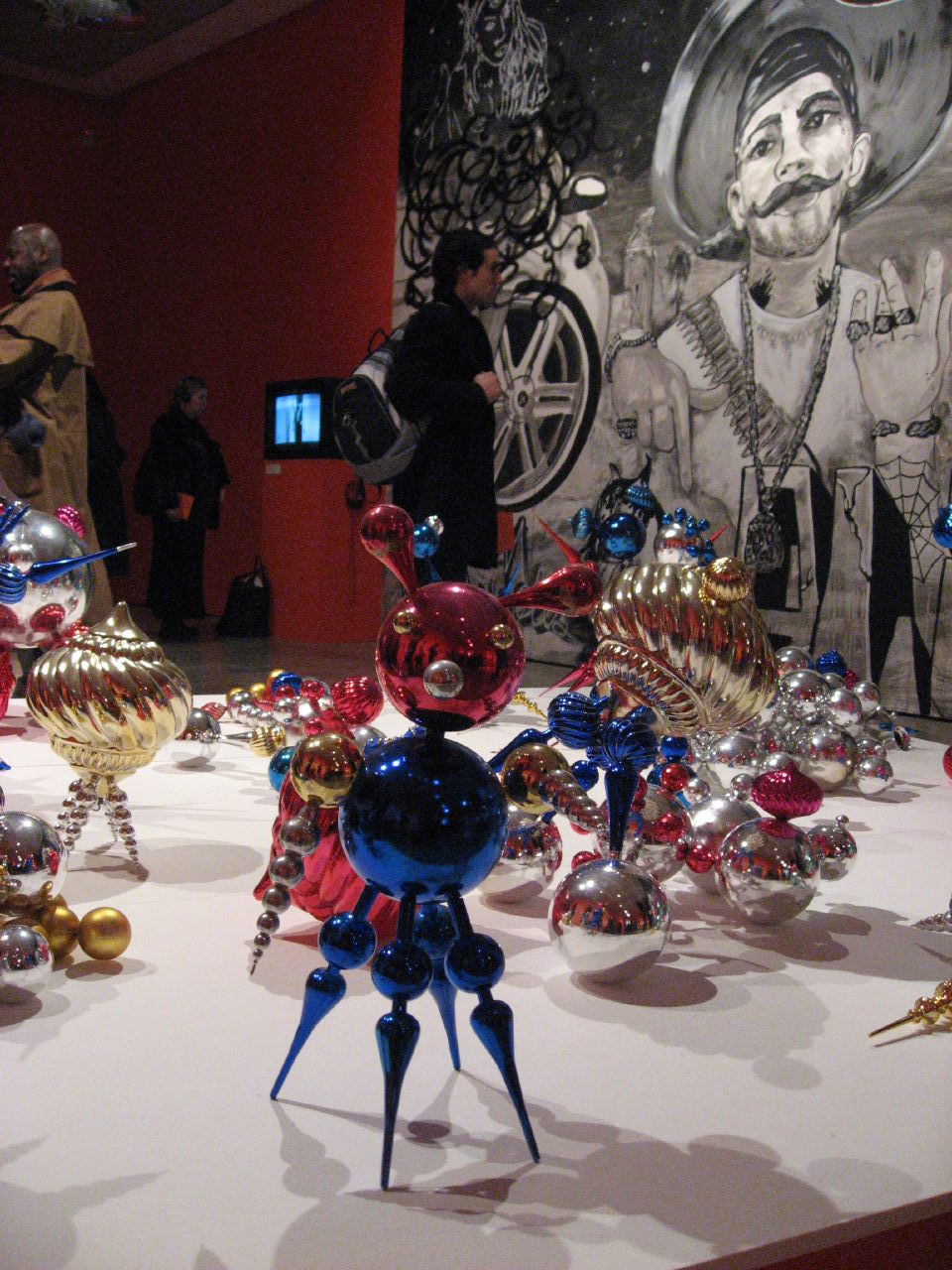
Marepe's Untitled (2002–04) during the 'Alien Nation' exhibition held in 2006 at the Institute of Contemporary Arts, London

Marepe's artwork expresses his personal perception upon his life juxtaposed with the political and socio-cultural spirit of Brazil, represented using everyday objects, local materials and events from his home based surroundings.

In 2013, during an exposition at the Inhotim Institute (Brazil) where Marepe exposed a metal sculpture, A Cabra / The Goat, his curator claimed to The New York Times that "Marepe is connected to the popular culture of Brazil, and how people represent the more rustic elements of their lives".

In Veja Meu Bem (2007), made to last just two days at Tate Modern's Turbine Hall, Marepe reconstructed the atmosphere of a Brazilian funfair, installing a festival carousel and adding to it a chute of sugar-coated fruits, accessible to the viewers. The artwork was inspired by what he called "beautiful and precarious Brazil" and it was a way to bring a piece of his native country to London — a shift comparable to a prior installation art project, where the artist took a painted exterior wall from Santo Antonio de Jesus to the São Paulo Art Biennial.

Marepe's opinion about globalization of the art world:

The fast pace of the contemporary world and the new demands posed by a globalized art circuit has often led artists not only to establish ephemeral relationships while carrying out their art production, but also to adapt their work to other contexts.

Transporting ordinary objects into the world of art, the artist honours the Duchampian wave of the prêt-à-porter, but he also induces it, creating new meanings. The fact that Marepe lives in his native town influences his art; the everyday life in Brazil is Marape's source for creation: stalls, low-income ménages, metallic basins or trees trunk – are mixed in his artwork. Marepe includes these items in different universes resulting an "alterity" within the artistic world, alluding subjects as colonialism, identity issues, various differences between social classes and the antithesis between the modern and the traditional lifestyles.

Marepe renders objects which may seem useless but which are a necessity in some of the under developed areas of Brazil. In contrast with this, he calls his works "necessities". One of Marepe's artworks, Peixe Com Auréola (2012), consisted in a bicycle designed in such way it couldn't be ridden, having a wheel emerging from the seat. He also replaced the two classical wheels with a fish head in the front and a fish tail, both made of wood, in the back. (Note: The fish, in the Christian tradition, is a symbol of nourishment and abundance.) Through this artwork, according to the former American news website, Examiner.com, Marepe tried to express "the dire need in his community for the type of abundance necessary to pursue greater meaning in life".
