= Slater Bradley =

American artist

- Born: 1975 (age 50–51); San Francisco, California, U.S.
- Education: University of California, Los Angeles
- Occupation: Visual artist

Slater Bradley (born 1975) is an American conceptual and cross-disciplinary artist, typically working in thematic series and installations. In his video works, Bradley often combines footage of real events, soundtracks drawn from classical and contemporary music as well as references to literary, scientific, or historical works. In his most recent work, Bradley manipulates photographic material by using markers and eliminating backgrounds as well as removing known icons from their time and place.

Bradley was dubbed the "unintended king of serendipity" by curator Heidi Zuckerman as well as “something of a cult hero” by Anne Stringfield of The New Yorker. He has exhibited collaborative work with Ed Lachman at the Aspen Art Museum and the Whitney Museum of American Art. In 2005, at the age of 30, Bradley became the youngest artist to have a solo show at The Solomon R. Guggenheim Museum in New York.

He currently lives and works in Berlin, Germany.

== Early life and education ==
Slater Bradley was born and raised in San Francisco, California. He graduated from San Francisco University High School in 1993 and earned a B.A. from the University of California, Los Angeles in 1998, where he received the Lillian Levenson Scholarship.

== Early career ==
Bradley launched his career with his first solo show titled The Fried Liver Attack, named after the chess gambit which sacrifices the knight, at Team Gallery in 2000.

He gained notoriety at 25 with his second solo show Charlatan, also at Team Gallery, which displayed his "real flair for capturing emotional moments". The show featured the video work The Laurel Tree (Beach) (2000) with actress Chloë Sevigny standing on a cloudy beach reciting Thomas Mann's Tonio Kröger (1903). Sevigny's “uninflected manner” is particularly pared down as the speech she delivers happens to be incredibly loaded, as described in a review by Frieze Magazine:

For, after all, what more pitiable sight is there than life led astray by art? We artists have a consummate contempt for the dilettante, the man who is leading a living life and yet thinks he can be an artist too if he gets half the chance.

The show also featured the works Female Gargoyle. and JFK Jr. The first being an “amateur video” of a tattooed woman balancing dangerously on the corner of a roof. Here, “a female gargoyle come to life, who, it seems, is engulfed by a life-and-death decision”, but the work never reveals the fate of the gargoyle. In JFK Jr., Slater Bradley reflects on “the culture of loss and remembrance”. The video follows a young girl placing a flower at a memorial outside of the deceased’s apartment, and “the camera’s myopic gaze seems to comment on the mythological, almost narcissistic grief we are willing to shed for those we never knew”.

By 2004, Slater Bradley was considered a "rising younger artist", having held a solo exhibition in 2003 at the Center for Curatorial Studies Museum at Bard College and being included in the 2004 Whitney Biennial with the video Theory and Observation which critic Jerry Saltz described as one of "the most ravishing works in the show". The video contemplates the relationship between reason and faith and features close-ups of a youth choir in the cathedral of Notre-Dame. The work “stunningly capture states of gawkiness and anxiety in kids whose singing channels divinity” as described by the art critic Peter Schjeldahl in The New Yorker

In 2005, Bradley was awarded by the NASA Art Program, and produced the video work Dark Night of the Soul (2005-2006) in collaboration with the American Museum of Natural History. The work portrays an astronaut walking through the galleries of the American Museum of Natural History in New York to the re-recording of Beethoven’s “Moonlight Sonata”, performed on a flute. The lone character explores representations of Earth and outer space as if visiting a strange new world. “Alluding to images of science and history, as well as an already past future referenced in Kubrick’s 2001: A Space Odyssey, Bradley’s film evokes unspoken connections between imagination and fact.”

== The Doppelganger ==
It was at the Charlatan show, Slater Bradley introduced the concept of “The Doppelganger” – as in ‘one who goes twice’ – with his photographic work My Doppelganger as Ian Curtis in a Charlatan Pose (Cigarette) as the postcard for the show. Here, Bradley began passing off photographs of his double, portrayed by model Benjamin Brock (who bears an uncanny resemblance to Bradley himself), as though they were images of himself. In a review of Charlatan, critic Roberta Smith offers the statement "It is a declaration of artistic intent that makes one eager to see what Mr. Bradley will do next."

Later, in 2001, during the show Trompe le Monde at Galerie Yvon Lambert in Paris, Bradley reintroduced the concept in a video installation featuring “Slater” waking up in his apartment and walking out into New York City. The seminal concept of The Doppelganger continued to be woven into Bradley's work in the following years.

In 2002, during the show Here are the Young Men at Team Gallery, Bradley presented the work Factory Archives (2002), which would later become the first of three videos in the acclaimed Doppelganger Trilogy (also including Phantom Release (2003) and Recorded Yesterday (2004)). The trilogy revolves around the subject of "recycled illusions that are the reality of pop culture" and conjures up three pop icons, Ian Curtis, Kurt Cobain and Michael Jackson, described by Nancy Spector, curator of Contemporary Art at the Guggenheim, as “fallen heroes”. Spector continues: “two by suicide and one by a protracted descent into disrepute—these figures are perceived through the distancing lens of desire and memory.” Slater Bradley explicitly situates his work in the context of the fandom surrounding these three fallen heroes, which he summons from the dead.

Bradley describes Ian Curtis – the subject/ object of Factory Archives (2002) – as a “cult hero” and explains how: “[the Nirvana video] Phantom Release links itself directly to the fans,” bringing together “images and performances culled and homogenized from my memories of MTV, concert documentaries, magazine covers, Saturday Night Live, and three concerts I had seen in San Francisco”; and says, of Michael Jackson, who is represented in Recorded Yesterday (2004): “He was my first introduction into the realm of the rock star and with it, the worship factor."

Each chapter of the trilogy appears both worn and overexposed, as if distorted by age, or, as described by Paul Fleming in his essay from the Lifetime Achievement Award, “As if secretly documenting a sliver of time, the images have a home video quality: wobbly, slightly out-of-focus (…) like a memory slipping away.” The three video works featured recordings of a faux concert performances, such as in Factory Archives (2002), where Curtis, lead singer of the punk band Joy Division, is depicted as an elusive performer just before the dawn of MTV.

In 2004, Bradley showed at the Museum of Modern Art's Premieres and exhibited the Doppelganger Trilogy at the Los Angeles gallery Blum & Poe. In 2005, the trilogy was shown by the Guggenheim under the title Recent Acquisitions: Slater Bradley's Doppelganger Trilogy. The same year, the work The Year of the Doppelganger was shown at the Berkeley Art Museum, organized by BAM/PFA and curated by Heidi Zuckerman. The video installations blend the widely recognizable drumbeat from Led Zeppelin “When The Levee Braks”, performed by Bradley’s doppelganger, with a surprise appearance by the Cal football team, entering the stadium to practice.

Zuckerman writes: "By replacing himself with another, Bradley highlights the fallacy of individuality and underscores his own mortality. Like many artists of his generation (he is thirty), Bradley exhibits a fascination with death in much of his work. ... With an uncanny ability to channel moments loaded with cultural relevance, equipped only with a video camera, Slater Bradley becomes a clairvoyant for collective consciousness.”

‘The Year of the Doppelganger’ was also shown at Barbara Gladstone Gallery as part of the group show "Bridge Freezes Before Road" (June 24 – August 6, 2005), which was featured in the art review "Fanciful to Figurative to Wryly Inscrutable," by Holland Cotter, as well as on the front page of the New York Times' arts section. The work was acquired by MoMA and is part of the museum’s collection.

The theme of pop culture was continually referenced throughout Bradley's work until The Doppelganger's symbolic death in the 3-channel film Dead Ringer (2011), a groundbreaking collaboration between Bradley and noted cinematographer Ed Lachman.

== Collaboration with Ed Lachman ==
In 2010, Bradley held an exhibition at the Whitney Museum in collaboration with Academy Award nominated cinematographer Edward Lachman, whose best known films include Far from Heaven, Erin Brockovich, and The Virgin Suicides. Lachman was director of photography for the 1993 film Dark Blood, starring River Phoenix, and which was still in production at the time of the actor’s sudden death.

“Bradley, whose photographs and films explore celebrity and the fractured nature of identity, worked with Lachman to create two video installations and a series of photographs referencing Dark Blood, derived from Lachman’s memories of filming the original work and combined with Bradley’s complex identification with the late actor as both subject and symbol.” The video installation Shadow featured the Doppelganger as River Phoenix and served as a prologue to the unfinished Hollywood film.

In Dark Blood, River Phoenix plays a young, half–Navajo widower who lives like a hermit near a nuclear testing site in the Nevada desert, waiting for the apocalypse. A married couple strands when their car breaks down in the desert, but are rescued by the widower, who falls in love with the woman. The film progresses to a dramatic ending. However, the final scenes were never filmed. Filmed seventeen years later in the same location, Shadow features the imagined past of the main character, combining images from the original film with new footage. Artists have long engaged with the mythology of Hollywood, “creating a hybrid of art and cinema that has become an important strand of contemporary art”.

Based on Ed Lachman’s memories and recollections of filming Dark Blood, Slater Bradley imagines the widower’s life before meeting the couple. The two narratives are woven together by threads of fact and fiction whose boundaries are never made clear” as put by the curators of the exhibition at the Whitney Museum. In a further twist, Ben Brock, who plays Phoenix as the widower and previously portrayed “The Doppelganger”, makes the installation a triple portrait of the actor, the cinematographer, and the artist, blurring the lines between illusion and reality, past and future.

== After the Doppelganger ==
A theme of the "lost woman," an idea sourced chiefly from Chris Marker's film La Jetée, became central to Bradley’s work after the completion of Shadow. Following Marker's death on July 29, 2012, Bradley began work on what would become his homage to the 1962 sci-fi masterpiece. His video, entitled she was my la jetée premiered on Nowness.com on April 5, 2013 and was shown soon after in an eponymous exhibition at Galería Helga de Alvear in Madrid, Spain as well as part of Sequoia: Recent Work by Slater Bradley at Cornell University's Johnson Museum of Art.

The elusive female subject continued to haunt Bradley over the course of a solo show with Sean Kelly gallery during which the artist completed his work in a small bunker of the gallery’s basement. The exhibition A Point Beyond the Tree whose title was taken from a line in Marker’s film, opened on December 14, 2013 alongside Saints and Sinners, a selection of Robert Mapplethorpe’s portraits celebrating the 25th anniversary of his counterculturally groundbreaking exhibition Robert Mapplethorpe: The Perfect Moment.

In a parallel investigation, Bradley was at work on a lifelike copper casting of his high school baseball glove, revisiting the Salingerian themes found in his 2009–2011 video, don't let me disappear. Surprisingly, the copper sculpture, Cancer Rising, was completed just as Shane Salerno's documentary Salinger was released in the U.S., and just prior to the peculiar leak of three unpublished Salinger stories. The first of these, "The Ocean Full of Bowling Balls" brings to life a familiar character from Catcher in the Rye, a boy in the habit of inscribing verses of poetry, selections from William Blake, John Keats and Robert Browning, across his firstbaseman's glove.

== Disappearing from New York to Berlin ==
In the ultimate disappearing act, Bradley departed New York for Berlin in 2013. Once there, Bradley returned to spiritual themes and questions, previously explored in works such as Theory and Observation, which contemplates the relationship between reason and faith, and Bradley began to re-invent himself through rigorous spiritual introspection. Moving from pop cultural icons and references, towards a more abstract and energy-aware artistic approach, this development in Slater Bradley’s work was – as described by Heidi Zuckerman – driven by the artist’s intuition.

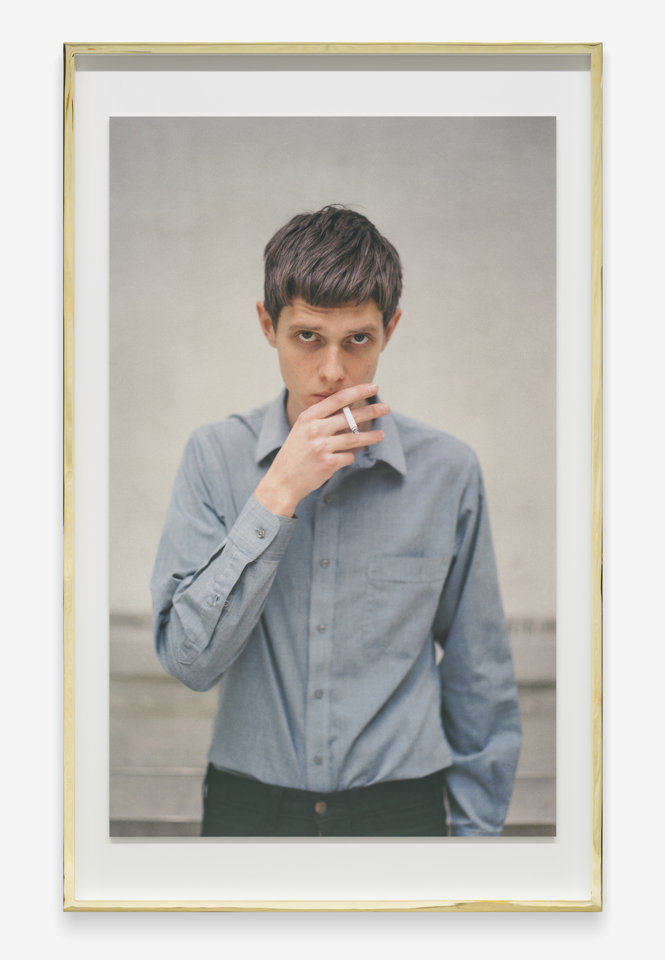
Factory Icon 2000/2017

To share the learnings from his encounters with transcendence, Bradley co-founded a project space with Johannes Fricke Waldhausen in Munich called Goodroom where he exhibited and offered natal chart readings in December 2015. His work was curated into the group exhibition Dreaming Mirrors Dreaming Screens at Sprüth Magers gallery in 2016 with thirteen other artists including Jon Rafman, Andy Hope 1930 and Lizzie Fitch/Ryan Trecartin. The show considered the increasingly complex human relationship with screens, objects that have evolved to function as dual representations of both “the rational and the dreamlike.”

True Faith, an exhibition curated by Matthew Higgs and Jon Savage with the collaboration of archivist Johan Kugelberg in Manchester, England, was part of a 2017 city-wide arts festival commissioned to celebrate the music of Joy Division and explore their continuing cultural impact as a powerful inspiration to visual artists. Bradley’s photograph Factory Icon from 2000, portraying the artist’s doppelganger as Ian Curtis, was re-worked in the proportions of the golden rectangle and featured on the cover of the exhibition catalogue as well as displayed on banners hung throughout the city. Also on view was a video from Bradley's Doppelganger Trilogy from 2001–2004. As noted by Adrian Seattle writing for The Guardian, "in this work, it is not Ian Curtis on stage at all, but a double (Bradley’s other Doppelganger video portraits portray Kurt Cobain and Michael Jackson). The harder you look, the more difficult it is to grasp the image. The singer is only a trace: pinwheeling arms, a jerky back-and-forth shuffle, a looming face that comes and goes, that sonorous baritone voice, a thing more solid and permanent than this fleeting figure."

== Sundoor ==
By shifting the focus towards the spiritual dimensions, rather than channeling pop icons, the inner focus becomes apparent in Bradley’s more recent work, such as the Shields series, where ancient cosmology and astrological themes play a significant role. The Shield series consists of hundreds of thousands of paint-pen strokes that create both subtle graduations and patterns. The experience of the works, as well as the process behind, calls upon hypnotic or even meditative concentration, and reminds the viewer of both organic tissue and radiant halos of cosmic dust.

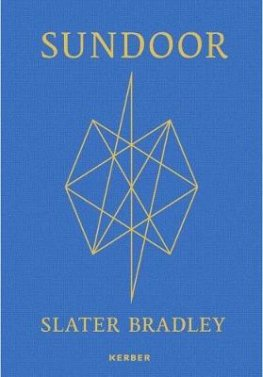
Slater Bradley: Sundoor

In the artists’ most recent installation works, the collective spiritual experience and sacred sites are explored through transcultural cosmology, philosophy, and mythology. His work includes several recurring forms and figures, such as the pentagram as a symbol of Venus and divine femininity, crystal stones and the oculus, the portal to the divine, as well as an ancient color palette of deep blue and gold, which throughout history has been connected to transcendence and the divine across belief systems.

In 2017, Zuecca Projects presented Sundoor at World’s End, featuring Bradley’s sculpture Crystal Labyrinth (La Maddalena) in Venice, Italy in 2017, concurrent with the 57th Biennale. The installation, consisting of 888 rose quartz crystals forming a 7-meter diameter labyrinth and surrounded by solar shields, was installed from May through November at it:Chiesa della Maddalena (Venezia) (Church of Mary Magdalene) and was accompanied by a soundtrack by composer Dustin O’Halloran. It is a mystical work about spiritual ascension, and in the words of John Major Jenkins, the "journey up through the planetary spheres of the ecliptic to the door of the Most High, the Sol Invictus, the Eighth Gate, the realm of the Hypercosmic Sun."

Sundoor at World’s End was nominated for a Global Fine Art Award for Best Public Exhibition.

Slater Bradley: Sundoor a monograph featuring texts by both John Major Jenkins and Rachel Baum was released in December 2018 by Kerber Verlag. The publication considers his international installation work dealing with collective spiritual experience, sacred sites, and personal histories. Bradley describes in an interview with Artsy how he thinks “there’s a neo-spiritual art movement happening.” He says: “At a certain point the truth is a bigger subject than pop culture. With meditation you find your inner peace, your inner truth, your centered truth, and then you find the world, and the world finds its center. That’s a noble pursuit for art these days.” The book launched as part of the exhibition Under the Sunbeams opening at therethere gallery in Los Angeles in February 2019. Bradley exhibited his series of D8S paintings which play off the geometrics of astrological charts from chosen moments in time inspired by birthdates, founding fathers, origin stories pulled from the past and future.

== The Gates of Many Colors ==
Slater Bradley’s recent body of work, The Gates of Many Colors, sees the artist (The Artist) adopting the role of a diviner. But “can The Artist, as an archetype, connect our secular contemporary realities to a more transcendental awareness that incorporates our ancient wisdoms, systems, and even prophecies?” In eight digital photographs transferred onto two-meter-high canvases, the gates of Jerusalem’s Old City Wall are depicted as monumental edifices with visible everyday features like parked cars and graffiti. However, the photographs have also been altered with the gate portal appearing as another color.

The Gates of Many Colors was scheduled to open at Galería Pelaires, but postponed and later shut down due to COVID-19.

== Collections ==
- Whitney Museum of American Art
- Colección Jumex
- Museum of Modern Art
- Solomon R. Guggenheim Foundation
- Frans Hals Museum
- Fundación Helga de Alvear

== Publications ==
- Slater Bradley: Sundoor, Text by Rachel Baum, Slater Bradley, John Major Jenkins, Kerber Verlag, 2018. ISBN 9783735605269
- Look Up and Stay in Touch, Texts by Chrissie Iles, Mark Rappolt, Interview with Ed Lachman and Heidi Zuckerman Jacobson, Aspen Art Press, 2012. ISBN 9780934324533
- Lifetime Achievement Award, Texts by Matthew Mascotte and Paul Fleming, Savannah College of Art And Design, 2007. ISBN 1893974294
- don’t let me disappear, Text by Amada Cruz, Center for Curatorial Studies, Bard College, 2002. ISBN 9781931493192
