= Track 16 Gallery =

Contemporary art gallery in Los Angeles, California

Coordinates: 34.03527°N 118.25612°W

Track 16 is a contemporary art gallery with locations in East Hollywood and in the fashion district neighborhood of downtown Los Angeles.

== History ==
Track 16 was founded in 1994 by Tom Patchett and was located at the gallery hub Bergamot Station which launched that same year. They remained at Bergamot for 17 years until their building was demolished to make way for Metro's Expo Line train station. In 2012 they relocated to the Hayden Tract in Culver City where they focused on performance and theater work. In 2017 Sean Meredith, who had helped founded the gallery in 1994, became partner and director and relocated them to the Bendix Building in downtown Los Angeles. In 2025 they opened a second exhibition space in East Hollywood, debuting with a solo exhibit of Eve Wood's work on paper. In the early years of the gallery, they staged exhibits with the artworks of Man Ray, Manuel Ocampo, the early Punk scene in L.A. ("Forming"), and contemporary Latin American art ("Amnesia", "While Cuba Waits").

== Artists ==
- Estate of Pedro Álvarez Castelló
- Sandow Birk
- Debra Broz
- Nao Bustamante
- Robbie Conal
- David Daigle
- Estate of Simone Gad
- Roberta Gentry
- Don Ed Hardy
- Kathleen Henderson
- Galia Linn
- Mondongo
- Burt Payne 3
- Elyse Pignolet
- Alicia Piller
- Molly Segal
- Laurie Steelink
- Camilla Taylor
- Chris Ulivo
- Eve Wood

== Selected exhibitions ==
- 1994: Burt Payne 3: Access
- 1995: Martin Kippenberger: LA International
- 1995: Jack Pierson: Paradise
- 1995: Chain Reaction, An Abbreviated Survey of Idea-Based Art, Curated By Steven Leiber
- 1996: Decade of Protest: Political Posters from the United States, Viet Nam, and Cuba 1965-1975
- 1996: William S. Burroughs: Concrete and Buckshot
- 1996-1997: Man Ray: Paris~L.A.
- 1997: Manuel Ocampo: Heridas de la Lengua
- 1998-1999: Viggo Mortensen: Recent Forgeries
- 1999: Karen Finley: Pooh Unplugged
- 1999: Forming: The Early Days of L.A. Punk
- 2000: Pedro Alvarez: On the Pan-American Highway
- 2000: Eduardo Abaroa: Soon After Before
- 2000: Ruben Ortiz Torres: Power Tools
- 2000: Surf Trip, Curated by Bob Carrillo and René de Guzman
- 2002: The Godfrey Daniels School of Charm, Curated by Georganne Deen
- 2002: David Byrne: Elective Affinities
- 2003: Le Dernier Cri: Legendary Publishers of the International Underground
- 2003: Table Turners
- 2007: Johanna Went: Ablutions of a Nefarious Nature
- 2008: Don Ed Hardy, When East Meets West
- 2018: Robbie Conal, Cabinet of Horrors
- 2019: Marsian De Lellis, Simone Gad, Debra Broz, Stuck Together
- 2019: Elyse Pignolet, You Should Calm Down
- 2020: Rakeem Cunningham and Clifford Prince King, INSTALLATION #000000
- 2021: Galia Linn, Beauty Queen, Heartbreaker, High Maintenance
- 2021: John Collins, Moonlight Graham
- 2021: I Like LA and LA Likes Me: Joseph Beuys at 100
- 2022: Alicia Piller: Atmospheric Pressures
- 2022: Sandow Birk: Los Angeles and Her Surroundings, and other works
- 2022: Confluence, curated by Debra Scacco
- 2023: Molly Segal: What We Whispered and What We Screamed
- 2024: Mondongo: Calavera 8
- 2024: Nao Bustamante: Bloom
- 2025: Camilla Taylor: Unkindness
- 2025: Joseph Beuys: Potential Goods
- 2026: Roberta Gentry: Blood Orange
