= Saliger =

Saliger is a surname. Notable people with the surname include:

- Alois Benjamin Saliger (1880–1969), American inventor and businessman
- Johannes Saliger, Lutheran theologian
- Stefan Saliger (born 1967), German field hockey player

== See also ==
- Salinger
