= Lafitte (disambiguation) =

Lafitte may refer to:

- Lafitte (surname)
- Lafitte, Louisiana
- Lafitte, Tarn-et-Garonne, a commune in southern France
- Lafitte Greenway, a trail for pedestrians and bicycles in New Orleans, Louisiana
- Lafitte Projects, in the 6th Ward of New Orleans, Louisiana
- Lafitte's Blacksmith Shop in the French Quarter of New Orleans

== See also ==
- Château Lafite Rothschild, a French winemaker
- Jean Lafitte, Louisiana
- Jean Lafitte National Historical Park and Preserve, includes several regions in south Louisiana
- Laffitte (disambiguation)
