= Mondongo (disambiguation) =

Sopa de mondongo is a Latin-American soup made from diced tripe.

Mondongo may also refer to:

- Mondongo (collective), an Argentine art collective
- Congo-Mondongo confraternity, a Catholic confraternity of people of Congolese descent
- Mondongos, swamp fields on the island Marajó in the Brazilian state Pará
