= Selinger =

Selinger (also Sellinger) (Hebrew: זלינגר) is a surname, originally an Ashkenazi Jewish surname of German origin.

Notable people with the surname include:

- Al Sellinger (1914–1986), American cyclist
- Arie Selinger (born 1937), Israeli volleyball coach
- Avital Selinger (born 1959), Israeli volleyball player
- Ben Selinger (born 1939), Australian chemist and author
- Christine Selinger (fl. from 2009), Canadian paracanoeist
- Emily Selinger (1848–1927), American painter, writer, poet, educator
- Greg Selinger (born 1951), Canadian politician
- Jean Paul Selinger (1850–1909), American painter
- Jerry Selinger (1935–2017), Canadian football player
- Joe Selinger (fl. 1956–1960), Canadian ice hockey player
- Joseph A. Sellinger (1921–1993), American Catholic priest and university president
  - Sellinger School of Business and Management
- Karl Selinger (1862-1899), Austrian Executioner during k.u.k. Monarchy
- Patricia Selinger (fl. 1971–2018), American computer scientist
- Philip R. Sellinger (born 1954), American lawyer
- Robin Selinger (fl. from 1995), American materials scientist
- Shelomo Selinger (born 1928), Israeli sculptor

== See also ==
- St. Leger family, an Anglo-Irish family with Norman roots, that in some cases transformed into Selinger or Sellinger
