= Àngel Llàcer =

Spanish actor, television and drama teacher

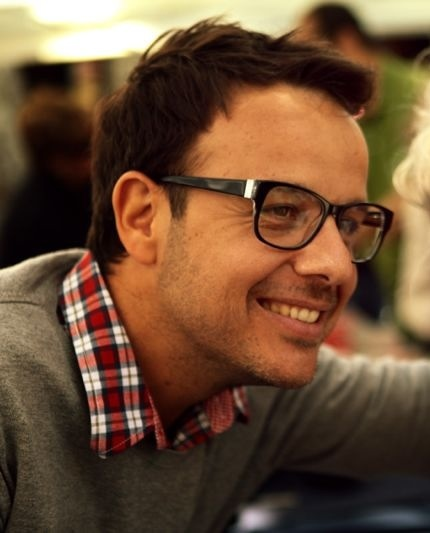
- Born: Àngel Llàcer Pinós; 16 January 1974 (age 52); Barcelona, Spain

Àngel Llàcer Pinós (born 16 January 1974 in Barcelona, Spain) is a Spanish actor, television presenter and drama teacher, known for being a judge on the Spanish reality show Tu cara me suena.

He attended the Institut del Teatre, en Barcelona (1996–1997), and completed his education in San Miniato (Italy) and Berlin. He has worked as a drama teacher at ESADE and on the TV show Operación Triunfo and made his directorial debut with A Midsummer Night's Dream.

== Theatre ==
- "Mala Sang" (1997)
- "El Somni de Mozart" (1998)
- "Mesura per Mesura" (1999)
- "Corre la Veu" (1999)
- "Mein Kampf" (1999)
- "La botiga dels horrors" (2000)
- "A Little Night Music" (2000–2001)
- "The Full Monty" (2001).
- "Salinger" (2002)
- "El somni d'una nit d'estiu" (2002)
- "Ja en tinc 30" (2004)
- "Teatre sense animals" (2004)
- "La màgia dels Kikids"; director and author (2005):
- "Tenim un problema" (2005)
- "Ya van 30" (2007)
- "Què, el nou musical" (2008)
- "Boeing, Boeing" (2009)
- "La doble vida d'en John" (2010)
- "Geronimo Stilton"; director (2010)
- "Madame Melville"; director (2011)
- "Splenda amb el Mag Lari" (2012)
- "El Petit Príncep"; director and actor (2014)
- "Molt soroll per no res" (Much Ado About Nothing), by William Shakespeare; director (2015)
- "Priscilla, la reina del desierto"; artistic director (2015)
- "Un cop a l'any"; director (2018)
- "Frankenstein"; actor (2018)
- "La jaula de las locas" (La Cage aux folles); director and actor (2018)

== Awards and nominations ==
Year	Award	Category	Work	Result
1998	Premi Butaca	Best Actor in a Musical	"El somni de Mozart"	Won
2000	Premi Butaca	Best Supporting Actor	"Mein Kampf"	Won
2001	Premi Butaca	Best Actor in a Musical	"A Little Night Music"	Nominated
2002	Premi Butaca	Best Actor in a Musical	"The Full Monty"	Won
2002	Premi Max	Best Supporting Actor	"The Full Monty"	Nominated
