= Orange County Museum of Art =

Contemporary art museum in California, US

UC Irvine Langson Orange County Museum of Art

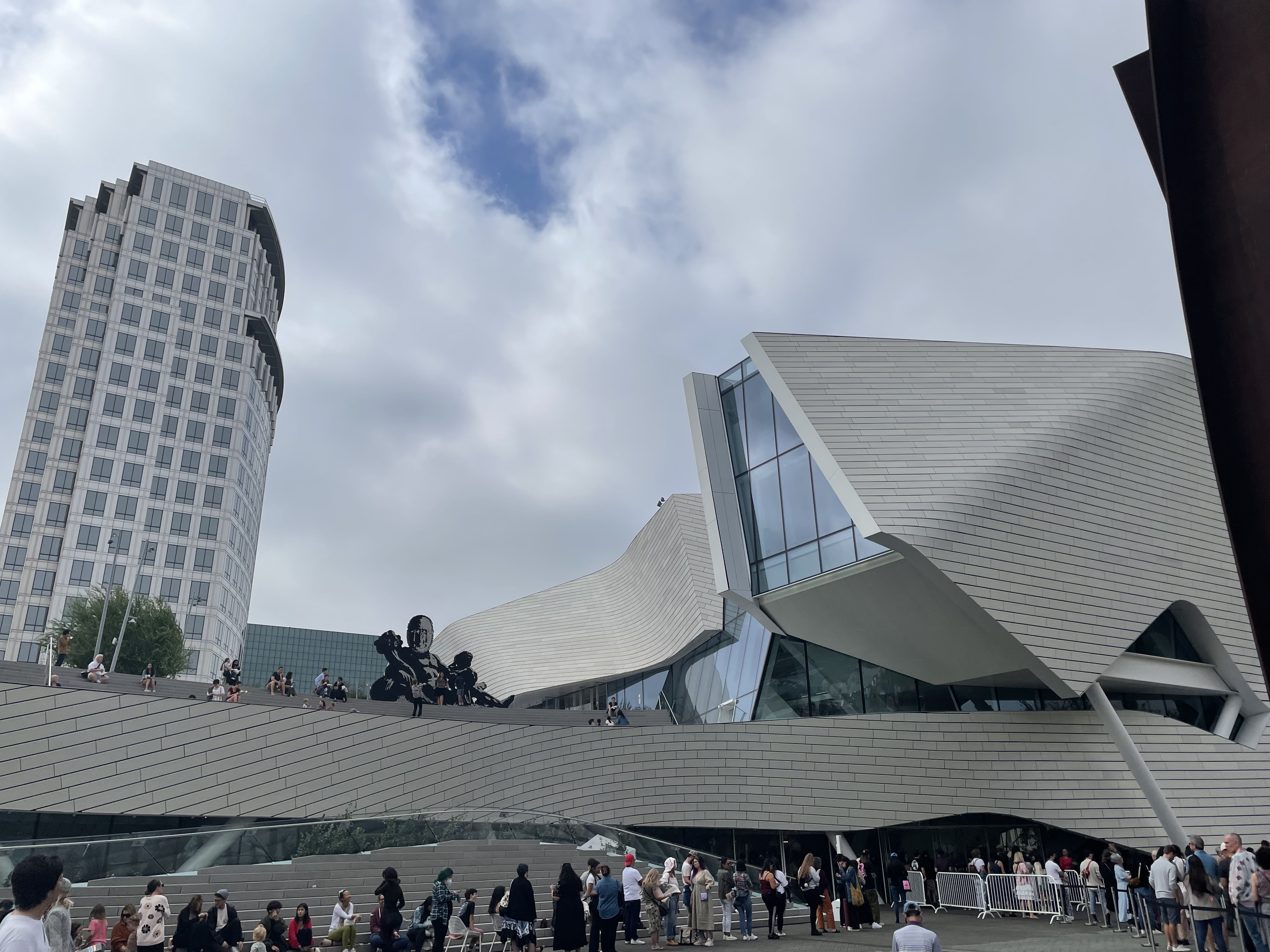
- The museum in 2022, during its grand reopening
- Established: 1962 (as Balboa Pavilion Gallery); 1968 (as Newport Art Museum); 1996 (as OCMA)
- Location: 3333 Avenue of the Arts, Costa Mesa, California 92626
- Type: Contemporary art museum
- Director: Heidi Zuckerman
- Architect: Thom Mayne
- Website: ocma.art

The UC Irvine Langson Orange County Museum of Art is a modern and contemporary art museum located on the campus of the Segerstrom Center for the Arts in Costa Mesa, California. The museum's collection comprises more than 4,500 objects, with a concentration on the art of California and the Pacific Rim from the early 20th century to present. Exhibits include traditional paintings, sculptures, and photography, as well as new media in the form of video, digital, and installation art.

== History ==
=== Fine Arts Patrons Pavilion Gallery, 1962–1968 ===
The museum was founded in 1962 as the Fine Arts Patrons Pavilion Gallery at the Balboa Pavilion by 13 women – Dorothy Ahmanson, Joan Brandt, Thelma Chastain, Em Cray, Dorothe Curtis, Kay Farwell, Ailene Hays, Judy Hurndall, Gloria Irvine, Jane Lawson, Betty Mickle, Florence Stoddard and Betty Winckler – who rented space on the pavilion's second floor in order to exhibit modern and contemporary art. Winckler served as its president until 1968, when the gallery changed its name and hired a professional staff.

=== Newport Harbor Art Museum, 1968–1996 ===
By 1968 the institution became known as the Newport Harbor Art Museum, and in 1972 moved to a nearby, larger location to a storefront on the Balboa Peninsula. In 1977 the museum opened its doors in Newport Beach at a 23,000 sq ft (2,100 m^{2}) space – with 7,714 sq ft (716.7 m^{2}) of exhibition space – designed by local architects Langdon & Wilson on San Clemente Drive in Fashion Island.

In 1981, Paul Schimmel was named chief curator/curator of exhibitions and collections at the Newport Harbor Art Museum. At age 27, he was the youngest chief curator in the museum's history. During his eight-year tenure, he sharpened the museum's focus on contemporary California art, bringing works by John Altoon, John Baldessari, Chris Burden, Vija Celmins, Robert Irwin, Edward Kienholz, David Park, Charles Ray, Allen Ruppersberg, and James Turrell into the permanent collection.

In 1982, the museum won accreditation by American Association of Museums. By the following year, the collection was worth $2 million, 4,500 members were signed up and annual attendance was 65,000. In 1985, the Irvine Company donated $1 million to underwrite major art exhibits at the museum for a decade.

In February 1987, the Irvine Company offered a 10-acre site at the intersection of East Coast Highway and MacArthur Boulevard as a "challenge gift" to the museum; to get title to the land, the museum would have had to raise $10.5 million in cash. By November 1987, museum officials announced Renzo Piano as the winner of an international search for an architect to design a new $25-million building. Preliminary drawings of Piano's plans for a one-story, 87,129 sq ft (8,094.5 m^{2}) building, unveiled in August 1989, showed a barrel-vaulted design that would be cut into the hillside to avoid violating local height restrictions. Visitors were to enter through the barrel-vaulted roof at parking lot-level and glide down to the lobby on an escalator. The response to the design was initially enthusiastic, but less than a year later, Piano lost the commission over assertions of escalating cost and insufficient gallery space. At the initiative of trustee Donald Bren, the museum's board hired Kohn Pedersen Fox instead. However, fund raising stalled at $10 million, and the title was never transferred.

=== Orange County Museum of Art, 1996–2018 ===
After favorable votes by the boards of trustees of both museums after years of on-and-off discussions, Attorney General of California Dan Lungren permitted Newport Harbor Art Museum to merge with Laguna Art Museum. The merger was completed in July 1996 and the newly combined organization was renamed the Orange County Museum of Art. The union lasted only nine months before, in April 1997, OCMA returned the deed of the Laguna Art Museum site to the LAM Heritage Corp., a nonprofit entity OCMA established as caretaker for the Laguna site. The 3,800-piece art collection the Laguna museum contributed to the OCMA merger remained in a third-party trust along with the 2,360 pieces formerly owned by Newport Harbor Art Museum. Both museums agreed on shared access to the collection for exhibition purposes. OCMA retained responsibility for storage and insurance of all the art.

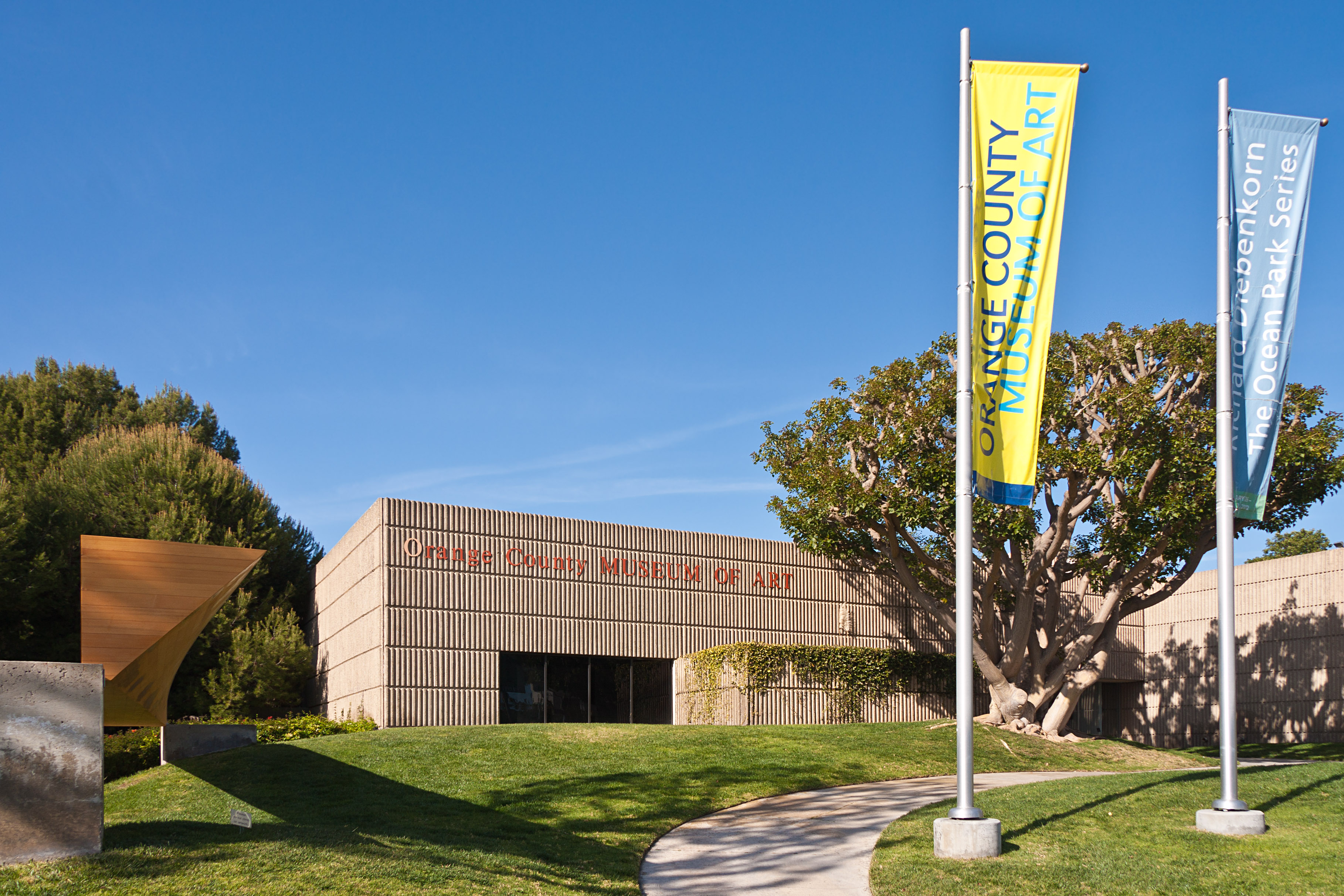
The San Clemente Drive location of OCMA in 2012

After the failed merger, incoming director Naomi Vine oversaw a $1.8-million expansion of OCMA designed by New York-based firm Archimuse that more than doubled the museum's size, with gallery space totalling 15,800 square feet (1,470 square metres). The project also involved carving two art studios and a classroom out of office space in the former Newport Beach Public Library next door, which also has a new 108-seat auditorium and a vastly enlarged collection storage area; the library building was donated to the museum by the Irvine Co. In 2004, the lobby was transformed on a tight budget by Bauer and Wiley Architects of Newport Beach.

In June 2008, OCMA announced its intent to pull up stakes from its longtime home at 850 San Clemente Drive in Newport Center when it was given title to a 1.64-acre parcel on Avenue of the Arts, on the condition that it break ground within five years. Shortly after, Thom Mayne was named to design the building.

==== Temporary space ====
OCMA opened a temporary space in a former Room & Board furniture store at South Coast Village on October 3, 2018 which served as its interim home during the construction of the permanent Segerstrom Center facility, with about 31,000 sq ft (2,900 m^{2}) total and 21,000 sq ft (2,000 m^{2}) of exhibition space. Known as OCMA Expand Santa Ana (stylized as OCMAEXPAND-SANTA ANA), the site featured exhibition seasons of approximately six months each in duration,

=== New building and acquisition by UC Irvine ===
On May 31, 2018, officials unveiled the design for the museum's new building at Segerstrom Center for the Arts in Costa Mesa created by Morphosis. The sale of the former Newport Beach site was announced on May 15, 2018. Groundbreaking for the three-story building took place in September 2019, with a projected opening in 2022. The structure was topped out on October 6, 2020.

The museum was temporarily closed on March 14, 2020, in accordance with quarantine efforts in response to the COVID-19 breakout in the United States. The facility was once again shuttered on November 16, 2020 amidst what local health officials described as a "second wave" of the virus in Orange County.

On October 8, 2022, OCMA opened its doors to the public for the first time with a 24-hour Grand Opening. Following from the design of Thom Mayne and Morphosis, the $93-million building features curving bands of terracotta paneling to create a distinctive visual character. With nearly 25,000 sq ft (2,300 m^{2}) of reconfigurable exhibition galleries — approximately 50 percent more than in the previous location — the new 52,000 sq ft (4,800 m^{2}) museum allows OCMA to organize major special exhibitions alongside spacious installations from its collection. It also features an additional 10,000 sq ft (930 m^{2}) for education programs, performances, and public gatherings, and include administrative offices, a gift shop, and a café.

In June 2025, OCMA and the University of California, Irvine signed a nonbinding letter of intent, which, if approved by the University of California Board of Regents, would bring the museum under the university's control, effectively merging it with UC Irvine's Langson Institute and Museum of California Art. The museum's acquisition by UC Irvine was completed in September 2025. In February 2026, Kathryn Kanjo became the inaugural director of the new museum.

== Exhibitions ==
The Orange County Museum of Art has organized exhibitions of contemporary art, including the first surveys of Vija Celmins (1980), Chris Burden (1988), and Tony Cragg (1990), as well as major exhibitions of work by Lari Pittman (1983), Gunther Forg (1989), Charles Ray (1990), Guillermo Kuitca (1992), Bill Viola (1997), Inigo Manglano-Ovalle (2003), Catherine Opie (2006), Mary Heilmann (2007), and Jack Goldstein (2012). Thematic exhibitions of contemporary art have ranged from Objectives: The New Sculpture (1990) which presented the work of Grenville Davey, Katharina Fritsch, Robert Gober, Jeff Koons, Annette Lemieus, Juan Muñoz, Julian Opie, and Haim Steinbach; Girls' Night Out (2003), which presented work by Eija-Liisa Ahtila, Elina Brotherus, Dorit Cypis, Rineke Dijkstra, Katy Grannan, Sarah Jones, Kelly Nipper, Daniela Rossell, Shirana Shahbazi, and Salla Tykka; and State of Mind: New California Art circa 1970, presenting an in-depth study of California artists in the 1960s and 1970s.

The museum has also organized and hosted exhibitions of modern art and design such as Edvard Munch: Expressionist Paintings, 1900–1940(1983), The Interpretive Link: Abstract Surrealism into Abstract Expressionism: Works on Paper, 1938–1948 (1986), The Figurative Fifties: New York Figurative Expressionism (1988), American Modern, 1925–1940: Design for a New Age (2001), Picasso to Pollock: Modern Masterpieces from the Wadsworth Atheneum Museum of Art (2004), Villa America: American Moderns 1900–1950 (2005), Birth of the Cool: Art, Design, and Culture at Midcentury (2007), and Illumination: The Paintings of Georgia O'Keeffe, Agnes Pelton, Agnes Martin, and Florence Miller Pierce (2009).

In 1984 the Museum launched the California Biennial, focusing on emerging artists in the state. In 2013, that program evolved into the California-Pacific Triennial, the first on-going exhibition in the Western Hemisphere devoted to contemporary art from around the Pacific Rim. The museum has co-organized exhibitions with the Renaissance Society, the Pennsylvania Academy of the Fine Arts, and the Grey Art Gallery, and its exhibitions have traveled to more than 30 museums throughout the United States and in Europe. These projects include Kutlug Ataman: Paradise (2007); Mary Heilmann: To Be Someone (2012); Jack Goldstein x 10,000 (2012); and Richard Jackson: Ain't Painting a Pain (2013).

Inaugural exhibitions in the current building included a return of the California Biennial exhibition titled California Biennial 2022: Pacific Gold, Fred Eversley: Reflecting Back (the World), and 13 Women in honor of the institution's founders.

== Collection ==
The museum's major holdings are California-based, highlighting such movements as Early and Mid-Century Modernism, Bay Area Figuration, Assemblage, California Light and Space, Pop Art, Minimalism, and Installation Art. Prominently featured are works by John Baldessari, Elmer Bischoff, Jessica Bronson, Chris Burden, Vija Celmins, Bruce Conner, Richard Diebenkorn, Robert Irwin, Helen Lundeberg, Stanton Macdonald-Wright, John McCracken, John McLaughlin, Catherine Opie, Alan Rath, Charles Ray, Edward Ruscha, and Bill Viola.

The museum's international holdings are a growing area of the collection, featuring work by Eija-Liisa Ahtila, Lee Bul, Katy Grannan, Joseph Grigely, Glenn Ligon, Christian Marclay, Inigo Manglano-Ovalle, Marjetica Potrc, David Reed, Daniela Rossell, and Lorna Simpson.

For the opening of its new building in 2022, the museum commissioned Of many waters … (2022), a large-scale work by Sanford Biggers. The site-specific piece — a 24-foot-wide, 16-foot-tall steel and aluminum sculpture — is an interactive piece, with benches on the back side of it that visitors can sit on, and installed on the museum's sculpture terrace.

=== Deaccessioning ===
In 2009, concerns were raised over the lack of public notice for its quiet sale of 18 of its 20 California Impressionist paintings for a total of $963,000 to a private collector.

== Management ==
=== Directors ===
- 1968–1972: Thomas H. Garver
- 1972–1974: James Byrnes
- 1976–1977: Harvey West
- 1977–1980: Thomas H. Garver
- 1980–1983: Cathleen Gallander
- 1983–1989: Kevin E. Consey
- 1991–1997: Michael Botwinick
- 1997–2001: Naomi Vine
- 2001–2002: Elizabeth Armstrong
- 2003–2013: Dennis Szakacs
- 2014: Dan Cameron
- 2014–2021: Todd DeShields Smith
- 2021–2025: Heidi Zuckerman
- 2025–present: Kathryn Kanjo

=== Budget ===
OCMA's annual operating budget has grown from about $1.8 million in 2018 to $8.5 million in 2023. In 2022, Lugano Diamonds of Newport Beach donated $2.5 million to allow OCMA to offer free admission for 10 years.
