= Eduardo Abaroa (artist) =

Mexican artist and writer (born 1968)

Eduaedo Abaroa
- Born: 1968 (age 57–58); Mexico City
- Education: National Autonomous University of Mexico; California Institute of the Arts
- Occupation: Artist

Eduardo Abaroa (born 1968) is a Mexican artist and writer working in the fields of sculpture, installation and performance.

Born in Mexico City in 1968, Abaroa received a bachelor's degree from the National School of Plastic Arts of the National Autonomous University of Mexico (UNAM) in 1999 and a Master of Fine Arts degree from the California Institute of the Arts (Valencia, California) in 2001. His work has been shown in Mexico, the United States, Spain, Germany, the United Kingdom, Canada, South Korea, and other countries. As a writer, he has contributed texts for exhibition catalogues of artists Francis Alÿs, Melanie Smith, Pablo Vargas Lugo, Tercerunquinto and Dr Lakra, among others. He was also an art reviewer for the newspaper Reforma and has written for other publications like Curare, Código 06140, Moho, 95La Tempestad95, the Journal of Aesthetics & Protest, and the Argentinian magazine Ramona.

Abaroa was a founding member of the alternative artist-run space Temístocles 44, along with Pablo Vargas Lugo, Abraham Cruzvillegas, Daniela Rossell, and Sofía Táboas. Founded in 1993 in an abandoned house owned by Haydee Rovirosa in Polanco, Temístocles 44 was a space were exhibitions, artist discussions, lectures, talks and informal workshops took place. This group of artists renewed Mexican art through the negation of painting in favor of other mediums. Inspired by the mass media they created ephemeral works.

Abaroa directed the ninth International Symposium of Art Theory (Simposio Internacional de Teoría Sobre Arte Contemporáneo, SITAC) in Mexico City, and is currently course director of the Education Program at SOMA, a Mexico City arts organization.
