= Scarab (fraternity) =

American architectural fraternity

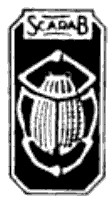
- Founded: February 25, 1909; 117 years ago University of Illinois
- Type: Professional
- Former affiliation: PFA
- Status: Defunct
- Defunct date: c. 1975
- Emphasis: Architecture
- Scope: National
- Colors: Yale Blue
- Publication: Scarab Bulletin; The Hieratic
- Chapters: 16
- Headquarters: United States

Scarab was a professional fraternity in the field of architecture. It was founded in 1909 at the University of Illinois at Urbana-Champaign as the first group of its kind for architecture.

== History ==
Scarab was founded on February 25, 1909, at the University of Illinois at Urbana-Champaign. Its members were students of architecture, landscape architecture, or architectural engineering.

Annually, each chapter held an exhibition of its best work. Chapters also issued a bronze or silver medal annually for excellence in architectural design in a competition that was open to any student at its institution. The national fraternity sponsored the annual Scarab National Competition.

The fraternity was governed by a supreme council that met during the annual convention. Its publication was The Hieratic. It also published the Scarab Bulletin twice a year.

Archival materials related to Scarab are housed at Carnegie Mellon University Libraries, Rensselaer Polytechnic Institute Archives, and the University of Illinois Archives.

It is unknown when most chapters ceased operations; the mother chapter, at Illinois, ceased activity circa 1971.

== Symbols and Traditions ==
The color for Scarab is Yale Blue.

== Chapter list ==
Scarab's chapters were called temples. A list of its temples follows.

Temple	Charter date and range	Institution	Location	Status	Ref.
Karnak	February 25, 1909 – c. 1971	University of Illinois Urbana-Champaign	Urbana and Champaign, Illinois	Inactive	
Ipsamboul	1914	Washington University in St. Louis	St. Louis County, Missouri	Inactive	
Edfou	1915-1942	Illinois Institute of Technology	Chicago, Illinois	Inactive	(Note: Withdrew from National Scarab because of the national fraternity’s membership restriction to "men of the Aryan race and Christian religion.")
Thebes	1916	Pennsylvania State University	University Park, Pennsylvania	Inactive	
Philae	1920	Carnegie Mellon University	Pittsburgh, Pennsylvania	Inactive	
Luxor	1921–c. 1927	Massachusetts Institute of Technology	Cambridge, Massachusetts	Inactive	
Abydos	1921	University of Kansas	Lawrence, Kansas	Inactive	(Note: Absorbed Alpha Kappa Chi.)
Ammon	1926	George Washington University	Washington, D.C.	Inactive	
Khons	1926	University of Minnesota	Minneapolis, Minnesota	Inactive	
Isis	1927	University of Southern California	Los Angeles, California	Inactive	
Hathor	1928	University of Virginia	Charlottesville, Virginia	Inactive	
Osiris	1929	University of Cincinnati	Cincinnati, Ohio	Inactive	
Horus	1932	Washington State University	Pullman, Washington	Inactive	
Khufu	1931 - 19xx ; February 5, 1946	Auburn University	Auburn, Alabama	Inactive	(Note: Formerly local Botegha founded in 1919, charter petition accepted by Scarab Convention November 23-24, 1931 at Cincinnati, Ohio)
Anubis	1954	California State Polytechnic University, Pomona	Pomona, California	Inactive	(Note: Cal Poly-Pomona was the southern campus of Cal Poly-San Luis Obispo when this chapter was formed.)
Amenkotep	1955	Rensselaer Polytechnic Institute	Troy, New York	Inactive	

== Notable members ==
- William Francis Cody, architect
- Raymond Eastwood, artist
- A. (Abraham) William Hajjar, architect
- Robert A. Kennard, African American architect
- Robert E. Langdon Jr., architect
- Arthur Silvers, African American architect
- Louis Sullivan, architect
- Gordon Greenfield Wittenberg, architect

== See also ==
- Professional fraternities and sororities
