= A. (Abraham) William Hajjar =

American architect

Abraham William Hajjar (11 Feb 1917 – 23 Dec 2000) was an American architect active in Pennsylvania and Southern California particularly during the 1950s and 1960s. He created many modern residences, taught architectural design and history courses at The Pennsylvania State University, and conducted research on an early version of the double-skin glass facade, which later became a significant passive solar design element.

== Early life ==
Hajjar was born on February 11, 1917. His parents, Milahem (or Melhem) and Sadie Ary Hajjar had immigrated to the United States thirty years before. Hajjar grew up in Lawrence, Massachusetts. He then attended Carnegie Institute of Technology, now Carnegie Mellon, where he was a member of the architecture fraternity Scarab. He went on to receive his Masters in Architecture degree at MIT in the winter of 1941.

== Teaching and research ==
In 1946, Hajjar began teaching at Penn State University where he would remain until 1963. Hajjar led design studios that encouraged students to reconsider local planning in State College and Bellefonte. The proposals the students developed under his leadership focused on blending the downtown with car culture, while providing pedestrian areas, not unlike trends seen in New Urbanism twenty years later. Hajjar also initiated a project to explore alternative methods of heating and cooling. With funding from Pittsburgh Plate Glass (later PPG) and the participation of engineering professors Vincent L. Pass and E.R. McLaughlin, Hajjar designed and built the Air Wall Test Building in 1959–1961. This structure used two glass curtain walls spaced three feet apart to capture and employ solar gain in a manner similar to modern double skin facades. After Alton Blakeslee, a science writer for Associated Press, reported on this project, it appeared in local newspapers across the country. Hajjar created several designs using the strategy, including an office building and a house, but they were never constructed. Double-skin glass facades have been more commonly employed since the 1980s.

== Design career ==
From the earliest years of his career Hajjar focused on the affordable single family home. He was a runner up in the Productive Homes Competition in 1939 which encouraged architects to think about “rurban” living - suburban settings with space to grow food. Hajjar's work received national attention when he partnered with Ronald Whiteley to design a small house which won Honorable Mention in the Rocky Mountain Region in a competition sponsored by Architectural Forum and the NAHB. Residential architecture composed the majority of his designs and completed buildings in central Pennsylvania though he created designs for a range of residence types from apartment complexes to single family home designs. His trademarks included utilizing traditional materials such as stone, brick, or wood cladding in contemporary forms. He strove to provide privacy, despite his use of glass through attention to orientation on the lot and screening. While in State College, he designed several speculative homes for both local real estate firms and his own ventures. In the early 1960s he began to associate himself with Philadelphia architects such as Vincent Kling. By 1969, Hajjar had moved to La Jolla, California. His earlier interest in speculative housing reemerged, and he constructed a condominium complex in La Jolla in the years just before his retirement.

== Key designs ==
Architect's House, State College, PA 1958-1959

Project Houses, #1-4, State College, PA 1960

Air Wall Test Building, University Park, PA 1959

Easterly Parkway Elementary School, State College, PA 1953-1954

Villa Court Apartments State College, PA

HRB Singer Inc., Science Park Buildings #3, #4, and #5, State College, PA, 1959-1960

See the Sea, La Jolla, CA, 1967

== Legacy ==
Hajjar died December 23, 2000, in La Jolla, California. While his influence in the broader architectural field was muted, Hajjar was one of the architects who encouraged the development of Modern architecture in central Pennsylvania. He also encouraged a popular audience to think about new uses for glass facades and energy-efficient design.
