= 9454 Wilshire Boulevard =

Office building in Beverly Hills, California (USA)

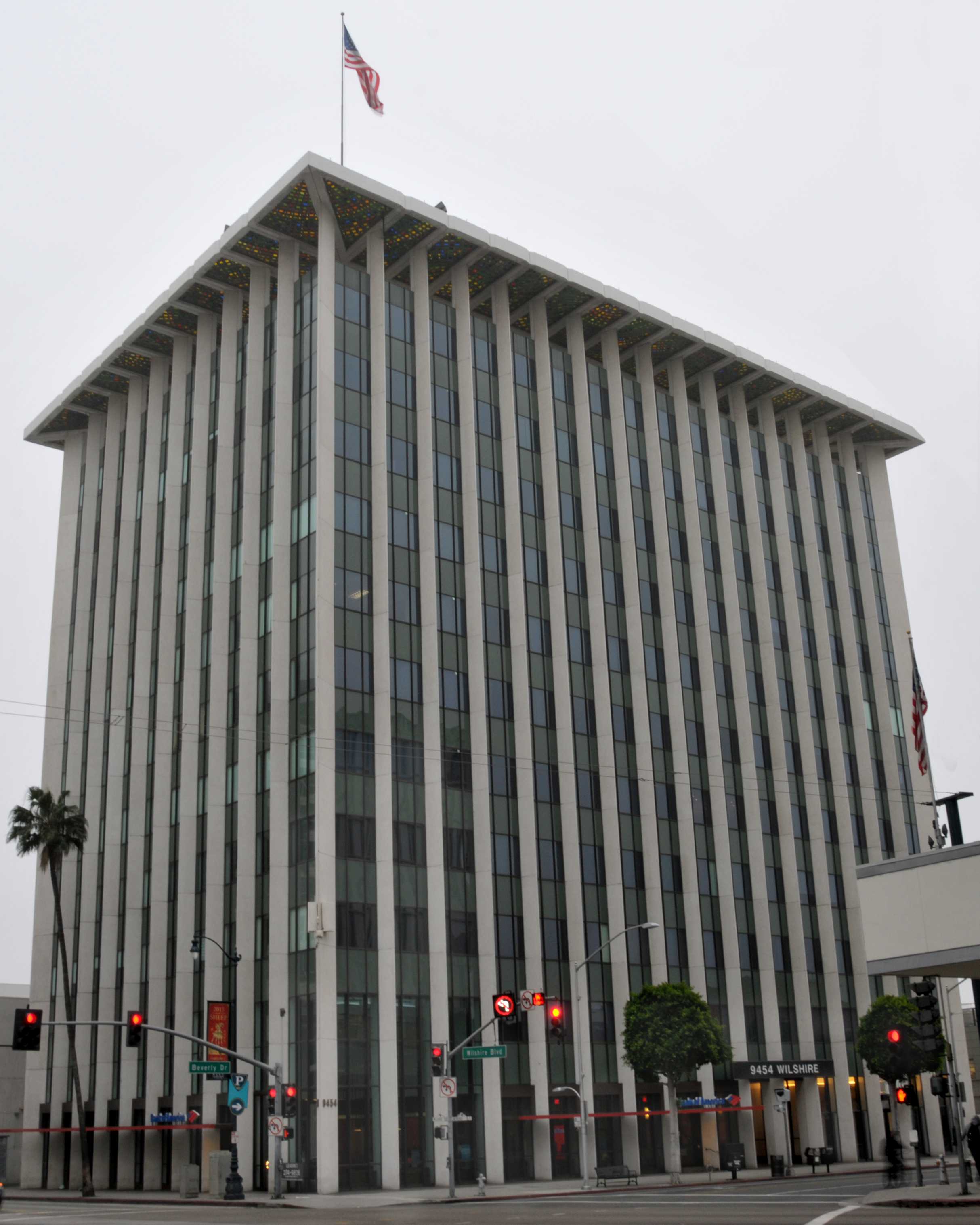

- Location within the Los Angeles metropolitan area
- Former names: Glendale Federal Savings
- Alternative names: The Bank of America Tower

General information
- Status: Completed
- Type: Commercial high-rise
- Architectural style: Modern New Formalist
- Location: 9454 Wilshire Boulevard, Beverly Hills, California, United States
- Coordinates: 34.0667°N 118.3988°W
- Elevation: 228 ft (69 m)
- Current tenants: Bank of America; JPMorgan Chase; Ferrari; Compass Group; First American Corporation
- Opened: 1968; 58 years ago
- Owner: Beverly Wilshire Investment Company, LLC

Technical details
- Floor count: 12
- Floor area: 15,350 rentable ft^{2}
- Lifts/elevators: 4

Design and construction
- Architects: Robert E. Langdon, Jr.; Ernest C. Wilson, Jr.

Other information
- Parking: Underground garage (3 levels)

Website
- www.9454wilshire.com

9454 Wilshire Boulevard, also known as The Bank of America Tower, is a 174,490 RSF (rentable square feet), 12-story landmark office building with a three-level underground parking lot located in Beverly Hills, California at the corner of Beverly Drive and Wilshire Boulevard. Beverly Wilshire Investment Company, LLC, a real estate holding company owned and controlled by the Nourafchan Family, owns the building.

== Location ==
The building is located at 9454 on Wilshire Boulevard in the City of Beverly Hills.

== History ==
The building was built for the Glendale Federal Savings and Loan Association. It was completed in 1968. It was designed by architects Robert E. Langdon, Jr. and Ernest C. Wilson, Jr. The cornice is made of dalle de verre, thus giving the impression of rainbow-like reflections as one gets closer to the building.

It was the first high-rise building in the Beverly Hills section of Wilshire Boulevard. It is a twelve-story high-rise, making it the tallest office building and the second tallest building in Beverly Hills after the Beverly Wilshire Hotel. The Beverly Hills City Council required the developer to create a green space in exchange for the height of the building. As a result, Reeves Park, a pocket park, was created.

There is a three-level subterranean parking lot underneath the building.

In 1981, the building was purchased by the Beverly Wilshire Investment Company, LLC. There is currently a Bank of America branch on the first floor.

Notable tenants include Bank of America, JP Morgan Chase, Ferrari, Compass, and First American Title Company.
