= Juliana Laffitte =

Argentine artist

Juliana Laffitte is an Argentine artist, mother and wife from Buenos Aires. She is part of the art collective, Mondongo.

== Biography ==
Juliana Laffitte is a classically trained artist from Buenos Aires, Argentina born in 1974. Juliana Laffitte grew up in an Evangelic household where she witnessed several exorcisms.

Laffitte attended to Escuela Nacional de Bellas Artes Prilidiano Pueyrredón in Buenos Aires for 5 years, where she studied traditional art. While there, she met her husband Manuel Mendanha. Her education has equipped her with a strong understanding of traditional art and world issues. She often incorporates social, racial and local issues into her art. Escuela Nacional de Bellas Artes Prilidiano Pueyrredón is a highly respected art institute in Buenos Aires that's faculty alumni include world-famous artists such as Rogelio Yrurtia and Fernando Fader.

She is part of an artist group named Mondongo, with Manuel Mendanha and Agustina Picasso. Lafitte is married to Manuel Mendanha, a fellow traditional artist from Buenos Aires, whom she met at Escuela Nacional de Bellas Artes Prilidiano Pueyrredón; they have a child together. Currently, she lives and works in Buenos Aires, while having exhibitions the past few decades in Los Angeles. She has stated that she chooses to work in other cities for inspiration. Today, Mondongo is solely a duo composed of Laffitte and Mendanha. She and the group have broken into the public eye by creating art not only for the traditional art community but also for the fashion and street communities. The founding principle of Mondongo is working in group and to make their art a massive issue.

The studio that Mondongo operates out of is privately owned in Buenos Aires, but is open to visitors. The studio and surrounding area not only supports, but encourages conversation. The idea of conversation can be seen in many of her pieces via symbols like masks and faces. Laffitte's cousin was shot years ago by the Argentine army which inspires many of her pieces.

== Artworks ==
Juliana Laffitte is noted for her use of unconventional materials

In 2004, The Spanish Royal Family commissioned Juliana Laffitte and Mondongo to create portraits of the family. In 2008, Mondongo was asked to create a piece for the Comme des Garçons mailers list. The piece was targeted towards Comme des Garçons's best customers, partners and VIPs.

2004: 32 Red riding hoods with empty basket without wolf is a piece from the Red Series by Mondongo. The medium is Plasticine on wood panel. The piece takes the familiar folktale known globally and incorporates aspects of Latin American culture. Main influence is mainstream and pop culture.

2004: Dancing with myself. in the Red Series by Monondgo Plasticine on wood panel as the medium. The piece uses wood panel as the medium to reflect on childhood but also used to create stop-motion animation. The main influence is societal stereotypes and social injustice. The piece successfully incorporates the use of the subconscious and conscious.

2008: Dover Street Market: Printed Matter: Beans. Comme des Garçons is an iconic fashion and streetwear company based out of France. They have a long history developing pieces and shows with upcoming artists. In the piece Beans, Mondongo uses visceral texture through nonconventional mediums like biscuits to invoke sinister and sexual undertones. The piece includes portraits, but is considered participatory art. The medium is an inverted collage. The purpose of the piece is to deliver an artistic piece when Comme des Garçons and Dover Street Market invited VIP and guests back in 2008.

== Exhibitions ==
All of the following are Mondongo pieces:

- 2000: La primera Cena, Centro Cultural Recoleta, Buenos Aires, Argentina
- 2002: Portraits, Gallery Braga Menéndez, Buenos Aires, Argentina
- 2004: Cumbre, Casa de América [es], Madrid, Spain
- 2004: La boca del lobo, Gallery Maman, Buenos Aires, Argentina
- 2005: From B.A. to L.A. (with other Argentine artists), Santa Monica, California, US
- 2005: Merca, Gallery Ruth Benzacar, Buenos Aires, Argentina
- 2007: thread/bare, Track 16 Gallery, Los Angeles, US
- 2009: Silencio, Gallery Ruth Benzacar, Buenos Aires, Argentina
- 2009: Maddox Arts, London, England
- 2012: Art Sawa, Dubai International Financial Centre, United Arab Emirates
- 2013: Argentina, Buenos Aires Museum of Modern Art, Argentina
- 2016: Paisajes, MAXXI, Rome, Italy

== Collections ==
“What Are We Gonna Say After Hello?" is Juliana Laffitte latest collection. It was shown at Track 16 gallery of the Bendix Building in the Los Angeles Fashion District on February 10, 2018. The collection was raved by art enthusuits and will be shown in Brazil in 2019. Many art critics praised the work for successfully combining the subconscious thought and mourning—the inexhaustible feeling anchored in childhood and playing.

June–August 2017: The Portfolio Series is a collection that included Mondongo. At the museum of Latin American Art (MOLAA), pieces from the Red Series were included in the Portfolio series. The most popular piece from the Red Series was 32 Red riding hoods with empty basket without wolf which was included in the collection. Another piece included in the collection was Dancing with myself. Track 16 interpreted the piece as a narcissistic house of mirrors of the powerful antagonist.

Red Series is the collection that Mondongo broke into the public spotlight with. Formerly known as "What a Big Mouth You Have", the collection latter changed its name when the Black series was released. Red Series is a collection of fourteen works originally exhibited in Buenos Aires before traveling the world. Red Series originally debuted in 2004, but has been moved several times since.

== Bibliography ==
Artusa, Marina. “Mondongo: Los Artistas De La Plastilina Conquistan Roma.” 10/02/2016 - Clarín.com, Clarín, 10 Feb. 2016, www.clarin.com/cultura/mondongo-arte-roma-maxxi_0_SkzXFauP7e.html.

“Portfolio Series: Mondongo.” Molaa, molaa.org/copy-of-portfolio-series-mondongo.

Andymeetswarhol. “Comme Des Garçons – ARTxMAIL.” ANDY MEETS WARHOL, 4 Oct. 2017, andymeetswarhol.ch/2015/05/26/comme-des-garcons-mail-art-meets-fashion-japanese-art/.

Bitong, Anna. “This Argentinian Art Collective Makes Epic Artwork Out of the Strangest Materials.” KCET, 22 Mar. 2018, www.kcet.org/shows/artbound/argentinian-art-collective-explores-unusual-materials-in-their-epic-works.
