= Ernest C. Wilson Jr. =

American architect

- Born: May 15, 1924; Burbank, Los Angeles County, California
- Died: August 18, 1992 (aged 68); Newport Beach, Orange County, California
- Education: University of Southern California
- Occupations: Architect, real estate developer
- Spouse: Shirley Wilson
- Children: Peter Wilson; Ernest Wilson, III; Caroline (Wilson) Grazioli

Ernest C. Wilson Jr. (May 15, 1924 – August 18, 1992) was an American architect and real estate developer based in Newport Beach, California. He designed many office buildings in San Diego and Orange County, as well as the Richard Nixon Presidential Library and Museum in Yorba Linda, California. With partners Robert E. Langdon Jr. and Hans Mumper, he designed the Getty Villa in the Pacific Palisades as well as the Bank of America Building in Beverly Hills. As President of Koll International, he masterplanned and developed many hotels and golf clubs in Baja California, Mexico.

== Early life ==
Ernest Clifford Wilson Jr. was born on May 15, 1924, in Burbank, California. He graduated from the University of Southern California in Los Angeles, where he studied Architecture and played football with the Trojans.

== Career ==
The Getty Villa in the Pacific Palisades.

In 1949, he partnered with fellow USC graduate in Architecture Robert E. Langdon Jr. to form an architectural firm. Two years later, in 1951, they officially founded Langdon Wilson. The firm had offices in Los Angeles and Newport Beach. While Langdon oversaw design projects in the LA area, Wilson took care of projects in and around Newport Beach. However, Wilson is credited with co-designing at least two buildings in Los Angeles County with Langdon: the Getty Villa in the Pacific Palisades and the Bank of America Building in Beverly Hills.

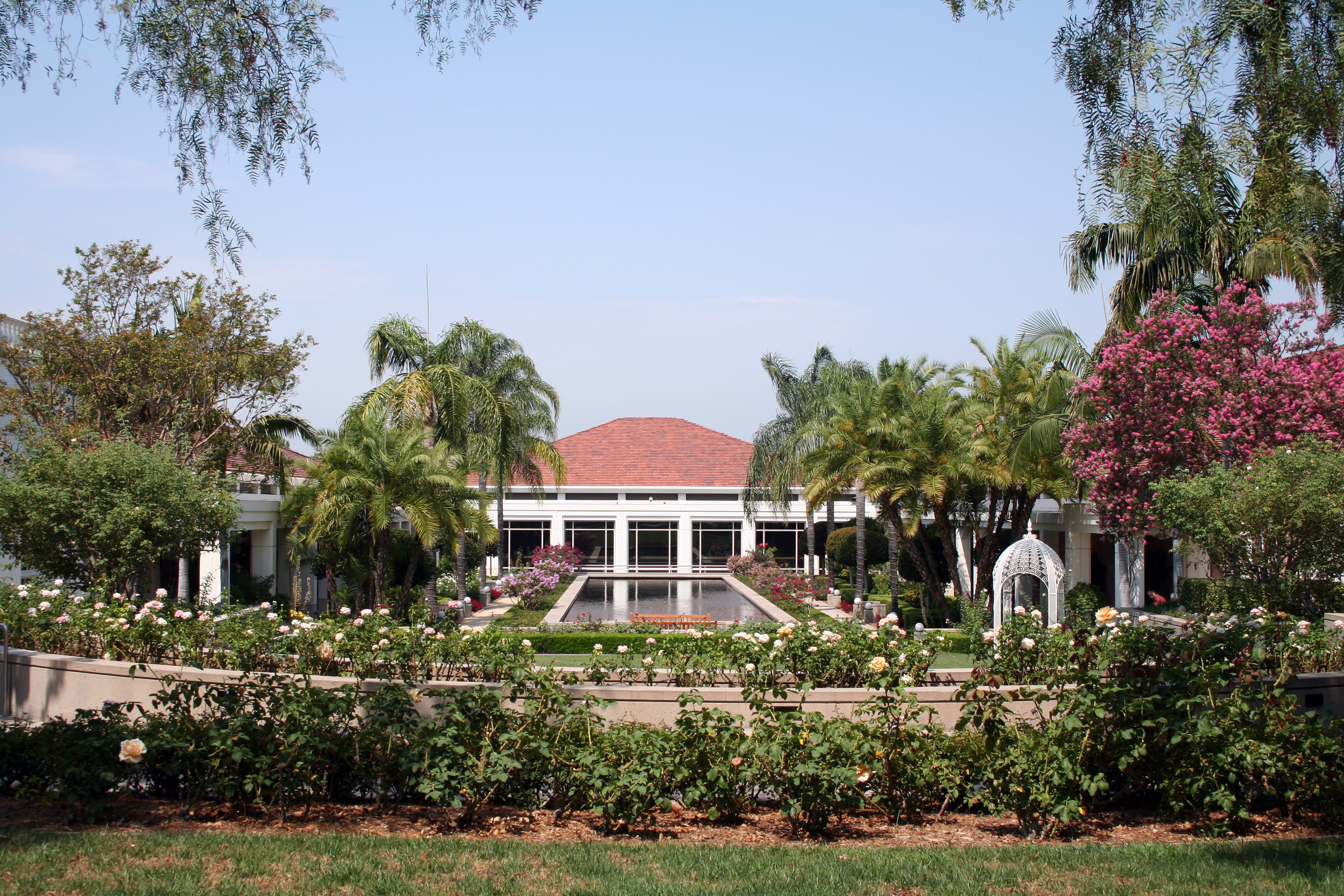
Richard Nixon Presidential Library and Museum.

He designed high-rise buildings in San Diego and Orange County. He was also the master planner of the Irvine Spectrum in Irvine and the Koll Center Financial Plaza in Newport Beach. Moreover, he oversaw the designs of the Richard Nixon Presidential Library and Museum in Yorba Linda, named for U.S. President Richard M. Nixon.

Additionally, he served as the President of Koll International, a real estate development firm. He masterplanned and developed many hotels and golf resorts in Baja California, Mexico.

He was a member of the American Institute of Architects. He served on the board of directors of the Newport Harbor Art Museum.

== Personal life ==
He was married to Shirley Wilson. They had two sons, Peter Wilson and Ernest Wilson, III, and a daughter, Caroline (Wilson) Grazioli. They resided in Newport Beach, where he was a member of the Newport Harbor Yacht Club. He was also a pilot and yachtsman, competing in regattas aboard his yacht called Westerly.

== Death ==
He died on August 18, 1992, at the Hoag Hospital in Newport Beach, California. He was sixty-eight years old.
