= Lafitte (surname) =

Lafitte is a French surname. Notable people with the surname include:

- André-Joseph Lafitte-Clavé, French army engineer
- Ed Lafitte, baseball pitcher
- Fermín Emilio Lafitte, Argentine archbishop
- Guy Lafitte, French tenor saxophonist
- Jean Lafitte, French privateer
- José White Lafitte, Cuban violinist
- Laurent Lafitte, French actor
- Pierre Lafitte, brother of Jean
- Pierre Lafitte Ithurralde, French Basque priest and author
- Yasmine Lafitte, Moroccan pornographic actress

== See also ==
- Laffitte (disambiguation), including some people with that surname
