= Salinger =

Salinger is a surname. Notable people with the surname include:

- Conrad Salinger (1901–1962), American arranger-orchestrator and composer
- Diane Salinger (born 1951), American actress and voice actress
- J. D. Salinger (1919–2010), American writer and author of Catcher in the Rye
  - Salinger (film), a 2013 documentary film about the American author
  - Salinger (book), a 2013 biography about the American author
- Lawrence M. Salinger (1958–2013), professor of criminology and sociology
- Margaretta Salinger (1907–1985), American art historian and curator
- Matt Salinger (born 1960), American actor, the son of author J. D. Salinger and psychologist Claire Douglas
- Michael Salinger (born 1962), American poet, performer, and educator living in Northeast Ohio
- Pierre Salinger (1925–2004), John F. Kennedy's press secretary
- Stefan Salinger (born 1965), Austrian curler

== See also ==
- Selinger
- Sellinger
