= Daniela Rossell =

Mexican photographer (born 1973)

Daniela Rossell (born 1973, Mexico City) is a Mexican photographer best known for her portraits of the privileged Mexican elite, of which she herself is a member. Her best-known photographic work was published in 2002 under the title Ricas y Famosas, which is a photographic series portraying upper-class Mexican women, many whom had connections to the PRI Institutional Revolutionary Party.

== Life ==
Rossell was born into the elite class she would later photograph. She is the granddaughter of two former Mexican governors. Her mother was an art collector, and Rossell was raised with an appreciation for fine art. She was educated at the American School Foundation, an exclusive and academically rigorous prep school in Mexico City. There, she developed an interest in theatre and began acting at age sixteen. She studied acting at the Núcleo de Estudios Teatrales. She then briefly studied painting at the National School of Visual Arts, but left to pursue a career in photography.

Rossell currently lives and works in Mexico City and shows throughout Latin America, Europe and the United States.

== Art ==
The photographic series Daniela Rossell is best known for is Ricas y Famosas (Rich and Famous), which spanned over the years 1994-2001 and was published as a book in 2009 (Oceano De Mexico, ASIN B01FELMQJM

The first models for these photographs were the friends and family of the artist, who were Mexican elite, and then began to spread to other elite women who volunteered to model. Each model chooses how to depict their identity surrounded by their lavish material items and selling sex appeal in their poses. Rossell believes that her models are influenced by magazines and television shows in how they should perform in front of the camera because they want to look American. This quest to look American requires these models to modify their lifestyle and manipulation of identity that is a form of unhappiness. Despite having materialistically everything, these women struggle to find satisfaction in who they are because of the fantasy portrayed of America. When looking at the photographs is the large amounts of art and non-Christian icons mixed with Christian art found in these lavish homes. For example, one woman is posed lying seductively across a massive sized Buddha surrounded by champagne and money. The juxtaposition between sacred object and sexual attraction makes for a conflicting yet entertaining subject.

One of the themes of the series is femininity and the role of women. The artist describes the home as the territory of the women, and by taking pictures of women within their own homes we are granted a glimpse into this constructed world. For example, one of the subjects surrounds herself with self-portraits and includes her personal waiter in the scene, putting on display that this is a space dedicated to her. In these highly cluttered environments the female models blend in with the lavish objects and Rossell uses this composition to reemphasize the objectifying of women in photographs. Often seen in fashion and commercial advertising campaigns the women photographed become synonymous with the object being sold.

Another theme that is found in the series is Mexican history and identity. Rather than depicting the romanticized views of the Mexican villages or the harsh images of the urban poor, Rossell depicts the wealthy minority. Rossell herself is a part of this demographic and in turn this is the Mexican history she relates to. Also, the elite lives of her subjects were unknown to the rest of Mexico, her photographs also serve as social and political documents. After the release of her book Ricas y Famosas, the people who originally had been eager to model were angry with the artist. The public praised Rossell for her cinematic eye and ability to create provocative photos showing that flashy lifestyles are visible in all cultures.

== Criticism ==
In writing about Rossell's portraits of the Mexican elite, Slate Magazine observed:

The narrative of Mexico as our impoverished and drug cartel–ridden neighbor dominates most news coverage in America, but that’s only one part of a large and diverse country. Photographer Daniela Rossell brings us tales of the polar opposite segment of Mexican society with her series Ricas y Famosas, which depicts the children of Mexico’s most privileged class of society.

In discussing the same series of photographs, The New York Times wrote:

''Ricas y Famosas,'' a book of 89 photographs, is not an exercise in kitsch fantasy. Part Town and Country, part Playboy, the book exposes the decadent, some say depraved, lifestyles of Mexico's wealthy elite -- or, as the title would have it, the rich and famous.

== Exhibitions ==
Her photographs have been exhibited worldwide, most notably at:

- Tate Modern, London, UK
- The National Museum of Women in the Arts, Washington, DC
- MoMA PS1, New York, NY
- ArtSpace San Antonio, San Antonio, Texas
- Kunsthallen Nikolaj, Copenhagen Contemporary Art Center, Copenhagen, Denmark
- San Francisco Museum of Modern Art, San Francisco, California
- The Blaffer Art Museum at the University of Houston, Houston, TX
- Hammer Museum at UCLA, Los Angeles, CA
- The Whitechapel Gallery, London, UK
- Weatherspoon Art Museum, Greensboro, NC

== Collections ==
Her work is the following public collections:

- The San Francisco Museum of Modern Art, California
- Tate Gallery, London
- The Orange County Museum of Art, California
- New Museum of Contemporary Art, New York, NY
- Weatherspoon Art Museum, Greensboro, NC
- MoMA PS1, New York, NY
- J. Paul Getty Museum, Los Angeles, CA
- Museum of Contemporary Art, Chicago, Illinois
- Hood Art Museum at Dartmouth College, New Hampshire
- Mint Museum, Charlotte, North Carolina
- St. Louis Art Museum, St. Louis, Missouri
- Nassau County Museum of Art, Roslyn Harbor, New York
- Hessel Museum of Art, Annandale-on-Hudson, NY
- Colección Júmex, Mexico City, Mexico
