= Laffitte =

Laffitte is a surname of French origin. Notable people with that name include:

- Hector Manuel Laffitte (born 1934), former United States federal judge
- Jacques Laffitte (1767–1844), French banker and politician
  - Cabinet of Jacques Laffitte, a French government ministry of 1830–31
- Jean Laffitte (born 1952), French official in the Roman Catholic church
- Juliana Laffitte (born 1974), Argentine artist
- Louis Laffitte, pseudonym of French novelist Jean-Louis Curtis (1917–95)
- Pierre Laffitte (philosopher) (1823–1903), French positivist

== Other uses ==
- Maisons-Laffitte, a commune in the Yvelines department in the Île-de-France region in north-central France
  - Gare de Maisons-Laffitte, a railway station
  - Maisons-Laffitte Racecourse
    - Critérium de Maisons-Laffitte, a horse race
    - La Coupe de Maisons-Laffitte, a horse race
- Rue Laffitte, a street in Paris

== See also ==
- Jacques Laffite (born 1943), French Formula One racing driver active 1974–86
- Fermín Emilio Lafitte (1888–1959), Argentine Roman Catholic cleric
