= Robert E. Langdon Jr. =

American architect

- Born: Robert Earl Langdon Jr. May 31, 1918; Council Bluffs, Iowa
- Died: August 13, 2004 (aged 86); Pasadena, California
- Education: Yale University; University of Southern California
- Occupation: Architect
- Spouse: Jacqueline (Hughes) Langdon
- Children: Robert Langdon, III; Jan (Langdon) Handtmann

Robert Earl Langdon Jr. (May 31, 1918 – August 13, 2004) was an American architect based in Los Angeles, California. With Ernest C. Wilson Jr., he designed 27 office buildings along Wilshire Boulevard as well as the Getty Villa in the Pacific Palisades and the Bank of America Building in Beverly Hills. He was the President of the Pasadena chapter of the American Institute of Architects.

== Early life ==
Robert E. Langdon Jr. was born in Council Bluffs, Iowa. He attended Yale University in New Haven, Connecticut. He went on to graduate from the School of Architecture at the University of Southern California in 1944.

== Career ==
He started his career by designing buildings for his alma mater, the University of Southern California, whose campus grew shortly after World War II.

In 1949, he partnered with Ernest C. Wilson Jr., a fellow USC graduate in Architecture, to start an architectural firm. Two years later, in 1951, they officially named it Langdon & Wilson. Shortly after, they opened offices in Los Angeles and Newport Beach. Later, they partnered with fellow architect Hans Mumper, renaming the firm Langdon, Wilson & Mumper. Eventually, they changed the name again to Langdon Wilson Architects. They had 125 employees. Langdon served as the chairman of the Los Angeles office, overseeing design projects in the LA area.

The Getty Villa in the Pacific Palisades.

The firm designed the Getty Villa in the Pacific Palisades, which makes up the J. Paul Getty Museum with the Getty Center in nearby Brentwood. They also designed the Glendale Federal Savings Building, also known as the Bank of America Building, or 9454 Wilshire Boulevard in Beverly Hills. Another notable building they designed was the CNA Tower, located at 6th Street and Commonwealth Avenue, and completed in 1972. Overall, they designed twenty-seven buildings along Wilshire Boulevard. They also designed the factory of the Hughes Aircraft-Electro Optical Systems in El Segundo.

Langdon served as the President of the Pasadena Chapter as well as the Director of the California Council of the American Institute of Architects. Additionally, he was the national President of Scarab fraternity, an architectural organization.

== Personal life ==
He was married to Jacqueline (Hughes) Langdon. They had a son, Robert Langdon, III, and a daughter, Jan (Langdon) Handtmann. They resided in Pasadena, California.

== Death ==
He died on August 13, 2004, in Pasadena, California. He was 86 years old.
