= Mondongo (collective) =

Argentine art collective

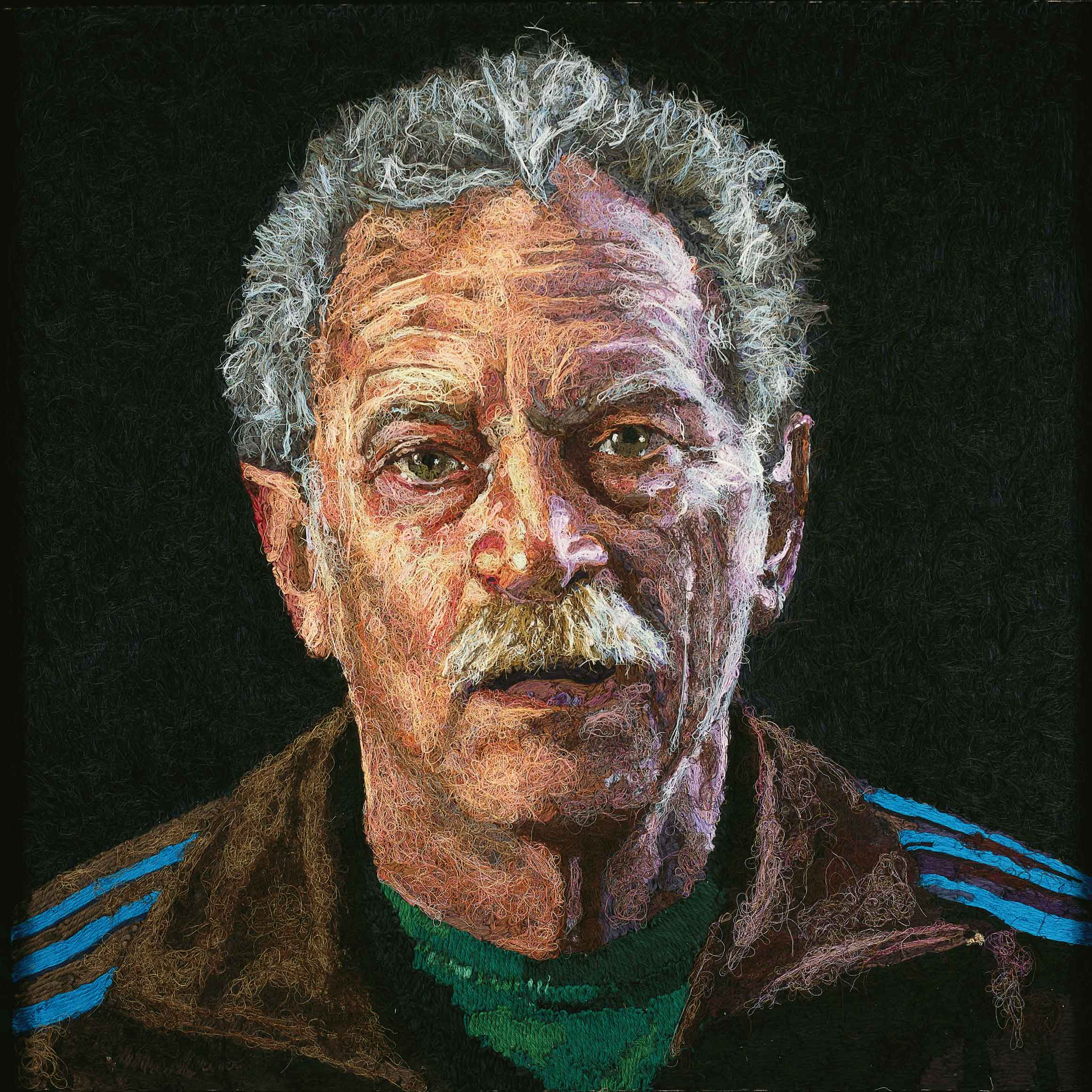
Portrait of Rodolfo Enrique Fogwill in cotton thread (2006) by Mondongo

Mondongo is an Argentine art collective founded in 1999 by three artists in Buenos Aires and named for the Latin American tripe stew, mondongo. They characteristically create realistic images with provocative content out of unusual materials.

== History ==
Juliana Lafitte, Manuel Mendanha and Agustina Picasso, all from Buenos Aires, formed Mondongo in 1999 after they met while studying art at the Escuela Nacional de Bellas Artes Prilidiano Pueyrredón. Picasso later left the group, which after some years as a duo subsequently expanded again: as of 2012 there were seven members. Lafitte and Mendanha have a daughter.

== Works ==
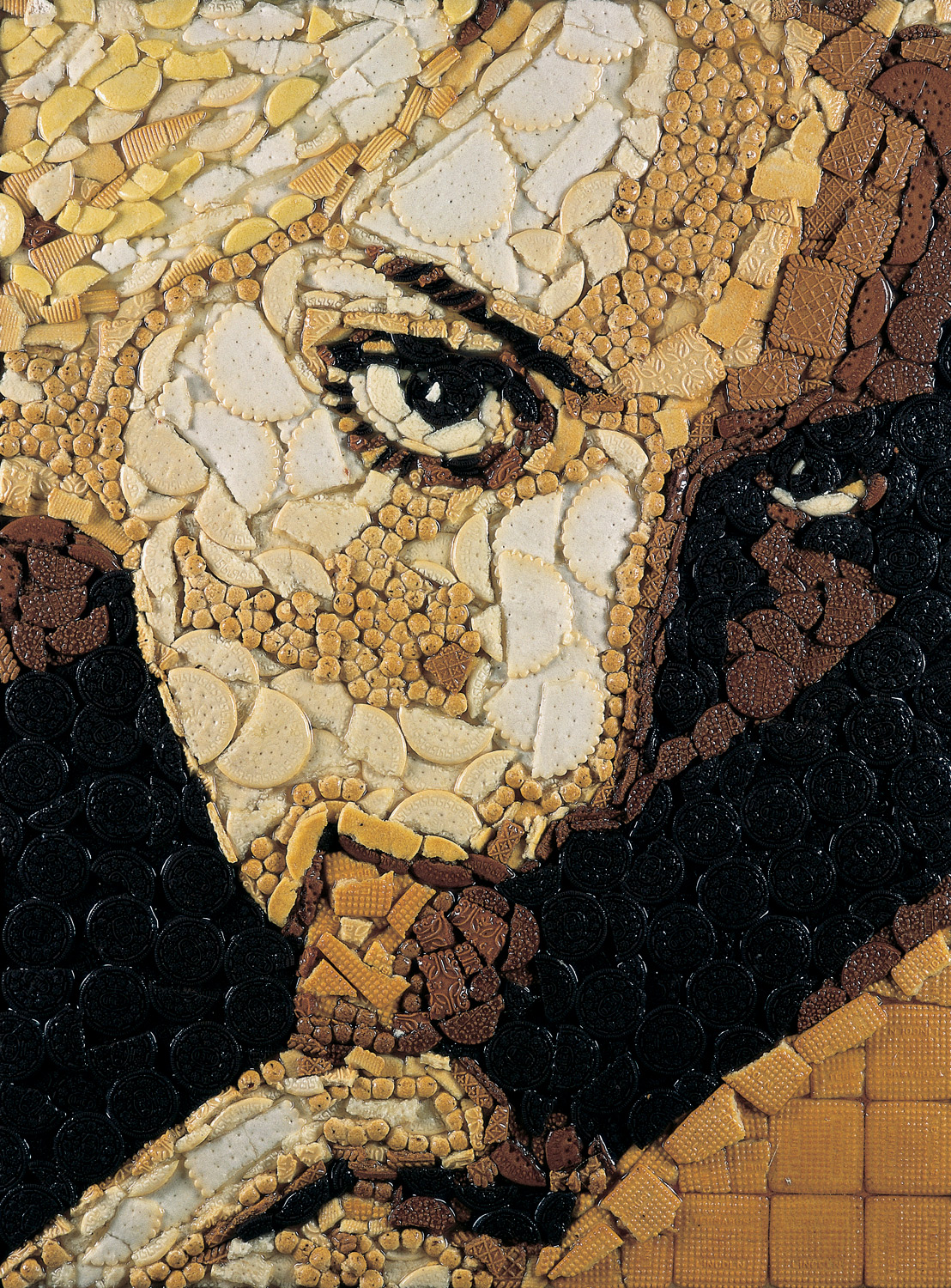
Blonde Teenie Sucking (2004), Black Series 12, biscuits on wood

Mondongo have been called "always provocative" and "perhaps the most disturbing art collective in Argentina and the region." At one point their manifesto described them as "three witches stirring it up in a cauldron ... attempting to alchemize, to distil and to ooze all of the 'all-ness' of it all." Their intention, reminiscent of Pop Art, is to produce work of high artistic quality that can be appreciated equally by "all strata [of society] ... the neighbour or a museum director". They work collectively, discussing an idea extensively until they know how to realise it; often they do not recall who originated it. Originally painters in oils and acrylics, as a collective they characteristically express their critiques of society and culture through the choice of particular unusual material as well as the image itself. Their first exhibition, La primera cena (the first supper) at the Centro Cultural Recoleta, consisted of death masks of still living people. For Cumbre, a series of portraits of "people who have been in some way at the pinnacle of one of their activities", they used 22,500 squares of glass and pigments containing mica to portray King Juan Carlos I of Spain, his Queen Sofía and their son King Felipe VI as a commentary on "identity and royal power", Plasticine for Walt Disney and glitter make-up for David Bowie.

The portraits of the Spanish royal family were commissioned by them—the first such commission by the Spanish court since the days of Diego Velázquez—and led to the group's becoming well known.

After the Disney portrait, Plasticine became a favourite medium of the group, for its combination of painting and of sculptural relief. They used it for a series of imaginary landscapes inspired by a visit to Entre Ríos, for landscape collages peopled by cavorting topless women with snarling cat heads, for a series on "Little Red Riding Hood" based on the darker Perrault version of the story and also for a series of twelve skulls whose surfaces are covered with scenes and people, thematic portraits of figures such as Jorge Luis Borges and topics such as money; these are intended as "a representation of the history of humanity in which the myths of present and past history, the myths of children's fairytales and the myths of consumer society with its social divisions [all] coexist." They have also used dripped and moulded Plasticine for portraits.

Other media they have used for portraits include cotton thread for a series including Rodolfo Enrique Fogwill, pearls for María Amalia Lacroze de Fortabat, matches for the gallery owner Ruth Benzacar, dried meat for Lucian Freud, burnt toast, stale bread and resin for Eva Perón, gold chains wrapped around nails for Diego Maradona and bullets and red resin for Che Guevara. Non-portrait subjects include a U.S. dollar note created with 80,000 nails, silver thread and resin on black wood, a lotus flower rendered in 300,000 hand-painted Chinese sticks and a depiction of childbirth as a mosaic of glass squares. They frequently use edibles, such as smoked ham, salmon and cheese, freeze-dried and sealed in resin. For the Black Series, they transformed pornographic images from the internet into mosaics of cookies and crackers in shades of brown and black; the monochromy and the use of common foodstuffs are a commentary on the de-eroticisation of sex and its pervasive commodification. In 2012 they showed a triptych reminiscent of Catholic altarpieces, but depicting a favela.

== Exhibitions ==
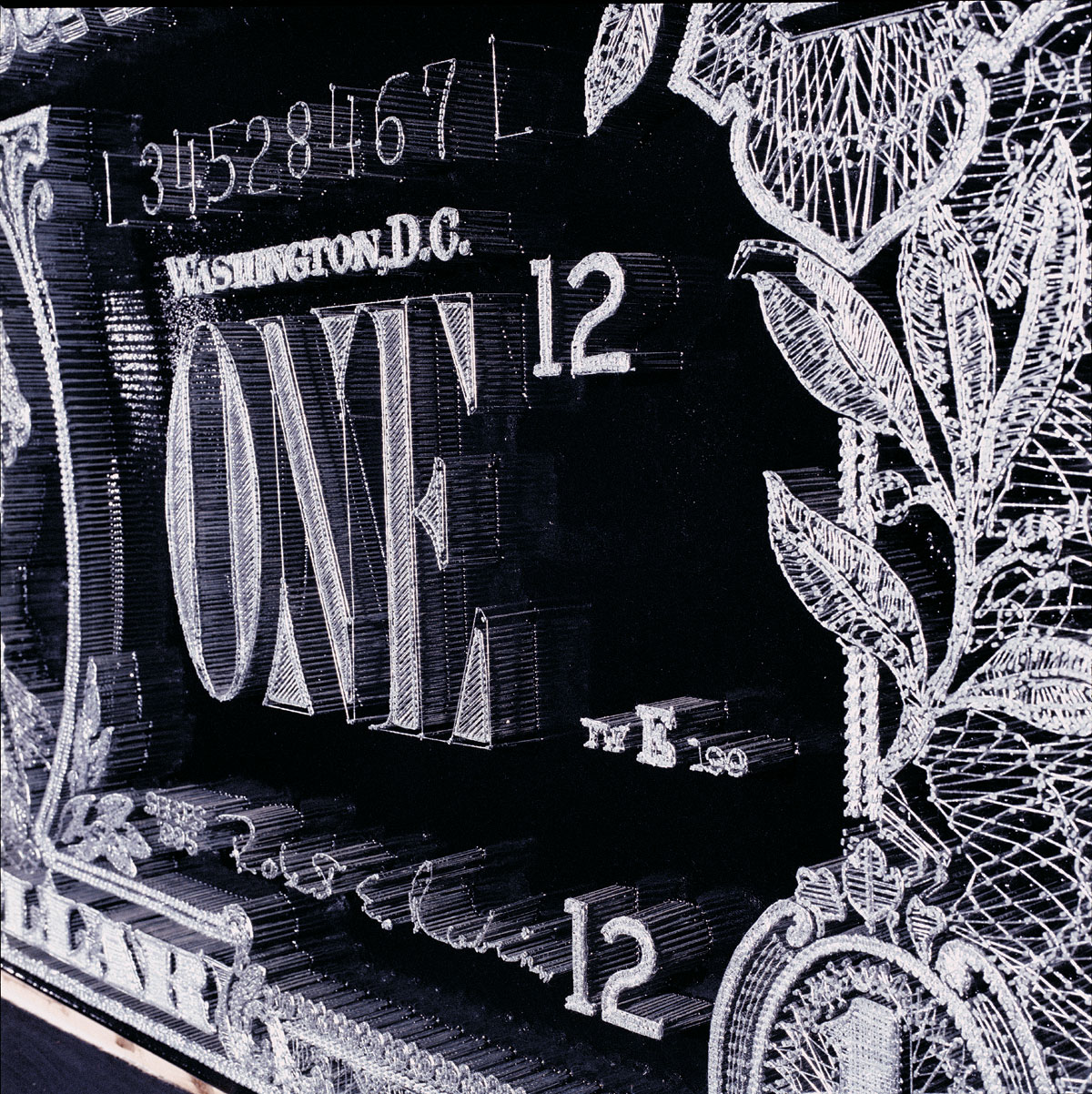
Detail, Dollar Bill (2006), nails, silver thread and resin on black wood

- 2000: La primera Cena, Centro Cultural Recoleta, Buenos Aires, Argentina
- 2002: Portraits, Gallery Braga Menéndez, Buenos Aires, Argentina
- 2004: Cumbre, Casa de América, Madrid, Spain
- 2004: La boca del lobo, Gallery Maman, Buenos Aires, Argentina
- 2005: From B.A. to L.A. (with other Argentinian artists), Track 16 Gallery, Santa Monica, California, US
- 2005: Merca, Gallery Ruth Benzacar, Buenos Aires, Argentina
- 2007: thread/bare, Track 16 Gallery, Los Angeles, US
- 2008: "Gaslighting", Track 16 Gallery, Santa Monica, Calif
- 2009: Silencio, Gallery Ruth Benzacar, Buenos Aires, Argentina
- 2009: Maddox Arts, London, England
- 2012: Art Sawa, Dubai International Financial Centre, United Arab Emirates
- 2013: Argentina, Buenos Aires Museum of Modern Art, Argentina
- 2016: Paisajes, MAXXI, Rome, Italy
- 2018: "What Are We Gonna Say After HELLO?", Track 16 Gallery, Los Angeles, Calif.
