= Emily Selinger =

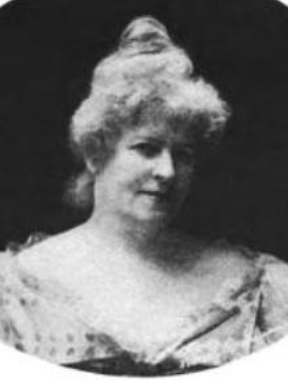
- Emily Selinger, from a 1927 publication
- Born: Emily Harris McGary; February 22, 1848; Wilmington, North Carolina, U.S.
- Died: July 16, 1927 (aged 79); Providence, Rhode Island, U.S.
- Education: Cooper Institute School of Design
- Occupations: painter; writer; poet; educator
- Spouse: Jean Paul Selinger (m. 1882; died 1909)
- Writing career
- Language: English
- Genres: travel writing, poetry

Emily Selinger (née, McGary; February 22, 1848 – July 16, 1927) was an American painter, author, poet, and educator from North Carolina. Known primarily for her still life and floral paintings, she gained particular recognition for her depictions of roses and exhibited her work at major venues including the Academy of Design in New York City, the Boston Art Club, and the Pennsylvania Academy of the Fine Arts. In addition to her artistic career, she was active as a teacher in the South and later maintained studios in Rhode Island, and in New Hampshire. Selinger published poetry, travel writing, and essays, and was a member of the New England Woman's Press Association. She traveled and studied extensively in Europe during the 1880s, after which she settled in Boston, Massachusetts where she continued to paint and write.

== Early life and education ==
Emily Harris McGary (Note: Marquis (1909) records Emily's middle name as Washington.) was born in Wilmington, North Carolina, February 22, 1848. (Note: Willard & Livermore (1893) record Emily's year of birth as 1854.)

Her parents were James and Elizabeth Otis Paine (Keller) McGary. She was a descendant on her father's side of Flora McDonald. Her father, a planter, amassed a fortune in the East India trade. He died just before the American Civil War, and his family were stripped of the large fortune left them through the mismanagement of a relative and by the war. The mother took her three young daughters to Providence, Rhode Island, to educate them. Selinger was a precocious child, showing aptitude for anything in the line of music, art and language. She finished the high school course in Providence, studied with private tutors, and ended with a course in the Cooper Institute School of Design in New York City. With art, she studied medicine, but decided not to attempt to practice in that field.

== Career ==
At the age of nineteen, she taught in southern schools, acting as instructor in painting, drawing, elocution, botany, French and Latin for seven years in various institutions. While teaching in Louisville, Kentucky, she read a paper on "Art Education" before a gathering of five-hundred teachers, which resulted in the establishment of a normal art-school in that city, of which she was principal. Ill-health compelled her to go north, and she returned to Providence, where she opened a studio.

In Providence, on October 9, 1882, she married Jean Paul Selinger (1850–1909), the artist. From 1882 to 1885, they traveled in Europe, studying in Italy, and while abroad Mrs. Selinger corresponded for the Boston Transcript.

She became a student of flower-painting, and earned the title "Emily Selinger, the Rose Painter." Returning to the United States, Mr. and Mrs. Selinger settled in Boston, Massachusetts. Her work was popular, and her rose pictures were found in notable collection in the U.S. She was also a successful author.

She was a member of the New England Woman's Press Association, as well as an honorary artist member of the Professional Woman's Club. She had summer studios in New Hampshire; from the mid 1880s, at Glen House, and from 1894, at Crawford House.

Selinger exhibited at the Academy of Design (New York), Boston Art Club, and the Pennsylvania Academy of Fine Arts.

== Awards and honors ==
Selinger was awarded the silver medal twice at the Mechanics' Association exhibits, and first prizes at several state fairs.

== Personal life ==
Selinger was Roman Catholic by religion.

Emily McGary Selinger died in Providence, Rhode Island, July 16, 1927. Her papers, as well as those of her husband, are held at the Archives of American Art.

== Paintings ==
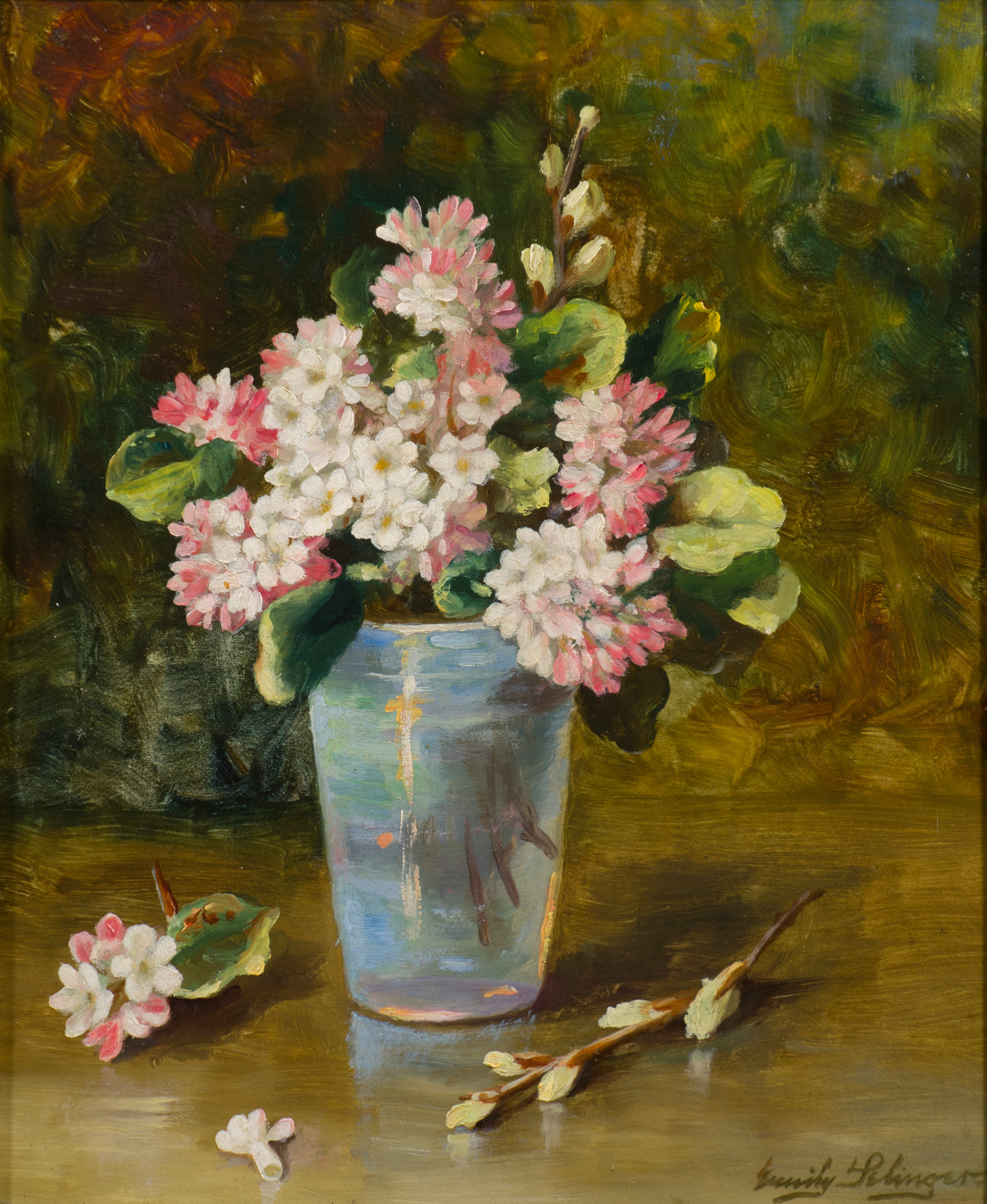
Trailing Arbutus and Pussy Willow in Opalescent Vase

- A trailing arbutus greeting
- A flower for happiness
- Oh! I found so many beautiful things
- Four-leaved clover
- Over the garden wall

== Publications ==
- Over the garden wall
- Oh! I found so many beautiful things
- Chromatics, 1915
- "A prayer for peace sent out to the world by the New England Women's Press Association", 1915

== Lyrics ==
- "Two roses" (music by Hallett Gilberté; arranged by Louis Victor Saar)
