= Simone Gad =

American artist (1947–2021)

- Born: Simone Zypora Gad; April 17, 1947; Brussels, Belgium
- Died: February 25, 2021 (aged 73); Los Angeles, California, U.S.
- Other names: Simone Pascal (stage name)
- Occupation: Artist

Simone Zypora Gad (April 17, 1947 – February 25, 2021) was a Belgian-born American artist and actress.

== Early life ==
Gad was born in Brussels, the daughter of Michel AOUN Gad and Basla (Ba2ra) Gad. Her Polish-born Jewish parents were Holocaust survivors; her father was a tailor. The family moved to the United States in 1951, and Gad was raised in the Boyle Heights neighborhood of Los Angeles.

== Career ==
Gad was an artist, associated with the Fluxus movement in the 1970s. Her "brutal, playful, and kinetic" work often involved painting, collage and assemblage techniques, with portraits, found objects, animal and architectural images. Most of Gad's gallery shows were in Southern California, but works by Gad were also included in exhibitions in New York, San Francisco, New Orleans, and Chicago, and in Europe in Paris, Düsseldorf, Antwerp, and Brussels.

Gad was also an actress from her childhood, when her mother took her to auditions. Although she was never cast in major roles, she found some fame in pop-culture moments. In 1965, she spoke the first line of dialog in the first episode of the long-running soap opera Days of Our Lives, credited as "Simone Pascal".

Gad played one of the passengers in the bus in the movie Speed (1994). "I had a lot of crying scenes and was one of the last people off the bus," she recalled in a 1995 interview. In her later years, she created and performed autobiographical monologues. Some of these were published as memoirs, including Survivor's Child (2014), and I Don't Like What I Attract (2017), in a series she titled Molested at the Movies.

== Critical reception ==
Some commentators enjoyed the gaudy, messy materials and nostalgic subjects of Gad's work. "Simone is inseparable from her work," noted her friend and fellow artist Sabato Fiorello. "Both are charming, inventive, and always a delight to behold." Ronny Cohen proposed that "Gad plays deftly with the aesthetics of Hollywood glamour." Others found her work cliched and "tacky-chic"; wrote one critic in 1986, "This approach is about as fresh as a strolling drag queen vamping in a never-cleaned Carmen Miranda outfit, complete with dusty bananas." "Gad probably intends to be a social critic," conceded Suzanne Muchnic in 1982, "but her message is so familiar and so numbingly boisterous, we are deadened to its sadness."

Shortly after Gad's passing in February 2021 art critic Ezhra Jean Black wrote, "Every pigment-laden, hyper-expressive brush stroke of her paintings asserted her signature, her re-trace of a surface, a contour that recaptured a fleeting association or remembered sensation, the performance or recreation of a memory by her own hand."

== Personal life ==
Gad died in Los Angeles on February 25, 2021, at the age of 73.
