= Lawrence M. Salinger =

American criminologist and sociologist

Lawrence M. Salinger (January 7, 1958 in Bono — November 23, 2013 in Jonesboro) was a professor of criminology and sociology at Arkansas State University. His research interests in criminology focused on violent victimization and organizational crime.

== Encyclopedia of White Collar and Corporate Crime ==
Salinger is well known for being the editor of the Encyclopedia of White-Collar & Corporate Crime, a two-volume work with over 500 entries on white collar and corporate crime. It gathers history, definitions, examples, investigation, prosecution, assessments, challenges, and projections into one reference work on the topic.

Among the key themes of the book are:

- Financial & Securities fraud
- Medical & Healthcare fraud
- Political scandals
- Environmental crime (pollution, etc.)
- War-profiteering
