= Galia Linn =

Israeli-American artist (born 1963)

Galia Linn (born November 15, 1963) is an Israeli-American sculptor, painter, and installation artist based in Los Angeles. Her work has been featured in LA Weekly, KCET Artbound, Art + Cake, and KCRW’s Art Talk and addressed themes including memory, vulnerability, mortality, archaeology, and sanctuary. She has exhibited at Athenaeum Music & Arts Library and Lancaster Museum of Art and History.

== Early life and education ==
Linn was born and raised in Tel Aviv, Israel. She served two years in the Israeli Air Force. In 1991, while working at a summer camp in Houston, Texas, she visited the Houston Museum of Art and encountered a painting by Georgia O'Keeffe, an experience she later identified as influential in her decision to pursue art. She had previously studied architecture at the Neri Bloomfield College of Design and Architecture in Haifa and subsequently worked in architecture and design.

After moving to Los Angeles, Linn returned to working with clay. She initially produced functional pottery before developing larger ceramic sculptures and installations. She also studied metal and sculpture at Otis College of Art and Design. Her practice subsequently expanded to include metal, wood, paint, plaster, and other materials.

== Art career ==
Linn's sculptures frequently use the vessel as a central form. Her work has been described in terms of contrasts between strength and fragility, while cracks, fissures, and exposed structures form recurring elements. Her interest in archaeology and ancient civilizations, particularly Çatalhöyük, has informed several bodies of work.

Her solo exhibitions have included Inside at the Athenaeum Music & Arts Library in La Jolla, Evidence of Care at Track 16 Gallery in Los Angeles in 2019, Beauty Queen, Heartbreaker, High Maintenance at Track 16 in 2021, and Mai 49—Watercolors at Hamzianpour & Kia in 2023. The latter series was based on photographs of sites affected by the 1947–49 Palestine war and explored memory and inherited trauma.

In 2024, the Lancaster Museum of Art and History presented Vessels and Guardians, a 20-year survey of Linn's work comprising approximately 60 pieces. The exhibition brought together sculpture, painting, and installation from different periods of her career.

In 2016, Linn founded Blue Roof Studios, a multidisciplinary art space in South Los Angeles housed in a former church. The facility includes artist studios and spaces for exhibitions, workshops, and community programs. In 2020, she founded Arts at Blue Roof, a nonprofit organization that provides studio residencies, mentorship, and public programs, including initiatives supporting women artists.
