= Heidi Zuckerman =

American museum director and curator

- Born: Heidi Ellen Zuckerman; 1967 or 1968 (age 57–58)
- Education: University of Pennsylvania (BA); CUNY Hunter College (MA)
- Occupations: Museum director and curator
- Employer: Orange County Museum of Art

Heidi Zuckerman (born 1967 or 1968) is an American museum director and curator who is CEO and director of the Orange County Museum of Art in Costa Mesa, California.

Zuckerman was previously a curator for the Jewish Museum in New York and the Berkeley Art Museum and Pacific Film Archive in California. From 2005 to 2019, she was director and chief curator of Aspen Art Museum in Colorado, during which the museum opened a new building designed by Shigeru Ban and shifted from exhibiting mainly local artists to international contemporary artists. She assumed her current position at the Orange County Museum of Art in 2021, managing the construction of its new building.

== Early life and education ==
Heidi Ellen Zuckerman was born in 1967 or 1968. Zuckerman's mother, Helen, lived in Huntington, New York, and her father Matthew was from Palo Alto, California; she first lived in New York and grew up in Palo Alto. Her interest in art started in her childhood. In an interview with Cultured magazine, she recalled that her grandmother would send extra artwork she collected to her parents, who were not interested in art, so she "grew up making up my own stories about the objects that we lived with." She would visit art museums on trips to San Francisco.

Zuckerman attended the University of Pennsylvania, where she earned a Bachelor of Arts in European history in 1989. Her undergraduate thesis focused on the history of the punk subculture in the United Kingdom. She recalls she "fell in love" with art during her sophomore year, at a gallery show in Philadelphia, when she "became so immersed in what I was looking at that I forgot my current romantic challenges". After university, she studied for one year at the auction house Christie's, in London, and then lived in New York and worked at an art gallery in SoHo, Manhattan.

== Curatorial work ==
For five years until 1999, Zuckerman was assistant curator of 20th-century art at the Jewish Museum in New York, during which she created the museum's Contemporary Artists Projects series that showcased commissioned artwork in the museum and on its website. A 1996 exhibition by Zuckerman at the museum examined Louis Kahn's four designs for synagogues, of which only the Temple Beth-El in Chappaqua, New York, has been built. The New York Times architecture critic Paul Goldberger found the exhibition "full of heartbreak, for there is no way to walk through these galleries and not be filled with a sense of lost opportunity." She also worked as an independent curator during this time to remain affiliated with the downtown art scene of New York City. Other work included an exhibition covering the art of George Segal; an exhibition during Hanukkah that featured light and video sculptures; and an independently organized exhibition at Art&Idea, in Mexico City, that covered the use of the body of the artist in video art since the 1970s. In 1997, she earned a Master of Arts in art history from CUNY Hunter College, with a thesis on the artist's nude body in video.

In 1998, Zuckerman was named a curator at the Berkeley Art Museum and Pacific Film Archive (BAMPFA) in California. She was appointed by the museum to head its MATRIX program, founded in 1978 for the purpose of showcasing new works of artists as soon as they were created. At BAMPFA for more than six years, she organized more than forty solo exhibitions of contemporary artists. She was also a faculty member in the California College of the Arts' master's degree program in curatorial practice.

== Administrative positions ==
=== Aspen Art Museum (2005–2019) ===
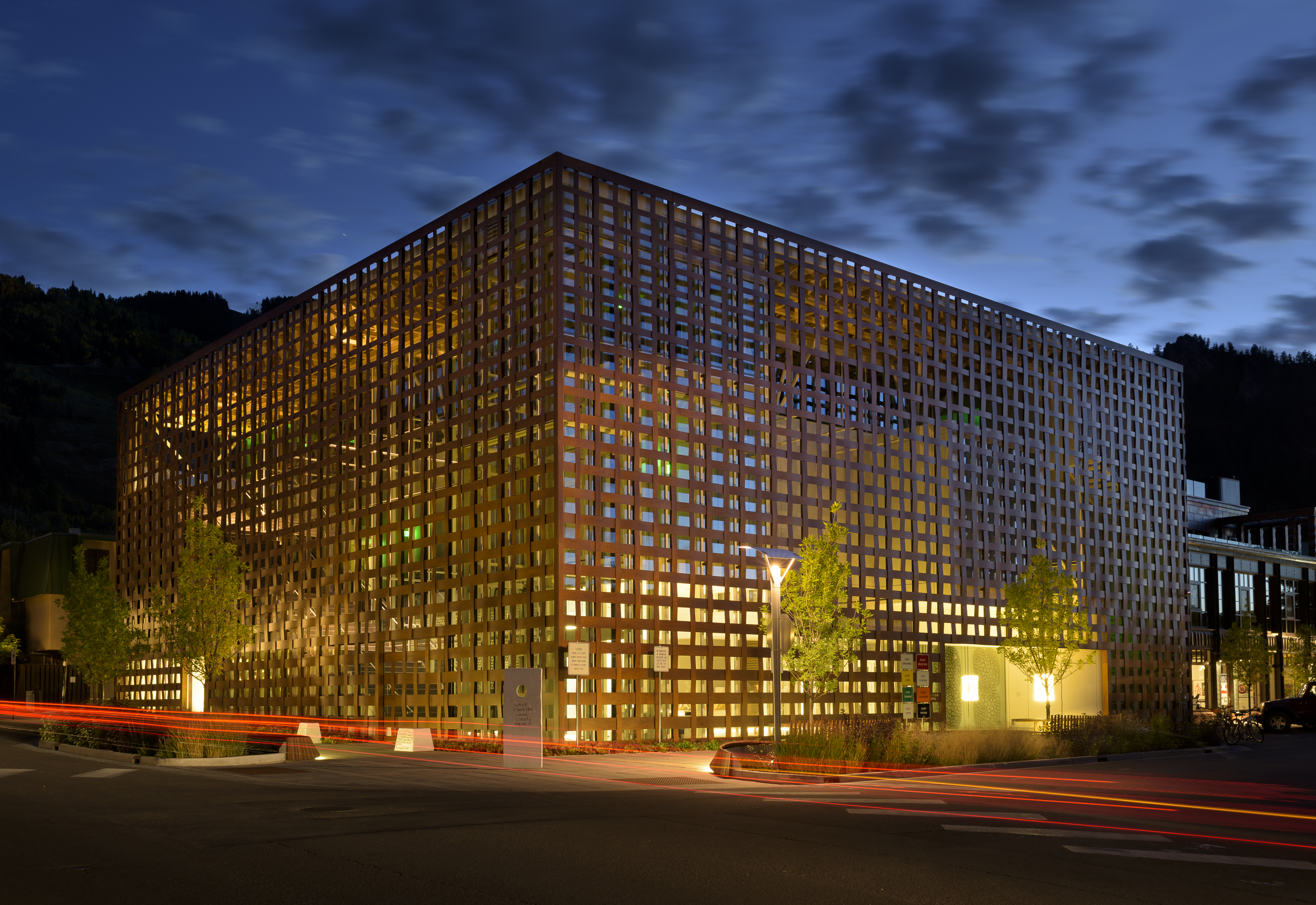
Zuckerman was director of the Aspen Art Museum from 2005 to 2019.

Zuckerman became director and chief curator of the Aspen Art Museum of Aspen, Colorado in 2005, succeeding Dean Sobel. In 2009, she became the second director of a Colorado museum to join the Association of Art Museum Directors. Under Zuckerman's tenure, the museum experienced "unprecedented" growth in funding and attendance, as noted by The Aspen Times, and a shift of museum programming from local art to international contemporary art by artists such as Yto Barrada, Vik Muniz, Ernesto Neto, Amy Sillman, and Danh Võ. She oversaw the construction of the museum's new building designed by Shigeru Ban and opened in 2014. The new building and the shift in programming reportedly drew "mixed local reception", as they conflicted with some Aspen residents who felt that the museum was out of touch with local interests. Ray Mark Rinaldi of The Denver Post wrote upon the opening that the museum's recent changes reflected "the identity crisis Aspen has suffered for years" as it had turned into "a ski getaway for movie stars and a vacation destination for outsiders".

Among other exhibitions at the museum, Zuckerman most recently organized exhibitions on Cheryl Donegan (2018), Rashid Johnson, and John Armleder (both 2019). She left her position at the museum in 2019, but said she would provide consulting services on four of the museum's exhibitions through May 2020. After leaving the museum, she launched the website HiZ.art to serve as a platform for personal projects, including a podcast series and book series.

=== Orange County Museum of Art (2021–present) ===
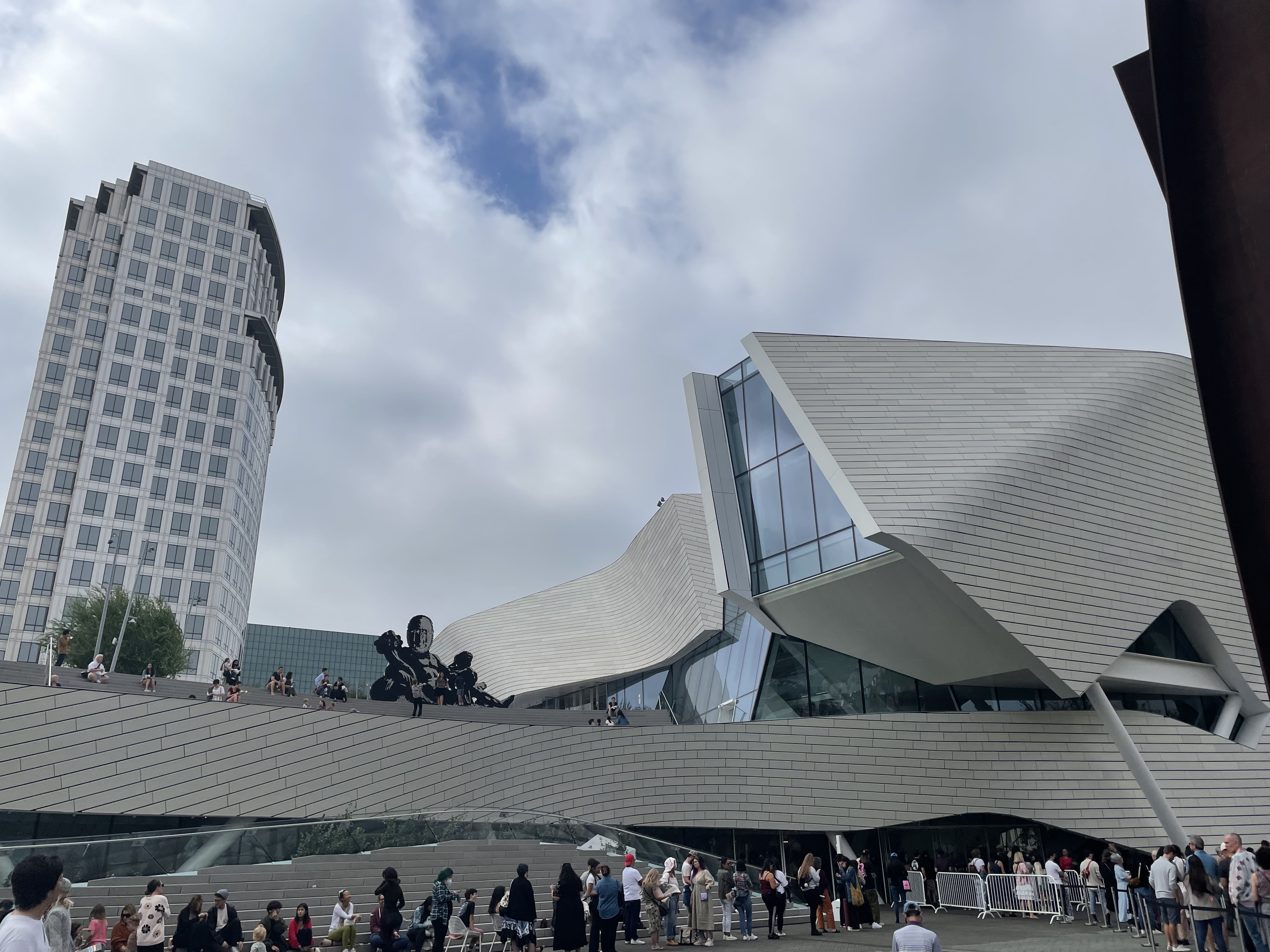
The Orange County Museum of Art opened its new location in Costa Mesa, California, in 2022.

In 2021, Zuckerman became CEO and director of the Orange County Museum of Art in California, succeeding Todd Smith. She oversaw the construction of a $93 million building located at the Segerstrom Center for the Arts in Costa Mesa, California; the museum had used a temporary location after its Newport Beach building closed in 2018. In early 2022, the museum announced the selection of Courtenay Finn as chief curator and Meagan Burger as director of learning and engagement, both former colleagues of Zuckerman from the Aspen Art Museum, and an acquisitions initiative aiming to acquire 60 works of art for the occasions of the museum's 60th anniversary and the opening of its new building.

The museum's new location was opened in October 2022, with admission announced to be free of charge for the first decade as a result of a donation. Under her tenure, the museum acquired works by Andrea Bowers, Joan Brown, and Derek Fordjour, and held exhibitions on Yves Saint Laurent and Fred Eversley, among others. The museum's self reported statistics of more than 500,000 annual visitors, twelve times greater than those of the previous location. She is set to leave her position at the museum at the end of 2025 to work on her company, HZ Inc.

== Personal life ==
While living in New York, in 1997, Zuckerman married Christopher Jacobson, who worked as a builder. Jacobson and Zuckerman opened an exhibition and performance space in New York City's Lower East Side named Correct CE. The couple moved to Aspen, Colorado, and in 2012, Jacobson was elected a member of the Snowmass Village Town Council. They later divorced. She married again in 2024.

Zuckerman purchased a property in Laguna Beach, California, ahead of joining the Orange County Museum of Art in 2021.
