= Jean Paul Selinger =

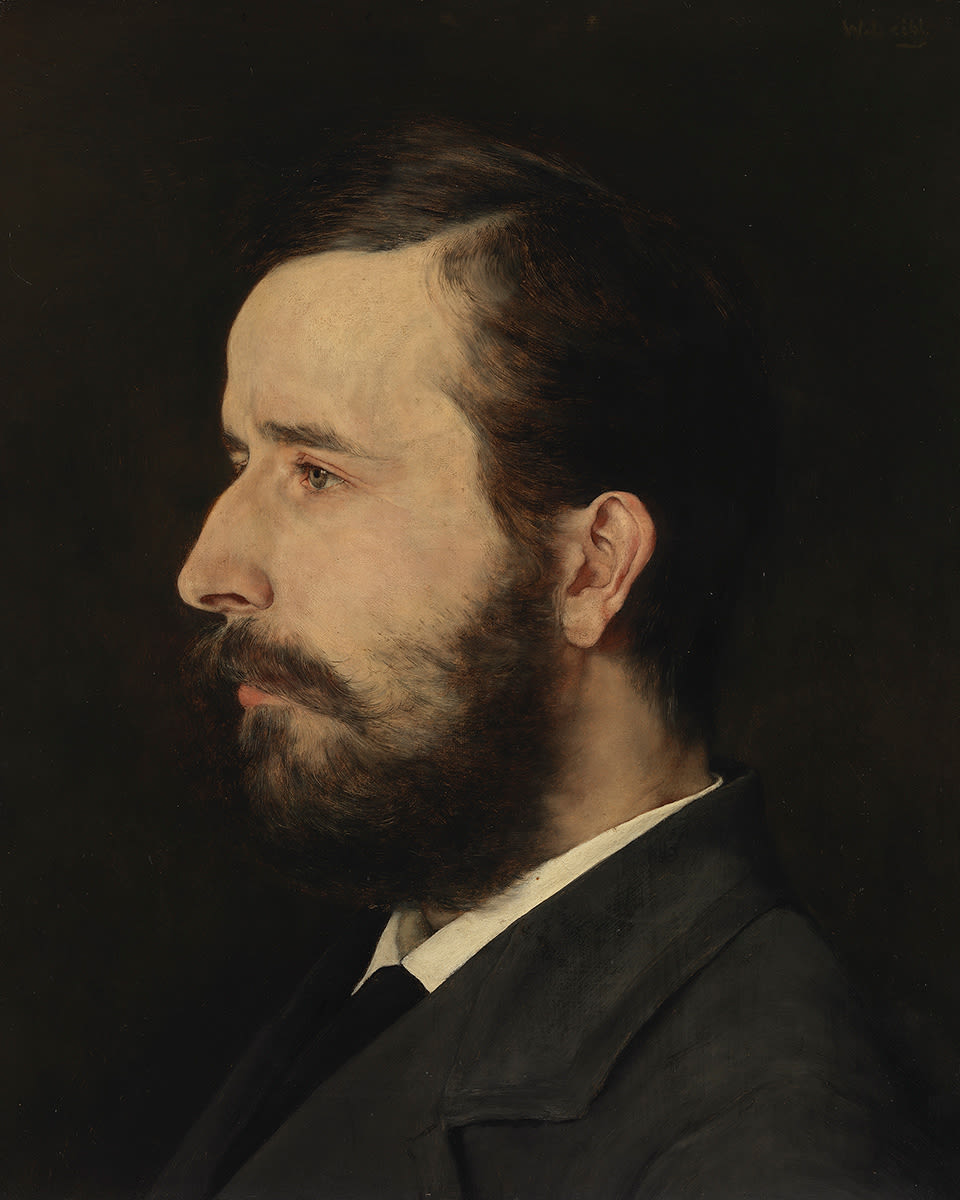
- Portrait of Jean Paul Selinger by Wilhelm Leibl (circa 1880)
- Born: June 24, 1850; Boston, Massachusetts, U.S.
- Died: September 11, 1909 (aged 59)
- Occupation: Painter
- Spouse: Emily McGary (m. 1882–1885)

Jean Paul Selinger (June 24, 1850 – September 11, 1909) was an American painter associated with the White Mountain art movement. Born in Boston, Massachusetts, he later trained in Germany before establishing a studio in Providence, Rhode Island. Selinger also maintained summer studios in New Hampshire, where he produced landscape paintings of the White Mountains.

Selinger married Emily McGary in 1882. The couple separated in 1885.

In recognition of his contributions to American art, Selinger was inducted into the Rhode Island Heritage Hall of Fame in 2011.

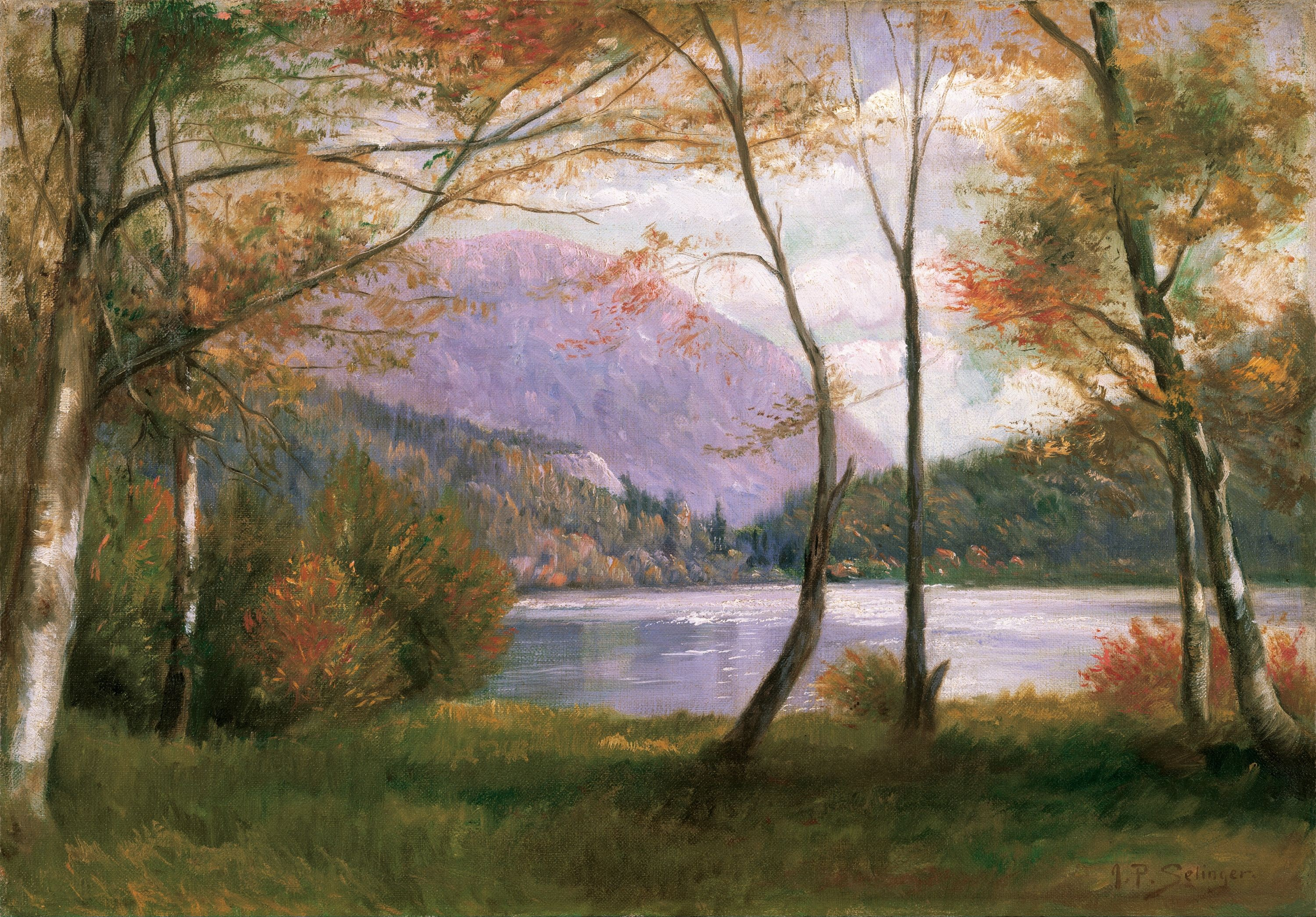
Gateway of Crawford Notch, White Mountains by Selinger
