= Johannes Saliger =

Johannes Saliger (also identified as John Saliger, Johannes Seliger or Johann Beatus) was a sixteenth century radical Lutheran theologian and controversialist. He was a leading protagonist in "the Saliger Controversy" which bears his name.

== Life ==
Johannes Saliger is believed to have been born in Lübeck. It is likely that he was the son, or possibly a remoter relative, of Johann Salige, a businessman and civic leader of Lübeck who died in 1530. He first appears in the records as a Lutheran preacher based in Woerden, a prosperous small town a short distance to the west of Utrecht. By 1566 he had moved on to become a preacher to the Protestant community at Antwerp.

Two years later he became passionately involved in a controversy about Original sin which enforced his departure from Antwerp. He then returned to Lübeck where he was appointed a deacon at St. Mary's Church. However, almost immediately, on 4 July 1568, he was removed from that post. He had become involved in another passionately conducted dispute. Together with Hinrich Fredeland, who preached at St. James's Church, he launched what might be construed as an intensification of the Lutheran doctrine of the Real Presence. Martin Luther had uncompromisingly rejected the Roman Catholic doctrine of Transubstantiation, but had replaced it with the idea that Christ is nevertheless substantially present in the physical elements (bread and wine) of the Eucharist. The Real Presence doctrine evidently invited further interpretation. The point at issue in the Saliger Controversy concerned the moment when Christ becomes present in the Eucharist. Saliger contended "that the true body and the true blood of the Lord Christ is present in the Supper already before the use, distribution and reception". Luther himself was on record as having believed that the timing of Christ's appearance in the bread and the wine was not an important question. But for Saliger it really mattered. Fellow ministers seeking to reason with him found him unbending. Wir haben noch niemals einen so sfeiften-Kopf gefunden ('We have never before come across such a thick skull'). Those who did not share his view he condemned as Philippists or Melanchthonians. Martin Chemnitz was called in to mediate, but without success.

Saliger now became a preacher at St. Mary's Church, Rostock, where he agreed to avoid confrontation. But the dispute broke out afresh. For many purposes the controversy was resolved with the 1569 Mecklenburger Edict, which may have been drafted by David Chytraeus. From Saliger's perspective, however, the Mecklenburger Edict fudged important issues. On 5 October 1569 he received (and refused to accept) notification of his departure. A group of his adherents, known as the Beatiner remained at Rostock till the end of the sixteenth century. By 1571 Saliger was himself living at Wismar. There are indications that in the next few years he turned up in Hamburg and, again, in Lübeck. In 1577 he was back in what was in the process of becoming the Netherlands, where he disappears from surviving records.

== Aftermath and evaluation ==
The Saliger Controversy resurfaced in Lübeck in 1574, although this time Saliger himself was not involved. Instead it was his friend, the city physician (and brother to his old ally Hinrich Fredeland) Lambert Fredeland who took the lead. It is a mark of the seriousness with which the church authorities viewed the matter that this time both Lucas Bacmeister and Martin Chemnitz were called in for advice. At the end of June a compromise was reached in a negotiation held at St. Catherine's Church which had the practical effect of requiring the ministers to the practice of reconsecration of the bread and wine.

The Saliger Controversy needs to be seen as one of a whole series of theological disputes, principally between Gnesio-Lutherans and Philippists during the years between the death, in 1546, of Martin Luther and the widespread acceptance of the Book of Concord in 1580. Other disputes included the Adiaphoristic Controversy and the Osiandric Controversy and led up to the so-called Confessionalization process.

Traces of the Saliger Controversy can still be detected in the chapter on consecration of the Eucharist that appears in the 1577 Formula of Concord, which in general terms accepted the main conclusions of the earlier Magdeburg and Rostock agreements as the generally accepted Lutheran position. However, despite referencing the issues to which he had drawn attention, the Formula of Concord avoided mentioning Saliger by name, and may indeed have been intending to reference him when they wrote, "We reject and condemn also all presumptuous, frivolous, blasphemous questions and expressions which are presented in a gross, carnal, Capernaitic way regarding the supernatural, heavenly mysteries of this Supper. Other and additional antitheses, or rejected contrary doctrines, have been reproved and rejected in the preceding explanation, which, for the sake of brevity, we will not repeat here ...".

The issues that Johannes Saliger raised never disappeared completely. In 1971 Tom Hardt, a Swedish theologian and pastor, included in his doctoral dissertation the contention that Saliger was "doctrinally correct" in terms of the mainstream beliefs of Lutherans in the first part of the sixteenth century.
