= Sponsored Content (album) =

Studio album by Antwood
- Released: September 8, 2017
- Genre: Electronica; experimental; IDM
- Length: 42:21
- Label: Planet Mu
- Producer: Antwood

Antwood chronology
Virtuous.scr (2016)	Sponsored Content (2017)

Singles from Sponsored Content
- 1. "Wait for Yengi" Released: July 10, 2017

Sponsored Content is the second studio album of Canadian producer Tristan Douglas, known by his stage name as Antwood. Released on September 8, 2017 by the label Planet Mu, Sponsored Content is about "subversive advertising" and how commonplace it is in the media, and references to advertising slogans and companies pop up at random to make the listener aware he is being advertised. The album also has more content based on Douglas' personal experiences than his previous Antwood album Virtuous.scr (2016). The album was critically well-received for how it handled dark subject matter humorously.

== Concept and composition ==
Douglas' initial plan for a second Antwood album was to approach a similar set of electronic sounds with "different soundscapes, much like opening different corridors," hence why he originally planned to name it Corridors However, that changed when Douglas subscribed to a popular ASMR channel on YouTube in 2016. He noticed that the content was starting to become more focused on lifestyle videos than actual ASMR content: "It started to affect my life, whereupon I started to sense this phoniness in a lot of it, especially the online content that I trusted and relied upon." The videos were using "quiet, subtle ads, woven into the content" which appalled him since the channel was "target[ing]" people "during times of semi lucid vulnerability."

This inspired him to create a concept album regarding "subversive" advertising and how its nearly everywhere in the media, and thus the album name changed from Corridors to Sponsored Content. Some critics have described the album as a meta-humorous take on the concept. Sponsored Content opens with "Disable Ad Blocker," which deals with websites that force users to turn off their browsers' ad filtering feature in order to access them. "Fiji Water" depicts a water bottle distributor who uses "melodramatic" and "stilted" commercials to advertise their products. The song was based on Fiji Water's advertisements, which Douglas described as "ridiculous," "pretty lofty," and "sensational."

Sponsored Content also deals with "intentionally devaluing the things" of people, which was inspired by Douglas "peeking out from behind my self-imposed veil of heavy conceptualization" that was on his previous Antwood album Virtuous.scr (2016). Some of the songs were made while he was going through very "challenging" experiences: "The New Industry" is about the "physical stress reaction" Douglas dealt with while working at loud industrial places, and "Sublingual" is about a time when he drank Wiser's Deluxe and took eleven one-milligram sublingual Ativan pills to get through a performance in Montreal. Douglas explained that the title of the song "ICU" could either mean "I See You" or "Intensive Care Unit," but suggests it's "I See You" since it "sounds like the most horrific version of a FEMA camp routine surveillance check." He said that the tone of "The Hyper Individual" shifts between calm and chaotic to represent "two opposing extremes" in order to question if "a fully functional person [is] in a constant, steady state of duality" or "save[s] up "prudence points" and use[s] them to vindicate a chaotic, instinctual bender."

== Music and sounds ==
Sponsored Content is musically more melodic and less cluttered in structure than Virtuous.scr. As with Virtuous.scr, Douglas made Sponsored Content with freeware virtual instrument plug-ins, "all FM synthesis and ignorant synthesised stuff" as he put it. Equipment used on Sponsored Content includes the Ladyada x0xb0x synth on "The New Industry," Alter Ego, a freeware singing synthesizer, used on the album's closing track "Human," and a VHS player that performs a piano software synthesizer on "Human." Writer Luke Pearson noted that on songs like "Fiji Water," the album's digital textures "breath a surprisingly organic rhythm." A Medium compared sounds of both Sponsored Content and Virtuous.scr to other grime works like Desert Strike (2012) by Fatima Al Qadiri and Classical Curves (2012) by Jam City.

In fleshing out the album's advertising concept, samples of commercials are played at random to make the listener aware they're being advertised to, including whispers of the slogan "I'm Lovin It" and references to Mark Zuckerberg by a digital voice. Categorizing the album as a "glitchy update of The Who Sell Out or the first Sigue Sigue Sputnik album," journalist Paul Simpson described the album as "intense and overwhelming, juxtaposing rapid crashing and whirring noises with sudden, confusing passages of crystalline new age tones [...] then throwing in strange samples of tortured screams."

Sponsored Content also includes samples of a recording session of a cello performance by one of Douglas' friends. As Douglas recalled, "I composed the music, but the cello player I had on board was really out of practise, so I had to really rearrange what he did." "Wait For Yengi" features a finger-picked guitar melody performed by Douglas. "Disable Ad Blocker" includes a set of "memes" in its sound palette such as loud bass sounds, a sample of the PlayStation 2 start-up sound, samples of Rihanna's voice, and a "descending, sustained whammy bar note" from the "Eruption" guitar solo by Van Halen. To present the industrial theme, the Aphex Twin-inspired "The New Industry" contains samples of YouTube videos of malfunctioning equipment. "Fiji Water" also contains a sample of Mike Paradinas teasing the song in a December 2016 episode of Paradina's podcast Meemo & Mu.

== Release and promotion ==
"Wait for Yengi" was released as a single on July 10, 2017. On September 5, 2017, self-titled premiered a set of "early prototype" tracks made for Sponsored Content, which includes longer versions of songs from the album and rejected cuts. PopMatters premiered the actual final album via streaming on September 6 before Planet Mu officially issued it on physical and digital formats on September 8. The video for "Don't Go" was written, produced, and directed by Douglas and UNICORN, a Paris company whose artistic director Paulin Rogues also worked on the videos for several tracks from Virtuous.cr. It was released on September 18, 2017 and involves an androgynous robot walking through a "pristine, underground subway environment" with "ads shining on the tiled walls," Pearson wrote.

== Critical reception ==
Professional ratings
Review scores
Source	Rating
AllMusic	4/5 stars
Exclaim!	8/10
Medium	6/10
PopMatters	8/10 stars
Resident Advisor	3.6/5

Professional music journalists wrote favorable reviews of the album, some of them praising its comedic handling of otherwise dark subject matter. Reviewing the album for AllMusic, Simpson labeled Sponsored Content as "darkly humorous and somewhat scary," honoring it as a "fascinating commentary on the presence of advertising in our daily lives. Rather than ignoring it, Antwood embraces it, subverts it, and turns it into mind-blowing meta-art." AllMusic later put the LP on its list of "Favorite Electronic Albums" of 2017. An Exclaim! reviewer called the album an "intelligent and well-crafted piece of work," praising its handling of heavy topics without "being weighed down" by them and its "scary and pristine" sound design. Resident Advisor found the album "weirdly fascinating" but also opined it took its dark concept "a bit too easy," such as when it used it for meta-humor or "undermine[d] the power of the music."

== Track listing ==
Track lengths derived from Apple Music.

No.	Title	Length
1.	"Disable Ad Blocker"	4:18
2.	"The New Industry"	3:42
3.	"FIJI Water"	3:39
4.	"Wait for Yengi"	3:54
5.	"I'm Lovin' I.T."	2:46
6.	"Sublingual"	1:05
7.	"Icu"	4:02
8.	"The Hyper Individual"	4:35
9.	"Commodity Fetish Mode"	4:42
10.	"Derealization"	1:50
11.	"Don't Go"	3:21
12.	"Human"	4:27
Total length:		42:21

== Release history ==
Region	Date	Format(s)	Label
Worldwide	September 8, 2017	CD; digital download; vinyl	Planet Mu
