= Genre-Specific Xperience =

2011 album by Fatima Al Qadiri

EP by Fatima Al Qadiri
- Released: 25 October 2011
- Genre: Juke; hip hop; dubstep; electro-tropicália; Gregorian trance; world
- Length: 23:27
- Label: UNO
- Producer: Fatima Al Qadiri

Fatima Al Qadiri chronology
Warn-U (2011)	Genre-Specific Xperience (2011)	GSX Remixes (2012)

Genre-Specific Xperience is a project by Kuwait musician Fatima Al Qadiri that serves as her second extended play in her discography. Its intention is to reinterpret five musical genres through audio and visuals: juke, hip hop, dubstep, electronic tropicalia, and what the press release labeled as "‘90s Gregorian trance." The main idea of the project regards what would happen if the "limitations" of a genre were bypassed or altered. The visuals for the tracks were produced by Tabor Robak, Sophia Al-Maria, Ryan Trecartin, Rhett LaRue, Kamau Patton, and production company Thunder Horse. The music videos premiered at New Museum on 21 October 2011, and the extended play itself was released by UNO Records on 25 October to favorable reviews from professional music journalists. A remix record titled GSX Remixes was released in May 2012 and features re-edits of tracks from Genre-Specific Xperience by acts such as Ikonika and DJ Rashad.

== Concept and composition ==
"[For "Hip Hop Spa,"] I envisioned this soundtrack for a fantasy space; which is a luxury spa for black rappers. So it's a soundtrack for that. That's how the song came around. I conceptualised a space and made a soundtrack for it. Obviously it doesn't sound anything like hip hop. But the use of certain beats creates a kind of effect of hip hop, but it's not. For Instance, the song D-Medley is my impression of electro tropicalia. It's not electro tropicalia. So [Genre-Specific Xperience is] basically a very playful project but it's also trying to tie in the visual languages of music through the videos that were made for them. They're both impressions, they're both dealing with the idea of boundaries visually and audibly. What happens when you pass those boundaries, what do you get?"

— Qadiri in an interview with Dazed

The overall project of Genre-Specific Xperience intends to sonically and visually reinterpret five genres: juke house ("Corpcore"), hip hop ("Hip Hop Spa"), dubstep ("How Can I Resist U"), electronic tropicalia (“D-Medley”), and what the press release labeled as "‘90s Gregorian trance" (“Vatican Vibes”). Critic Shawn Reynaldo also noticed elements of 1990s new age music on the record. The tracks were produced with a MIDI controller and virtual instruments. In categorizing the overall style of the music, Carrie Battan of Pitchfork explained that it "harnesses the eerie mysticism of WARN-U [...] but channels it into a percussive, neo-global club sound driven by an unexpectedly sinister synthetic steel drum."

Qadiri viewed a genre as a set of certain "limitations" that make up music of a specific sound or style. Thus, she made the songs and visuals that commentated on what would happen if those limits were bypassed or changed. Kathleen Flood of The Creators Project stated that the music and visuals of Genre-Specific Xperience present the internet "as a multi-dimensional venue, underscoring the significance of working with found footage and how the act of collaborating and translating a theme or emotion through multiple mediums can resonate much deeper than streaming a SoundCloud track."

== Tracks and music videos ==
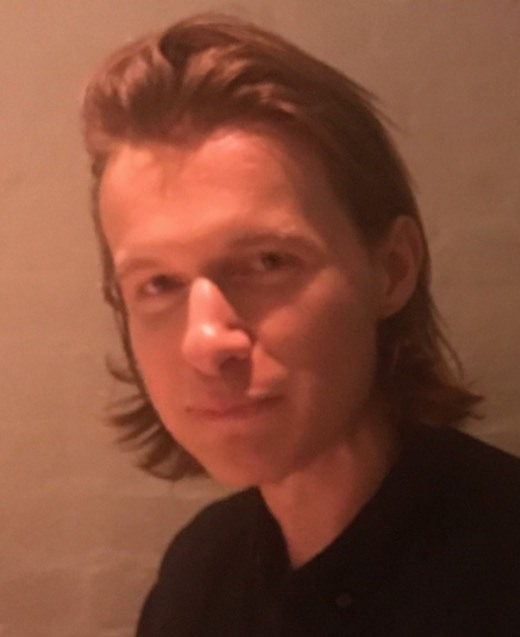
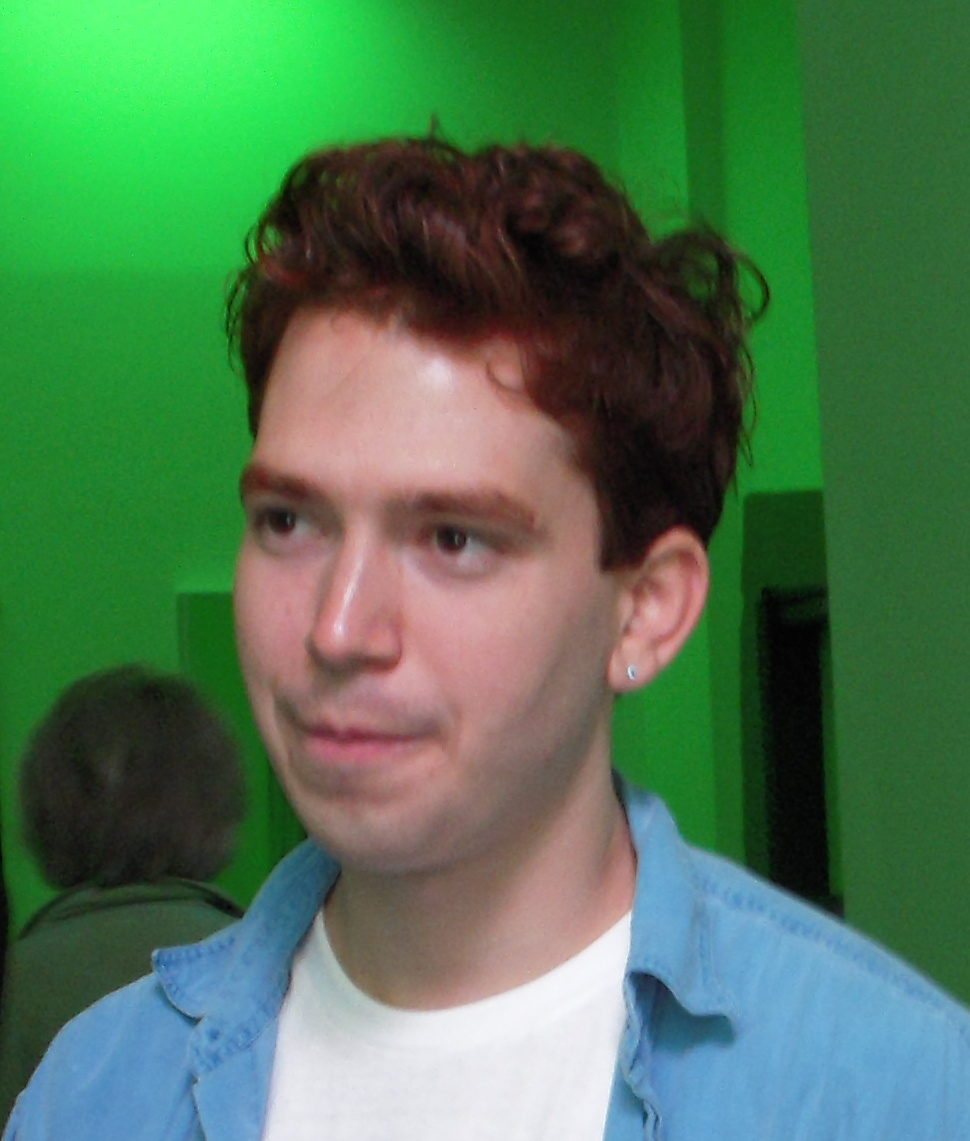
Artists such as Tabor Robak (left) and Ryan Trecartin (right) produced the visuals for Genre-Specific Xperience.

Genre-Specific Xperience opens with "Hip Hop Spa," the easiest track for Qadiri to create due to hip hop's “broad visual language.” "Hip Hop Spa" includes chanting, steel drums, and drum machines. As Benns summarized Kamau Patton's video for the song, it "depicts typical hip-hop video elements—money, women, drugs—and films them in a disaffected, distorted and rough manner." Both Patton and Qadiri also took into consideration the similarities between being in "solitary confinement in a spa" and being isolated from other humans in prison when making the track and visuals. "D-Medley" continues the structure of "Hip Hop Spa," maintaining the chants, steel drum sounds, and electronic drums and adding trance-style synthesizers to it. "D-Medley"'s video was produced by Thunder Horse and, as Flood wrote, "explores the fantasy realm through culled YouTube footage of bodacious babes."

"How Can I Resist U" and "Corpcore" are Genre-Specific Xperience''s more dancefloor-suitable tracks. "How Can I Resist U" consists of what Reynaldo described as "stuttering snares, tweaked vocal samples, and thick, lurching bass tones." The track's video was directed by Sophia Al-Maria and was described by Qadiri as a "love letter to London, dubstep and being a Gulf Arab" The video is a collection of footage downloaded from YouTube of females dancing at men's-only parties in the Middle East. As Qadiri explained, "The video is about temptation and the relationship between the Gulf and London, how London represents a kind of forbidden fruits playground for Gulf Arabs for several decades now."

The fourth track on the EP is "Vatican Vibes." It's driven by a two-second loop of a Gregorian chant, and a journalist for The National wrote that it "traps the listener inside a video game-cum-hall of mirrors, a prism of sounds and melodies wherein beats and synth voices bounce and refract off each other." Tabor Robak was responsible for directing the visuals for "Vatican Vibes," consisting of a compilation of stock footage and computer-generated imagery meant to visualize the genre of "Gregorian trance." She first listened to music of the style by artists such as Enigma at the age of nine while riding from Kuwait to Bahrain and enjoyed it for its "cinematic and over-the-top" elements. The video is also intended represent Catholicism as a video game with rules and strategies. As Qadiri explained, "I've always viewed organised religion as a means of consolidating power, and the Vatican is [home to] one of the oldest, most organised religions in the world. The incredible amount of mysticism behind it was deconstructed through the use of the video game aesthetic, which is very basic, very obvious, totally lacking in mystery – but still feeds into this notion of power and conspiracy." As The National stated, "the video and music function as an uncloaking of theosophy, wittily and satirically revealing something rather childish about the demands of religious authority."

Genre-Specific Xperience closes with "Corpcore." Its visuals were produced by Ryan Trecartin and Rhett LaRue in collaboration with TELFAR for his installation titled FORmale, which took place at the White Box Gallery in New York from 10 September to 12 September 2010. The visuals mix together real-life footage of offices, clubbing and gymnasiums with 3D graphics. This is intended to show a connection between dancing at a club and exercising in that they involve someone pushing his limits. Given that the track is a reinterpretation of juke house, it also shows similarities between Chicago's corporate culture and the city's underground producers that make juke. As Qadiri explained, both workers and house producers "have this stamina and determination, almost like the nine-to-five ethic. But operating at different hours."

== Release and promotion ==
The video for "Vatican Vibes" was first released on 13 October 2011. An official release party for Genre-Specific Xperience took place at the New Museum on 21 October 2011. In addition to the tracks being played, all of the music videos also premiered at the event. UNO Records officially released the extended play on 25 October 2011.

== Critical reception ==
Professional ratings
Review scores
Source	Rating
Now	3/5 Ns
Pitchfork	7.5/10
XLR8R	8/10

As Reynaldo wrote about the EP for XLR8R, "it's rare than an artist can take a disparate list of genre influences—all of them heavily namechecked in various tastemaking circles—and distill them into anything resembling a cohesive, let alone quality, statement, but that's exactly what Al Qadiri has done." He praised it for being "surprisingly welcoming, as there is nothing particularly weird or difficult about Genre-Specific Xperience, even if Al Qadiri's recipe for constructing it was rather complex." He also spotlighted the record's "universal sound." A writer for Now called the EP's material "blissful, intriguing," "evocative and sometimes humorous." Battan called the EP "more compelling" than Qadiri's previous release Warn-U (2011), writing that it "can lean toward gimmickry, but Al Qadiri stays on the right side of that line throughout most of the EP's 23 minutes."

In 2019, Pitchfork ranked the release at number 197 in their list of "The 200 Best Albums of the 2010s"; editor Julianne Escobedo Shepherd wrote: "Few documents of global music this decade were as interesting as [...] Genre-Specific Xperience, an icy, minimal exercise in translating and flattening microgenres—juke, dubstep, digital tropicália—into a cohesive statement that tied to her international upbringing and youth as a gamer."

== Track listing ==
Derived from the liner notes of Genre-Specific Xperience.

No.	Title	Length
1.	"Hip Hop Spa"	4:24
2.	"D-Medley"	6:51
3.	"How Can I Resist U"	3:33
4.	"Vatican Vibes"	5:16
5.	"Corpcore"	3:23
Total length:		23:27

== Personnel ==
Derived from the liner notes of Genre-Specific Xperience.

- Written and produced by Fatima Al Qadiri
- Artwork by Daniel Keller and Timur Si-Qin
- "Hip Hop Spa" and "How Can I Resist U" mixed by Dave Cooley
- "D-Medley," "Vatican Vibes," and "Corpcore" mixed by Nickolas Chacona
- Mastered by Loop-o at Dubplates & Mastering in Berlin, Germany

== Release history ==
Region	Date	Format(s)	Label
Worldwide	25 October 2011	CD; digital download; vinyl	UNO

== GSX Remixes ==
GSX Remixes

Remix album by Fatima Al Qadiri
- Released: 22 May 2012
- Length: 30:18
- Label: UNO
- Producer: Girl Unit; DJ Rashad; Kingdom; Dutch E Germ; Dubbel Dutch; Nguzunguzu; Ikonika

Fatima Al Qadiri chronology
Genre-Specific Xperience (2011)	GSX Remixes (2012)	Desert Strike (2012)

Not long after the release of Genre-Specific Xperience, Qadiri conceived the idea of doing an album of remixes of tracks from the EP. A remix album titled GSX Remixes was issued by UNO on 22 May 2012 and consists of seven re-edits of tracks from the original record.

Girl Unit contributed a remix of "How Can I Resist U," which, as the producer explained, added "super saturated sounds" and brought the "swirling synth line from the original down into a stormy, tense affair which switches up to this serene moment in which the signature vocals slip in, and then switch back with this constant hard/soft dynamic." Ezra Rubin, known by his stage name as Kingdom, made a "three chapter remix" of Corpcore. As he explained, "there's an industrial funk build up that brings you to the door of the club, a really hyperactive bass drop area, then the floor to the club opens and you fall into the bump and grind blacklight room below." Kingdom wanted to remix "Corpcore" because he enjoyed the original track's clap programming. Nguzunguzu produced a re-edit of "Hip Hop Spa" which made the track's minimal percussions much more heavy-sounding.

Dubbel Dutch made a remix of "Vatican Vibes" that consists of sounds that reference other genres; the E-mu Proteus flutes reference grime music, the snare sounds are borrowed from the soundtrack for the film Drumline (2002), and the "cut-time percussion" that plays during the breakdowns and end of the remix use zouk-and-tarracha-style rhythms. He originally planned for his remix to be "atmospheric." However, he quickly changed his initial plan: "I found it really challenging to incorporate the lead melodies from Vatican Vibes mainly because the licks that Fatima wrote were so strong that I didn't want to fall into the trap of making a remix that sounded more like a bad edit of the original – so instead I tried to incorporate pieces of the melody into a new variation on the theme."

=== Track listing ===
Derived from the linter notes of GSX Remixes.

No.	Title	Length
1.	"How Can I Resist U" (Girl Unit remix)	4:10
2.	"Vatican Vibes" (DJ Rashad remix)	3:51
3.	"Corpcore" (Kingdom remix)	4:02
4.	"D-Medley" (Dutch E Germ remix)	5:39
5.	"Vatican Vibes" (Dubbel Dutch remix)	4:38
6.	"Hip Hop Spa" (Nguzunguzu remix)	4:16
7.	"D-Medley" (Ikonika remix)	3:42
Total length:		30:18

=== Release history ===
Region	Date	Format(s)	Label
Worldwide	22 May 2012	CD; digital download; vinyl	UNO
