= Shaneera =

EP by Fatima Al Qadiri
- Released: 13 October 2017
- Genre: Khaleeji; grime; ballroom; bass
- Length: 21:09
- Label: Hyperdub
- Producer: Fatima Al Qadiri

Fatima Al Qadiri chronology
Brute (2016)	Shaneera (2017)	Medieval Femme (2021)

Singles from Shaneera
- 1. "Alkahaf" Released: 12 September 2017

Shaneera is an extended play by Kuwait musician Fatima Al Qadiri, released on 13 October 2017 via the label Hyperdub. Marking Qadiri's move towards more dance-orientated material, Shaneera is conceptually about an "evil queen" that defies "binary status quo gender roles," a character that Qadiri appears as on the EP's cover art. Many critics found Shaneera much better than Qadiri's previous records for its playful use of its concept.

== History ==
Qadiri stated in an interview that, since she was a child, she was "rebelling" against Kuwait's "binary status quo gender roles" that she claims to have always been "shoved down [people's] throat[s]" by society. As she explained, "I go backwards and forwards with it, and especially in the music industry, I'm very aware of the role of gender and the need to be sexy, the need to sell a sexualized persona." The concept of making an album about a "gender-defying person" was formed by Qadiri in November 2016 while she was in Kuwait.

That same month, she met some non-binary people at a party who would later become friends with her and make vocal contributions to Shaneera. For safety reasons, most of the featured acts are credited on the EP under fake pseudonyms, including Bobo Secret, a worker in finance, Lama3an, a Kuwaiti/Iraqi architect, and Nayglow. The only featured artist credited under his real name is Khalid al Gharaballi, also known by his stage name as Chaltham. Describing Shaneera as her most "anxiety-ridden" release, Qadiri stated: "I actually had to censor parts of the record. Originally, I wanted it to be a lot more obscene, a lot more graphic. Sexually graphic. It's easier to attack things when they're more overt."

The artwork for Shaneera depicts Qadiri as the LP's titular evil queen wearing "extreme makeup," something that she stated was a huge trend in Kuwait media and popular culture in the 2000s. The makeup was done by drag queen makeup artist Arabia Felix, whom Chatham discovered via Instagram. With "Alkahaf" issued as the EP's lead single on 12 September 2017, Shaneera was released by Hyperdub on 13 October 2017.

== Concept and composition ==
According to the album's official press release, Shaneera is "somewhere in an undisclosed setting and is a love letter to evil and benevolent queens around the world." The LP's title is an English mispronunciation of shanee’a (شنيعة), an Arabic word that literally translates to “outrageous, nefarious, hideous, major and foul.” In Kuwait, shaneera is a slang term to describe a very intelligent and dangerous “evil queen," and many of Qadiri's non-binary friends who lived in Kuwait used the term. On the cover art for Shaneera, Qadiri appears as this evil queen.

The lyrics are in a combination of various Arabic languages, such as Kuwaiti, Egyptian, and Iraqi Arabic. The press release labeled the lyrical content as "suggestive, imploring, shady and loving." The EP includes an equal amount of improvised vocal recordings and samples of chats and comedy skits that took place on the gay chat site Grindr. “Spiral,” in particular, includes a snippet of the line “I'm wearing a dancing outfit, and I'm in the bordello," taken from a popular gay anthem by Lebanese drag queen entertainer Bassem Feghali, "the most famous drag queen in the Arab world" according to Qadiri. The Fader described Shaneera as a "record that, while certainly a celebration of the shaneeras they know and love, is also a reminder of the oppression they face, and the secrecy and codes LGBTQ people rely on to survive."

Musically, Shaneera combines together Khaleeji music with the grime and trap music styles present on several of Qadiri's previous records. It is a much more fast-paced and dance-oriented release that her previous works, heavily containing influences of UK bass, Qween Beat-style ballroom house, and hard drum sounds a la UK electronic label Her Records. Bobo Secret sings on most of the EP's tracks, and his vocal performance is a major part of the record's sinister tone, described by Pitchfork reviewer Ben Cardew having "the melodramatic menace of a Disney villain."

== Critical reception ==
Professional ratings
Review scores
Source	Rating
Pitchfork	7.6/10
Resident Advisor	4/5

Cardew favorably stated that Shaneera is "packed with melody, drama, and joy," also describing it as "theatrical, intense, and frequently funny, marked by Secret’s vampish, regal projections." He praised Qadiri's production, writing that it has a "furious intensity that amplifies the EP’s drama." He also compared the EP's vocal melodies to her studio album Asiatisch (2014), stating that both releases contain "Al Qadiri’s most powerful hooks." Writer Mollie Zhang called Shaneera a superior release to Qadiri's previous record Brute (2016). She praised Qadiri's direction towards a more dance-infused style, reasoning that while Brute "felt somewhat tired in how Al Qadiri hammered home her conceptual and political intents behind the record, stifling the music in the process," Shaneera involved Qadiri having fun with the concept she was working with. Similarly, critic Tom Faber wrote Shaneera had a "far stronger marriage of idea and execution" than Qadiri's previous releases, reasoning that she "tackles the music with an original approach and a playful ear." The EP placed number four on Time Out New York's list of the best albums of 2017.

== Track listing ==
The track lengths are derived from the official Bandcamp page for Shaneera.

No.	Title	Vocalist(s)	Length
1.	"Shaneera"	Bobo Secret; Lama3an	3:40
2.	"Is2aleeha"	Bobo Secret; Chatham	4:29
3.	"Alkahaf"	Bobo Secret; Lama3an	4:34
4.	"Spiral"	Bobo Secret	3:23
5.	"Galby"	Nayglow	5:03
Total length:			21:09

== Release history ==
Region	Date	Format(s)	Label
Worldwide	13 October 2017	Digital download; vinyl	Hyperdub
