= Sponsored Content =

Sponsored content is a form of native advertising.

Sponsored Content may refer to:

- Sponsored Content (album), a 2017 album by Antwood
- "Sponsored Content" (South Park), a 2015 TV episode
