= Monira Al Qadiri =

Senegalese-born artist (born 1983)

- Born: 1983 (age 42–43); Dakar, Senegal
- Education: Tokyo University of the Arts, Intermedia Art (PhD)
- Website: https://www.moniraalqadiri.com

Monira Al Qadiri (born 1983) is a Senegalese-born Kuwaiti visual artist, who is currently based in Berlin. Her work employs various media, including video, sculptures, installation art and performances. She's had several solo exhibitions, which include the Blaffer Art Museum in Houston, Haus der Kunst in Munich, and Sursock Museum in Beirut. Her works have also been part of group exhibitions in internationally renowned museums, including the Museum of Modern Art in New York and Palais de Tokyo in Paris. Recurring themes in Al Qadiri's work are petrostates and gender identity.

== Biography ==
Al Qadiri was born in Senegal, where her father was a diplomat. Her mother, Thuraya Al-Baqsami worked as an artist, and her older sister, Fatima Al Qadiri, would later become an artist and musician. In 1985, the family moved back to Kuwait, where they lived through the 1991 Gulf War. Al Qadiri moved to Japan at age 16, where she studied for ten years. In 2010, she obtained her PhD in Intermedia Art at Tokyo University of the Arts, with a dissertation called 'The Aesthetics of Sadness in the Middle East'.

== Career ==
In 2003, the Qatari Embassy in Berlin asked the multinational artist Monira Al Qadiri if she would like to design the United Buddy Bear for Qatar. Since then, it has been traveling around the world with the United Buddy Bears World Tour and has been displayed in over 35 exhibitions on all five continents.

In 2013 Al Qadiri founded the Gulf art collective GCC, together with her sister, Fatima Al Qadiri, Nanu Al Hamad, Khalid Al Gharaballi, Sophia Al Maria, Aziz Al Qatami, Barrak Alzaid, and Amal Khalaf. GCC is a reference to the English abbreviation of the Gulf Cooperation Council, an economic and political consortium of Arabian Gulf nations. In 2016 she started a residency at the Rijksakademie van Beeldende Kunsten in Amsterdam. Venues to have shown her work include the Blaffer Art Museum in Houston, Berlinische Galerie, Haus der Kunst in Munich, Kunstverein Göttingen, Gasworks in London, Palais de Tokyo in Paris and MoMA PS1 in New York. The Van Abbemuseum in Eindhoven and Jameel Arts Centre in Dubai have works of Al Qadiri in their permanent collection.

== Recurring themes ==
=== Petrostates ===
Pearls and oil are recurring motifs in Al Qadiri's work. Her grandfather was a singer on a pearl diving boat, which was Kuwaits main industry before the country became a petrostate. With her work, Al Qadiri tries to preserve collective memories in the risk of disappearing. In several works, Al Qadiri connects pearls to oil, as they both have the same iridescent colour. The work Spectrum I is an example of this. Another example of the petrostate motif is the sculpture Empire Dye (2018). It shows a sea shell of the Murex snail in bright violet colour, and substantially enlarged in size. The colour refers to the colour of the alarm at oil rigs that flashes when it is about to explode. Al Qadiris sculpture acts as a warning signal for the current climate crisis.

=== Gender identity ===
Another recurring theme is gender identity. In several of her performances, Al Qadiri can be found cross-dressing. She states that it acts as 'a vehicle for transformation and chameleon-ism'. An example is her performance Abu Athiyya (Father of Pain), in which Al Qadiri portrays the southern Iraqi singer Yas Khodhor. Her fascination for drag can be traced back to her youth in Kuwait, where women are housebound for safety reasons. She started to link being male to being powerful, and wanted to become like them. In her teen years, she would often have a buzz cut and wear fake moustaches. While she does not do drag anymore, her works are still filled with it. Also, a lot of her video art is narrated by deep male voices, for instance Behind the Sun (2013) and Rumours of Affluence (2012).
