= Exo (album) =

Studio album by Gatekeeper
- Released: July 17, 2012
- Recorded: 2011–2012
- Genre: Electronic body music; aggrotech; intelligent dance music; acid techno
- Length: 35:18
- Label: Hippos in Tanks

Gatekeeper chronology
Giza (2010)	Exo (2012)

Exo is the first studio album of Chicago-based electronic duo Gatekeeper, consisting of musicians Aaron David Ross and Matthew Arkell. It was released on July 17, 2012, on the label Hippos in Tanks. The EBM, IDM and acid techno album departs from the synth-heavy style of Gatekeeper's past releases, in that most of the melodies are performed by a sampler with a sound palette of high-definition Hollywood film sound effects. Gatekeeper was inspired to follow this HD aesthetic from an experience at World Heritage Sites which made them feel "really spiritual and charged up" to create the first track on the album, "IMAX." Exo was promoted with a visual exploration video game with environments designed by Contemporary artist Tabor Robak using the game engine Unity. Reviews for Exo from music journalists were favorable in general, holding an aggregate 70 out of 100 on Metacritic as of February 2017.

== Background and HD concept ==
"Something that's interesting about Exo is that it's really a hybrid art-piece and commercial project. It's not an art-piece sampling commercial aesthetics, it's not a commercial project trying to look artsy – it's a really interesting hybrid. We're trying to push the artistic aspect to the point where it's confusing what kind of product it is."

— Tabor Robak in an interview with Dazed

While on the last day of touring in the United Kingdom in the summer of 2011, Aaron David Ross and Matthew Arkell viewed World Heritage Sites which made them feel "really spiritual and charged up." In the winter of 2012, they moved back into their homes feeling inspired from these sites to create the first track the duo made which used high definition sounds. The track was titled "IMAX," and they used recordings from movie sound effect libraries. With the two feeling an "extra depth" in the quality of the sounds used for the track, the experience would later become the inspiration for a high definition aesthetic of the music of Exo and a visual gaming environment for it by Internet artist Tabor Robak; Gatekeeper and Robak described it as "HDIY."

Gatekeeper and Thomas Robak said that works with an HDIY style look or sound professionally made despite being created in a quick amount of time with non-professional material. Robak claimed the HD part of it was “a commitment to quality and a level of detail” as well as a "response" to the heavy prominence of lo-fi music that was going on at the time. In fact, Exo, which is entirely made out of very high-quality sounds, examines the high amount of presence of high-definition video content in everyday life and how HD technology can lead to unthinkable possibilities.

== Gaming environment and visuals ==
Gatekeeper first met Internet artist Tabor Robak in a MySpace meeting, when Robak was still living in his hometown of Portland, Oregon. At the time, Robak still had a very limited skill in creating video game-esque virtual landscapes, his only experience being his and Jon Rafman's art piece BrandNewPaintJob.exe (BNPJ-EXE) which he described as "not much better than Doom." The three "tossed around jpegs and stuff" for a few years before meeting in person at a Gatekeeper New Year's Eve performance in Portland in 2010. They all quickly bonded with each other thereafter with Robak moving into New York with the duo. The process of making the project involved the duo and Robak constantly sending musical and visual plans and concepts to each other without taking a break to the point where they were "pretty much living Exo.”

The Exo video game has a similar gameplay style to Journey (2012) and Proteus (2013), where the player goes through environments to excite his or her imagination. Ross described Exo's feel as more "immersive" than the "VHS fuzziness" of Gatekeeper's previous release, Giza (2010). The duo and Robak claimed that with Exo, they wanted the viewer to feel like they were in virtual reality. Robak used the game engine Unity to create the environments for the game of Exo. Unlike the making of the visuals for Gatekeeper's extended play Giza, where Chicago production team Thunder Horse produced them with the involvement of the duo, Robak was given complete control over how he would design the visuals for Exo. Many of the effects and objects used in the environments, such as trees, rocks and camera systems, were bought from Unity's app store, but Robak stated that the challenge came from where he would place these objects in the environments so they would look natural. Robak's ability in designing game-like worlds advanced from "Super Nintendo to Xbox 360" level during the one year it took to create Exo overall.

== Music ==
Exo is an EBM, IDM and acid techno record with 1990s urban science fiction moods. Sound effects that are commonly found in high-definition film trailers are present throughout most of the record to develop each environment of the track. The sounds were sampled with Logic Pro's EXS sampler to perform "alien" out-of-scale melodies. Exo is less synthesizer-heavy than Gatekeeper's past releases; however, synthesizer sounds still do occainsionally pop up on the record, such as the LFO-gliding noise sounds on "Tree Drum." All of the analog synth sounds on Exo were done with the Sequential Circuits Pro-One. Sounds made with the Roland TB-303 bass synthesizer are also on many of Exo's tracks, which gives the record its acid sound; Gatekeeper enjoyed the 303's "historically futuristic techno quality and hypnotic sonic ferocity." Ross said that the reason for the album's acid elements was for its "playfullness," saying that "it speaks so directly, it activates such a specific reference, you're going to hear it in really similar ways."

All of the instruments were recorded all at once in one-take jam sessions, and the recordings were synced to a Roland TR-707 drum machine. All of the jam recordings were heavily edited. A majority of the editing included numerous hours of additional audio synchronization, given that the 707 could only sync up the rhythm of all instruments perfectly for only a limited amount of time. However, there were a few kick drum notes performed that were left slightly off the downbeat. All of the instrument channels in the Logic sessions of each song were heavily filtered, having approximately ten effects units and audio plug-ins that, in Ross's words, worked against each other. Ross said that "what you achieve from that is you have maybe one little loop as an audio track that's in time and really powerful and working perfectly—if you modulate reverbs or phasers or other kinds of effects over time on that sound, you have this evolution of it." The Roland SH-101 was commonly used to create high-pitched portamento'd percussion sounds and hi-hats.

Gatekeeper created the music of Exo using imagery containing references to films, but the use of those references was improvised instead of planned out to give the LP a vague narrative that's up to listener interpretation. The album follows a basic narrative about a world that is created from the beginning of the LP and destroyed at the end; it starts with spiritual space sounds in "Dromos" before the record gradually gets darker to the point where an apocalypse occurs by the closing track "Encarta."

== Release and promotion ==
Exo was first announced on June 28, 2012 with the artwork that was also designed by Robak revealed. Robak also designed a font that was used to create secret message in the album's artwork, and it became downloadable on June 28. The cover art was panned by Vincent Pollard of Exclaim! for being "god-awful and embarrassingly dated."

== Critical reception ==
Professional ratings
Aggregate scores
Source	Rating
Metacritic	70/100
Review scores
Source	Rating
The 405	7/10
AllMusic	4/5 stars
The List	3/5 stars
NME	3.5/5 stars
Pitchfork	5.8/10
Spin	5/10
Sputnikmusic	4.5/5
Tiny Mix Tapes	2.5/5 stars

Reviews of Exo from music journalists upon its release were positive in general. Sputnikmusic called Exo "impenetrable, multifaceted, and irrepressibly imaginative," praising for being serious and dark while still having a humorous quality to it that "can only be accompanied by some winking self-awareness." He also compared the record to the works of Ryan Trecartin, in that it has influences that feel familiar to the listener yet are unique to the album and have never existed before: "Gatekeeper's sonic predecessors are obvious yet disparate, and what makes the duo's music so striking is the resultant fusion of all these influences." Allmusic journalist Robert Ham scored the album four stars out of five, mainly praising the sounds used on the album. His only criticism was the short lengths of each track, writing that "songs build and build and build toward a glorious apex, but then quickly die out, not letting listeners truly have the space to lose themselves in the vintage acid beats and squiggling synth noise." The 405's Corao Malley spotlight's the record immersive feel, writing that it "is so much more than them sum of its parts, creating its own, high-energy, high-speed world and sounding better with each passing listen." A Pitchfork reviewer described Exo as "gloriously dumb" and, in some spots, "promisingly brazen." However, he also noted the LP's futuristic element to be "stunted by the past bearing down too hard on their coattails."

In a more mixed review, Jonathan Dean of Tiny Mix Tapes disliked Exo for only being a revitalization of 1990s electronic body music and aggrotech, a genre that was not well received by music critics because, in Dean's words, it was "terrible." He panned the album for "telling rather than showing," writing that it used a very complex concept to make up for the actual music being bland and forgettable: "[Exo] provoke[s] an interesting set of concepts and questions, which is good, but results in an album in which a majority of the heavy lifting is performed by the extra-textual aspects of the project, providing undeserved depth to a series of obsessive repetitions of the banal." Another mixed opinion came from Spin magazine writer Christopher R. Weingarten, who said that the LP's "intentionally chintzy acid house" ruined any sort of tension it had from sounds such as "blood drips, smoking bullet casings drop" and "a robotic slasher flick."

== Track listing ==
All tracks written by Gatekeeper

1. "Imax" – 1:21
2. "Exolift" – 3:09
3. "Visitor" – 0:32
4. "Bog" – 3:41
5. "Vengier" – 3:28
6. "Hydrus" – 4:44
7. "Pre-Gen" – 0:52
8. "Tree Drum" – 2:57
9. "Dromos" – 4:14
10. "Aero" – 4:24
11. "Re-gen" – 2:00
12. "Encarta" – 3:56
