= Antwood =

Canadian music producer

Antwood is the alias of Tristan Douglas, a Canadian electronic music producer. Under the moniker "Margaret Antwood," Douglas' 2015 EP "Work Focus" was listed in Vogue 's best music of 2015. In 2016 Antwood's debut album Virtuous.scr was released by Planet Mu. Virtuous.scr, which explored themes of artificial intelligence and robot ethics, was widely well-received; it was featured in Resident Advisor's top recommendations as well as The Wire.

Antwood's second album, Sponsored Content, was released in September 2017, and deals with "subversive" advertising in the media.

The third album from Antwood, Delphi, was released in July 2019, and uses "conceptual frameworks to facilitate the writing process [..] to develop a fictional character: the young lovelorn Delphi." This character is represented throughout by a recurring melody, with the album develops the story around her.
