= Giza (EP) =

EP by Gatekeeper
- Released: December 13, 2010
- Recorded: 2010
- Studio: Chicago; New York City
- Genre: Electronic
- Length: 13:00
- Label: Merok
- Producer: Gatekeeper

Gatekeeper chronology
Optimus Maximus (2009)	Giza (2010)	Exo (2012)

Giza is the second extended play of duo Gatekeeper, consisting of musicians Aaron David Ross and Matthew Arkell. It was released in December 2010 by the label Merok Records. The duo made Giza with a setting of ancient ruins in mind, due to their interest of theories regarding ancient astronauts that they had garnered. They also expanded their film score influence to science fiction and fantasy films in addition to horror movies. Giza was promoted with music videos for all of the tracks. All of the videos were produced by production team Thunder Horse and were released online on the website 20JazzFunkGreats as well as on a limited-edition VHS tape. The video for "Chains" was ranked number ten on a list of best music videos of 2010 by the magazine XLR8R.

== Composition and critical analysis ==
With Giza, Gatekeeper expanded their influence of horror film scores by composers such as John Carpenter to also include science fiction and fantasy films. The setting was also changed from the haunted forests of their debut extended play Optimus Maximus (2009) into ancient ruins in the middle of a desert for Giza. The reason for this change was that the group had got into theories regarding ancient astronauts, watching films like Chariots of the Gods (1970). Matt Arkell said that the desert had "this really bizarre exoticized feel to it, through cinema and popular culture over the past few decades."

Gatekeeper cited religious vocal music, electronic body music, acid trance and early techno music as influences for making the music of Giza. Music journalists additionally noticed elements of the works of Cold Cave, The Hasbeens, Cabaret Voltaire and Kraftwerk and genres like Detroit techno and Italo disco. The Quietus journalist John Calvert called Giza "brilliantly period-precise," noting that its sonic elements sounded like they were made from "dodgy imitative synths, digital emulators, imperfect programming and tacky presets." He, as well as Pitchfork writer Jess Harvell, also spotlighted Gatekeeper's skill of creating tracks with elements from dark films while still keeping the songs danceable and exciting, which Calvert wrote "takes real panache." Some reviewers noted that the group went out of the boundaries of their main style and were freer with their sounds than on Optimus Maximus. Rich Etteridge of The Line of Best Fit described the majority of Giza as "more filler than thriller," writing that it "just doesn’t keep the pulsating momentum throughout" as the title track and "Chains" do.

== Songs ==
Giza opens with "Chains", an industrial electronic body music song with a tech noir aestectic that soundtracks a ride through a hell-like computer-generated land. Etteridge jokingly described it as the "pervy step-father" of the theme for the television series The Equalizer, while Calvert compared it to "Tunnel Chase," a piece from the soundtrack to the film The Terminator (1984). The duo first created the bass part, which is performed on the track through a Sequential Circuits Pro-One synth, before the drum part was programmed through the Ultrabeat plugin of Logic Pro. There are samples of lines from cutscenes of the game Diablo II (2000) and the film Hellbound: Hellraiser II (1988), which the group downloaded from YouTube. The track opens with sounds of a motorcycle starting up and a racing horse before, as Calvert writes, "a jump-scare primer triggers the type of cyclonic modulation perfect for road-battles and low-camera speeds." The track also has a break influenced by the theme for The X-Files and the works of Isao Tomita, and the duo said that making this part fit with the rest of the track was a difficult task.

The choruses of "Storm Column" are led by a noise pulse that goes through a 12 db high-pass filter programmed with a Korg MS20 synthesizer. Other sections of the track are driven by pitch wheel'd square wave sounds also programmed with the MS20. Making the track was the first time the duo was able to connect the MS20 through a patch panel for a Logic Pro session, which took many attempts. The Pro-One was used to create the cut's Vangelis-esque synth arpeggios and portamento'd basses, which are also filtered and increase in the amount of reverbation they drench in as the track progresses. The song also has a bassline performed by "KLUNKS", a preset from the Ensoniq ESQ-1 synthesizer.

"Serpent" starts with a bassline played by the Pro-One before the rock-influenced electronic drums and Korg Polysix-performed "oriental" arpeggio synth lines that are slightly off-tune kick into the mix. The lead melody is actually played by four synthesizers at the same time on the track: a Korg Wavestation, Roland JD-800, Kawai K1 and Roland Juno-6. The sounds these synths perform include analog-esque fantasy sounds and pan flutes, and the different sounds are faded in between to have the timbre of the lead melody sound changing. There is also monk singing on the track sample from recordings of music composed in the Byzantine Empire in the 1500s. For Giza's title track, Gatekeeper began composing the first four bars of the track that consist of out-of-tune and unharmonious synthesized strings programmed with the PolySix; the initial plan for the song was for it to be a tribute to "Final Search," a piece from the soundtrack for the film Friday the 13th (1980). After the beginning four bars, Wavestation-programmed tritone'd pan flutes and a computer-emulated Roland TR-909 kick drum come into the arrangement. The track's lead melody is performed by a bell courtesy of an Oberheim Matrix-6 synthesizer, which eases the tension of the overall song. The track's concept was changed to a soundtrack to, in the words of the duo, "Westly Snipes in Egypt" and "dusting vamp-ravers inside of a crowded nightclub."

The track "Mirage" was, according to the duo, an actual mirage. The song went through many revisions in regard to its style and the amount and type of effects placed on the bass part. They tried to make the song feel like the French science fiction film The Fifth Element (1997). Synthesizer pad chords sampled from the track "Power Plant" by the group Microchip League began the song. A heavily reverbed and compressed three-note acid trance-influenced synth line played by a Pro-One operates the track. There are also samples of recordings of Adhan prayers that were borrowed from YouTube and are re-pitched on the cut. Giza closes with "Oracle," a track with a sound palette of arpeggio lines performed by the Pro-One, the ESQ-1's "Mixed" choir preset, staccato JD-800 piano notes and samples of dog barks that are pitched down. For the bassline, the Pro-One was used, where one of the pitches for the wave oscillators was put a 4th away from the original note to create a parallel harmony sound. Its lead melody was, according to the duo, a "loose adaption" of a piece from The NeverEnding Story (1984).

== Music videos ==
On October 12, 2010, the video for "Chains" by production team Thunder Horse premiered, and feature 1990s-computer-game-esque 3D graphics. The Fader described the plot of the video as a "computer animated ghost motorcycle riding through what basically looks like hell if hell happened to be made out of mercury." The video ranked number ten on a list of the best videos of 2010 by magazine XLR8R. Between December 6 to 10, 2010, the videos for the rest of Giza's tracks premiered on the snuff film website 20JazzFunkGreats. The music video for "Serpent" was the first of these to be released on the site. The video is about a titular soundwave named Serpent that is built to cripple unexplored parts of a human's spirit. Created by a mysticist group from other dimensions, the wave goes into vertebral column where it'll inject a serum named Front 242 in order for it to control the whole body. The wave goes through visions of unfinished VHS horror movie tapes as it twists out of its normal shape in a danceable manner.

The second video to be released was the one for "Oracle" on December 7. It follows teenagers who use a ouija board to order a pizza. For the "Mirage" video, which was released on December 8, Thunder Horse collaborated with the Lenox Brothers, another production team who did most of the video's animation. It showcases a mood-drugged person's vision of the leader of a desert-based psychic group. The fourth video 20JazzFunkGreats premiered, which was for the title track, came out on December 9. It follows a high school student vampire played by Wallsey Snips as he is controlled by a "Demon Headmaster" played by Christopher Lee. On the December 10, 2010, the last video, which was for "Storm Column," premiered, and consists of footage of the Statue of Liberty as it morphs into "universe building spheres." All of the music videos were released on VHS under the name GIZA: the HDvhs Experience, which was a limited edition of 100 copies.

== Artwork ==
Giza's artwork was designed by Australian science fiction illustrator Dan McPharlin, and went through many versions and redesigns. The duo wanted the cover to have a “choose your own adventure” feel where it was a land that could be interpreted in any way. Etteridge praised the cover art, writing that it "wonderfully captures this retro-futurist feel to the EP." Harvell described the cover art as "an Atari cartridge meets the Portable Grindhouse aesthetic."

== Track listing ==
Giza
No.	Title	Length
1.	"Chains"	3:41
2.	"Storm Column"	3:30
3.	"Serpent"	3:24
4.	"Giza"	3:14
5.	"Mirage"	3:25
6.	"Oracle"	2:46
Total length:		13:00

== Release history ==
Region	Date	Format(s)	Label
Worldwide	December 13, 2010	Digital download; vinyl	Merok
