= Francis Ruyter =

American artist

Francis Ruyter (born 1968) is an American painter and gallerist. He was born in Washington, DC. Ruyter often paints using photographs as source material, in a style that has been compared to Pop art. In 2002 he produced a billboard work, as part of MoMA Projects 77. His work is included in the permanent collections of the Museum of Modern Art, New York, SFMOMA, the Pérez Art Museum Miami, and the Denver Art Museum.

== See also ==
- Team Gallery
