= Tabor Robak =

American contemporary artist (born 1986)

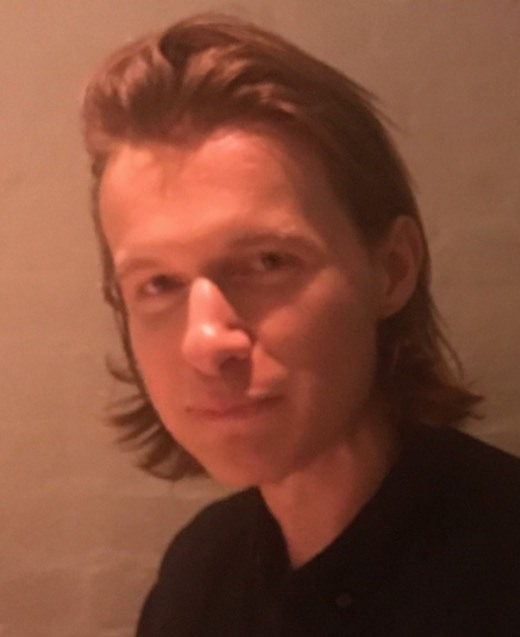
- Robak in 2017
- Born: May 31, 1986 (age 40); Portland, Oregon, U.S.
- Education: Pacific Northwest College of Art (BFA)
- Occupation: Contemporary artist
- Website: www.taborrobak.com

Tabor Robak (born May 31, 1986) is an American contemporary artist working in New Media, living in Paris, France. Robak is primarily known for his trailblazing digital art practice, multi-channel video installations and generative artworks. Robak's work has been exhibited and collected internationally at renowned institutions such as Museum of Modern Art, Serpentine, National Gallery of Victoria, Albright Knox, and Migros Museum. In 2014, Robak was named in Forbes 30 Under 30 in Art. Robak has guest lectured MFA students at Yale and co-taught an MFA course on real time 3D at New York University.

The Metropolitan Museum of Art describes Robak as a "prodigy of digital effects" and "the most talented and interesting artist using computer graphics today."

== Early life and education ==
Tabor Robak was born in Portland, Oregon. He began working freelance as a photoshop editor at the age of 13, before earning a BFA from Pacific Northwest College of Art in Portland, Oregon. After earning his degree in 2010, Robak moved to New York City and began participating in group shows internationally at places such as MoMA PS1, Rhizome, Thaddeus Ropac, and the Lyon Biennale before his first solo exhibition at Team Gallery in 2013.

== Career and work ==
=== 2008-2012: Early career ===
During college, Robak began incorporating digital tools into his practice and uploading his work to his website and sites like tumblr to connect with the growing community of net artists. Robak's early works consisted of 3D interactive environments, to be accessed on the artist's website. These pieces, which the artist described as having a "desktop screensaver aesthetic," sought to isolate digital space as a fact, an abstracted, alternate reality. Many of Robak's works during this period were featured on Rhizome including his first online piece, Reality CPU, along with works such as Digital Spirituality, Carbon and Mansion.

In 2011 Robak formed HDBOYZ with fellow artists and friends, Alex-Kelly Hoffman, Ryder Ripps, Aaron David Ross and Colin Self. Dubbed by DIS Magazine as "the first internet boy band," they performed five songs including Photoshopped and HDMI in Love? at MoMA PS1 during the closing night of Ryan Trecartin's solo show.

In 2011, Robak designed and animated a music video in collaboration with artist and musician Fatima Al Qadari, for her song, Vatican Vibes. The video created a “visual analogy between the Vatican’s 'centuries-old mechanisms of control over people' and video gamers’ “godlike power over populations." The video premiered at the New Museum and toured internationally from 2011-2013.

In 2012, Robak created a downloadable interactive virtual environment for Gatekeeper’s album, EXO which was set to the music and doubled as the band’s tour visuals.

=== 2013-2019: Breakthrough and critical success ===
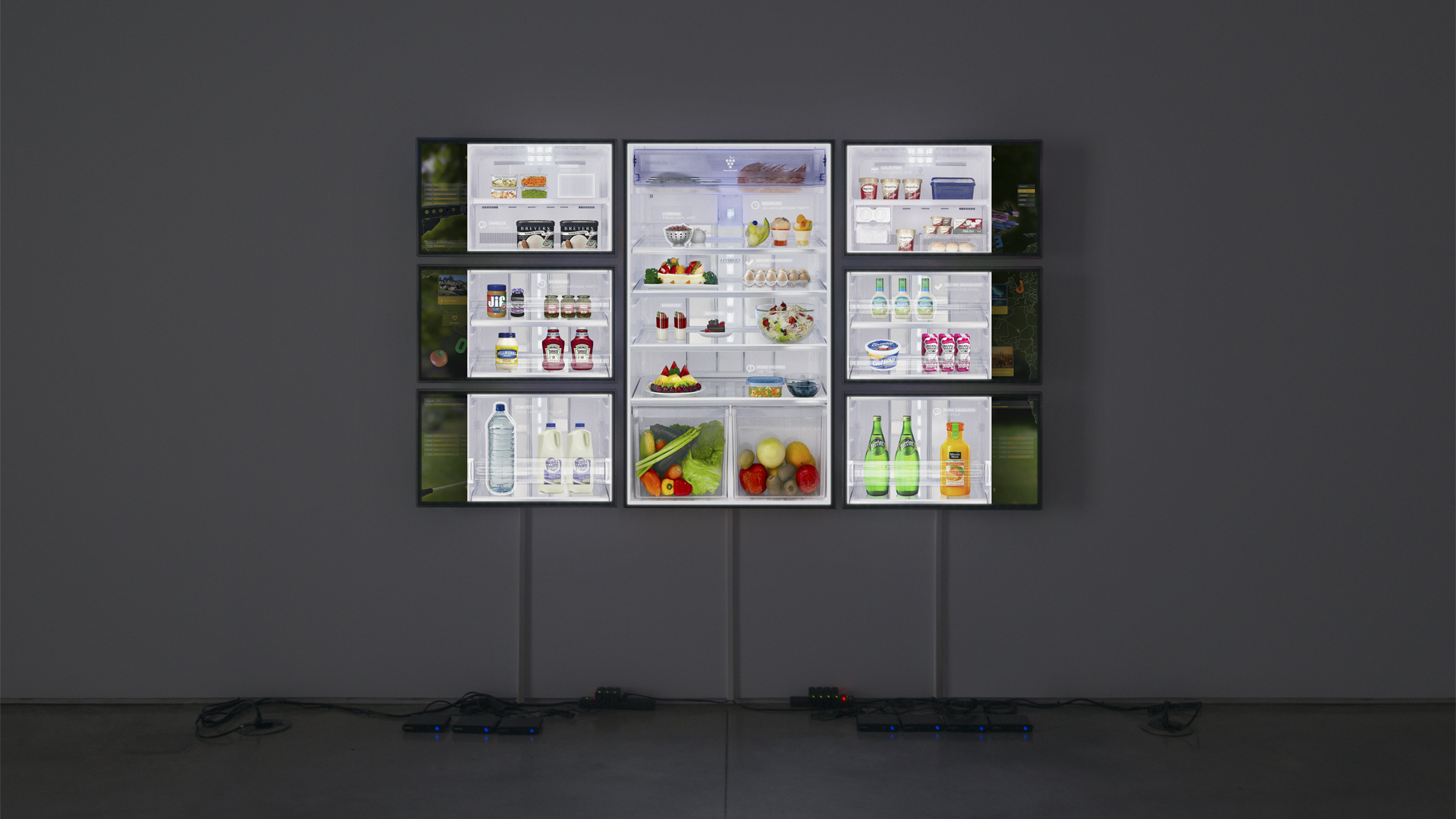
Xenix (2013) 7-channel 4K video, networked media players. From the show, Next-Gen Open Beta.

In 2013, Robak made his solo show debut at Team Gallery in New York City, entitled, “Next-Gen Open Beta.” Artforum described the show as, "visually breathtaking" with "painstakingly detailed environments that make as strong a case for technological accelerationism as they do for the somewhat old-world values of craftsmanship and painterly illusionism” and with imagery as “alienating as it is immersive” The New York Observer called the exhibition "one of the major events of the season" both because of the quality of the work and because it was "signaling [digital art's] newfound acceptance by big-league galleries like Team. Xenix, was later acquired by the Museum of Modern Art.

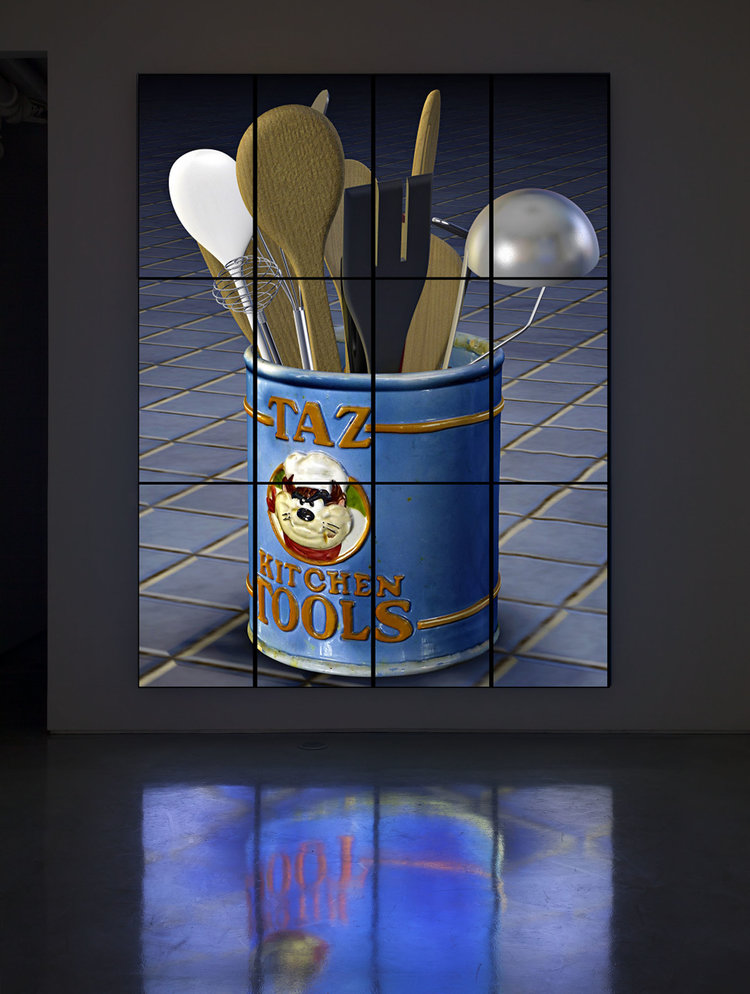
Where's My Water? (2015) 12-channel 8K video, networked media players. Permanent collection of the Metropolitan Museum of Art in New York City.

In 2015, Robak exhibited his second solo show at Team Gallery entitled, Fake Shrimp. The show featured 4 CGI works and received wide critical acclaim. Roberta Smith reviewed the exhibition in The New York Times, praising Robak's virtuosity, his dazzling visuality, and "his meshing of high and low; digital and labor-intensive; art and advertising." Lloyd Wise from Artforum described the show as “MDMA for the eye,” “sparkling and synthetic, color-splashed and sumptuous, gloriously seamless and refined." Wise described Robak’s mastery of digital tools as having a “next-level skill set of a virtuoso." New York Magazine dubbed Robak, "Pixelangelo" in reference to level of detail and the labor intensive process required in producing the show, noting that while the imagery was evocative of video games, the work was "exponentially more elaborate." Where’s My Water? was acquired by the Metropolitan Museum of Art in 2017.

In 2016, Robak presented his third solo show, Sunflower Seed, at Team Gallery's Venice Beach location in Los Angeles. The exhibition was also shown that summer in Sweden at Johan Berggren Gallery in Malmo. Critics praised Robak for having “choreographed a masterly and complex ballet of pixels” and noted the imagery was “meditative, whimsical, mesmerizing and almost impossible to walk away from.” The work was a thematic departure, with Robak exploring scenes from the natural world. Skypad was later added to the permanent collection of AkzoNobel Art Foundation, in Amsterdam.

In 2017, Robak exhibited his fourth solo show, Quantaspectra, at Team Gallery in New York City. Named for quantification via the color system, the show featured seven single channel works, each representing a different color and exploring different themes in a universe creation.

In 2019, Robak presented his 6th solo show, MENTAL, at vonammon co in Washington, DC. Arguably, his “most experimental exhibition to date," Robak explores “the bankruptcy of branding” and the “dystopian divide [between mind and body] that may be deepened by art.” The show received positive reviews with Artforum describing Robak’s mastery of the technology as "operating like a dark-web Nam June Paik.” The publication also noted Robak’s “critique is more specifically attuned to how capitalism elicits feelings of frustration and ambivalence in the field of contemporary art. Sculpture magazine compared the works to vanitas that “impart a loss of permanence and control, while paradoxically, signaling our shared vulnerability.”

In 2019, Robak exhibited Xenix, at the Museum of Modern Art, as part of the group show, New Order: Art and Technology in the 21st Century. The show was curated with work from the museum’s permanent collection and organized by Michelle Kuo. The New York Times called Robak’s work, “one of the most significant” in the exhibition.

In 2019, Robak exhibited, Flatearth.io, his first solo show in the Netherlands, at Upstream Gallery in Amsterdam. Critics called Robak, “the most compelling artist today working with computer-generated imagery” and praised his ability to elevate “the craftsmanship of CGI to the standing of intellectual art.”

=== 2020-present: Current projects ===
In December 2020, Robak presented, Megafauna, an 80 screen video installation commissioned by the National Gallery of Victoria for the museum’s Triennial, which featured an “immersive installation of computer-generated animations that surround the viewer in an entire gallery, and was “the biggest work he has ever made.”

In 2020, Robak's work was featured in group exhibitions worldwide including, Better off Online, presented by KÖNIG GALERIE at Ars Electronica; Art in the Age of Anxiety at Sharjah Art Foundation in Dubai; Open World: Video Games and Contemporary Art, at the Currier Museum of Art.

In 2021, Robak created Butterfly Room: Special Edition, for the group exhibition, World on a Wire, presented by Rhizome as part of a collaboration with Hyundai in Beijing.

In 2021, Robak's work was included in institutional group shows internationally including, How to Win at Photography as Fotomuseum Winterthur in Switzerland, and Reflections beyond the Surface at AkzoNobel Art Foundation in the Netherlands.

In 2022, Robak had a series of notable achievements, including the acquisition of his time-reactive procedurally generated artwork, Colorwheel, by the Whitney Museum in New York. He also experienced success in the NFT realm with his work, Colorspace, being selected for the curated collection on Art Blocks and selling out within an hour of its release. Additionally, Robak's 2013 artwork, Free-to-Play, was showcased at the Play - Video Game Art and Beyond exhibition held at the Palace of Venaria in Italy.

In 2023, Colorwheel, was featured in the exhibition Behind The Screens, at the CODA Museum, in the Netherlands. Later that year Robak gained representation by Super Dakota gallery in Brussels, Belgium. Additionally, Robak's work, Drinking Bird Universe, was included in the book Internet_Art: From the Birth of the Web to the Rise of NFTs by Omar Kholeif and published by Phaidon.

== Film and fashion ==
Robak programmed and designed the animated sequences in the 2015 film, #Horror, directed by Tara Subkoff, curated by Urs Fischer and starring Chloë Sevigny and Natasha Lyonne. The film premiered at the Museum of Modern Art.

Robak’s work, Mini Jumbo, a miniature Jumbotron sculpture from his show MENTAL, was showcased at Maison Margiela's concept store in Soho in as part of the first series of installations at the experimental boutique.

In 2019, Robak created a custom video loop of a cityscape set to unreleased tracks by DJ Hell for Balenciaga.

== Artistic process and themes ==
Robak's work utilizes the visual vocabulary of modern video games, advertising and animated film, to examine societal perceptions of the digital and the real. His work often deals with the tension between human nature and technology, exploring themes such as, late capitalism, mass media, trauma, domestic life, weapons, violence, robotics, healthcare and privacy.

Robak commonly employs several computer programs including Unity, Adobe After Effects, and Cinema 4D to create multi-channel video installations, procedurally generated animations, and electronic sculpture. He often incorporates novel technology including transparent television monitors, mini Raspberry Pi computers, and builds custom PCs for his procedurally generative works.

In his procedurally generated work, Robak programs software to create algorithmic visual compositions that mimic the gestures of a painter's brush stroke. He embraces generative code to produce those fleeting, but perfect moments akin to the serendipity of nature’s rhythms, believing the open-ended quality of this process presents more opportunities to replicate these moments than deliberate design.

Critics have referred to Robak’s proficiency with the software as “virtually unmatched” in the Art World, and praised Robak for bringing “an old-school sense of integrity and craft—even disciplinary rigor—to his digital practice, “exploring the medium of CGI the way Michelangelo did marble." His working method has been described as "fluid, intuitive, and obsessive" creating extremely "detailed and meticulous" images and software that can take "months to compose."

== Major commissions ==
In 2014, Swiss Institute commissioned, A*, from Robak for the exhibition, The Saint Petersburg Paradox.

In 2016, Public Art Fund commissioned, Liquid Demo for the 117-by-56-foot, 360 degree LED screen in the Oculus at Barclays Center, for the exhibition, Commercial Break.

In 2017, Robak was commissioned by Microsoft to create an artwork for the 40-foot screen on the façade of their flagship store on 5th Avenue.

The National Gallery of Victoria commissioned an 80 screen video installation from Robak for the museum’s 2020 Triennial.

In 2021, Hyundai and Rhizome commissioned Butterfly Room: Special Edition for the 50-foot LED video wall at Hyundai Motorstudio in Seoul, South Korea.

== Collections ==
Robak’s work is currently held in the following public collections:

- AkzoNobel Art Foundation, Amsterdam, Netherlands
- Albright-Knox Art Gallery, Buffalo, NY
- Alfond Collection of Contemporary Art at Rollins College at the Cornell Fine Arts Museum, Winter Park, Florida
- DESTE Foundation for Contemporary Art, Athens, Greece
- Fondazione Sandretto Re Rebaudengo, Turin, Italy
- KRC Collection, Amsterdam, Netherlands
- Metropolitan Museum of Art, New York, NY
- Migros Museum für Gegenwartskunst, Zürich, Switzerland
- Museum of Modern Art, New York, NY
- National Gallery of Victoria, Melbourne, Australia
- Serpentine Galleries, London, UK
- Whitney Museum of American Art, New York, NY
- Yuz Foundation, Jakarta, Indonesia

== Exhibitions (selection) ==
2014

- Pablo’s Birthday, New York, NY, LIKENEWLANDSCAPE
- Galerie Andreas Huber, Vienna, Austria, Instrumental Assistance (curated by Kristina Scepanski)
- Upstream Gallery, Amsterdam, the Netherlands, Shifting Optics Barbican Centre, London, UK, Digital Revolution
- Swiss Institute Contemporary Art, New York, NY, The St. Petersburg Paradox (curated by Simon Castets)
- Kunsthalle Düsseldorf, Düsseldorf, Germany, Smart New World (curated by Elodie Evers and Magdalena Holzhey)

2015

- Team Gallery, New York, NY, Fake Shrimp (solo)
- Serpentine Galleries, London, UK, Special Projects: Drinking Bird (Seasons) 2nd Beijing Photo Biennial, CAFA Art Museum, Beijing, China, Unfamiliar Asia

(selected by Yuko Hasegawa)

- Pavillon de l’Arsenal, Paris, France, Artists and Architecture

Migros Museum, Zurich, Switzerland, Toys Redux - On Play and Critique (curated by Raphael Gygax & Judith Welter)

- Kunsthalle zu Kiel, Kiel, Germany, Playing Future (curated by Dörte Zbikowski)
- Max Hetzler Gallery, Berlin, Germany, Open Source: Art at the Eclipse of Capitalism

(curated by Lisa Schiff, Leslie Fritz and Eugenio Re Rebaudengo)

- Ellis King, Dublin, Ireland, Constructed Culture Sounds Like Conculture (curated by Samuel Leuenberger)
- Albright-Knox Art Gallery, Buffalo, NY, Screen Play: Life in an Animated World Artuner, Palazzo Capris, Turin, Italy, Michael Armitage, Paul Kneale, Tabor Robak

(curated by Eugenio Re Rebaudengo)

2016

- Johan Berggren Gallery, Malmö, Sweden, Sunflower Seed (solo)
- Team (bungalow), Los Angeles, CA, Sunflower Seed (solo)
- Yuz Museum Shanghai, Shanghai, China, OVERPOP: New Art from Yuz Collection and beyond (Curated by Jeffrey Deitch & Karen Smith)
- Museum of Contemporary Art Tokyo, Tokyo, Japan, Tokyo Remix: Creative Power from the Metropolis

2017

- Team Gallery, New York, NY, Quantaspectra (solo)
- Microsoft Culture Wall, New York, NY, Sundial (solo)
- Berggruen Gallery, San Francisco, California, Botanica (curated by Todd von Ammon)
- Barclays Center, Brooklyn, NY, Public Art Fund: Commercial Break
- Museum of Art, Architecture and Technology, Lisbon, Portugal, Utopia/Dystopia
- Kunsthal Rotterdam, Rotterdam, The Netherlands, Human/Digital: A Symbiotic Love Affair
- University of Louisville, Louisville, KY, Painting in the Network: Algorithm and Appropriation

2018

- Museum of Contemporary Art, Chicago, I Was Raised on the Internet (curated by Omar Kholeif)
- Upstream Gallery, Amsterdam, Live and Let Live
- ARCOmadrid, Madrid, Spain, Ryan McGinley and Tabor Robak Golinelli Art and Science Center, Bologna, Italy, UNPREDICTABLE

2019

- Upstream Gallery, Amsterdam, FlatEarth.io (solo)
- Von Ammon Co, Washington D.C, Mental (solo)
- Jeffrey Deitch & Gagosian Gallery, Miami Beach, The Extreme Present
- Von Ammon Co, Washington, Focus Group
- Akron Art Museum, Ohio, Open World: Video Games & Contemporary Art
- Somerset House, Crossing the Borders of Photography
- Museum of Modern Art, New York, New Order: Art and Technology in the 21st Century (curated by Michelle Kuo)

2021

- AkzoNobel Art Foundation, Amsterdam, Netherlands, Reflections beyond the Surface
- Oklahoma Contemporary, Oklahoma City, Oklahoma, Open World: Video Games & Contemporary Art
- Rhizome/Hyundai Motorstudio Seoul, Seoul, South Korea, World on a Wire (curated by Michael Connor)
- Fotomuseum Winterthur, Winterthur, Switzerland, How to Win at Photography2020
- MoCA Westport, Westport, Connecticut, World Peace (curated by Todd von Ammon
- Ars Electronica/König Galerie, Linz, Austria, Better Off Online (curated by Anika Meier)
- Sharjah Art Foundation, Sharjah, United Arab Emirates, Art in the Age of Anxiety (curated by Omar Kholeif)
- Currier Museum of Art, Manchester, New Hampshire, Open World: Video Games & Contemporary Art (curated by Theresa Bembnister)

2022

- Super Dakota, Brussels, Belgium, Liquid Life
- La Venaria Reale, Venaria Reale, Italy, Play - Video Game Art and Beyond
- The Photographers' Gallery, London, UK, How to Win at Photography

2023

- CODA Museum, Apeldoorn, Netherlands, Behind The Screens
