= Team Gallery =

Art gallery in New York City

Coordinates: 40.72170°N 74.00250°W

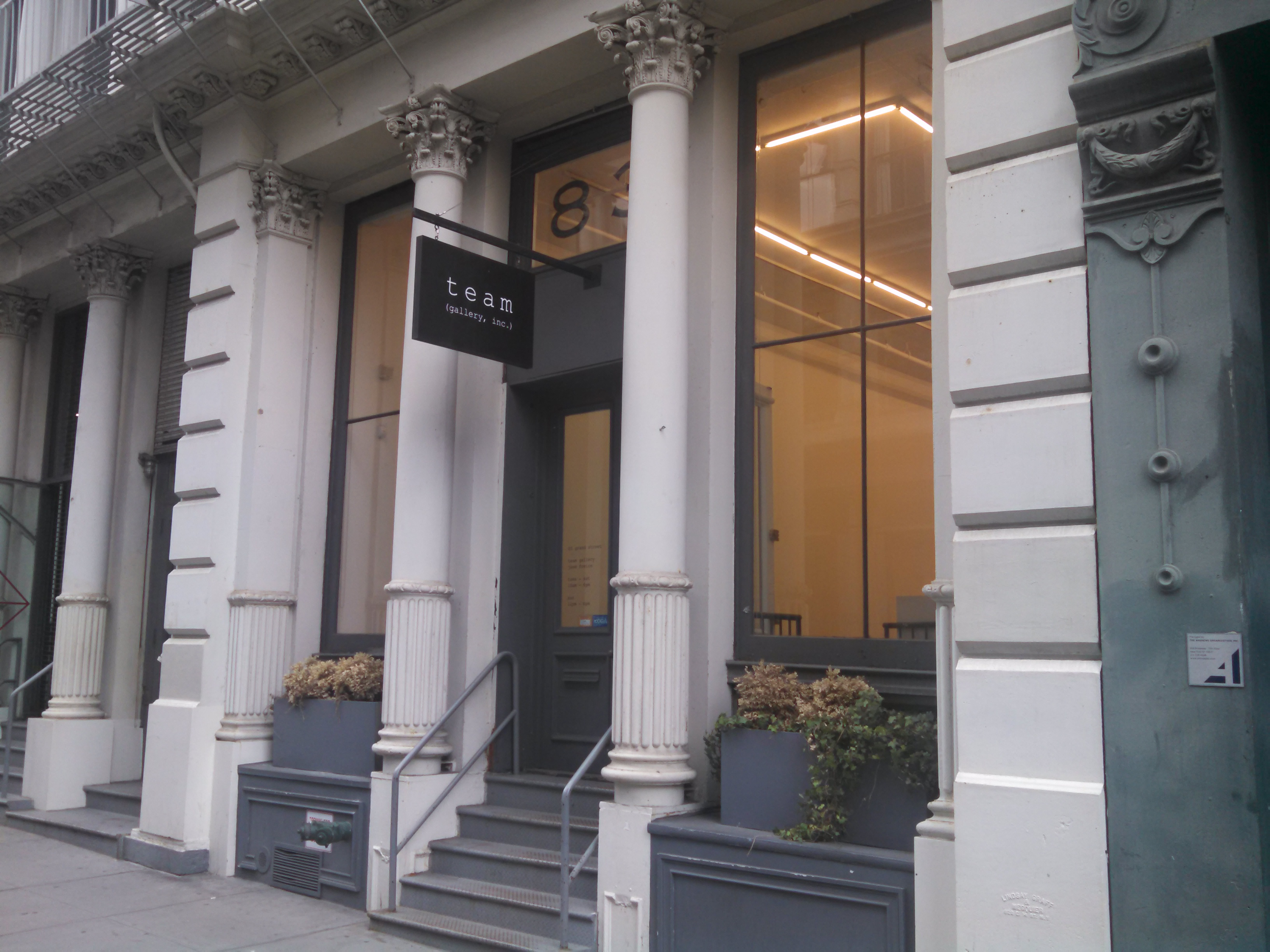
Team Gallery

Team Gallery was a contemporary art gallery located in the SoHo neighborhood of New York City, with an additional project space in Venice, Los Angeles, California. It was founded by José Freire and Lisa Ruyter in 1996. Team represented such artists as Ryan McGinley, Banks Violette, Cory Arcangel, Sam McKinniss, and Gardar Eide Einarsson.

Artnet news reported that Team Gallery closed permanently in 2020.

== History ==
Team was founded by José Freire and artist Lisa Ruyter in 1996. The gallery moved from Chelsea to SoHo in 2006 and opened a second space in the same neighborhood in 2011. In November 2014, Team opened an outpost in Venice, Los Angeles, California, in a domestic space, christened Team Bungalow.

Team placed an especial emphasis on artists focused on counterculture and radical politics – such as Gardar Eide Einarsson, Santiago Sierra, Banks Violette and Egan Frantz – as well as artists working in new media such as Cory Arcangel, Parker Ito, Tabor Robak and Eva & Franco Mattes.

Freire was the gallery's chief executive officer and director from 2001.

== Articles ==
- Review of Vlassis Caniaris’s ‘Sculptures 1973–74’ The New York Times, October 6, 2011.
- New York Times review of Ryan McGinley’s ‘Everyone Knows This Is Nowhere’ and Catherine Opie’s ‘Girlfriends’ The New York Times, April 13, 2010.
- Art Info on the announcement of the opening of Team’s second location “Art Info”, October 20, 2010.
- The L Magazine on Ryan McGinley’s ‘Everyone Knows This is Nowhere’ The L Magazine, March 19, 2010.
