= Warn-U =

EP by Ayshay
- Released: 26 September 2011
- Genre: A cappella; worship music; tone poem; ambient
- Length: 22:22
- Label: Tri Angle
- Producer: Fatima Al Qadiri

Ayshay chronology
Warn-U (2011)	Genre-Specific Xperience (2011)

Singles from Warn-U
- 1. "Warn-U" Released: 25 August 2011

Warn-U (stylized WARN-U) is the debut extended play of Kuwait musician Fatima Al Qadiri, released in September 2011 by the label Tri Angle. It was a part of her project Ayshay, which intended to reinterpret Islamic worship music. The EP only consists of Qadiri's falsetto vocals that are processed and altered to create other types of electronic sounds. The EP consists of three original tracks and a "megamix" of all of them by production duo Nguzunguzu.

== Composition ==
Music of the Ayshay project is Fatima Al Qadiri's reinterpretation of Islamic worship music, and the name Ayshay is "whatever" in Arabic. Warn-U is a tone poem touching on genres such as krautrock, proto-techno, and hypnagogic pop and only consisting of Qadiri's own falsetto vocals, which are pitch-shifted, time-stretched and layered on top of each other. Warn-U garnered comparisons by critics to Björk's album Medúlla (2004) as well as the works of Julianna Barwick.

The official press release from Qadiri's website states that the voices execute a "dizzying array of mixed, sometimes indefinable emotions," sounding "menacing and yet strangely comforting" and "ancient and bizarrely futuristic." Even Qadiri admitted she didn't know how to feel when she listened to Warn-U, "and in many regards I hope I never can." Paul Lester of The Guardian analyzed the vocals are altered to the point of sounding like electronic instruments rather than human voices. The EP closes with Los Angeles production duo Nguzunguzu's twelve-minute "megamix," or "remix suite," of all the record's original tracks. The remix adds tribal Roland 808-style drums to the songs and what The Monitors described as "richer samples and effects."

== Release and promotion ==
On 28 February 2011, a music video for Warn-U's title track was released and depicts was Dave Segal of The Stranger described as "feathery gothic dread, strange architecture, kinetic geometric shapes, mystique-laden figures, fisheye lens shots of an elevator, and, most importantly, luscious lips." On 25 July 2011, Nguzunguzu's remix of the EP's title song was released. An MP3 download for the title track was released on 25 August 2011, and the EP was finally issued on compact disc, digital format, and vinyl on 26 September 2011.

== Critical reception ==
Professional ratings
Review scores
Source	Rating
Pitchfork	7.2/10

Lester wrote in a piece for The Guardian, "We should WARN-U: this music will reverberate in your brain and resonate in your mind's eye long after it's over." A writer for The Monitors called it "another interesting release from the label that keeps on giving, delivering an album that any open minded electronica fan should definitely invest in." However, he opined that "the didgeridoo sounding vocal effect gets a little grating sometimes, while the free form nature of the tracks may also sound dragging at times." In a review of the EP for Pitchfork, Colly similarly wrote that, "while at times beautiful and certainly inventive, WARN-U is somewhat one-note, and it can be difficult to differentiate between the three short original tracks. It's also free-form to the degree that it can sometimes be difficult to engage with." Both Colly and The Monitors were the most favorable towards Nguzunguzu's megamix of Warn-U, Colly writing, "this is where WARN-U is most accessible and arguably most enjoyable, since the addition of structure helps bring Al Qadiri's more avant-garde leanings back toward earth."

== Track listing ==
Derived from Warn-U.

No.	Title	Length
1.	"Warn-U"	2:49
2.	"Shaytan"	4:51
3.	"Jemsheed"	2:32
4.	"Warn-U" (Nguzunguzu Megamix)	12:10
Total length:		22:22

== Personnel ==
Derived from the liner notes of Warn-U.

- Written and produced by Fatima Al Qadiri
- Mixed by Matt Boynton
- Mastered by Rob Laakso at Vacation Island in Brooklyn, New York
- Artwork by David Toro
- Artwork photography by Winona Barton-Ballentine

== Release history ==
Region	Date	Format(s)	Label
Worldwide	26 September 2011	CD; digital download; vinyl	Tri Angle
