= Thuraya Al-Baqsami =

Kuwaiti artist

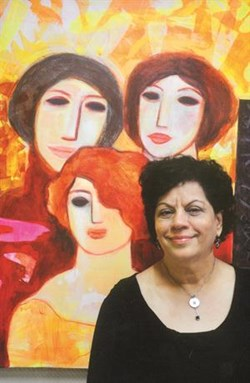
- Born: 1952 (age 73–74); Kuwait

Thuraya Al-Baqsami (born 1952) is a Kuwaiti artist, writer, and internationally acclaimed printmaker. She was born into a Kuwaiti family of Iranian descent. Her daughters are Fatima Al Qadiri and Monira Al Qadiri. In 2002, the Kuwaiti Embassy in Berlin asked Thuraya Al-Baqsami to design the United Buddy Bear for her home country, Kuwait.

In 2026, Al-Baqsami took part in Between Mist and Meridian, a group exhibition at Hafez Gallery in Jeddah, Saudi Arabia, alongside Yemeni painter Hakim Al-Akel and Saudi artist Abdelsattar Al-Mussa, running from 30 June to 1 August 2026.
