= Banks Violette =

American artist

- Born: October 10, 1973 (age 53); Ithaca, New York
- Education: School of Visual Arts, Columbia University
- Known for: Sculpture, Installation art

Banks Violette (born October 10, 1973) is an American visual artist based in Ithaca, New York. He is best known for large-scale, monochromatic sculptures and installations made from industrial materials. His practice often references real-life events and metal and punk subcultures through refined form. Violette’s work has been shown at art institutions and is held in permanent collections around the world.

== Biography ==
Violette was born in Ithaca, New York on October 10, 1973. He worked as a tattoo artist while obtaining his G.E.D. and then attended Tompkins Cortland Community College before studying at the School of Visual Arts in New York, earning a BFA in 1998. He graduated with an MFA from Columbia University in 2000. He was based in Brooklyn during the 2000s. After a period of high activity and success, he returned to Ithaca around 2012 and stopped exhibiting new work for six years.

== Work ==
=== Materials and style ===
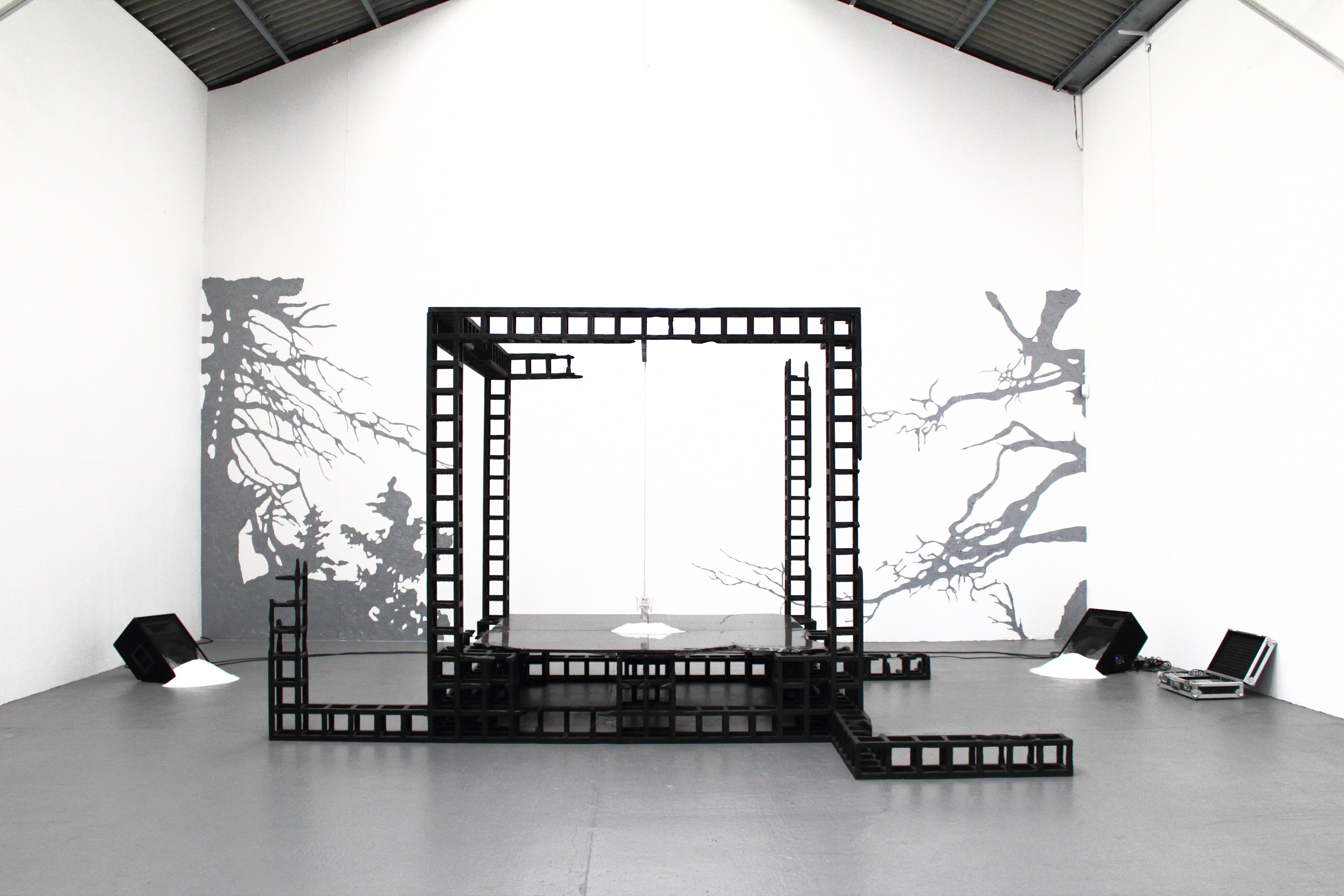
Voidhanger (Twin Channel). All Tomorrows Graves, 2006

While Banks Violette is best known for his large-scale sculptures and installations, his practice also encompasses graphite drawings. He often employs industrial materials and fabrication. His work is characterized by primarily monochromatic palettes combined with distinctive and highly controlled surfaces that are typically glossy, polished, reflective, and sometimes damaged. Violette's sculpture and installation work often incorporates scaffolding-like structures, exposed frameworks, stage-like elements, lighting, and a sense of constructed environments.

=== Themes and influences ===
Violette is influenced by Minimalism and Post-Minimalism. His work has been linked to artists including Donald Judd, Dan Flavin, and Robert Smithson. It has been described by Francesca Gavin as New Gothic Art. Recurring forms include architectural ruins such as churches, fluorescent lighting, and destroyed instruments. Recurring subjects include violence, death, and pathological behavior. He refers to real crimes and ritualized violence through indirect narrative devices such as relics, traces, and aftermath, rather than depicting them explicitly. His work has been described as memorial-like, often structured like true-crime fragments. Violette engages with concepts of entropy, instability, decay, and collapse, while examining slippage between fiction, belief, and real-world action. He creates tension between disturbing subject matter and refined form. He draws on punk and black metal iconography as source material. In addition, his work has been associated with film noir aesthetics, especially darkness, shadow, and low-key lighting. Despite the disturbing implications of Violette’s themes, some have described the tone as cold, detached, restrained, and impassive.

== Major works and exhibitions ==
Violette's work has been shown internationally. Major exhibitions include the Whitney Biennial in 2004, a solo show at the Whitney Museum of American Art in 2005, as well as exhibitions at Schirn Kunsthalle Frankfurt, Museum Boijmans van Beuningen, and the Migros Museum in Zurich. He participated in the "Greater New York" exhibition at MoMA PS1 in 2005 and the 2006 "USA Today" exhibition at the Royal Academy in London. He held a solo exhibition at the Museum of Contemporary Art Connecticut titled "American Standard" from March 15 to June 15, 2025.

For his first solo museum exhibition at the Whitney Museum of American Art in New York City from May 27 to October 2, 2005, Violette erected a recreation of a burned-out church on a black stage. The work was inspired by an image from the cover of black metal band Burzum's Aske EP (1993). It was further influenced by real-life events within the Norwegian black metal scene, such as a series of arson attacks on churches as well as violence including murders.

For Steven Parrino / FTW (Dark Matter), 2006, oil enamel on canvas, 59 x 134 inches (149.86 x 340.36 cm)

In 2006, Violette curated a group show titled War on 45 / My Mirrors are Painted Black (For You). The show included a painting titled For Steven Parrino / FTW (Dark Matter) produced by Violette in collaboration with Gardar Eide Einarsson and dedicated to artist Steven Parrino.

== Collaborations ==
Violette frequently uses collaboration in the development of his installations. Stephen O'Malley of Sunn O))) provided the soundtrack for Violette's 2007 double show at Team Gallery and Gladstone Gallery in New York City.

Violette collaborated with Celine under creative director Hedi Slimane for the Fall/Winter 2022 menswear collection. In 2023, he created a series of fluorescent chandelier works for the brand.

== Collections ==
Violette's work is held in the collections of the Museum of Modern Art, the Solomon R. Guggenheim Museum, the Whitney Museum of American Art, the Los Angeles County Museum of Art, the Centre Pompidou, the Musée d’Art Moderne et Contemporain in Geneva, and the Migros Museum für Gegenwartskunst in Zurich.
