= Brute (album) =

Studio album by Fatima Al Qadiri
- Released: 4 March 2016
- Genre: Protest music; grime; dark ambient; electronica; experimental; minimal
- Length: 36:19
- Label: Hyperdub
- Producer: Fatima Al Qadiri

Fatima Al Qadiri chronology
| Asiatisch (2014) | Brute (2016) | Shaneera (2017) |

Singles from Brute
- 1. "Battery" Released: 20 January 2016; 2. "Power" Released: 23 February 2016

Brute is the second studio album of Kuwait musician Fatima Al Qadiri. A protest album inspired by events such as the 2015 Baltimore protests and the Ferguson unrest, the album regards the authoritarian power of law enforcement in the United States and the illusion of democracy existing in the western part of the world. Its cover art by Josh Kline, Babok Radboy, and Joerg Lohse is a photograph of one of the "police teletubbies" found in Kline's art piece "Freedom," which was intended to present how civil rights were being destroyed in the 21st century. Brute features samples of the Ferguson protest, an MSNBC report of Occupy Wall Street by Lawrence O'Donnell, and an interview with a former member of the LAPD regarding the power of the police.

Released by Hyperdub in March 2016, Brute garnered significant media coverage for its unique political message and was listed in the "Top Ten Protest Albums Of 2016" by Shadowproof, where Kevin Gosztola described it as "the kind of album that will carry even more resonance in the era of President Donald Trump." However, some critics with more mixed opinions towards the album called it too similar to Qadiri's previous releases and found many of the songs too formless.

== History ==
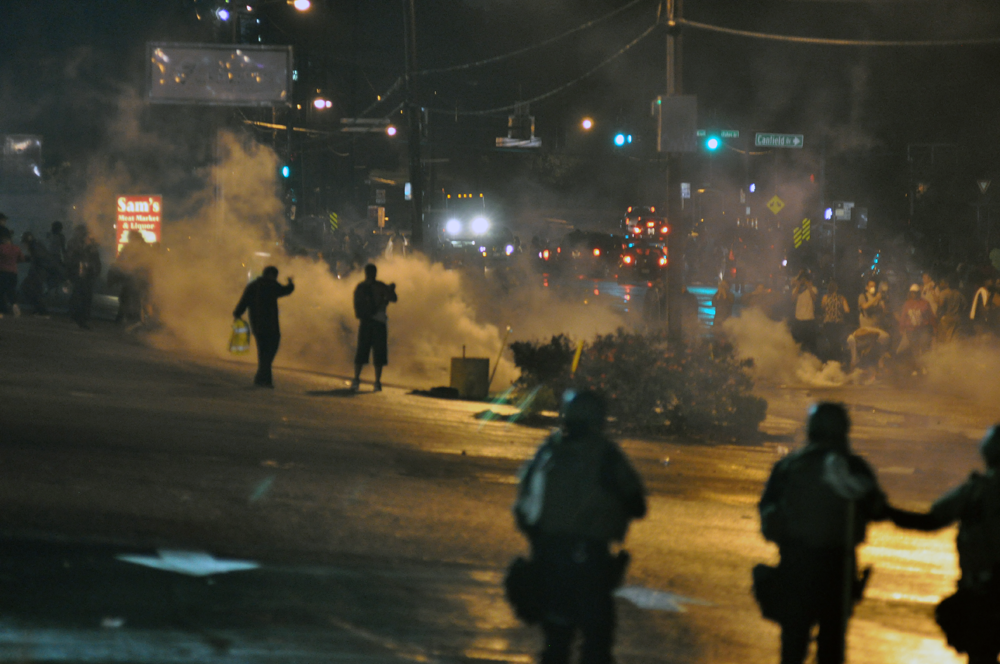
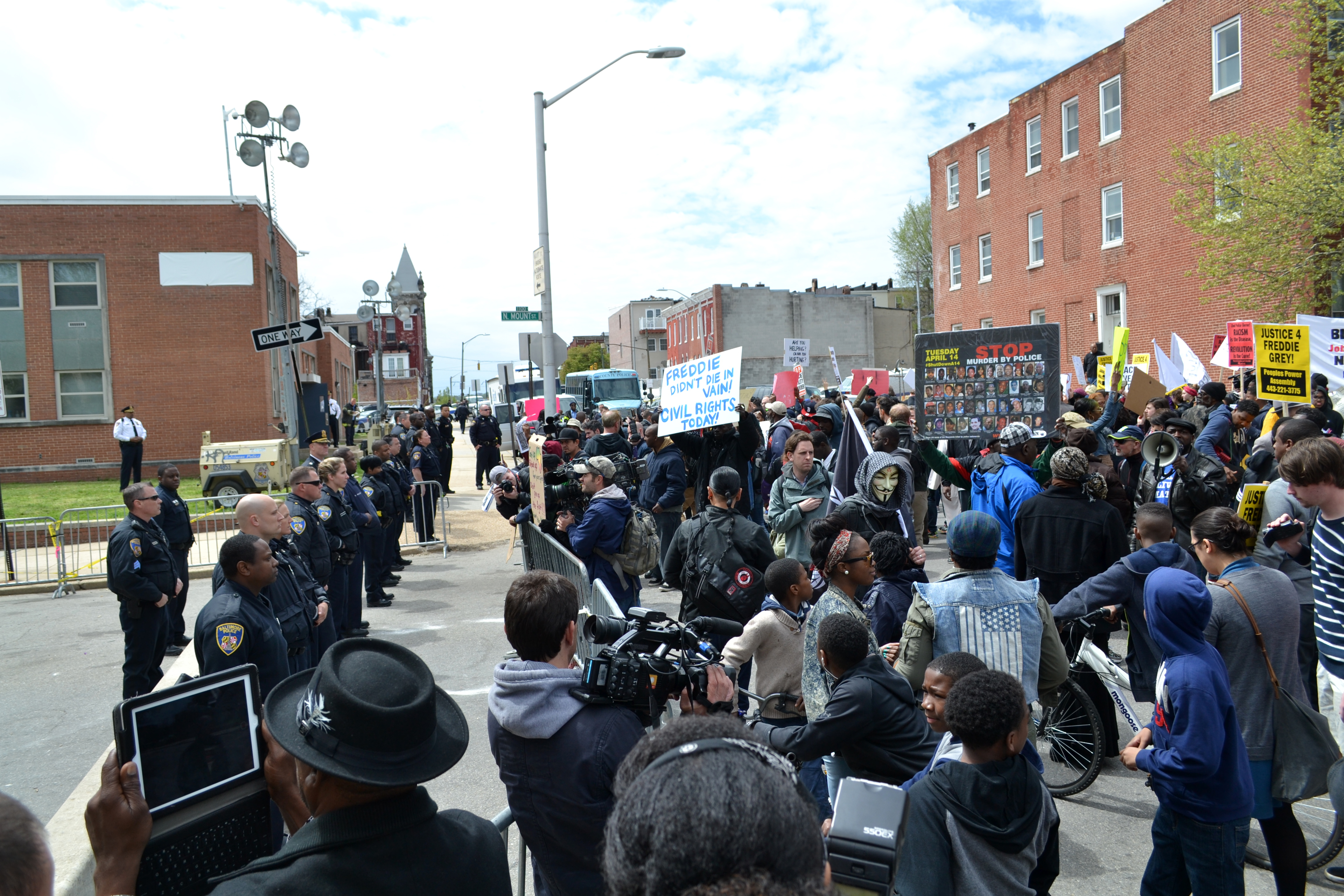
Events such as the Ferguson unrest (left) and the Baltimore protests (right) inspired Fatima Al Qadiri to make a protest record.

Qadiri's experience of having her civil rights violated came from living in Kuwait during its invasion by Iraqi forces in 1990. It wasn't until she attended college that she moved to the United States. As she discussed how she viewed the nation before she relocated there, "I thought America was kind of like Saved By The Bell and Fresh Prince of Bel Air. I'd never set foot there before going to college, and my perception of it was very far removed from the truth, you know? I was just consuming American TV shows like any other kid around the world, thinking, "Oh, it looks so cute." In terms of experience in protesting, Qadiri was at a counterdemonstration at a 1999 IMF World Bank meeting: "I have never seen more cops in my entire life. There were cops on horses, on bicycles, on bikes, in cars, and helicopters. I had a very rude awakening; the illusions of American democracy were destroyed almost immediately." She was also involved in the New York City protests against the 2003 invasion of Iraq.

Qadiri began writing her second album around February/March 2015 while having to be a room in her Kuwait home due to a knee injury. She was looking at a "horrific news cycle" on Twitter, being "moved" by seeing protests going on in places such as Ferguson and Baltimore. This inspired Qadiri to make a record about protesting halfway into writing her next record. As she explained in a Thump interview, "I also saw it as a challenge. Protest music is a real genre, and there have been a lot of seminal protest records. I just feel like this is a subject that's moving a lot of people right now." The first track completed for the album was "Blood Moon," the last "Oubliette." On 20 January 2016, it was announced that Brute would be released on 4 March 2016 and "Battery" was issued as the lead single. On 23 February 2016, Mixmag held a Q&A with Brown and premiered the track "Power." Hyperdub officially released the album on 4 March 2016.

== Concept ==
Compared by some reviewers to Hyperdub founder Kode9's album Nothing (2015) and his pieces about sonic warfare such as Sonic Warfare: Sound, Affect, and the Ecology of Fear (2009), Brute deals with themes of neoliberal fascism, authoritarianism, the rising power of the law enforcement system in the United States, and how democracy in the western part of the world is just a mirage. Qadiri described it as a record in the vein of What's Going On (1971) by Marvin Gaye but also explained that it wasn't really a protest record: “It’s a meditation, but a very unpleasant one. Protest music is a call-to-action, and this is not a call-to-action because I don’t know what the action should be. I’m not offering any solutions, just saying that this is the reality.” Qadiri said that she titled the album Brute as a "counterpoint to the word thug, and how people over the last two years have been speaking about thugs in the media." She also reasoned that the word "contains a lot of savagery, but also, in English, it has a dandyish, almost 1950s-ish sense."

== Composition and sound design ==
"[Qadiri] is less a beat maker, more a builder of atmospheric soundscapes, twisting choral harmonies with grime bass lines and doomy dubstep effects. Her conceptual sounds don’t offer blatant, fist pumping anthems for movements like Occupy and Black Lives Matter, instead they seem to capture the still, quiet tension that echoes around that space between the battle lines and point to the psychological fear on both sides."

— Kevin Irwin of The Line of Best Fit

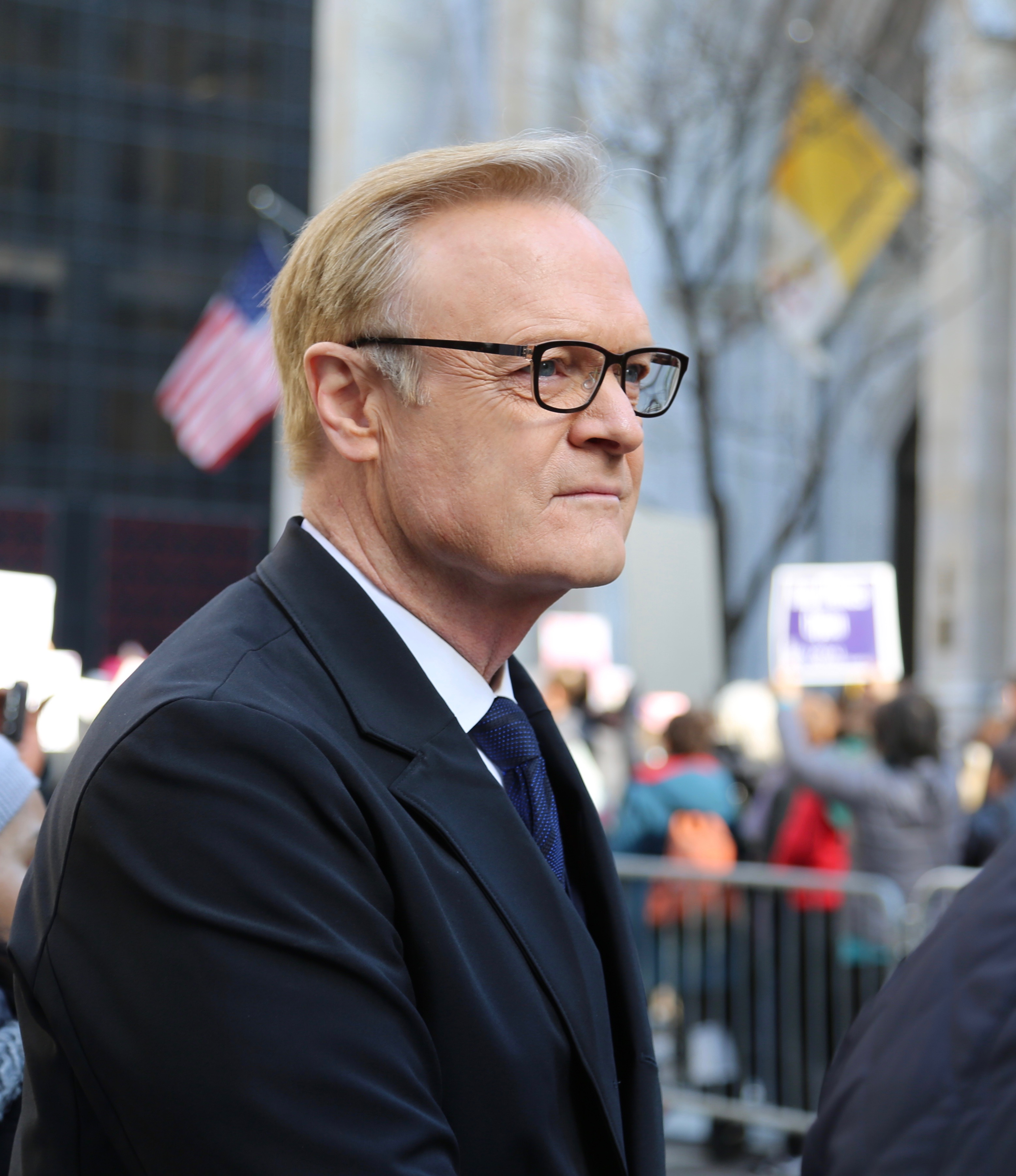
Lawrence O'Donnell's MSNBC report on Occupy Wall Street appears on Brute.

Now critic Kevin Ritchie wrote that Brute has a minimal structure that "sometimes ris[es] in urgency before falling into a deceptive calm." Brute is the most grime-infused LP in Qadiri's discography, where signature sounds of the genre such as gunshot-like percussion, swirling melodies, and police siren sound effects are heard many times throughout. Joseph Burnett of Dusted found it unlike most other grime music in that it is "rarely propulsive or tailored for the dancefloor, but rather shift and shake convulsively under the weight of stark, metronomic beats, swathes of sub-bass and icy synth swirls." As AllMusic journalist Andy Kellman wrote, Brute uses a combination of real and simulated representations of protests that gives it a surreal feal.

Because of its themes regarding powerful law enforcement, Brute has a hopeless tone coming from its use of what Jake Hulyer labeled as a "cold and stark" structure with an "unwelcoming atmosphere:" audio snippets of political rallies, minor chord structures, synthesized horns and choirs, and what Lhooq described as "apocalyptic bass growls." While Brute is based on an American topic, Qadiri wanted to make the instrumentals "universal" for listeners from other nations across the globe to resonate with it. Brute's oppressive vibe comes from the drum parts, specifically how the "rhythms jerk at unnatural angles" and "beats drop like gas canisters," wrote Stephen Worthy of Mixmag. As Derek Staples of Consequence of Sound wrote, "an ever-lurking, low-end wake" is used to represent an omnipresent police force on songs like “Battery” and “10-34," "volatile harmonic breaks signifying the frequent outbursts of unmitigated violence."

There are very few glimpses of a hopeful vibe on the album, such as the electronic harps on the song "Fragmentation." As Burnett wrote, "Listen carefully, and there is a certain melodicism nestled in the heart of this album, but its tone is despairing and subdued, glimmers of light in a dark and uncaring world." Burnett suggested that the reason for this was to show the "uncaring, uncomprehending barrier that has been erected between authority and the demos, between the powerful and the rest of us."

Brute primarily uses three audio sources, which Qadiri garnered via YouTube. One of them is a live recording of the Ferguson protests where a policeman says "you are no longer peacefully assembling" through a Long Range Acoustic Device, which is played over an industrial instrumental on the opening track "Endzone." Another one is Lawrence O'Donnell's MSNBC report about Occupy Wall Street, which Qadiri chose for his "classic American media news anchor voice," which is played on the track "Blows." It is filtered in reverb and "half-shrouded" in synthesizers to put the listener far away from what's really going, wrote Rory Gibb of The Quietus. Another one of these samples is an interview with a former LAPD sergeant named Cheryl Dorsey about the power of police officers which plays on the LP's closer "Power" over synthesized glass-breaking sounds. The samples are used at a minimum "just to illustrate the context, to set the tone," Qadiri explained.

== Cover art ==
In early 2015, American artist Josh Kline produced an installation titled "Freedom" at the New Museum in New York. It centers on four "Police Teletubbies" in SWAT gear that block an area modeled after Zuccotti Park, the location of the Occupy Wall Street protests. The art piece was meant to showcase how civil rights were being destroyed in the 21st century and uses Qadiri's cover of "The Star-Spangled Banner." The cover art for Brute consists of a photograph of one of the teletubbies altered by Babak Radboy to give it face hair, broken blood vessels, and chapped lips. Qadiri explained, "He Frankensteined it. He gave it life. He took something that was an object, and made it into a living, breathing monster." Writer Patrick Hinton put the cover art in his gallery for Mixmag of "The best record artwork of 2016."

== Critical reception ==
Professional ratings
Aggregate scores
| Source | Rating |
|---|---|
| AnyDecentMusic? | 6.9/10 |
| Metacritic | 73/100 |
Review scores
| Source | Rating |
| AllMusic | 3.5/5 stars |
| Clash | 8/10 |
| Consequence of Sound | B |
| The Guardian | 2/5 stars |
| Mixmag | 9/10 |
| Mojo | 4/5 stars |
| Now | 3/5 Ns |
| Pitchfork | 7.3/10 |
| Q | 3/5 stars |
| Resident Advisor | 2.5/5 |

Brute garnered a significant amount of media coverage that focused on as well as honored its political theme, Thump calling it "the Powerful Political Album We've Been Waiting For." Writing for Hyperallergic, Cynthia Cruz stated, "Like great poetry, her music provides just the right amount of world and politics with her references to protests, news clips and police force while allowing the listener enough space within each song and within the album to make her own connections." Shadowproof ran a list by Kevin Gosztola titled the "Top Ten Protest Albums Of 2016," where Brute was included. Gosztola summarized that it was "the kind of album that will carry even more resonance in the era of President Donald Trump," while in a review of the record for Clash magazine, Sofia Leadbetter stated, "Al Qadiri has invoked her own personal brand of protest in a world in which discussion over that right has become ever more charged." In a nine-out-of-ten review for Mixmag, Worthy favorably compared the record to the works of Laurie Anderson as a "doyenne of experimental electronica."

In a review for Consequence of Sound, Staples discussed the LP's ideas in relation to the Republican debates that were going on shortly before the 2016 United States presidential election; he praised the LP for mostly being an instrumental record, reasoning that her choice of not having any vocalist sing words show that "Al Qadiri has an acute awareness of human communication and the subtle impact of its many non-spoken factors." Gibb's review of Brute discussed how Qadiri used tropes from popular music styles in all of her works, opining that "the overt narrative framings of Brute [and her previous LP Asiatisch (2014)] highlight the way Al Qadiri's work seeks to create collages of themes — a bricolage approach that’s effective in bringing together ideas and allowing them to interact, even if the musical results aren't always as successful." He wrote that "the moments when Brute really comes to life are those when it leaves overt references behind and heads towards starker and more emotionally ambiguous places."

A common criticism in more mixed reviews of Brute were towards it not being different enough from previous releases by Qadiri as well as most of the tracks being too formless. In a review for Pitchfork, Kevin Lozano called it a "frustrating mish-mosh of middling and artful." He highlighted its unique concept and felt the tracks that used samples were the best on the record; however, he also opined that most of the other songs were "shapeless tracks" that had too many elements borrowed from Qadiri's past releases. Resident Advisor's Andrew Ryce wrote that most of the LP's samples were its only parts that distinguished it from previous releases: "Otherwise, we're given titles like "10-34" and "Oubliette," words that gesture towards a theme without providing substance." A reviewer for musicOMH called it a "frustrating album" and a "missed opportunity," writing that it "has the ability to unnerve and unsettle to the point of creating a paranoid world for the listener" but too much of the songs are "formless pieces that drift instead of acting as a counterpoint to the oppression that lets Brute down."

Ben Beaumont-Thomas of The Guardian praised the political theme as "bracing" but opined that the album wasn't "enjoyable to listen to" due to its "limp compositions" and use of sounds like Fairlight CMI-esque voices and "ultra-synthetic" drums that became a cliche in underground electronic music due to the popularity of works by acts such as Oneohtrix Point Never and Visionist. Daniel Bromfield of Spectrum Culture described the album, despite its concept, as "actually pretty, almost pastoral" and joked that it "could just as easily be a concept album about spending a weekend on grandma’s farm." In fact, he went as so far as to say the album was much more enjoyable to listen to without knowing its context: "Taken purely on musical terms, Brute is an excellent album. As a concept album, it’s a flop."

== Track listing ==
Derived from the liner notes of Brute.

| No. | Title | Length |
|---|---|---|
| 1. | "Endzone" | 1:51 |
| 2. | "Blood Moon" | 3:32 |
| 3. | "Breach" | 2:45 |
| 4. | "Curfew" | 2:44 |
| 5. | "Battery" | 2:58 |
| 6. | "10-34" | 2:40 |
| 7. | "Oubliette" | 3:33 |
| 8. | "Blows" | 3:20 |
| 9. | "Aftermath" | 3:56 |
| 10. | "Fragmentation" | 4:10 |
| 11. | "Power" | 4:50 |
| Total length: | | 36:19 |

== Personnel ==
Derived from the liner notes of Brute.

Production

- Written and produced by Fatima Al Qadiri
- Mixed by Chris Tabron at MSR Studios in New York City
- "Endzone," "Blood Moon," "Curfew," "Oubliette," "Blows," "Aftermath," "Fragmentation," and "Power" mastered by Matt Colton at Alchemy Mastering in London
- "Breach," "Battery," and "10-34" mastered by Tom Waltz at Waltz Mastering in Watertown, Massachusetts

Cover art

- Sculpture by Josh Kline
- Photographed by Joerg Lohse
- Art direction by Babak Radboy

== Release history ==
| Region | Date | Format(s) | Label |
|---|---|---|---|
| Worldwide | 4 March 2016 | CD; digital download; vinyl | Ghostly International |
