= Egan Frantz =

American artist

- Born: 1986; Norwalk, Connecticut
- Occupation: Artist
- Known for: Contemporary Art
- Parent(s): Tina Weymouth, Chris Frantz
- Family: Ralph Weymouth, Yann Weymouth, Anatole Le Braz

Egan Frantz (born 1986) is an American artist. He is known for producing large-scale, abstract paintings wherein passages of vivid color stand out sharply against measured visual fields.

Frantz is also the producer and engineer for musical outfit Xeno & Oaklander. Together they have toured North America, Europe and Russia numerous times, performing at festivals and art institutions such as SXSW, SFMoMA, The Kitchen, MoMA PS1, Art Basel, Kunsthalle Zurich, and the New Museum of Contemporary Art. Frantz and the group share a music and art studio in Connecticut. His parents are Talking Heads founding members and Tom Tom Club members Chris Frantz and Tina Weymouth.

== Public collections ==
His work is held in the collection of the Henry Art Gallery, University of Seattle, Washington and The Craig Robins Collection, Miami Florida.

== Exhibitions ==
- Galerie Nagel Draxler, Cologne (2024)
- Each Modern, Taipei (2024)
- Lempertz, Brussels (2022)
- Foundry, Seoul (2021)
- Galerie Nagel Draxler, Berlin (2020)
- Team Gallery, New York (2019)
- Neuer Aachener Kunstverein, Aachen (2019)
- Gallery Nagel Draxler, Cologne (2018)
- Roberts Projects, Los Angeles (2017)
- Gallery Nagel Draxler, Berlin (2016)
- Art Basel: Nova, Miami (2015)
- Tilton Gallery, New York (2015)
- Michael Jon Gallery, Miami (2014)
- Galerie Nagel Draxler, Cologne (2014)
- Art Basel: Statements, Basel (2013)
- Roberts & Tilton, Los Angeles (2012)
- Essl Museum, Vienna (2012)
- Tomorrow, Toronto (2012)
- C L E A R I N G, New York (2012)
- Miguel Abreu Gallery, New York (2011)

== Representation ==
- Galerie Nagel Draxler, Berlin / Cologne / Munich
- Each Modern, Taipei
