= Gardar Eide Einarsson =

Norwegian-born artist (born 1976)

- Born: 1976 (age 49–50)
- Known for: Painting

Gardar Eide Einarsson (born January 12, 1976) is a Norwegian-born artist who lives and works in Tokyo and New York City. His work encompasses installation, printmaking, painting and sculpture.

Einarsson participated on a 2006 group show entitled, War on 45 / My Mirrors are Painted Black (For You), which included fellow heavy-metal nihilistic artists. The show included a black rhombus painting entitled For Steven Parrino / FTW (Dark Matter) made by Einarsson, in collaboration with Banks Violette, and dedicated to the influential dead artist Steven Parrino.

For Steven Parrino / FTW (Dark Matter), 2006, oil enamel on canvas, 59 x 134 inches (149.86 x 340.36 cm)

== Education ==
- Einar Granum School of Fine Art, Oslo, 1994–1996
- National Academy of Fine Art, Bergen, 1996-2000
- Staatliche Hochschule fur Fine Arts - Städelschule, Frankfurt am Main, 1999–2000
- Whitney Museum of American Art Independent Study Program, Studio Program, New York, 2001–2002
- Cooper Union School of Architecture, Architecture and Urban Studies Program, New York, 2002–2003
- Whitney Museum of American Art Independent Study Program, 2002–2003

== Public collections ==
- Astrup Fearnley Museum of Modern Art, Oslo, Norway
- Berkeley Art Museum, Berkeley
- Los Angeles County Museum of Art
- Malmo Art Museum, Malmo
- Moderna Museet, Stockholm
- Museum of Contemporary Art, Los Angeles
- Museum of Modern Art, New York
- Norwegian National Museum of Art, Oslo, Norway
- Museum für Moderne Kunst, Frankfurt Am Main, Germany

== Exhibitions ==
=== Solo exhibitions ===
- Flagwaste, TEAM, New York City, New York, 2018
- Rawhide Down, Standard Oslo, Oslo, Norway, 2018
- "SHTF", Team Gallery, Venice, CA, USA, 2016
- "Distinct Functionation Layers Establish Hierarchy and Order", Galleri Nils Staerk, Copenhagen, DK, 2016
- "FREEDOM, MOTHERFUCKER. DO YOU SPEAK IT?", Team Gallery, New York City, USA, 2015
- "A Madman, a Patient, a Condemned Man, a Worker or a Schoolboy", ARoS Aarhus Art Museum, Aarhus, Denmark, 2015
- "Motivation: A Study of Action", Standard Oslo, Oslo, Norway, 2014
- "He likes the fiestas. He likes the music. He likes to dance.", Maureen Paley gallery, London, UK, 2014
- "Sorry If I Got It Wrong, But Something Definitely Isn't Right", Team Gallery, New York City, USA, 2012
- "In The Dust of This Planet", Maureen Paley gallery, London, UK, 2012
- "Art | 42 | Basel | Unlimited", June 2011, Basel, Switzerland, 2011
- "Another Modern Moment Completed", Team Gallery, New York City, USA, 2010
- "Judge", Team Gallery, New York City, USA, 2007
- "Art | 37 | Basel | Statements", Basel, Switzerland, 2006
- "leashed or confined", Team Gallery, New York City, USA, 2005

=== Special projects ===
- Versuchsstation des Weltuntergangs, Bergen Kunsthall, 2013
- Power Has a Fragrance, Kunsthalle Fridericianum, Kassel, 2011
- Power Has a Fragrance, Reykjavik Art Museum, 2011
- Whitney Biennial, Whitney Museum of American Art, New York, 2008
- South of Heaven, Frankfurter Kunstverein, Frankfurt (Germany), 2007

== Residencies ==
- IASPIS, Stockholm, Sweden, 2004
- Künstlerhaus Bethanien, Berlin, Germany, 2002–03
- NIFCA Nordic Institute for Contemporary Art, Suomenlinna, Helsinki, Finland, 2001

== Solo publications ==
- Conservator's Notes, At Last Books, Copenhagen, Denmark, 2018
- The Mess, Karma, New York, USA, 2014
- Stainless Steel/ Fluorescent Pink, Rathole Books, Tokyo, Japan, 2014
- Gardar Eide Einarsson, Versuchsstation Des Weltuntergangs, Bergan Kunsthall, and Sternberg Press, Norway, 2013
- Power Has a Fragrance, Astrup Fearnley Museum of Modern Art, Norway, 2011
- South of Heaven, Revolver, Frankfurt am Main, Germany, 2007

== Catalogues ==
- Kvaran, Gunnar; Ueland, Hanne Beate and Årbu, Grete (ed.): Lights On!, Astrup Fearnley Museum of Modern Art / Skira, Oslo, 2008
- Huldisch, Henriette and Momin, Shamim M.: The Whitney Biennial, Whitney Museum of American Art, New York, USA, 2008
- Einarsson, Gardar Eide and Keller, Christoph: South of Heaven, Revolver Verlag, Frankfurt am Main, Germany, 2007
- Einarsson, Gardar Eide and Keller, Christoph: Long Haired and Freaky People Need Not Apply, Revolver Verlag, Frankfurt am Main, Germany, 2004
- Art For the People, Riksutstillinger, Bergen Kunsthall a.o, Norway, 2003
- CMYK/Greyscale, Tramway, Glasgow, Scotland, 2002
- Strike, Wolverhampton Art Gallery, Wolverhampton, UK, 2002
- Esplanaden, Charlottenborg Exhibition Hall, Copenhagen, Denmark, 2002
- Audit, Casino Luxembourg Forum d’ Art Contemporain, Luxembourg, 2001
- Kosmos, Rooseum Center for Contemporary Art, Malmö, Sweden, 2001
- Osculum Infame, Nordic Institute for Contemporary Art, Helsinki, Iceland, 2001
- Schpaa, Bergen Kunstforening/ Bergen Kunsthall/ Den Frie Udstilling, Copenhagen/
- Bergen, Denmark/Norway, 2001
- Festival Junge Talente, Offenbach am Main, Germany, 2000
- Momentum- Nordic Festival for Contemporary Art, Moss, Norway, 2000

== Published work ==
- Bunch of Motherfuckers: Unfinished Individuation and Meshworks of Equivalence, The Vital Coincidence, Walther Koenig Verlag, Cologne, 2004
- Lars Von Trier, Something is going to happen, Frotté Factory, Oslo, 2004
- You Just Don’t Get it Dad, So Fuck Off, The Academy and the Corporate Public, Permanent Press Verlag, Cologne, 2004
- Hardcore, Self-organization and Alternativity, We Are All Normal- Nordic Artist Writings, NIFCA, Copenhagen/ Helsinki, 2004
- Oh My What A Dazzling Display, The Mock Commodity Fetishism of Klaus Thejl Jacobsen, Galleri Nicolai Wallner Notes on Asskissing & Corporate Strategies of the *RAF, Corporate Mentality, Lukas and Sternberg, New York, 2004
- Total Revolution, True Lies, Pork Salad Press, Copenhagen, 2004
- Rotation a NIFCA Project in Media Space, Nordic Institute for Contemporary Art/Morgenbladet, Oslo/Helsinki, 2001
- Terje Nicolaisen’s Deriving Practice, Terje Nicolaisen, Tegneforbundet, Oslo, 2001
- Billedkunst Magazine, regular critic and member of editorial board Publication Series for Oslo Kunsthall, editor, 2001
- Metronome, Frankfurt/Main a.o., 2000
- UKS Forum For Samtidskunst 1/2 2000, guest editor, 2000
