= Asiatisch =

Studio album by Fatima Al Qadiri
- Released: 5 May 2014
- Genres: Sino grime; future bass; experimental; minimal; vaporwave
- Length: 36:52
- Label: Hyperdub
- Producer: Fatima Al Qadiri

Fatima Al Qadiri chronology
Desert Strike (2012)	Asiatisch (2014)	Brute (2016)

Singles from Brute
- 1. "Szechuan" Released: 19 March 2014; 2. "Shanghai Freeway" Released: 30 April 2014

Asiatisch (German for "Asian") is the debut full-length studio album of Kuwaiti musician Fatima Al Qadiri, released by the label Hyperdub on 5 May 2014. The record is about what Qadiri called "Imagined China," an environment of stereotypes about East Asian nations and respective cultures formed in media of the Western world. Thus, it musically derives from sinogrime, a style of grime music that utilizes elements of East Asian music. In representing Asian stereotypes, the album includes digital traditional Chinese and Japanese-styled drum kits and synth presets alongside "scrambled" ancient Chinese poems. One of the main inspirations for Qadiri producing Asiatisch was the making of a "nonsense Mandarin" a cappella version of the song "Nothing Compares 2 U" that would later be the record's opening track.

Critical reviews of Asiatisch were generally positive, and the album was on numerous year-end lists by publications, such as being number ten on The Wire's list of the best releases of 2014. However, the LP's use of a concept about stereotypes was a frequent criticism; some reviewers felt the concept had little depth or clarity and the record was much more enjoyable to listen when only focusing on its musical aspect, and some writers felt the concept was better executed than the actual quality of the tracks.

== History ==
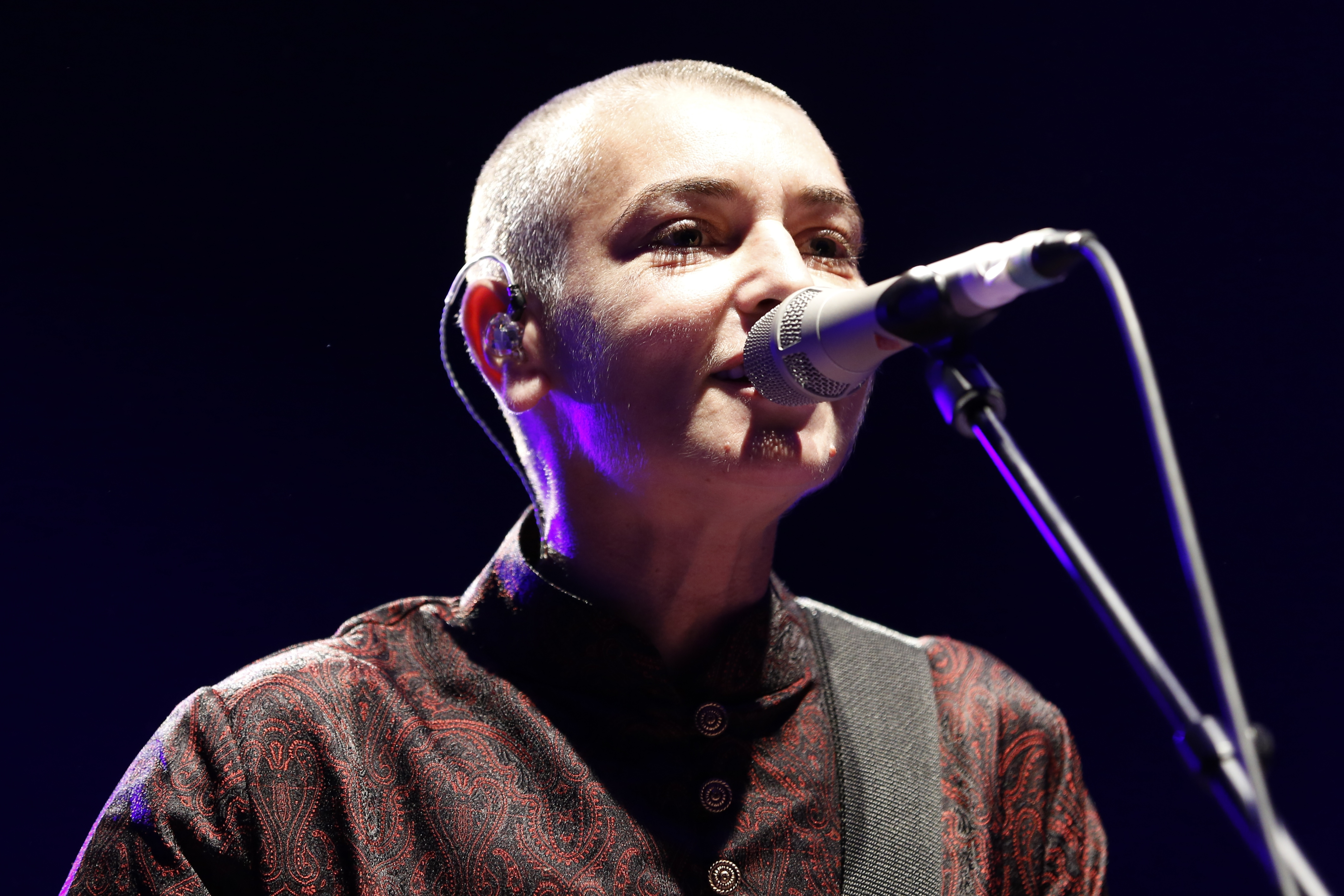
A "nonsense Mandarin" a cappella version of "Nothing Compares 2 U" by Prince is on Asiatisch.

Fatima Al Qadiri was inspired to produce Asiatisch by her experience in a Chinese Literature college class and the making of what would later become the LP's opening track "Shanzhai (For Shanzhai Biennial)." In regards to her time studying in the Chinese college class, Qadiri explained, "Even though it was in translation, even though it was taught in an American university by an American professor... I was fascinated by his method, because he really inserted you in Ancient China. It was like virtual reality poetry or something. I think that was the first (time I was) conscious of something other than the West creating."

In regards to making the album's opener, she was asked by a group of friends in the art trio Shanzhai Biennial to make, in their words, a "cheap, Chinese instrumental" under a "nonsense Mandarin" a capella recording of the song "Nothing Compares 2 U" by Sinéad O'Connor. Recorded by Chinese punk vocalist Helen Feng, the rendition was to be played in a show at MoMA PS1. An instrumental was produced in a manner that did not follow the instructions of the trio, and was not included in the show, but made an appearance as the album's first song; "Shanzhai (For Shanzhai Biennial)." Overall, it took Qadiri around a month and a half to finish Asiatisch. The lead single of the LP, "Szechuan," was issued on 19 March 2014, and its second single, "Shanghai Freeway," premiered on 30 April 2014 via Rookie magazine. The album was released on Hyperdub on 5 May 2014.

== Concept ==
"It's like a garbage tapestry: you don't know what the fabric is; it's not something that's easily identifiable or quantifiable; there's a catalogue of films and cartoons and comic books within it, but one that many authors have contributed to. The Asia in Asiatisch is a nexus of stereotypes that have been perpetrated, elaborated, embellished and weaved, each time further and further dislocated from the original misrepresentation."

— Qadiri on the "Imagined China" of Asiatisch

As Dusted magazine stated, Asiatisch is an "abstract collage of faux Chinese imagery" that executes a "mixture of caricature, dream and stereotype, with very little of anything actually Chinese filtering through." Asiatisch is about what The Guardian journalist Sukhdev Sandhu described as a "themepark simulation" or a "sci-fi wonderland" of China, which Qadiri named "Imagined China." "Imagined China" is an environment of stereotypes about Asian nations and culture that were formed by the Western world, both in education and media formats such as films, literature, animation, comic books, and magazines like The Economist. Qadiri said that "The Asia in Asiatisch is a nexus of stereotypes that have been perpetrated, elaborated, embellished and weaved, each time further and further dislocated from the original misrepresentation." Qadiri also stated that the environment of the album's Chinese setting consists of brutalist architecture: "There's something very dainty and delicate about my melodic compositions, but they are made by digital tools, which also render them clunky, cold."

Some parts of Asiatisch do represent actual Chinese places. "Shenzhen" and "Shanghai Freeway" have sounds that replicate the fast architectural modernization and population growth of China, "Wudang" includes what Andrew Ryce described as "disembodied" voices and synthesizers suggesting myths about the Wudang Mountains, and "Forbidden City" "reconciles its namesake's imperial history with its current status as a glitzy tourist destination," wrote Ryce. The track "Szechuan" is titled after the "colonial" name of the Chinese provence Sichuan, which is used in several Chinese restaurants across the globe. As she described what the song is about, "There’s this idea that Chinese food in China is different than the Chinese food that you find in the West. There’s an illusion—you know what Chinese food tastes like, but then when you go to China, you’re shocked. You come to terms with reality." "Dragon Tattoo" includes a modulated voice saying "speak Chinese, if you please," a response to the line "we are Siamese, if you please" from "The Siamese Cat Song" of Lady and the Tramp (1955).

Writer Elena Harvey Collins labeled Asiatisch's concept as a "reverse[d]" idea of the Chinese slang term "shanzhai," which refers to counterfeit consumer goods produced in China. He explained that the record is about "the ways in which vague notions of China as a cultural monolith and an economic superpower are disseminated through media and how the country acts as the subject of projected of hopes, fears, and dreams in Western culture." Comparing the concept of the album to Edward Said's theories of orientalism, Sandhu stated that Asiatisch is about "nations as mythologies, as fantasies, as erratic aggregations of commerce, junk-media, fabricated fictions." Writer Steph Kretowicz stated the message on Asiatisch is nonsensical in a similar manner to most propaganda.

== Composition ==
The album presents Asian melodies through the lens of a western musical genre, that being grime. Primarily, Asiatisch is a sinogrime album; Hyperdub's Kode9 coined the phrase "sino grime" to describe a style of grime that heavily contained elements of Asian music. The album commentates on the use of Asian melodies in Western music that originated in the era of Looney Tunes shorts and similar media, where leitmotifs were composed to mimic Asian people, most prominently the Oriental riff. The stereotypes of Asian culture are presented via electronically produced voices and drums, and "scrambled" readings of ancient Chinese-language poems on the songs "Loading Beijing," "Wudang," and "Jade Stairs," and the changes in mood "between cheesy, eerie and darkly erotic," wrote Sandhu. Sounds on the album include the "Asian Kit" from Logic Pro and the Asian flute sounds on a Korg M1. As Qadiri explained the scrambled poetry, "Imagined China is a scrambled idea. It's not something that you can easily even encompass in a sentence or two - or three, or four. It's an undertaking."

As Nick Neyland of Pitchfork analyzed, the structures of the instrumentals are "so bare it feels like someone scooped out most of the contents and dumped them out, providing an intriguing counterpoint to the dense flood of thought the record carries on its back": while a fair amount of the record includes "glassy" synth pads, there are also some moments that consist of only little more than bass or trap-style snares. As Neyland wrote, "Journalist Dan Hancox described sinogrime as a subgenre "that barely ever existed", which is fitting because Al Qadiri also makes music that barely exists, to the point where the gaps between notes almost become the songs themselves." A review published in Dusted magazine, give a more specific description of the arrangement of the songs: "Most of the tracks have a sort of lopsided gait, neither propulsive nor minimal but somewhere in-between. The abortive lurches are used as counterpoints to the other sounds, as opposed to building blocks for a foundation. When this is not the case, as on the moody "Shenzhen," the pace is always somewhat sedate, as opposed to the hyperactivity of "regular" grime, as if Al Qadiri is trying to channel a sort of Eastern mysticism."

== Reception ==
Professional ratings
Aggregate scores
Source	Rating
AnyDecentMusic?	7/10
Metacritic	67/100
Review scores
Source	Rating
AllMusic	3/5 stars
The Guardian	4/5 stars
Mojo	4/5 stars
NME	5/10
Now	2/5 Ns
Pitchfork	7.2/10
Q	3/5 stars
Resident Advisor	3.5/5
Spin	8/10
Time Out London	5/5 stars

According to Crack magazine, Asiatisch was "one of underground electronic music’s most intriguing stories of 2014." It received generally positive reviews from professional writers upon its release and was on numerous publication year-end lists, such as landing at number ten on The Wire's list of the best releases of 2014. In terms of dance and electronic album year-end lists, Asiatisch ranked number nine on Rolling Stone's article, while a list piece by Exclaim!, where the LP came in at number ten, stated, "Asiatisch is also an excellently produced album that cleverly mines Hyperdub's short-lived sinogrime subgenre, but its real coup is to remind us how much music, in the right hands, can inspire us to tap into and deconstruct preconceived notions of nationality and culture, all while moving us to tap our fingers." Another piece for Exclaim! written by Vincent Pollard stated, "the most striking aspect of Asiatisch is the confidence of Al Qadiri's sound, demonstrating that the quality of her music has finally caught up with her artistic ambitions."

Asiatisch garnered a five-star review from Time Out London, where Tamar Shlaim honored the record as Qadiri's "most polished and exciting work yet" and "a future bass masterpiece from one of the most exciting producers around." Irish critic Jim Carroll called it a "head-spinning, adventurous and compelling set of sounds spliced and diced to impress." Adam Workman of The National highlighted that it "sounds like little else out there right now," while Lanre Bakare wrote in his review for The Guardian, "With so much theory and style to cut through before you get to the actual music, it's to the album's credit that it often stands up as much more than just a high-brow, Edward Said-inspired thought experiment." Aimee Cliff stated in her review for Fact, "Where the album wins me over completely is in the nuance with which it grabs its subject matter, creating a listen that’s full of open space and calm-before-the-storm moments, allowing personality to play against imitation as Eastern instrumentation plays against a metallic grid of noise." Andrew Hannah of The Line of Best Fit stated that the record had a "pretty rare and powerful combination" of being "both a coherent listen and a sensible comment on western perception." She also highlighted every track on the album uses the same set of instruments, which works in its favor because it "makes the album completely cohesive." In a review for Crack magazine, Anna Tehabsim stated, "The album is at its very core an album to do with, and comprised of, cultural misrepresentation and sonic assimilation through various falsifications and mishaps. Yet by crafting her own enchanting and worryingly recognisable faux-oriental world, Asiatisch is Al Qadiri’s most insatiable statement yet."

A common criticism was that while Asiatisch was enjoyable musically, it lacked in the amount of depth and clear intentions of its concept. Neyland praised the "immaculate emptiness" of Asiatisch, which helped "bolster the pervading sense of dislocation of being exposed to a society that’s been fed through the photocopier one too many times." However, he was mixed towards the fact that the album is "only a political record in a faint sense, making few overt statements." He also wrote that "it’s not always so easy to trace Al Qadiri’s intentions, and the largely dynamic-free range she operates in can grate at times." Similarly, Ryce criticized the lack of depth of the album's commentary towards Chinese stereotypes, also stating that "at some level it could be considered offensive, dressing up surface-level appropriation as something smarter." However he opined that, without taking the concept into consideration, Asiatisch was "killer" as an experimental grime album. A reviewer for The Quietus felt that, while the LP is a "pleasurable and an intelligent take on sinogrime," it "doesn't offer a corrective of Western cultural mimicry, only an accurate simulation of it, and for that reason is vulnerable to some of the criticisms it sets out to make." A Dusted magazine critic, while praising the "fascinating, diverse and expertly produced" instrumentals, stated that the album was a "missed opportunity" to commentate on the actual reality of China: "Al Qadiri makes no illusions of trying to capture the reality of China, and she’s very much operating in an imaginary sphere. But in doing so, any chance to comment on the world — China and beyond — is lost."

On the other hand, some reviewers felt the concept of Asiatisch was executed better than the actual quality of the songs. Ritchie Kevin of Now magazine wrote the album consists of "tepid, listless and melodically bland soundscapes that serve the concept more successfully than they do the listener." Josh Suntharasivam of Drowned in Sound, unfavorably comparing Asiatisch to Qadiri's previous record Desert Strike (2012), described it as "an LP that achieves its main function of criticising western stereotypes of the orient, but often to the detriment of its songs." Kate Hutchinson of NME dismissed the album as "more pretentious" than Qadiri's previous releases, calling it "minimal to the point of hollow and glacially paced to the point of boredom." She concluded that by the end of the LP, "Qadiri's instance on leaning on the keyboard's choir button may well have pushed you over the edge." The album's lack of "space" was another frequent censure. A musicOMH critic was mixed towards "the exposed sense of space and tight feeling of control which threatens to strangle much of the middle of the album." He felt that "there are times on Asiatisch where it feels like [the sounds] are a little restrictive and keep the overall sound narrower than it needs to be." Similarly, Sutharasivam wrote that the use of "space and silence" was one of the best aspects of Desert Strike, whereas "the spaces on Asiatisch feel much more like holes - rather than punctuating the music, any momentum generated seems to drain away through them." He opined the sounds "feel stretched out too thinly for the tracks to make a serious impact on your senses."

== Track listing ==
Derived from the liner notes of Asiatisch.

No.	Title	Length
1.	"Shanzhai (For Shanzhai Biennial)" (featuring vocals and lyrics by Helen Feng)	4:30
2.	"Szechuan"	4:49
3.	"Wudang"	5:29
4.	"Loading Beijing"	1:12
5.	"Hainan Island"	2:58
6.	"Shenzhen"	3:45
7.	"Dragon Tattoo"	5:32
8.	"Forbidden City"	1:52
9.	"Shanghai Freeway"	5:28
10.	"Jade Stairs"	1:17
Total length:		36:52

Sample and cover credits

- "Shanzhai (For Shanzhai Biennial)" is a cover of "Nothing Compares 2 U" by Sinéad O'Connor.
- "Dragon Tattoo" features lyrics from "The Siamese Cat Song" from Lady and the Tramp (1955).
- "Loading Beijing," "Wudang," and "Jade Stairs" use samples of classical Chinese poetry, "Wudang" using what Pitchfork labeled as a "warped" vocal recording of the poem "Peach Tree Tender."

== Personnel ==
Derived from the liner notes of Asiatisch.

- Written and produced by Fatima Al Qadiri
- Lyrics on "Shanzhai (For Shanzhai Biennial)" by Helen Feng
- Mixed by Lexxx at Konk Studios in London
- Mastered by Beau Thomas at Ten Eight Seven Mastering in London
- Artwork by Shanzhai Biennial
- Photography by Asger Carlsen

== Release history ==
Region	Date	Format(s)	Label
Worldwide	5 May 2014	Cassette; CD; digital download	Hyperdub

== Charts ==
Chart (2014)	Peak position
US World Albums (Billboard)	15
