= Desert Strike (EP) =

EP by Fatima Al Qadiri
- Released: 23 October 2012
- Genre: Grime; footwork; G-funk
- Length: 16:36
- Label: Fade To Mind
- Producer: Fatima Al Qadiri

Fatima Al Qadiri chronology
GSX Remixes (2012)	Desert Strike (2012)	Asiatisch (2014)

Singles from Desert Strike
- 1. "Ghost Raid" Released: 11 October 2012

Desert Strike is the third extended play of Kuwait musician Fatima Al Qadiri. The record is based on Desert Strike: Return to the Gulf (1992), a video game that in turn is based on events of Operation Desert Storm of the Gulf War. As a kid who lived in Kuwait during the Gulf War, Qadiri played the game a year after it took place, which messed with how she remembered experiencing the actual war. Given how dark the game portrayed the Gulf War, she intended the extended play to represent a positive and "innocent" view of it by pairing a palette of childlike sounds with war sound effects. Released on 23 October 2012 by the label Fade To Mind, Desert Strike garnered generally favorable reviews from professional music journalists and landed on Spin magazine's list of the "Best Dance Albums of 2012."

== Concept ==
"I feel like it's really cruel and disgusting when video games are made out of real war. It's just a disturbing thing, and anybody who's survived any war conflict and played a video game about it afterwards can tell you how disturbing that is. It's making something really profound and deep and disturbing into something trivial and fake."

— Qadiri in an interview with Dummy

Fade to Mind's press release for Desert Strike described the extended play as "the synthesis of terror and child-like wonder, to the strategies of imagination and gaming." The EP is based on Desert Strike: Return to the Gulf (1992), a video game for the Sega Genesis which in turn is based on events of Operation Desert Storm of the Gulf War. She played it a year after she experienced the war personally while living in Kuwait. Playing the game messed with her memories of what she really experienced during the war. Qadiri explained, "it really messed me up in the head, because I was just like ‘how does this exist in a format that I can play?' I couldn't even describe how disturbing the feeling was."

As a kid, in order to "take hold" of how Qadiri remembered the war, she used a Casio keyboard to perform melodies that made fictional worlds and "war games" for her and her sister to be involved in. Similarly when she was an adult, given the dark way the game viewed the war, Qadiri wanted the EP to present a more positive, "deep," and "innocent" perspective of the event. As Dummy explained, "Desert Strike as a game gave the children the sickening power of being able to see their situation from another, jarring perspective, and so 'Desert Strike' as an EP tries to make that active participation something that is actually positive and empowering, rather than a sinister role reversal or trivialisation of a tragedy." Some journalists and Qadiri herself have categorized Desert Strike as a major part of a phenomenon coined by writer Sophia Al Maria as "Gulf Futurism."

== Composition ==
While technically based on the video game of the same name, Desert Strike is completely devoid of what Qadiri described as the "ugly" and "unsettling" tone of the game's soundtrack. Instead, it consists of bright, childlike sounds alongside otherwise serious war sound effects. Dummy described the record as having "a rough-around-the-edges aesthetic that naively, almost playfully, runs rings around the themes of conflict and aggression." Desert Strike follows what writer Rory Gibb categorized as a "disembodied dance" structure that uses styles of grime music, footwork, and G-funk.

Similar to Qadiri's previous records, Desert Strike has a sound palette primarily consisting of 1980s and 1990s-style digital keyboard replications of instruments such as choirs, horns, steel drums, organs, gunshots and explosions. These are played alongside 8-bit video game textures over what the press release labeled as "sparse, decisive percussion." Jackson analyzed the choir sounds "give the EP a somewhat uneasy feel, serving as either the source of a particular song's eeriness or alternately providing a touch of angelic air to the procession, depending on what they are paired along with." Differences from Qadiri's past records include slower tempos and "more spacious" structures, wrote Glenn Jackson of XLR8R.

== Release and promotion ==
"Ghost Raid" was released on 11 October 2012, and its video, produced by Alex Gvojic of the company Thunderhorse for MOCA LA, was revealed on 1 February 2013. The Fader summarized the video, "Collapsing real life war footage into vintage video game animations and original CGI wizardry, Alex Gvojic depicts an imaginary weapon of mass destruction called the "Ghost," supernaturally animated by djinn, a spirit in Islamic mythology believed to influence the minds and hearts of men by incarnating itself in various living forms." In an interview with Rhizome, Qadiri stated she was working with Al-Maria on a music video for the EP's title track. However, a music video for the song has not been released. Fade to Mind released Desert Strike in digital stores and on vinyl on 23 October 2012.

== Critical reception ==
Professional ratings
Review scores
Source	Rating
Noisey	B+
Pitchfork	7.9/10
Resident Advisor	3.5/5
Tiny Mix Tapes	4/5 discs
XLR8R	7.5/10

Numerous journalists, including Carey Waggoner and Gibb, compared the sound quality of Desert Strike to Qadiri's previous release Genre Specific Xperience (2011). Reviewing for Noisey, Waggoner graded the EP a B+, calling it "extraordinary" but feeling that it wasn't as musically varied or "opulent" as Genre Specific Xperience. As Gibb opined, "Most tracks here are strong enough to exist by themselves, but lacking the drive of Genre-Specific Xperience, at times they feel frustratingly fragile, beautiful and absorbing miniatures that could be scattered to the wind within a fraction of a second." Allison Stewart of The Washington Post called the EP a "chilly and fascinating work," describing it as a "deceptively mild offering that shouldn't work — its songs are virtually indistinguishable from each other, it's impossible to separate its inherent worth from Al Qadiri's backstory, the Enya-esque backing vocals often make it seem like apocalyptic spa music — but it does, somehow." Desert Strike was placed on Spin magazine's list of the "20 Best Dance Albums of 2012," where the publication called it the year's most "socially relevant" electronic record.

== Track listing ==
Derived from the liner notes of Desert Strike.

No.	Title	Length
1.	"Ghost Raid"	2:16
2.	"Oil Well"	4:05
3.	"War Games"	3:08
4.	"Desert Strike"	3:42
5.	"Hydra"	3:25
Total length:		16:36

== Personnel ==
Derived from the liner notes of Desert Strike.

- Written and produced by Fatima Al Qadiri
- Mixed and mastered by Jeremy Cox at Jeremy Cox Mastering in Denver, Colorado

== Release history ==
Region	Date	Format(s)	Label
Worldwide	23 October 2012	Digital download; vinyl	Fade to Mind
