= Fatima Al Qadiri =

Kuwaiti musician and conceptual artist

Fatima Al Qadiri فاطمة القديري
- Also known as: Ayshay
- Born: July 1981 (age 45); Dakar, Senegal
- Genre: Electronic music
- Occupations: DJ; music producer; artist
- Instruments: Synthesizer; computer
- Years active: 2009–present
- Labels: Hyperdub; Fade to Mind; Uno NYC; Tri Angle
- Member of: Future Brown
- Website: fatimaalqadiri.com

Fatima Al Qadiri (Arabic: فاطمة القديري; born July 1981) is a Kuwaiti musician and conceptual artist.

== Biography ==
Fatima Al Qadiri is the daughter of Mohammed Al Qadiri, a former Kuwaiti diplomat and writer, and Thuraya Al-Baqsami, an artist and writer. Her sister is the visual artist Monira Al Qadiri. She was born in Dakar, Senegal, in July 1981, where her father was doing work as a diplomat at the time. She moved back to Kuwait with her family at age two and, at age seventeen, Al Qadiri graduated from high school in Kuwait and went on to pursue a college education in the United States. On scholarships from the Ministry of Higher Education in Kuwait, Al Qadiri briefly attended various colleges—Pennsylvania State University, George Washington University, and the University of Miami—before transferring to New York University and earning a bachelor's degree in Linguistics at age twenty-two. After college, she went to various different cities before moving back to the US in 2007.

== Career ==
In October 2010, Al Qadiri produced "Muslim Trance", a mini-mix for DIS magazine under the alias Ayshay, which garnered her attention. She also began her blog Global .Wav on DIS Magazine earlier that year. In 2011, Al Qadiri and the Kuwaiti artist Khalid Al Gharaballi received a grant from the Arab Fund for Arts and Culture to produce a video and sculpture installation entitled "Mendeel Um A7mad (NxIxSxM)" shown at Contemporary Art Platform (CAP) Kuwait in 2012.

From 2011 – 2012, Al Qadiri released several EPs on the labels Fade to Mind, UNO, and Tri Angle (under the name Ayshay).

In March 2013, Al Qadiri became a member of the 9 (now 8) person art collective GCC, whose work has been exhibited at the MoMA PS1, Fridericianum, Sharjah Art Foundation and Whitney Museum of American Art.

Her debut album, Asiatisch, was released by Hyperdub.

She is also part of the group Future Brown, a collaboration with Asma Maroof and Daniel Pineda of Nguzunguzu and J-Cush of Lit City Trax. Their self-titled album was released on Warp Records in 2015.

In February 2023, Al Qadiri released the ambient EP Gumar, with the lead single titled "Mojik (Your Waves)" featuring vocals from Abdullah Al Mutairi. The song was used as part of the audio for an interlude on Beyoncé's Renaissance World Tour.

== Artistry ==
As of May 2017, Fatima Al Qadiri produced her music with a setup of an 88-key MIDI controller, studio monitors, a microphone, and the digital audio workstation Logic Pro, a program she had used since 2001.

== Published works ==
- Mahma Kan Athaman (with Khalid al Gharaballi, Sophia Al Maria and Babak Radboy) published by Bidoun magazine, Issue 20, New York, 2010.
- Pâté (with Lauren Boyle) published by Common Space, New York, 2011.

== Discography ==
=== Studio albums ===
- Asiatisch (Hyperdub, 2014)
- Brute (Hyperdub, 2016)
- Medieval Femme (Hyperdub, 2021)

=== EPs ===
- Warn-U (as Ayshay; Tri Angle, 2011)
- Genre-Specific Xperience (UNO, 2011)
- GSX Remixes (UNO, 2012)
- Desert Strike (Fade to Mind, 2012)
- Shaneera (Hyperdub, 2017)
- Gumar (Hyperdub, 2023)

=== Film scores ===
- Atlantique (Milan Records, 2019)
- La abuela (Quartet Records, 2021)
- Skincare (2024)
- The Stranger (2025)
