= Elizabeth Armstrong (curator) =

American art curator

Elizabeth Neilson Armstrong
- Born: Winchester, Massachusetts, United States
- Education: University of California Berkeley, Hampshire College
- Known for: Contemporary art curation, art historical writing, museum leadership
- Awards: National Endowment for the Arts, Andy Warhol Foundation, Center for Curatorial Leadership

Elizabeth Armstrong is an American curator of contemporary and modern art. Beginning in the late 1980s, she served in chief curatorial and leadership roles at the Walker Art Center, Museum of Contemporary Art, San Diego, Orange County Museum of Art (OCMA), Minneapolis Institute of Arts and Palm Springs Art Museum. She has organized numerous touring exhibitions and catalogues that gained national and international attention; among the best known are: "In the Spirit of Fluxus" (Walker, 1993), "Ultrabaroque: Aspects of Post-Latin American Art" (San Diego, 2000), and "Birth of the Cool: California Art, Design, and Culture at Midcentury" (OCMA, 2007). She is also known for organizing three California Biennials (2002–6) and notable exhibitions of David Reed and Mary Heilmann (the artist's first retrospective). Armstrong's curatorial work and publications have been recognized by the Andy Warhol Foundation, the Center for Curatorial Leadership, the Getty Foundation Pacific Standard Time project and the National Endowment for the Arts, among other organizations.

== Education and career ==
Armstrong was born in Winchester, Massachusetts. She enrolled at Hampshire College in Amherst, Massachusetts intending to be an artist, but transitioned to art history and cultural studies, earning a BA in American Studies in 1974. After graduating, she worked as a grants administrator at the National Endowment for the Humanities (1976–9) before entering graduate school at the University of California Berkeley to earn an MA in the History of Art in 1982. While at Berkeley, she worked as a research assistant for the San Francisco Museum of Modern Art and as a curatorial assistant for the Lowie Museum of Anthropology, where she contributed to the 1983 publication “The Anthropology of World’s Fairs: San Francisco's Panama Pacific International Exposition of 1915." An essay based on the subject of her master's thesis, "American Scene as Satire, the Art of Paul Cadmus in the 1930s," appeared in Arts Magazine in March 1982.

She was hired by the Walker Art Center in Minneapolis as an assistant curator in 1983, taking over as curator from 1989–1996. She was hired as senior curator by the Museum of Contemporary Art, San Diego in 1996, and organized twelve exhibitions there, including four touring shows with major publications. Armstrong joined the Orange County Museum of Art (OCMA) in Newport Beach in 2001 as deputy director for programs and chief curator, serving until 2008; she served as interim director in 2001–2. During her time at OCMA, she organized three California Biennials (2002, 2004, 2006) and several touring exhibitions with accompanying publications.

In 2008, Armstrong returned to Minneapolis, taking positions at the Minneapolis Institute of Arts (MIA) as its first curator of contemporary art and as founding director of the Center for Alternative Museum Practice (CAMP). In 2014, the Palm Springs Art Museum hired her as executive director, a position she held until 2018.

== Curatorial work ==
Armstrong's curatorial work and leadership has been recognized for guiding contemporary museums through change, growth and a rethinking of their cultural roles in relation to local communities, new audiences and the wider art world. Her exhibitions seek to generate new discourse, often delving into museum and private collections to highlight underrated genres (e.g., printmaking), groups (women), themes and periods (early American modernism) or to create connections between contemporary art and other fields—design, architecture, music, decorative arts, religion—or between established, obscure and emerging artists. She has also organized several definitive or first major exhibitions involving under-recognized movements (Fluxus, California hard-edge painters), regions (Latin America, mid-century Southern California), and artists (Mary Heilmann).

=== Walker Art Center ===
At the Walker Art Center, Armstrong helped establish the museum's Print Study Center and organized several innovative exhibitions focused on printmaking, by artists ranging from Frank Stella to Susan Rothenberg. "First Impressions" (1989) documented the growth of printmaking in the United States over the previous 30 years, using diverse work by Lynda Benglis, Helen Frankenthaler, Bruce Conner and Larry Rivers and later artists Carroll Dunham, Elizabeth Murray and Donald Sultan; New York Times critic William Zimmer called the show "an especially clear statement on the origins of the contemporary art world," accompanied by a catalogue filled with now-classic images and rich quotations. Roberta Smith described the subsequent survey, "Jasper Johns: Printed Symbols" (1990), as brilliantly organized (by the different print workshops he collaborated with) to enable viewers to understand each printmaking medium as a distinct entity.

In 1993, Armstrong presented "In the Spirit of Fluxus" (organized with Joan Rothfuss), the first major museum exhibition in the U.S. to document the international Fluxus movement from the 1960s to the present, a significant contribution to scholarship on the group; the Los Angeles Times described the widely traveled exhibition as a commanding, "big, brawling, cerebral circus of an art show." During her Walker tenure, Armstrong also mounted exhibitions of Marcel Duchamp, Peter Fischli and David Weiss, Ann Hamilton and David Ireland, Robert Motherwell, Claes Oldenburg, and area photographer Paul Shambroom.

=== Museum of Contemporary Art, San Diego ===
During Armstrong's tenure at the Museum of Contemporary Art, San Diego (MCASD), she organized several notable exhibitions with an increasingly cosmopolitan focus. "Ultrabaroque: Aspects of Post-Latin American Art" (2000, curated with Victor Zamudio-Taylor) featured 80 diverse works made in the prior decade years by sixteen, far-flung, mainly younger artists (e.g., Miguel Calderón, Maria Fernanda Cardoso, Adriana Varejão, Iñigo Manglano-Ovalle). Critics described the show as ambitious, compelling and provocative in its challenge to misperceptions and stereotypes that prevented American audiences from understanding Latin American art's range and sophistication. During this time, Armstrong also curated exhibitions of Brazilian sculptor Valeska Soares, Mexican artist Silvia Gruner, French painter Bertrand Lavier, and California-based, socially engaged artist Jean Lowe.

The earlier exhibition, "David Reed Paintings: Motion Pictures" (1998), offered what critic Christopher Knight termed "an engaging, well-selected survey" of Reed’s work since the mid-1970s, including 40 canvases and five installations featuring video clips of classic film scenes (e.g., from Alfred Hitchcock’s Vertigo) in which his paintings were slipped into the décor. That same year, the Los Angeles Times called the exhibition "Double Trouble: The Patchett Collection" (1998) a "refreshingly unpretentious" show juxtaposing 200 contemporary works (from Duchamp to Raymond Pettibon, Chris Burden and Manuel Ocampo) and Americana items from the collection of Hollywood writer and director Tom Patchett.

=== Orange County Museum of Art ===
At the Orange County Museum of Art (OCMA), Armstrong was credited for re-orienting the museum in a "decidedly forward-looking" cutting-edge contemporary art direction, including the successful recasting of its California Biennials of emerging artists from throughout the state and an expansion of its international contemporary art collection. Critic David Pagel praised the 2002 biennial for its use of humor; Christopher Knight noted the 2004 biennial for its cohesiveness and high levels of accomplishment and new media, which he wrote positioned OCMA as "the go-to museum for the region’s art." In 2006, OCMA offered a sprawling, cosmopolitan biennial organized under six loose themes that Artforum wrote, broke from prevailing trends or labels for a "breath of fresh West Coast air."

Armstrong's OCMA shows that traveled widely included "Girls' Night Out" (2003), which presented two generations of groundbreaking photography, video and performance by women taking more evocative and poetic approaches to female identity, and "Villa America: American Moderns, 1900-1950" (2005), which drew on the extensive private collection of Minneapolis businessman Myron Kunin to explore the evolution of early American modernism in relation to French art and popular culture. The latter exhibition was the first museum show devoted to Kunin's collection, which Armstrong became familiar with while at the Walker; it presented an eclectic mix of well-known (Stuart Davis, Arthur Dove, Marsden Hartley, Georgia O'Keeffe) and more obscure artists, such as Peter Blume, Jared French, Morton Schamberg and Paul Tchelitchew.

Two of Armstrong's other OCMA traveling exhibitions received wide attention on both coasts. "Mary Heilmann: To Be Someone" (2007) was an overdue first retrospective of Heilmann’s work, offering more than 50 paintings across four decades and examples of her ceramics and furniture designs, along with a concurrent show of artists whose work she influenced. "Birth of the Cool: California Art, Design and Culture at Midcentury" (2007) cast a wide conceptual net, surveying the post-World War II, progressive cultural zeitgeist in Southern California through more than 150 objects, including Ray and Charles Eames designs, architectural photographs by Julius Shulman, and works by under-recognized California hard-edge painters. It was praised for its informed installation design, painting gallery, and an award-winning catalogue that design writer Steven Heller called an integrated, consistent history examining every facet of popular art for how it "expressed California’s cultural aura" during an era where it eclipsed New York City as a zone of experimentation. The Atlantic's Benjamin Schwarz termed it an "unusually intelligent and lavishly illustrated" book, the first to connect the various artistic forms that Southern California modernism took and to "provocatively suggest that a common sensibility animated all those forms."

=== Minneapolis Institute of Arts (Mia) and Palm Springs Art Museum ===
At Mia, Armstrong took on the challenge of integrating contemporary curatorial strategies into an encyclopedic museum with broader historical/cultural collections and audiences than her previous museums. In the exhibitions "Until Now: Collecting the New (1960-2010)," "More Real: Art in the Age of Truthiness" (2012), "Global Remix I: Art and Globalization" (2012) and "Global Remix II: What is Sacred?" (2013), she sought fresh ways of mixing contemporary and traditional art to engage public appreciation, dialogue and understanding. The latter exhibition deployed works from the museum’s collection and borrowed items, juxtaposing deeply traditional items of religious art (e.g., vestments) with contemporary works (a Beuys gray felt suit, a faux suit of armor by Korean artist Do-Ho Suh, Warhol images) to probe the spiritual in a postmodern world.

During her tenure at the Palm Springs Art Museum, Armstrong launched highly visible exhibitions including "Women of Abstract Expressionism" (2017), "Albert Frey and Lina Bo Bardi: A Search for Living Architecture" (2017), "Kinesthesia: Latin American Kinetic Art, 1954-1969" (2017), "Andy Warhol: Prints from the Collections of Jordan D. Schnitzer and His Family Foundation" (2018) and "Agnes Pelton: Desert Transcendentalist."

== Awards and recognition ==
Armstrong has been awarded curatorial fellowships from the Andy Warhol Foundation for the Visual Arts (2010), the Center for Curatorial Leadership (2007–8), and the National Endowment for the Arts (1989); in 2016, she was named an officer in the Order of Arts and Letters by the French Ministry of Culture. Her OCMA exhibition "Birth of the Cool" won an Art to Life Curatorial Award from Art and Living Magazine in 2008, and her Walker show, "Peter Fischli and David Weiss" won an International Association of Art Critics special exhibition award in 1998. Her catalogues that have been recognized with awards include Birth of the Cool: California Art, Design, and Culture at Midcentury (American Association of Museum Curators prize for best exhibition catalogue, 2007) and In the Spirit of Fluxus (International Association of Art Critics Award, 1994–5).

== Major publications ==
- More Real?: Art in the Age of Truthiness (2012)
- Birth of the Cool: California Art, Design, and Culture at Midcentury (2007)
- Mary Heilmann: To Be Someone (2007)
- Villa America: American Moderns, 1900-1950 (2005)
- Girls' Night Out (2003)
- Ultrabaroque: Aspects of Post-Latin American Art (2000)
- David Reed Paintings: Motion Pictures (1998)
- Peter Fischli and David Weiss: In a Restless World (1996)
- In the Spirit of Fluxus (1993)
- Jasper Johns: Printed Symbols (1990)
- First Impressions: Early Prints by Forty-Six Contemporary Artists (1989)
- Tyler Graphics, the Extended Image (1987)
