= Art Club 2000 =

American artist collective (1992–2000)

- Other name(s): Secret Art Club
- Nickname: AC2K
- Known for: Anonymous exhibition-making
- Founded: 1993
- Defunct: 2000
- Location: New York City, New York, U.S.

Membership
- Founder(s): Colin de Land
- Notable members: Craig Wadlin, Soibian Spring, Sarah Rossiter, Will Rollins, Shannon Pultz, Daniel McDonald, Gillian Haratani, Patterson Beckwith

Art
- Style: Conceptual photography, appropriation art
- Notable works: Commingle (1993), Soho So Long (1996)

Other
- Associated groups: Bernadette Corporation

Art Club 2000 (AC2K) was an American art collective that operated from 1993 to 2000, composed of art students from Cooper Union and art dealer Colin de Land, who ran the experimental gallery American Fine Arts, Co. The primary artists associated with the collective besides de Land included Craig Wadlin, Soibian Spring, Sarah Rossiter, Will Rollins, Shannon Pultz, Daniel McDonald, Gillian Haratani and Patterson Beckwith. Rossiter left the group early on, and Rollins joined later. They initially went by the name Secret Art Club, before adopting the Art Club 2000 moniker in 1994.

== Background ==
AC2K was influenced by the rise of institutional critique, conceptual art, and the work of the Pictures Generation, with their emphasis on appropriating commercial imagery and the language of advertising towards critical ends. Some commentators have pointed out that they were coming of age in a time of hyper-commercialism for New York City and the art world, but also attended Cooper Union tuition-free and studied with radical artists like Hans Haacke and Mark Dion, forcing them to embody the contradictions of being young artists in the city. Like the collective Bernadette Corporation, also started by Copper Union students, they worked adjacent to fashion.

Colin de Land founded American Fine Arts, Co. in 1986, after moving his gallery, which had been titled 'Vox Populi' to 40 Wooster Street. He had formerly held odd jobs such as writing blurbs for TV Guide, and was known as a dealer for favoring conceptual work, going as far as exhibiting 'fictional artists' like John Dogg. In 1992, de Land invited a group of students who had studied with Hans Haacke to do a project, and they formed the association that would become Art Club 2000.

== Exhibitions at American Fine Arts, Co. ==
From 1993 to 1999, AC2K produced annual exhibitions at American Fine Arts, Co. (AFA), in collaboration with dealer Colin de Land. Some observers referred to them as "the gallery's house band". AFA had a reputation for showing experimental work, such as that of Vito Acconci and Earthworks artists, but presented within the identity of art-dealing and the market. De Land's wife was prominent dealer Pat Hearn.

=== Commingle (1993) ===
AC2K's first exhibition Commingle (1993) focused on the Gap corporation's cooptation of youth and arts culture. The Gap's East Village arrival on St. Mark's Place in 1988 was seen as a step in the gentification of spaces associated with Downtown counterculture. The Gap's infamous "Individuals of Style" ad campaign featured stark black and white portraits (by Annie Leibovitz, Steven Meisel, and others) of well known figures from the arts, including Spike Lee, Joan Didion, William Burroughs, Madonna, Anthony Kiedis, Jim Dine, and gallerist Leo Castelli. Responding to the campaign, AC2K photographed themselves wearing Gap apparel in sites around New York City, examining the Gap's idealized, market-driven depiction of artistic style as reinforcing individuality and unstated conformity. In group photographs, a format that the artists would use in future projects, AC2K staged themselves within carefully selected Manhattan settings such as Times Square.

All of the artists in the group applied to work at the Gap in an attempt to access corporate materials. When none were hired, they scavenged corporate trash from Gap store dumpsters to recover employee loss prevention and sales manuals, customer service protocols and reports, and other directives. Physical installations and sculptures made of slat wall, Gap shoe boxes, and other materials collected from the stores' refuse were constructed at American Fine Arts, Co. into an exhibition that combined research, reportage photography, trash-as-art, and authoritative wall text. By putting the corporation's cultural branding in conversation with its standard corporate practices, the group created a humorous and chaotic take on Institutional Critique, which was a large discourse in the art world of their time.

In the lead-up to the exhibition, the group produced a pastiche of a Gap advertisement featuring a portrait of Colin de Land as if he was part of the "Individual of Style" ad campaign. Foregrounding de Land as its iconic promotional representative, AC2K acknowledged his fundamental role as producer and industry impresario. Following the ad's publication in Artforum, the Gap faxed a cease and desist letter to American Fine Arts, Co. Commingle would become a model for subsequent projects, where sociological investigation was undertaken via narrative photography, conceptual art, documentary, or more chaotic happenings.

=== Clear (1994) ===
Clear (1994) was an installation and fashion-based project. The project consisted of a series of transparent vinyl garments displayed on mannequins, along with photographic and spatial elements that referenced retail display and youth fashion. By adopting the visual language of commercial clothing while withholding functional or expressive detail, Clear blurred distinctions between art installation, fashion branding, and commodity display. Contemporary critics noted the work's engagement with visibility, surface, and consumer desire, situating it within broader 1990s debates around appropriation, identity, and the aesthetics of retail culture.

=== Soho So Long (1996) ===
In 1996, the group released Soho So Long, a publication interviewing artists, gallerists, and collectors about the shift some galleries were making from SoHo, once favored by the NYC art world for the availability of cheap real estate following the flight of light industry of the neighborhood. As SoHo became more expensive, some art dealers began to move to Chelsea after the Dia Foundation established a building there. At the time of AC2K's interviews, it was not clear if galleries would have a permanent presence in Chelsea, which in the 21st Century became the primary arts district in New York City for commercial galleries.

=== 1970 (1997) ===
1970 consisted of a series of interviews with artists from the 1970s presented as a video sculpture. The work, titled Untitled (Video Interviews with Artists on the Year 1970), featured conversations with figures including Carolee Schneemann, Vito Acconci, Henry Flynt, Isa Genzken, Alex Katz, Les Levine, Simon Cerigo, and Niki Logis, displayed simultaneously on a grid of vintage television monitors.

The project was conceived as a way for the collective to engage with the "vanished '70s glory days of New York art," presenting the interviews in a format that referenced both media culture and art historical memory. It was a continuation from the kind of meta-sociological inquiry that framed their previous project, Soho So Long.

== Other projects ==
For the 1994 exhibition 'Esprit d'Amusement' at Grazer Kunstverein, their first time showing outside of the US, they produced the work Kaputtmachen in Graza, a large-scale print of themselves in a trashed hotel room.

== Legacy ==
Some commentators see the group as falling into many of the same tropes that they critiqued. For instance, by choosing Gap as subject in 1993, they ended up using the brand as a way of developing their own visibility and publicity. Others have noted that their gestures assumed that there was no alternative to the art market, and their attitude represented the crisis for young artists during the turn of the century.

Art Club 2000 was part of a wave of artists who used anonymity and corporate structure to parody the way that aesthetics were circulating under late capitalism, including their peers Bernadette Corporation and Reena Spaulings, and later groups like K-Hole and Jogging.

Several of the members have gone on to have individual careers as fine artists, most notably Paterson Beckwith and Daniel McDonald, who have continued to take up commercial imagery in their work. In 2021, Art Club 2000 was the subject of a retrospective exhibition at Artists Space in New York City, titled ART CLUB2000: Selected Works 1992-1999. It later toured in Europe to Kunsthalle Zürich.

In 2023, art critic Domenick Ammirati compared American Fine Arts Co. with its exhibitions made by Art Club 2000 to O'Flaherty's, a gallery run by Jamian Juliano-Villani and Billy Grant. The comparison was made due to the elevation of dealing art as an act, to an element of self-aware performance.

== See also ==
- The Pictures generation
- Appropriation art
- Institutional critique
