= The Armory Show (art fair) =

Art fair in New York City

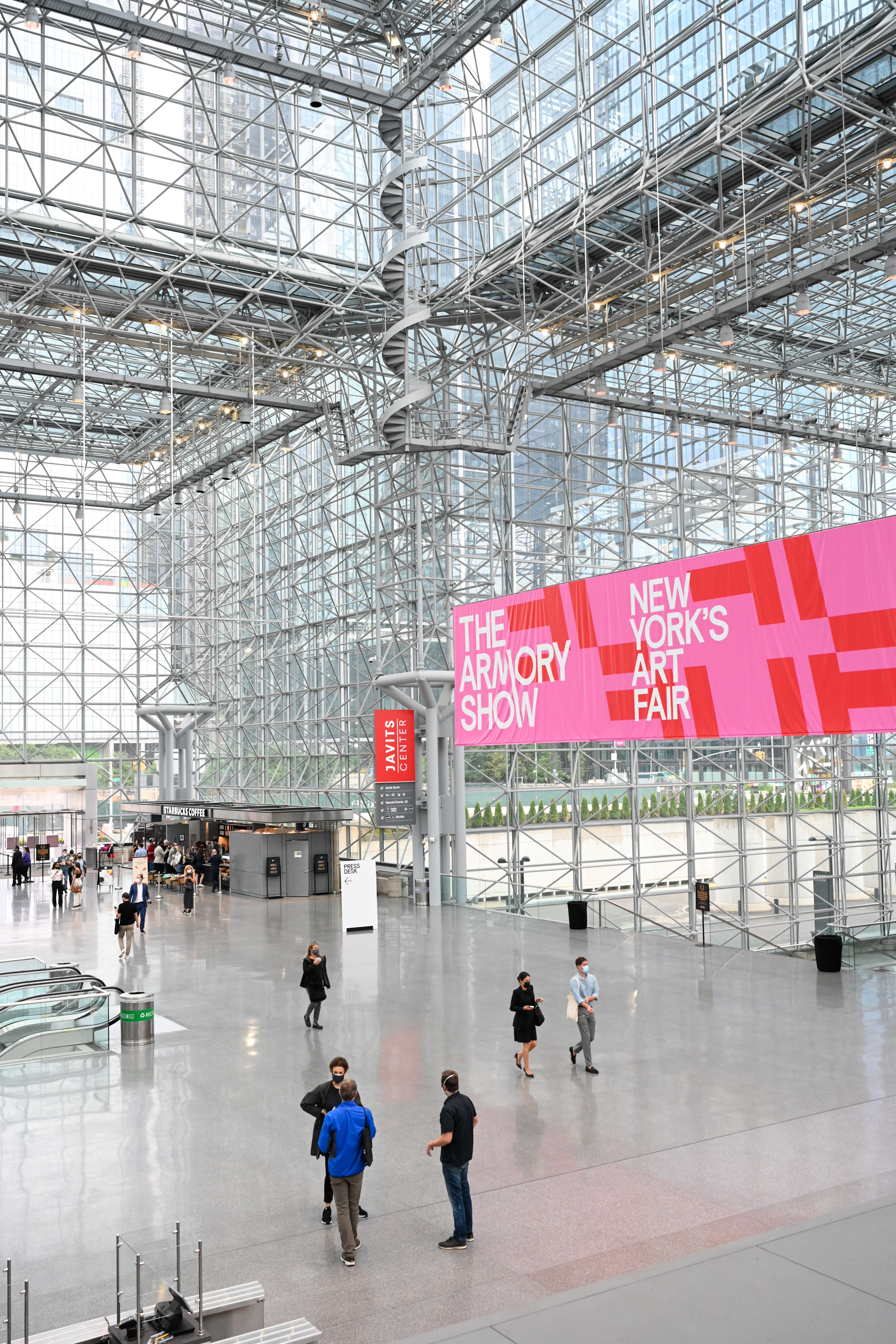
- Date: September 9–11, 2022
- Location: The Javits Center, New York, NY

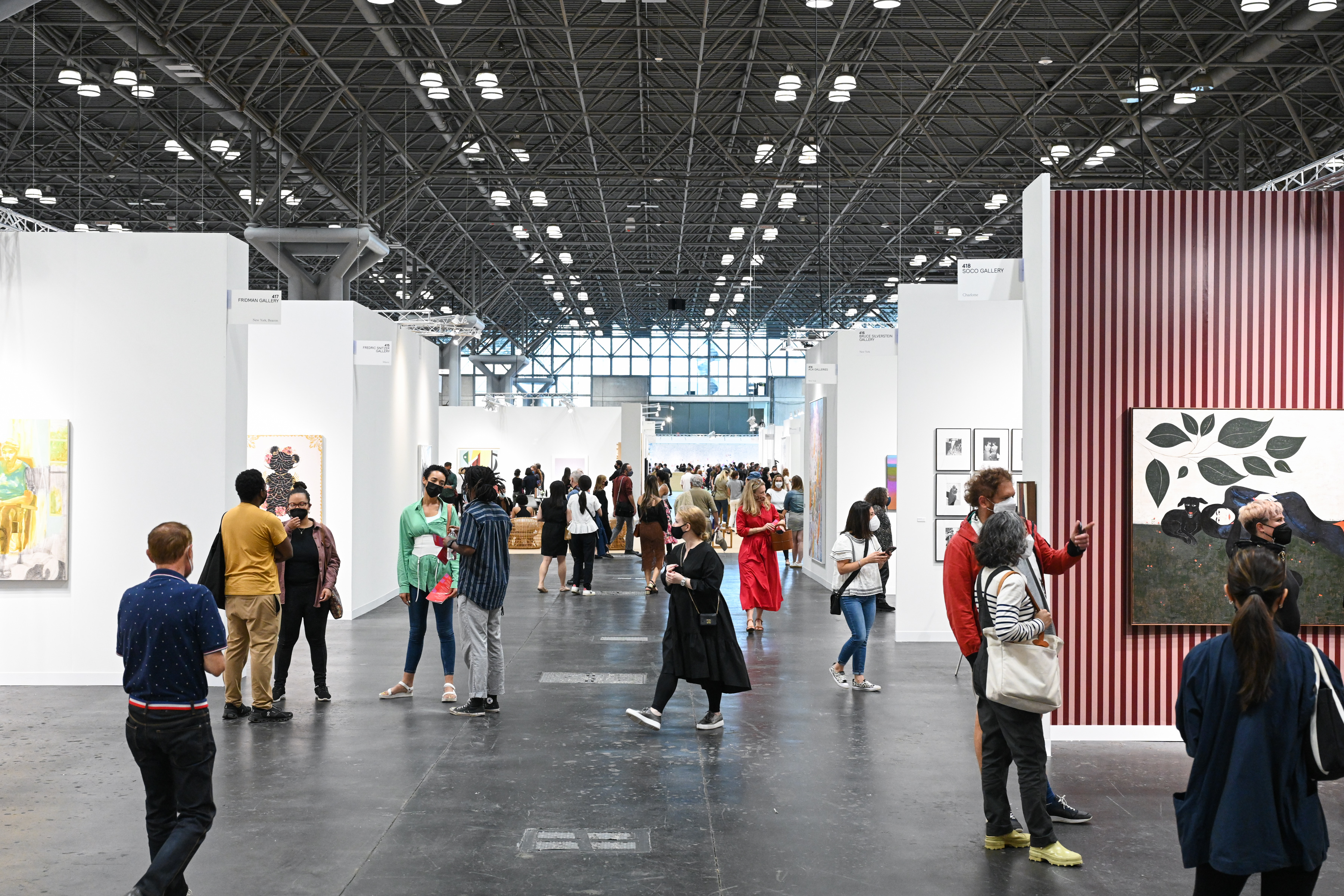
The Armory Show 2021

The Armory Show is an international art fair in New York City, known as New York's Art Fair. Established in 1994 as the Gramercy International Art Fair by dealers Colin De Land, Pat Hearn, Lisa Spellman, Matthew Marks and Paul Morris, the annual fair is held every fall for four days and attracts crowds of 65,000. The art fair reports sales of $85 million as of 2008. Many smaller fairs and special events are held the same week in New York, effectively called "Armory Show Week" or "New York Arts Week". The Armory Show was acquired by the London Frieze Art Fair in July 2023.

== History ==
Founded in 1994 as the Gramercy International Art Fair, the first iteration of the fair was held in the rooms of the Gramercy Hotel in New York City by five art dealers: Colin De Land, Pat Hearn, Lisa Spellman, Matthew Marks and Paul Morris. The fair outgrew its original location and was renamed "The Armory Show" in 1999, to reflect its updated location, the 69th Regiment Armory, site of the famous Armory Show of 1913.

The 69th Regiment Armory location was only temporary, but The Armory Show was inspired by the 1913 Armory Show's shared mission to present new art from around the world to New York City under one roof. The opportunity to celebrate this revolution in American art and culture led The Armory Show to preserve its name despite venue changes. After several editions at the Gramercy Park Hotel and Chateau Marmont, New York's Art Fair moved to the West Side piers (Piers 88 & 90) in 2001. In 2009, The Armory Show expanded to a new home on Piers 92 & 94 with the introduction of The Armory Show – Modern. Until 2020 Pier 94 was dedicated to Contemporary art, and Pier 92 to Modern. Pier 94 - Contemporary was home to Armory Presents and Armory Focus sections. In 2021, The Armory Show, the Marquee event of The Armory Week and New York Arts Week, moved its dates to September. In 2020, the fair announced its new venue, the Javits Center, where the fair took place in September 2021. In 2022 the fair was held at the Javits from September 9–11.

== Programming ==
The Armory Show comprises five integrated sections presenting contemporary and modern art. These sections include "Galleries," "Solo," "Focus," "Presents," and "Platform." "Galleries" is the core section of The Armory Show, where leading international galleries present outstanding 20th- and 21st-century artworks across a range of media. In "Solo", intimate presentations focus on the work of a single emerging, established, or historic artist working in the 20th or 21st century. "Focus" is dedicated to solo-and dual-artist presentations that explore new themes each year. In "Presents," galleries no more than ten years old showcase recent work through solo-and dual-artist presentations. All artworks in Presents are less than three years old. "Platform" is dedicated to large-scale installations and site-specific works under a new theme each year.

The Armory Artist Commission was launched in 2002 to support living artists by spotlighting the work of a different artist each year. Past recipients include: Kapwani Kiwanga, Lawrence Abu Hamdan, Xu Zhen, Liz Magic Laser, Theaster Gates, Gabriel Kuri, Susan Collis, Ewan Gibbs, Mary Heilmann and John Waters, Pipilotti Rist, John Wesley, Jockum Nordström, Lisa Ruyter, Barnaby Furnas, and Karen Kilimnik. In 2019, The Armory Show presented the Gramercy International Prize, which awards a nominated gallery with a booth at no cost to showcase a solo or dual-artist presentation. In 2021 The Armory Show launched Armory Off-Site a new initiative presenting large-scale and interactive artworks in key public areas around the city in conjunction with the Fair and New York Arts Week.

In 2025, The Armory Show collaborated with the Queens Museum and Gagosian to present an enlarged reproduction of Honor Titus's painting Louis Malle Practice on the museum's façade during the US Open. The project also commemorated the 75th anniversary of Althea Gibson breaking the color barrier at the US Nationals.
