= Colin de Land =

American art dealer

Colin de Land (1955–2003) was an American art dealer in New York City, who ran Vox Populi and American Fine Arts, Co. De Land founded the Armory Show with American art dealer Pat Hearn in 1994.

== Art gallery ==
De Land studied philosophy and linguistics at New York University.

In 1984, De Land opened Vox Populi, on East Sixth Street in the East Village. De Land renamed the gallery American Fine Arts, Co. In 1986, it moved the space to 40 Wooster Street. Colin was an early supporter of Andrea Fraser, Cady Noland, Mark Dion, Jessica Stockholder, John Waters, and Christian Philipp Müller. Waters said that de Land was “a cult gutter-couture icon.”

De Land regularly had art theory and history classes for art collectors. Art Club 2000, a six-member collaborative made up of recent Cooper Union grads, formed in 1992 in collaboration with de Land. Art Club 2000 would have a show annually at American Fine Arts Co. for the next seven years. In his obituary Roberta Smith wrote, "he was known for his relaxed work habits and even more relaxed art installations, which did not all open on time, as well as an insistent sartorial style that presaged the white trash look. At times he exhibited fictive artists, like John Dogg, whose work was widely assumed, but never confirmed, to have been made by Mr. de Land and the artist Richard Prince."

== Armory Show ==
In 1994, the Gramercy International Art Fair, now called the Armory Show, made its debut in the rooms and hallways of New York's Gramercy Park Hotel. At the time, the Fair was an alternative to the more polished and established fairs like Art Basel and Art Chicago. Four dealers and gallerists, Pat Hearn, Colin de Land, Matthew Marks and Paul Morris, worked together to bring in a younger generation of downtown artists who were working through the recession that plagued the 1980s. A number of seminal contemporary artworks and performances debuted at the fair including Mark Dion's Lemonade Stand (1996), Andrea Fraser's Museum Highlights: A Gallery Talk (1989), May I Help You (1991), and Renée Green's The Pigskin Library (1990).

== Foundation ==
In 1996, art dealer Pat Hearn, de Land's wife of 10 years, was diagnosed with cancer. De Land co-organized a benefit art sale to raise money for medical expenses that were not reimbursable by insurance. Over 300 artist and dealers donated work to the event. The funds generated from the event would start what is now the Pat Hearn and Colin de Land Cancer Foundation, a not-for-profit whose mission is to provide assistance for medical expenses to members of the visual arts community with cancer. After Hearn’s death in 2000, the de Land and the 2 remaining founders of The Armory Show established The Pat Hearn Acquisition Fund at The Museum of Modern Art, New York, for the sole purpose of acquiring works in all media by artists who, in the opinion of the Museum’s curators, have not received the recognition they deserve. Upon de Land's death, in 2003, the surviving founders asked that the fund be renamed to include Colin.

== Collections ==
The American Fine Arts Co. and Pat Hearn Gallery collections were acquired by The Center for Curatorial Studies at Bard College (Bard CCS), in Annandale-on-Hudson, N.Y. In 2018 Bard CCS organized the show "The Conditions of Being Art: Pat Hearn Gallery and American Fine Arts, Co. (1983–2004)" at Hessel Museum of Art on "the shared histories, art, and programming activities of Pat Hearn Gallery and American Fine Arts, Co., Colin de Land Fine Art" and published a book of the same title (Dancing Foxes Press, 2018). In addition, the Colin de Land papers are held at the Smithsonian Archives of American Art.

== Publications ==
American Fine Arts, Co. and Colin de Land are the subject of two books. "Colin De Land, American Fine Arts Co." (2008) features photos from de Land's archive as well as statements from over 50 artists. The book "Dealing with—Some Texts, Images, and Thoughts Related to American Fine Arts, Co.“ (2012) tries to develop an understanding of how American Fine Arts, Co. functioned as a gallery.
