= Jessica Stockholder =

American artist

- Born: 1959 (age 66–67); Seattle, Washington, United States
- Education: Yale University, University of Victoria
- Known for: Installation artist, sculptor, painter, graphic artist, printmaker
- Awards: Guggenheim Fellowship, Smithsonian Museum (Lucelia Artist), Anonymous Was A Woman Award, National Endowment for the Arts, Canada Council
- Website: https://jessicastockholder.info/

Jessica Stockholder, Lay of the Land, Installation view; orange plastic shopping baskets, driveway mirrors, oriental carpet, wooden stools, acrylic paint, pendant lights and bulbs, hardware; 275 x 345 x 350 cm; Centraal Museum, Utrecht, Netherlands; 2019.

Jessica Stockholder (born 1959) is a Canadian-American artist known for site-specific installation works and sculptures that are often described as "paintings in space". She came to prominence in the early 1990s with monumental works that challenged boundaries between artwork and display environment as well as between pictorial and physical experience. Her art often presents a "barrage" of bold colors, textures and everyday objects, incorporating floors, walls and ceilings and sometimes spilling out of exhibition sites. Critics suggest that her work is informed by diverse artistic traditions, including abstract expressionism, color field painting, minimalism and Pop art. Since her early career, they have noted in her work an openness to spontaneity, accident and marginality and a rejection of permanency, monetization and disciplinary conventions that Stephen Westfall characterized as an "almost shocking sense of freedom".

Stockholder has shown at the Dia Art Foundation, Centre Pompidou, Whitney Museum of American Art, MoMA PS1, and Venice Biennale. Her work belongs to numerous museums, including the Museum of Modern Art (MoMA), Museum of Contemporary Art, Los Angeles (MOCA), Art Institute of Chicago, British Museum, and Stedelijk Museum Amsterdam. She has received awards from the Guggenheim Foundation, Smithsonian American Art Museum, Anonymous Was A Woman and National Endowment for the Arts, among others. She lives in Nanaimo, British Columbia, Canada, with her husband, painter Patrick Chamberlain, where they moved in 2024 when she retired from teaching at the University of Chicago.

== Early life and career ==
Stockholder was born in Seattle in 1959 and raised in Vancouver, Canada. Her parents, Fred and Kay Stockholder, were English professors at the University of British Columbia. As a teen, she took private drawing lessons with sculptor Mowry Baden, a friend of her father's with whom she formally studied later at the University of Victoria (BFA, 1982). Her undergraduate work focused on painting, but explored nontraditional approaches beyond the picture frame, involving objects, boundaries and architecture that remain central to her art. An often-cited early work, Installation in My Father's Backyard (1983), for example, incorporated painted objects affixed or adjacent to her father's garage, including a double mattress, cupboard door, roll of chicken wire, and rectangular patch of painted grass.

In 1983, Stockholder enrolled at Yale University where she studied with Judy Pfaff, Jake Berthot, Mel Bochner and Ursula von Rydingsvard, among others, and earned an MFA in 1985. Her work at Yale was often ephemeral and ambiguous regarding boundaries between artwork and architecture. Her subsequent Kissing the Wall sculptures (1987–90) continued this approach with stand-alone objects, engaging intervening spaces between wall and artwork with mirrors and attached lamps that cast colored light on walls and structures. After graduating, Stockholder moved to Brooklyn. She attracted recognition in the late 1980s through exhibitions organized by PS1, Mercer Union (Toronto), The Mattress Factory (Pittsburgh), and soon after, American Fine Arts (New York), Le Consortium (France), the Whitney Museum (including the 1991 Biennial), and Renaissance Society (Chicago), among others.

== Work and reception ==
Stockholder's installations and exhibitions combine found and purchased objects, zones of painted, carpeted or intrinsic color, and various framing devices into unified "walk-in paintings" that merge artwork and architecture, surface and support, and figure and ground. Critics identify her key concerns as subjectivity, visual syntax and meaning-making, physical and temporal experience, and the upending of viewing habits and artistic conventions. David Pagel described her installations as "unglamorous inventories of readily available items [and] rambunctiously open-ended yet rigorously structured constellations", in which "unpretentious, anyone-could-do-it ingenuity bridges the gap between dreamy idealism and down-to-earth pragmatism".

Stockholder's work has been discussed in relation to the development of installation art and to art-historical traditions and figures including Cézanne and early modernism (e.g., Matisse, Cubism and Kurt Schwitters), Action, Color field and Hard-edge painting, Minimalism, Anthony Caro, Gordon Matta-Clark, and Robert Rauschenberg. Critic Barry Schwabsky suggested that these precedents share with Stockholder a rejection of illusionism, an emphasis on the physicality of painting surfaces or objects, and a direct, aggressive use of materials. Helen Molesworth and Jack Bankowsky have identified a "cataloguing of avant-garde strategies" in Stockholder's art that they suggest has led to misreadings of her work in either purely formalist terms or sociological terms involving critiques of consumer culture, institutions or class. Bankowsky and Schwabsky contend that Stockholder chooses recognizable objects for their formal, material or typological attributes rather than literal or functional ones (e.g., versus Rauschenberg), yet deploys them without completely stripping their extra-artistic connotations.

Jessica Stockholder, Your Skin in This Weather Bourne Eye-Threads & Swollen Perfume, paint, concrete, structolite, building materials, carpet, lamps, electrical cord, plastic stacking crates, swimming pool liner, welded steel, stuffed shirts pillows, papier maché, balls; 5 meters x 1,097 meters square; 1995, Dia Foundation, New York City.

Michael Kimmelman, contrasting the irony and social commentary of installation contemporaries (Cady Noland, Jason Rhoades and Nancy Rubin), distinguished the "funky lunacy" and wit of Stockholder's work as more sensory, poetic, romantic and celebratory. Writers frequently note Stockholder's de-familiarization of the everyday as contributing to such qualities as well as states of disorientation and fantasy in her work. She achieves this through the juxtaposition of incompatible items, the use of color (intrinsic or applied) to assert unlikely connections, and a spatial approach that refuses any privileged vantage point. Germano Celant described this approach as questioning "the fragmentation of awareness and perspectives, in favor of an all-encompassing vision, devoid of hierarchies and boundaries". As a result, many critics interpret Stockholder's intent in terms of exploration or experimentation—in Miwon Kwon's words, "a both/and attitude rather than one of either/or"—that maintains contradictions.

=== Early installations and sculpture ===
Throughout her career, Stockholder's work has largely been divided between temporary, site-specific installations created for quasi-public spaces such as museums and more human-scaled, autonomous assemblages or sculptures, often built in her studio and exhibited in galleries. Her installations and gallery exhibitions in the 1990s were noted for their quirky juxtapositions, rough construction, and unusual mix of unruliness with refined, Matisse-like color and patterning. In reviews of shows at American Fine Arts (1990) and Jay Gorney (1995) New York Times critic Roberta Smith characterized the work as provocative, "insistently abstract", and unsettling in its determination "to stop making visual sense, to combine the unlikely styles of assemblage art and Color Field painting [in] hybrids so discursive and strange that the mind can't quite take hold of them". A Los Angeles Times review of a show in 1996 described Stockholder's "gloriously klutzy sculptures" as unwieldy and casually offhanded, but held together by "an acute, formal intelligence".

Stockholder created major installations in the 1990s at the Dia Foundation, Middelheim Open Air Sculpture Museum (Landscape Linoleum, 1998, Antwerp), and Power Plant (Toronto), among others. The Dia work, Your Skin in This Weather Bourne Eye-Threads & Swollen Perfume (1995), occupied a 3,600-square-foot room, spilling into the center's lobby and out windows into an alley. Michael Kimmelman described it as raucous and operatic, with blocks of bouncing high-key color and multiple vantage points creating the experience of "entering a Matisse cutout, David Hockney stage set" or Frank Gehry structure. Curator Lynne Cooke wrote that Stockholder "tangibly, concretely, merges art space and real space, such that [they] become interchangeable", allowing her painterly space to achieve a quality of lived experience comparable to architecture. Sculpture's Deborah Solomon called the Power Plant installation (First Cousin Once Removed or Cinema of Brushing Skin, 1999) a Fauvish tour-de-force of "deeply cultured zaniness". She wrote that the work "domesticated" art history, with overflowing contents—lamps, linoleum, dropped ceiling, upended wheelbarrow, and trailer truck with tires painted swimming-pool blue—that stripped modernist reference points such as Mondrian and minimalism of their typical moral gravity and utopian strivings.

Jessica Stockholder, Two Frames, pink plastic, children's chair, fake fur, plastic parts, vinyl, halogen light and fixture, weight bracket, cable, extension cord, garbage bag, yarn, beads, acrylic and oil paint, wooden drawer, metal frame; 236 x 130 x 56 cm; 2007.

=== Later installations and sculpture, 2001– ===
Critics suggest that Stockholder's later installations and exhibitions invite a greater degree of connectivity and viewer participation by incorporating "viewing" ramps and platforms, locally salvaged materials and objects, and other artists' work. They also identify a shift in materials, toward bright, domestic discount-store items such as buckets, laundry baskets, dish drainers and plastic cups.

Stockholder's sculpture from the 2000s has been characterized as more intimate, concise and less installation-driven than earlier work, with a balance of open space and formal rigor with looseness, improvisational freedom and painterliness. In two exhibition reviews, The New York Times described her "color field assemblages" as sliced and spliced household objects, walls and floor suggestive of "a suburban house caught in the aftermath of an explosion", bound by the clarity of seductive bright colors and paint. In a subsequent show (Mitchell-Innes & Nash, 2006), works such as JS#433 and JS#436 were noted for their mastery of color and texture, unconventional fastening and suspension methods (e.g., backpack and tent frames, bike racks), and crisply delineated forms, such as an electric cord evoking a whimsical line drawing. The Brooklyn Rail described them as "humble objects" that opened to private introspection and associations, the element of surprise, and moments of "unexpected beauty". The show, "Sex in the Office" (1301PE, 2007), was described as a provocation exploring taboo and "an erotics of mundane material surfaces".

During this period, Stockholder created temporary installations at the SITE Santa Fe biennial (Bird Watching, 2001; assembled with materials salvaged from storage bins at Los Alamos), Rice University (Sam Ran Over Sand, 2005), and PS1 (Of Standing Float Roots in Thin Air, 2006). In 2005, she exhibited two installations at Kunsthallen Brandts in Denmark, White Light Laid Frozen and Bright Longing and Soggy Up the Hill. Artforum described the former work as "a careful calibration of strange-bedfellow(s)"—a fluorescent-yellow locker, blue tabletops, strings of foil pans, old fur coats, stacked greenhouses, varied lighting and a raised wooden ramp—that vacillated "between screwball comedy and the sublime". Peer Out to See (2010, Reina Sofía Museum, Madrid) was described as "a traversable painting" that included a frozen-fountain-like sculptural form—made of piled garden chairs, children’s bathtubs and plastic baskets—that reached a glass ceiling and echoed the museum's outdoor fountain.

Jessica Stockholder, Color Jam, site-specific installation, adhesive vinyl and vinyl scrim, 2012, Chicago.

Stockholder was also commissioned to produce outdoor, temporary installations. Flooded Chambers Maid (2009, Madison Square Park) combined industrial materials, blue rubber mulch, bleachers, buckets, bins and a free-form garden into a vibrant, three-dimensional Constructivist-like painting that visitors sat, lunched and played on. For Color Jam (2012), she blanketed the four corners and buildings surrounding a busy downtown Chicago intersection in swaths of burnt orange, lime green and turquoise, creating an effect the New York Times deemed "Christo meets Hans Hofmann".

==== "Assists" and late series, 2015– ====
With the "Assists" series, Stockholder extended her exploration of fluidity and interstitial elements such as platforms and pedestals. Her "assists" are modular sculptures that can only stand upright when strapped to a large, commonplace auxiliary object (not considered part of the work), such as a chair or piano. They were exhibited in several shows beginning in 2015, including Art Basel 2018.

The show "Door Hinges" (Kavi Gupta, 2015) featured three assists strapped with vinyl belts to a piano, vintage desk, and Smart electric car, respectively, and an ephemeral installation with a snaking catwalk, titled A Log or a freezer. It also included a separate exhibit curated by Stockholder ("Assisted"), juxtaposing her work with that of sixteen artists who influenced her. Artforum's Caroline Picard called it "a profound conversation between objects and aesthetic experiments, highlighting [a] dynamic, polyvocal network". "The Guests All Crowded Into the Dining Room" (Mitchell-Innes & Nash, 2016) was an immersive exhibition including two assists, autonomous sculptures, and an ephemeral "situation" made up of a winding, scalable platform-stage that enabled the viewing of drawings which were hung over swaths of orange and pink painted on the gallery walls. In 2019, Centraal Museum mounted "Stuff Matters", a large exhibition that Stockholder co-curated with Laurie Cluitmans, in which she incorporated sixty items from the museum's collection, in a way that was analogous to her use of objects in her sculpture. The show included two assists strapped to museum items, sculptures spanning twenty years of her work, and an ephemeral installation.

Stockholder's later work includes the "EWaste" and "Specific Shape/Fixed Object" series. David Pagel described the "EWaste" pieces—reworkings of found electronic devices and hardware into abstract sculptures—as "slyly subversive", tautly composed amalgams combining free-associative speculation with the formal power of Matisse's cut-paper collages. In a 2021 show, Stockholder paired her "specific shapes"—forms hand-painted on walls whose scale changes from one installation to another—with "fixed objects", small sculptures assembled from everyday materials that remain unchanged across installations.

== Other professional activities ==
Stockholder has curated several shows of her own work and others. These shows took place at Gorney Bravin & Lee (2003), Tang Museum ("The Jewel Thief," co-curated with Ian Berry, 2010), Kavi Gupta ("Assisted," 2015), The Contemporary Austin (2018, work by Robert Davidson), Centraal Museum (with Laurie Cluitmans, 2019), and OGR Turino (2021).

From 1999 to 2011, Stockholder was director and professor of graduate studies in sculpture at Yale University. She was faculty chair of the Department of Visual Arts at the University of Chicago from 2011 to 2018, and retired from teaching in 2024.

== Recognition ==
Stockholder has received a Guggenheim Fellowship (1996); awards from the Lehmbruck Museum in Germany (2001), Smithsonian American Art Museum (Lucelia Artist Award, 2007), Anonymous Was A Woman (2012), and American Academy of Arts and Letters; and grants from the National Endowment for the Arts, New York Foundation for the Arts and Canada Council. She was elected to the National Academy of Design in 2011, and awarded honorary doctorate degrees by Emily Carr College of Art and Columbia College Chicago, in 2010 and 2013, respectively.

Stockholder's work belongs to the public collections of American museums including MoMA, Albright-Knox Art Gallery, Art Institute of Chicago, Los Angeles County Museum of Art, MOCA LA, Museum of Fine Arts, Boston, National Gallery of Art, Orange County Museum of Art, San Francisco Museum of Modern Art, and the Whitney Museum. It belongs to the international collections of the British Museum, Carré d'Art, Centraal Museum, GAM Torino, Le Consortium, Lehmbruck Museum, Mumok, Musée National d'Art Moderne (Centre Pompidou), National Gallery of Australia, Städel, Stedelijk Museum Amsterdam, and Vancouver Art Gallery, among others.

Stockholder's work was included in the 2021 exhibition Women in Abstraction at the Centre Pompidou.
