= Elise Asher =

American painter

- Born: January 15, 1912; Chicago, Illinois, U.S.
- Died: March 8, 2004 (aged 92); New York City, New York, U.S.
- Education: Art Institute of Chicago; Simmons School of Social Work
- Known for: Painting, poetry
- Spouses: Nanno de Groot (m. 1949; div. 1957) Stanley Kunitz (m. 1958)

Elise Asher (January 15, 1912 – March 8, 2004) was an American painter and poet. She is known for paintings on canvas and plexiglas, illustrating poems written by herself and others.

== Early life ==
Elise Asher was born on January 15, 1912, in Chicago, Illinois. Her mother died of cancer when she was young, so she and her three siblings were primarily raised by her father. Through her father's connections as a journalist, Asher met many intellectuals notable in Chicago during her childhood, including poet Edna St. Vincent Millay, who stayed in their home.

She attended the Art Institute of Chicago and in 1934 she graduated from Simmons School of Social Work. She moved to New York in 1947.

== Career ==
Her first show, a solo exhibition, was at the Tanager Gallery in New York in 1953. In the New York Herald Art Exhibition Notes announcing the show, she is described as "a self-taught painter...who writes poetry and paints in the non-objective contemporary trend." A review of her work in the Tanager Gallery stated that her work was, "Light, rather self-indulgent abstract paintings abound in nimble, frisky shapes."

She published her first poetry collection, The Meandering Absolute, in 1955. She remained active until shortly before her death in 2004. Sheep Meadow Press published a book of her art and poetry in 1994, and another collection of her poetry titled Night Train in 2000. At the time of her death, her works were included in many public collections, including those of the National Academy of Sciences and the Corcoran Gallery.

She was married to the artist Nanno de Groot, and later to the poet Stanley Kunitz, whose poetry featured in some of her works. She had one daughter, Babette.

The Estate of Elise Asher is represented by Eric Firestone Gallery.

== Death ==
Asher died from complications from a broken hip at her Greenwich Village home on March 8, 2004, aged 92.
