= Judy Pfaff =

American artist (born 1946)

- Born: 1946 (age 79–80); London
- Education: Cass Technical High School
- Alma mater: Washington University in St. Louis, Yale University
- Style: Installation art
- Awards: MacArthur Fellow

Judy Pfaff (born 1946) is an American artist known mainly for installation art and sculptures, though she also produces paintings and prints. Pfaff has received numerous awards for her work, including a John D. and Catherine T. MacArthur Foundation Fellowship in 2004 and grants from the John Simon Guggenheim Memorial Foundation (1983) and the National Endowment for the Arts. Major exhibitions of her work have been held at the University of Wisconsin–Madison, the Denver Art Museum and Saint Louis Art Museum. In 2013 she was elected to the American Academy of Arts and Sciences. Video interviews and profiles of the artist can be found on the PBS series Art21: Art in the 21st Century and at institutions including Miles McEnery Gallery, MoMa, and Mount Holyoke College Art Museum.

== Early life and education ==
Pfaff was born in London in 1946. Her father, a Royal Air Force pilot, was absent from her life. Pfaff's mother moved to Detroit soon after Pfaff's birth, leaving Pfaff and her brother to be raised by their grandparents. Post-war London was bleak; Pfaff has described playing in bombed out and abandoned buildings, gathering "raw materials for fantasy buildings." A reunion in 1956 with her mother in Detroit, where she attended Cass Technical High School, did not end well. At age 15, Pfaff left home and eventually married a U.S. Air Force officer. She attended Wayne State University and Southern Illinois University, completing a BFA at Washington University in 1971.

Pfaff enrolled in the MFA program at Yale University School of Art, where she embraced the use of heavy equipment and outsized materials. Other disciplines, such as physics, medicine, zoology and astronomy, also influenced her work. At Yale, Pfaff studied with Al Held, who became her mentor. With Held's encouragement, she created an installation for her final project. She completed her MFA in 1973 and then moved to New York City.

== Teaching ==
Pfaff taught at the California Institute of the Arts from 1976 to 1979. She joined the faculty at Bard College in New York in 1994, where she is currently the co-director of the Studio Arts program, and has taught painting workshops at Anderson Ranch Arts Center in Colorado.

== Style ==
Since the 70s, Pfaff has helped redefine contemporary notions of sculpture and has been recognized for her innovative approach to space. While others at the time subscribed to minimalist art forms, Pfaff began making colorful, visually active environments that encompassed an entire gallery and complicated the relationship between sculpture and the architecture that contained it.

Spanning across mediums such as painting, printmaking, sculpture and installation, it can be described as "painting in space". Pfaff draws upon spiritual, botanical, and art historical imagery, and "explores issues of creativity and the complexity of life by using strings, vines, spheres, and other objects arranged in a seemingly haphazard way". Although, Pfaff has so far refused to give narrative meaning to her work, which shows an "urgent and ferocious need to labor for the visual and tactile […] in an era where language dominates artistic activity".

Pfaff incorporates a range of everyday and industrial materials into her installations such as wire, plastic tubing, fabric, steel, fiberglass, and plaster as well as salvaged signage and tree roots. Her interest in natural motifs extends to a series of prints integrating vegetation, maps, and medical illustrations. She has also used her dramatic sculptural abilities to make set designs for several theatrical stage productions. In recent years, she has incorporated photographic and digital imagery into her installations and prints.

== Process ==
Pfaff enters an exhibition space not knowing exactly what will happen. Rice Gallery describes her working process is intuitive and highly physical; she relies on her knowledge, skill, and experience to carry her through. Her art is site-specific; each one of her installations considers the specific spatial geometries of the room so no two shows are ever alike. Pfaff and her crew may labor for months or years on shows that last day or weeks; the work is deconstructed and sections are discarded after a show comes down.

Pfaff's studio in upstate New York is filled with winches, welding equipment, a forklift, and pressure washers. When she and her assistants arrive to set up an installation, they bring with them a truck full of tools, welders, pre-cut installation components, as well as raw material, and begin to experiment. Pfaff is used to working in large spaces; her permanent installation at the Philadelphia Convention Center, cirque, CIRQUE, is reputed to be the largest suspended sculpture in the world.

== Installation art ==
In New York, Pfaff created her first large-scale installation piece, J.A.S.O.N--J.A.S.O.N., at the nonprofit Artists Space in 1975.

Pfaff describes her site-specific installations as abstract narratives based on personal experiences. Art critic Benjamin Genocchio commented that Pfaff's installation work can seem disordered, but with a closer look an order seems to reveal itself.

In 2006, Pfaff's Buckets of Rain was exhibited at the Ameringer & Yohe Fine Art gallery in New York. An exhibit that was dedicated to Al Held, and Pfaff's mother who passed. This exhibit though was a prime example of how Pfaff continued to work toward incorporating painting into her sculptures. Although, unlike past paintings Pfaff wanted to bring out the three-dimensional aspect.

Pfaff effortlessly uses the expansion of her work into space in a way that simultaneously evokes drawing, painting, and sculpture while making reference to both "high" art and popular culture. This and her use of unusual materials like: paper, encaustic, burned foil, massive tree roots, fluorescent lights, glass drops, and many more are key facets to Judy Pfaff's take on sculpture.

Pfaff's installation art demonstrates her aesthetical preferences and communicates varying emotions no matter the size or complexity. Each of her installations connects directly to her life experiences.

Judy Pfaff throughout all her site-specific installations demonstrates her perseverance in implementing her creativity no matter the setting or challenge. This especially is shown in her If I Had a Boat installation where she had to work around the limitations of how the building was structured.

Pfaff's installation work has influenced other artists, including Jessica Stockholder and Sarah Sze.

== Other media ==
In addition to her installations, Pfaff creates paintings, sculpture, and prints. "I've always done prints and drawings," Pfaff says. "If you get an installation of mine, you inherit [my assistant] Ryan, myself, a crew, the dog, the noise, the dirt. We wreck the house. So if you don't want that, then you get prints and drawings."

Pfaff has also done scenic design. In 2010 Ameringer/McEnery/Yoke showed a retrospective from her oeuvre ranging from the late 1970s to recent work. In a review in The Brooklyn Rail, Kara L. Rooney wrote of the survey's cohesion, "somehow, Pfaff's eclectic interpretation of '80s flamboyance, '90s insecurity, and the aughts' incessant optimism succeeds."

== Solo exhibitions and installations ==
During her prolific career, Pfaff has mounted over 100 solo exhibitions and installations in galleries and museums worldwide. She has had major exhibitions at Elvehjem Museum of Art, University of Wisconsin, Madison (2002); Denver Art Museum (1994); St. Louis Art Museum (1989); and Albright-Knox Art Gallery, Buffalo (1982). Her work is also included in the permanent collections of The Museum of Modern Art, the Whitney Museum of American Art, Tate Gallery, Brooklyn Museum of Art, and Detroit Institute of Arts, among others. Furthermore, she represented the United States in the 1998 Bienal de São Paulo.

Pfaff's work is not restricted to Installation Art pieces. Her other notable works include Botanica, a mixed media on paper piece owned by the Orlando Museum of Art and Imperial Hotel, a relief print using the intaglio technique owned by the Tampa Museum of Art.

== Grants and awards ==
Pfaff has received several notable awards and grants including the Lifetime Achievement Award from the International Sculpture Center (2014), the John D. and Catherine T. MacArthur Foundation Award (2004), a Bessie (1984), and fellowships from the John Simon Guggenheim Memorial Foundation (1983) and the National Endowment for the Arts (1986). She was also elected to become a member of the American Academy of Arts in 2009.

- 2021: X Grant (with Hideo Mabuchi), MacArthur Foundation
- 2020: Hirshhorn Artist X Artist Honoree, Hirshhorn Museum and Sculpture Garden, Smithsonian Institution, Washington, DC
- 2017: Francis J. Greenburger Award, Art OMI
- 2017: Jack Wolgin Annual Visiting Artist Award, Tyler School of Art, Temple University, Philadelphia, PA
- 2015: National Academy Award for Excellence in Sculpture, National Academy Museum and School, New York
- 2014: Lifetime Achievement Award, International Sculpture Center
- 2013: American Academy of Arts and Sciences, 2013 Class of New Fellows and Foreign Honorary Members, field of Visual and Performing Arts
- 2013: Anonymous Was a Woman, A Foundation of Philanthropic Funds, New York, NY
- 2010: Southern Graphics Council International Conference Lifetime Achievement Award 2010, Mark/Remarque, Philagraphika, Philadelphia, PA
- 2009: USA Fellowship, Los Angeles, CA
- 2009: Member of the American Academy of Arts and Letters, New York, New York
- 2009: Dean’s Medal, Sam Fox School of Design & Visual Arts
- 2006: Barnett and Annalee Newman Foundation Fellowship
- 2004: MacArthur Fellowship
- 2003: Nancy Graves Foundation Grant
- 2002: Award of Merit Medal for Sculpture, American Academy of Arts and Letters, New York
- 2002: American Academy of Design, New York
- 1999: Honorary Doctorate, Pratt Institute. New York
- 1998: U.S. Representative for the Bienal de Sao Paulo
- 1998: Distinguished Alumni Award, Washington University in St. Louis
- 1997: Fellow of the Saint Gaudens Memorial
- 1986: National Endowment for the Arts, Sculpture
- 1984: Bessie Award, Set Design for “Wind Devil,” BAM Production by Nina Weiner Dance Company
- 1983: Guggenheim Fellowship, Sculpture
- 1979: National Endowment for the Arts, Sculpture
- 1976: Creative Artist Public Services, Sculpture

== Recent life ==
Pfaff is the Richard B. Fisher Professor in the Arts and co-director of the studio arts program at Bard College, Annandale-on-Hudson, New York. She continues to produce work for sale and for exhibition, including installations and prints. She currently lives and works in Tivoli, NY.

== See also ==
- Inside the Artist's Studio, Princeton Architectural Press, 2015. (ISBN 978-1-61689-304-0)
