= Jimmy De Sana =

American artist (1949–1990)

Jimmy DeSana
- Born: November 12, 1949; Detroit, Michigan
- Died: July 27, 1990; Memorial Sloan Kettering Cancer Center, New York City
- Education: University of Georgia (BFA)
- Known for: New Wave punk art BDSM
- Notable work: Submission

Jimmy DeSana (November 12, 1949 – July 27, 1990) was an American artist, and a key figure in the East Village punk art and No Wave scene of the late-1970s and early-1980s. DeSana's photography has been described as "anti-art" in its approach to capturing images of the human body, in a manner ranging from "savagely explicit to purely symbolic". DeSana was close collaborators with photographer Laurie Simmons and writer William S. Burroughs, who wrote the introduction to DeSana's self-published collection of photographs Submission. His work includes the album cover for the Talking Heads album More Songs about Buildings and Food as well as John Giorno’s LP, You’re The Guy I Want To Share My Money With.

== Early life and education ==
James Arthur "Jimmy" DeSana was born in Detroit, Michigan on November 12, 1949. He was the son of James Arthur DeSana and his wife Josephine Earle Graves. He grew up in Atlanta, Georgia. In 1972, DeSana moved to New York City after studying at the University of Georgia.

== Work ==
DeSana began to take photographs as a teenager, mostly photographing his friends and acquaintances naked. Portraits included key figures of the punk and No Wave scene of the late 1970s and early 1980s in New York like Kathy Acker, Laurie Simmons, Kenneth Anger, David Byrne, Brian Eno, Laurie Anderson, Debbie Harry, and Patti Astor, amongst others.

His early photographs were of his friends striking poses in houses and gardens. He moved to New York in 1973. DeSana continued to picture the human body as the primary subject. His photography appeared in the "Punk Art" exhibition, co-curated by Marc H. Miller, Bettie Ringma, and Alice Denney, which appeared at the Washington Project for the Arts from May 15 to June 10, 1978.

Writing in 1991, the art critic Brooks Adams described DeSana's 1979 publication, Submission, as "rather extraordinary," observing that it "did much to usher in the '80s genre of grotesque or blatantly fictive and often preposterously homoerotic, S&M photography. [...] The raunchy late '70s curiosity item has become an early '90s collectible—an art-historically resonant bibelot."

DeSana worked in black and white until 1980, when he began to experiment with color photography. His Suburban series included neo-surreal, staged photographs of both nude bodies and mundane objects.

The Remainders series marked a move away from the human body towards "objects through abstraction." The series included everyday items like balloons, flour, and aluminum foil dreamily lit in spectral hues. DeSana started making these works shortly after his diagnosis with HIV in 1985.

His first exhibition was in 1979 at the Stefanotti Gallery on West 57th Street in New York City. Numerous solo exhibitions followed, including ones in Wilkinson Gallery, London; Pat Hearn Gallery, New York; Galerie Jacques de Windt, Brussels and the Museum of the Twentieth Century, Vienna, Austria DeSana was featured in the 1981 P.S.1 exhibition New York/New Wave curated by Diego Cortez and included artists like Basquiat, Sarah Charlesworth, and Kenny Scharf. DeSana's first museum retrospective was at the Brooklyn Museum in 2022–2023.

== Death and estate ==
DeSana died at the Memorial Sloan Kettering Cancer Center on July 27, 1990 from an AIDS-related illness. He left his estate to the photographer and filmmaker Laurie Simmons. It was co-managed by Simmons and Salon 94 gallery for nearly a decade. In 2022, it was announced that the estate would be co-managed with P.P.O.W. Gallery.

== Later exhibitions ==
In 2013, "Party Picks," a selection of DeSana's photography from 1975 to 1987 was shown at Salon 94 gallery.

At Pioneer Works in 2016, a suite of photographers were shown from the artist's archives. Singer and writer Johanna Fateman wrote, "[DeSana] troubled suburban interiors with nude models in precarious poses, recasting everyday objects as BDSM props in his spare, elegant tableaux."

The following year, several Cibachrome photographs were shown in a group exhibition called “Body Language” at Company gallery.

In 2020, "The Sodomite Invasion: Experimentation, Politics and Sexuality in the work of Jimmy DeSana and Marlon T. Riggs" was shown at Griffin Arts Project in North Vancouver, British Columbia.

DeSana's first museum retrospective opened at the Brooklyn Museum in late 2022. The retrospective showcased the pioneering, yet under-recognized, artist's New York City downtown art, music and film scenes during the 1970s and 1980s. The show was curated by the art historian and curator Drew Sawyer alongside the artist Laurie Simmons.

An exhibition of DeSana's work opened at the Meyer Riegger gallery in Berlin on November 4, 2023. The exhibit included fifty three of De Sana's works. In July 2024, there will be another DeSana exhibition at the KW Institute for Contemporary Art in Berlin. In 2024, DeSana's first exhibition in Asia was held in Seoul, South Korea.

== Publications ==
- 101 Nudes, Offset prints in custom portfolio box, Fifty-six parts, each 11 x 14 inches, 1972/91
- Submission, Introduction by William Burroughs, 1979
- Jimmy DeSana: Suburban, Text by Laurie Simmons, Dan Nadel, and Elisabeth Sussman, 2015 (Salon 94)
- The Sodomite Invasion: Experimentation, Politics and Sexuality in the work of Jimmy DeSana and Marlon T. Riggs, 2022 (Griffin Arts Project)
- Jimmy DeSana: Submission, Edited with text by Drew Sawyer, preface by Anne Pasternak, and epilogue by Laurie Simmons, 2022 (Delmonico Books/Brooklyn Museum)
- Salvation, Edited by James Hoff and Laurie Simmons Studio, Designed by Rick Myers, 2024 (Primary Info)
- Quotations from Jimmy DeSana, Edited by James Hoff, Designed by Rick Myers, 2024 (Primary Info)

== Collections ==
- Institute of Contemporary Art, Boston, MA
- Metropolitan Museum of Art, New York
- Museum of Contemporary Art, Chicago, IL
- Museum of Fine Arts, Houston, TX
- Museum of Modern Art, New York, NY
- Whitney Museum of American Art, New York, NY
