= Gretchen Faust =

American artist

Gretchen Faust (born 1961 in Stoneham, Massachusetts, USA) is an American contemporary artist, performer, art historian, and yoga instructor who lives and works in Totnes, Devon, United Kingdom. She is known for her visual art and performance work at galleries in New York, Pittsburgh and Zürich.

== Education ==
Faust earned a BA at Smith College (1983)and an MFA (1986) at Hunter College.

== Work ==
In the early 1990s she became known for using the tip of an ice pick to write text fragments from lectures on art history into gallery walls. In her more recent works, she produced mandala-like paper cutouts, engraved plinths made of Portland stone, photographs of paired handguns, or pairs of large, rug-like circles made of rabbit skins, and camouflage material laid out on the floor. In 2013, Martin Herbert wrote in Frieze magazine: "there are consistently continuities: symmetry and asymmetry, sophistication and violence and a variable and explicit focus on cutting, punching, firing - penetrating the surface of things". Faust has described her artwork as similar to yoga: "I’d say the personal process is the same. Cultivating presence and intimacy. And the outcome can result in different forms, depending on the circumstances of intention".

== Exhibition history ==
Her work has been shown in group exhibitions at the Kunsthalle Schirn, Frankfurt, the New Museum, New York (with Kevin Warren), wellwellwell, Vienna, MAGASIN - Centre National d’art Contemporain, Grenoble; Galerie Samuel Lallouz, Montreal; Pat Hearn Gallery, New York, (with Kevin Warren), the CAPC Museum of Contemporary Art, Bordeaux, among others.

In 1988, Faust had a solo installation at the Mattress Factory, Pittsburgh. In 1991, she had a solo show at Pat Hearn gallery in New York. 1992, Faust had a one-person show at Marc Jancou Gallery, Zurich. In 2003, Faust had a solo show at greengrassi, London. During the 1990s, she had several two person collaborative shows with Kevin Warren. In 2010, Faust created a floor installation, Shroud 1 (Start) and Shroud 1 (Stop), consisting of two 13-foot diameter circles; one fabricated from sewn together rabbit pelts, and the second constructed from commercially printed camouflage fabric. The work referenced the notion of hunter and prey.

Faust has created performances that have been presented at Pat Hearn Gallery and the Mattress Factory, Faust has been represented by greengrassi gallery in London since 2003.
