= Mary Heilmann =

American contemporary artist (1940–2026)

- Heilmann in 2020
- Born: January 3, 1940; San Francisco, California, U.S.
- Died: August 14, 2026 (aged 86); Riverhead, New York, U.S.
- Education: University of California
- Known for: Painting

Mary Anne Heilmann (January 3, 1940 – August 14, 2026) was an American painter based in Manhattan and Bridgehampton in Long Island, New York. She had solo shows and traveling exhibitions at galleries including 303 Gallery (Manhattan) and Hauser & Wirth in Zurich, Switzerland, and at the Wexner Center for the Arts in Columbus, Ohio, and the New Museum on the Lower East Side in Manhattan. She has been recognized as a powerfully influential figure for younger artists.

== Early life and education ==
Heilmann was born in San Francisco on January 3, 1940. In 1947 her family moved to Los Angeles. While in Los Angeles she joined her local diving and swimming team, an activity that she devoted herself to until 1953 when her father died of cancer and the family returned to San Francisco. Her Catholic upbringing remained an influence on her life and work.

In 1959 Heilmann enrolled at the University of California, Santa Barbara. She recalled that it was “the beach, the surf, the surfers, the great shacky beach houses” which drew her there, an extension of the life she had made for herself in her late teens at San Francisco's North Beach. After graduating with a bachelor's degree in literature and minoring in art, in 1962, she attended San Francisco State College (now San Francisco State University) in 1963, in the hopes of earning a teaching credential.

While at SFSC she met Ron Nagle, an artist, and began studying ceramics in earnest, having dabbled in the medium while at UCSB. In 1965 she began studying in the master's program in ceramics and sculpture at the University of California, Berkeley, drawn as so many were to the modernist ceramicist Peter Voulkos. While there Heilmann studied not only with Voulkos, but with the sculptor and ceramicist Jim Melchert, and Karl Kasten, a painter and print-maker. During her time at Berkeley Heilmann became friends with the artist Bruce Nauman, who was a student at the University of California, Davis. Nauman introduced Heilmann to his teacher, William T. Wiley, an artist who taught her for a short time.

== Career ==
=== 1960s ===
Heilmann moved to New York City after graduating from Berkeley in 1968. She felt that both her interests and the work she was making (see Ooze, 1967) would find kinship with shows including Dick Bellamy's Arp to Artschwager Show at Noah Goldowski Gallery; Lucy Lippard’s Eccentric Abstraction at Fischbach Gallery; and the Primary Structures Show at the Jewish Museum. But at some venues fellowship was not to be. Heilmann was excluded from a number of shows from the era, with 1969’s Anti-Illusion at the Whitney Museum of American Art being particularly crushing. That rejection led Heilmann away from working in sculpture (see The Big Dipper, 1969) and towards painting. She chose not to embrace the Color Field painting of the moment, and instead produced what she called a "materials-based sort of conceptual, anti-aesthetic, earth-colored, ironic painting that was often hard to look at". Her move into painting had her further experimenting with new spontaneous and casual styles, techniques and mediums, bright colors, drips, flatness, and unusual biomorphic geometries. The early paintings were, in her view, devoid of emotional content, possessed of a non-inflected, pure color. For Heilmann the goal was a painting which eschewed craft and seduction, and was instead "tough" and "plain".

She placed her work in the tradition of geometric painting—though she also said that "abstraction" is a perfectly suitable term as well—and saw herself in conversation with Kazmir Malevich, Piet Mondrian, Josef Albers, and Ellsworth Kelly.

=== 1970s ===
One of Heilmann's earliest successes as a young painter was her 1972 inclusion in the Annual Exhibition at the Whitney Museum of American Art, where she exhibited a red monochrome piece entitled The Closet, also known as Ties in My Closet. She outlined her process:

When I make a painting, I'm like a kid stacking blocks; I push the shapes around in my mind, I count. It's a way to begin. I was a potter first, and that's an activity that also depends upon geometry, a round topological geometry of surfaces and spirals. Then I was a sculptor. I became a painter in the early '70s, but my orientation has always been that of someone who builds things.

Heilmann's work was included in the 1971 exhibition Twenty Six Contemporary Women Artists held at The Aldrich Contemporary Art Museum and the 2022 exhibition 52 Artists: A Feminist Milestone also at the Aldrich. From 1976 until 1981she was a regular in exhibitions at New York's influential Holly Solomon Gallery, with two solo shows there during that time (1976's The Vent Series and 1978's New Paintings).In 1977 Heilmann moved to the neighborhood that is now known as TriBeCa (Triangle Below Canal), having previously lived in SoHo and Chinatown. But her time there was short, as Gordon Matta-Clark died in August 1978, this was a turning-point moment for Heilmann. The "family" that she had formed in New York City—including Matta-Clark, Norman Fisher (who died in 1977), Keith Sonnier, Liza Bear, Jackie Winsor, and Suzie Harris, among others—dispersed after Matta-Clark's death. Heilmann returned to San Francisco. While there she painted The End, an homage to her friendship with Matta-Clark and Fisher and a requiem for the life she once had in Manhattan. Regarding the time she lived in San Francisco, she said:

Now the work came from a different place. Instead of working out of the dogma of modernist, non-image formalism, I began to see that the choices in the work depended more on the content for their meaning. It was the end of modernism, and though I hadn't heard the news, the beginning of postmodernism. It was a big minute for me. Everything would be different.

Heilmann returned to New York in 1979, the same year she finished Save the Last Dance for Me, a painting which symbolized a break between the work she made before 1979 and the more mature work she produced after that.

=== 1980s ===
However, Heilmann's return coincided with what she felt was a sort of painting in exile. Having given up drugs and alcohol after Suzie Harris's death, Heilmann no longer believed she had a place in New York's Downtown scene. Although she made a number of artistic breakthroughs during this time, notably the painting Rosebud (1983), she did not recover her sense of place in the New York City art world until she met the gallerist Pat Hearn in 1986. Hearn represented her by and gave her a show at the gallery later in 1986.

=== 1990s ===
Heilmann "abandoned" her picture of herself as an outsider entering the 1990s, moving up the art world ranks with Jack Pierson, Ross Bleckner, and David Reed. Younger artists like Jessica Stockholder and Lari Pittman looked up to Heilmann. No longer longing to be "alienated", she embraced that she had become part of the establishment, what she saw as a sort of return to her roots. She called it a place of the "Catholic middle class of schoolteachers, engineers, cops, and nurses". Since the 1990s Heilmann's influence among a younger generation of painters has grown. The curator Elizabeth Armstrong observed that Heilmann has "played a significant role in the revival of painting, especially on the West Coast, where former students such Ingrid Calame, Laura Owens, and Monique Prieto were helping to reinvigorate painting for a new generation". In 1995 Heilmann moved her studio from a TriBeCa loft to a farm in the town of Bridgehampton on Long Island. With the purchase of the house and the subsequent shift away from the city, Heilmann's work returned to its earlier emphasis on the importance water and the ocean, as was evident not only in the titles she chose for her paintings, but in her palette and use of wave imagery.

=== 2000s ===
Rompecabeza Uno, 2000, Acrylic on Panel (8 parts), 28" x 26"

Since the early 2000s, there has been an increased interest in Heilmann's work with solo shows at Whitechapel Gallery in London, 303 Gallery in Manhattan, and Hauser & Wirth in Zurich. She received grants from the National Endowment for the Arts, the Guggenheim Foundation, and an Anonymous Was a Woman award in 2006. Perhaps most importantly, Heilmann was welcomed into the art historical canon with her 2007-2008 retrospective, To Be Someone. The show began at the Orange County Museum of Art in Newport Beach, California, and travelled to the Contemporary Arts Museum Houston, the Wexner Center for the Arts in Columbus, Ohio, with its final stop at the New Museum in Manhattan. Writing in the New York Times the art critic Ken Johnson concluded that: "A part of Ms. Heilmann rebels against the elevation of fine art over the applied arts and resists the separation of art and life. The furniture and dishes reveal an expansive impulse to produce a holistic world…she continues to funnel her most ambitious energies into the concentrative art of painting and in doing so she achieves states of grace that are harder won than they look."

During the 2000s, Heilmann returned to a connection she had with ceramics, producing cups, plates, and saucers with the artist Steve Keister, reincorporating the vessels into her art. Beginning in 2002 Heilmann expanded her interests and began making furniture, specifically the creation of simple yet vibrantly colorful chairs (plywood and nylon), what she called "home arts". Heilmann's furniture making follows in the tradition of artists like Donald Judd and Franz West, however in having the chairs speak with and relate to the paintings Heilmann engaged with them not merely as objects to be sat on but rather works of art installed in conversation with the paintings themselves. She said, "I have designed the chairs to fit in sculpturally and pictorially with the look and feel of the rest of my work. Sometimes I even make a painting and a chair to work well together."

=== 2010s ===
In 2016 a retrospective of Heilmann's work was held at the Whitechapel Gallery in London.

=== 2020s ===
Heilmann's work was included in the 2021 exhibition Women in Abstraction at the Centre Pompidou. Her work was included in the 2024 exhibition Making Their Mark: Works from the Shah Garg Collection at the Berkeley Art Museum and Pacific Film Archive (BAMPFA).

From April 2025 to April 2026, The Whitney Museum held a solo exhibition of Heilmann's work titled Mary Heilmann: Long Line which was curated by Laura Phipps. This exhibition included a hand-painted enlargement of her painting Long Line, 2020, and a variety of her colorful chairs which are intended to relate to her painting.

== Death ==
Heilmann died at a hospital in Riverhead, New York, on August 14, 2026, at the age of 86. Her death was due to complications from a recent fall.

== Public collections ==
=== Museums ===
- AD&A Museum, UC Santa Barbara, California
- Art Institute of Chicago
- Brooklyn Museum, New York
- Cantor Arts Center at Stanford University, California
- Cincinnati Art Museum, Ohio
- Cleveland Museum of Art, Ohio
- de Young Fine Arts Museums, San Francisco
- Hammer Museum, Los Angeles
- High Museum of Art, Atlanta
- Musée de Grenoble (The Museum of Grenoble), France
- Museum of Contemporary Art, Chicago
- Museum of Modern Art, New York
- Museum De Pont (De Pont Museum of Contemporary Art), Tilburg, Netherlands
- National Academy of Design, New York
- National Gallery of Art, Washington, D.C.
- Orange County Museum of Art, Newport Beach, California
- Pennsylvania Academy of the Fine Arts, Philadelphia
- Rose Art Museum, Waltham, Massachusetts
- San Diego Museum of Art, California
- Smithsonian American Art Museum, Washington, D.C.
- Städel Museum, Frankfurt, Germany
- Whitney Museum of American Art, New York
