= George Backer =

American journalist and politician

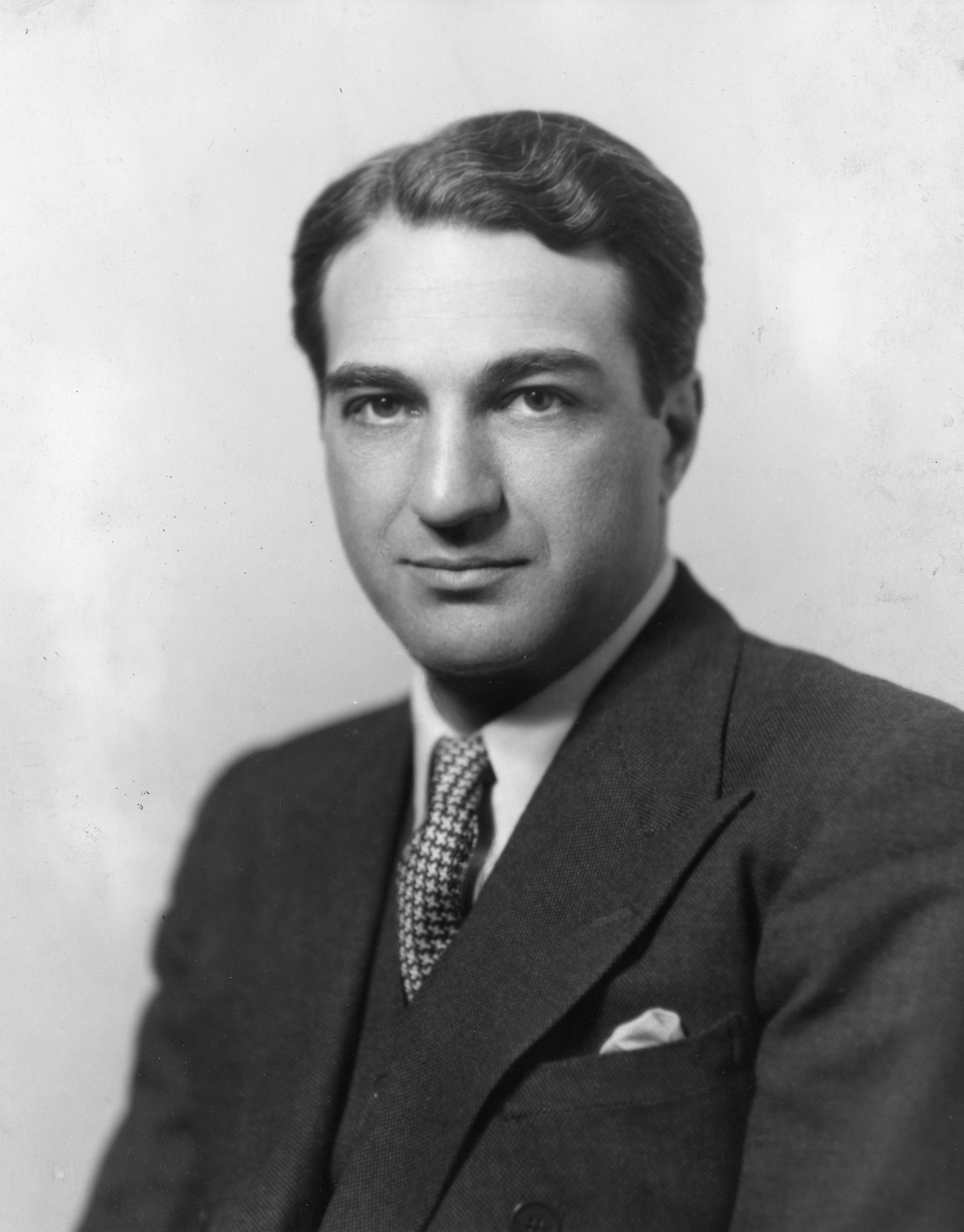
- Portrait by Converse Studios c. 1930s

Member of the New York City Council from Manhattan At-Large
- In office December 6, 1938 – December 31, 1939
- Preceded by: Baruch Charney Vladeck
- Succeeded by: Multi-member district

Personal details
- Born: January 18, 1902 New York City, U.S.
- Died: May 1, 1974 (aged 72) New York City, U.S.
- Party: Democratic; American Labor
- Spouse(s): Dorothy Schiff (m. 1932; div. 1943) Evelyn Weil (m. 1946; died 1971)
- Children: Sarah-Ann, Pat
- Education: University of Pennsylvania
- Occupation: Journalist, politician

George Backer Jr. (January 18, 1902 – May 1, 1974) was a Jewish-American playwright, novelist, journalist and politician who published the New York Post from 1939 to 1942 and served on the New York City Council from 1938 to 1939, representing Manhattan. From 1932 to 1943 he was married to Dorothy Schiff, with whom he co-owned the Post.

== Biography ==
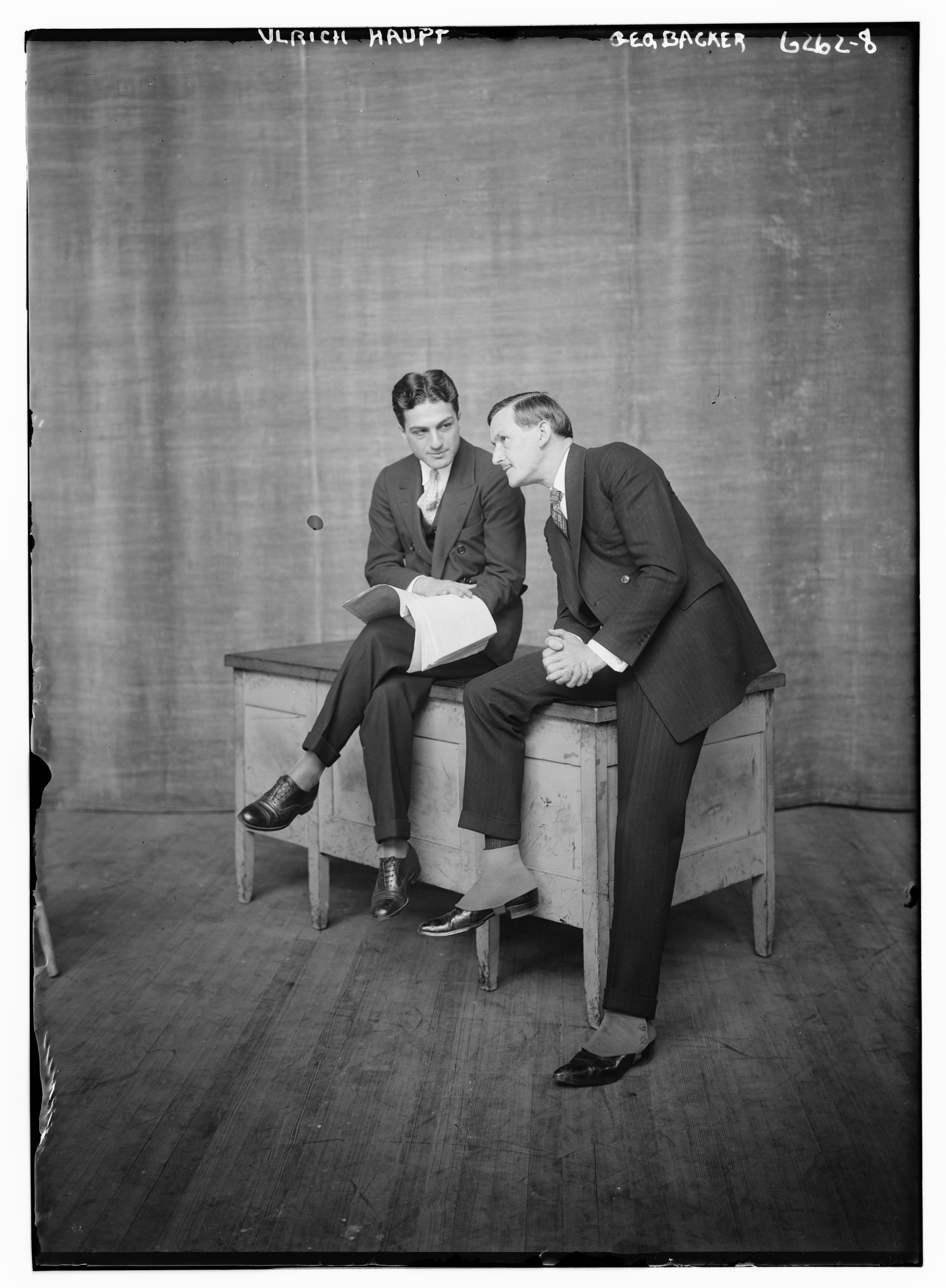
Backer (left) with actor Ullrich Haupt in 1924. The two worked together on The Great Music Company.

The son of a Russian emigrant who became a wealthy builder in Manhattan, Backer graduated from the University of Pennsylvania and tried his hand at several careers before becoming a playwright and producing several Broadway plays. Although he spent most of his life as a Democrat, he joined the American Labor Party shortly after its founding and was its candidate for New York's 17th congressional district in 1937 and 1938. After the death of City Councilman Baruch Charney Vladeck, Backer was chosen by the ALP to succeed him. He was sworn in on December 6, 1938, and served until the end of 1939. He did not run for re-election.

In the 1930s, Backer supported Franklin D. Roosevelt in his election campaigns, and traveled to Europe on several occasions to help Jews flee Nazi Germany. During World War II, he served as propaganda policy director for the Office of War Information. In addition to his work with the Post, he served as president of the American ORT Federation from 1938 to 1950 (also succeeding Vladeck) and as president of the Jewish Telegraphic Agency from 1935 to 1950.

Backer died on May 1, 1974, in Columbia Presbyterian Medical Center in Manhattan.

== Works ==
- The Deadly Parallel. New York: Random House, 1950.
- Appearance of a Man. New York: Random House, 1966.
