= Stanley Kunitz =

American poet (1905–2006)

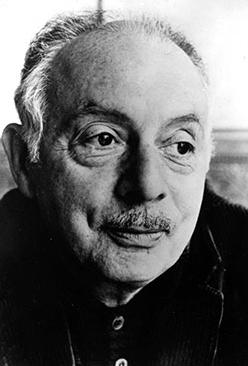
- Born: Stanley Jasspon Kunitz; July 28, 1905; Worcester, Massachusetts, U.S.
- Died: May 14, 2006 (aged 100); New York City, U.S.
- Education: Harvard University (BA, MA)
- Occupation: Poet
- Spouses: Helen Pearce (m. 1930; div. 1937) Elanor Evans (m. 1937; div. 1958) Elise Asher (m. 1958; died 2004)
- Writing career
- Notable awards: National Book Award (1995); Robert Frost Medal (1998)

Stanley Jasspon Kunitz (/ˈkjuːnɪts/; July 28, 1905 – May 14, 2006) was an American poet. He was appointed Poet Laureate Consultant in Poetry to the Library of Congress twice, first in 1974 and then again in 2000.

== Biography ==
Kunitz was born in Worcester, Massachusetts, the youngest of three children, to Yetta Helen (née Jasspon) and Solomon Z. Kunitz, both of Jewish Russian Lithuanian descent.

Six weeks before Stanley's birth, his father, who was a dressmaker, went bankrupt and committed suicide in Elm Park in Worcester by drinking carbolic acid. His mother removed every trace of Kunitz's father from the household. The death of his father would be a powerful influence on Kunitz's life.

Kunitz and his two older sisters, Sarah and Sophia, were raised by his mother, who had made her way from Yashwen, Kovno, Lithuania by herself in 1890, and opened a dry goods store. She remarried in 1910 to Mark Dine. The couple filed for bankruptcy in 1912 and then were indicted by the U.S. District Court for concealing assets. They pleaded guilty and turned over US$10,500 to the trustees. Mark Dine died when Kunitz was fourteen; he had a heart attack while hanging curtains.

At fifteen, Kunitz moved out of the house and became a butcher's assistant. Later he got a job as a cub reporter on The Worcester Telegram, where he continued working during his summer vacations from college.

Kunitz graduated summa cum laude in 1926 from Harvard College with an English major and a philosophy minor, and then earned a master's degree in English from Harvard the following year. He wanted to continue his studies for a doctorate degree, but was told by the university that the Anglo-Saxon students would not like to be taught by a Jew.

After Harvard, he worked as a reporter for The Worcester Telegram, and as editor for the H. W. Wilson Company in New York City. He then founded and edited Wilson Library Bulletin and started the Author Biographical Studies. Kunitz married Helen Pearce in 1930; they divorced in 1937. In 1935 he moved to New Hope, Pennsylvania and befriended Theodore Roethke. He married Eleanor Evans in 1939; they had a daughter Gretchen in 1950. Kunitz divorced Eleanor in 1958.

At Wilson Company, Kunitz served as co-editor for Twentieth Century Authors, among other reference works. In 1931, as Dilly Tante, he edited Living Authors, a Book of Biographies. His poems began to appear in Poetry, Commonweal, The New Republic, The Nation, and The Dial.

During World War II, he was drafted into the Army in 1943 as a conscientious objector, and after undergoing basic training three times, served as a noncombatant at Gravely Point, Washington in the Air Transport Command in charge of information and education. He refused a commission and was discharged with the rank of staff sergeant.

After the war, he began a peripatetic teaching career at Bennington College (1946–1949), taking over from Roethke. He subsequently taught at the State University of New York at Potsdam (then the New York State Teachers College at Potsdam) as a full professor (1949–1950; summer sessions through 1954), the New School for Social Research (lecturer; 1950–1957), the University of Washington (visiting professor; 1955–1956), Queens College (visiting professor; 1956–1957), Brandeis University (poet-in-residence; 1958–1959) and Columbia University (lecturer in the School of General Studies; 1963–1966) before spending 18 years as an adjunct professor of writing at Columbia's School of the Arts (1967–1985). Throughout this period, he also held visiting appointments at Yale University (1970), Rutgers University–Camden (1974), Princeton University (1978) and Vassar College (1981).

After his divorce from Eleanor, he married the painter and poet Elise Asher in 1958. His marriage to Asher led to friendships with artists like Philip Guston and Mark Rothko.

Kunitz's poetry won wide praise for its profundity and quality. He was the New York State Poet Laureate from 1987 to 1989. He continued to write and publish until his centenary year, as late as 2005. Many consider that his poetry's symbolism is influenced significantly by the work of Carl Jung. Kunitz influenced many 20th-century poets, including James Wright, Mark Doty, Louise Glück, Joan Hutton Landis, and Carolyn Kizer.

For most of his life, Kunitz divided his time between New York City and Provincetown, Massachusetts. He enjoyed gardening and maintained one of the most impressive seaside gardens in Provincetown. There he also founded Fine Arts Work Center, where he was a mainstay of the literary community, as he was of Poets House in Manhattan.

He was awarded the Peace Abbey Courage of Conscience award in Sherborn, Massachusetts in October 1998 for his contribution to the liberation of the human spirit through his poetry.

He died in 2006 at his home in Manhattan. He had previously come close to death, and reflected on the experience in his last book, a collection of essays, The Wild Braid: A Poet Reflects on a Century in the Garden.

== Poetry ==
Kunitz's first collection of poems, Intellectual Things, was published in 1930. His second volume of poems, Passport to the War, was published fourteen years later; the book went largely unnoticed, although it featured some of Kunitz's best-known poems, and soon fell out of print. Kunitz's confidence was not in the best of shape when, in 1959, he had trouble finding a publisher for his third book, Selected Poems: 1928-1958. Despite this unflattering experience, the book, eventually published by Little Brown, received the Pulitzer Prize for Poetry.

The Testing-Tree (excerpt)

In a murderous time
the heart breaks and breaks
and lives by breaking.
It is necessary to go
through dark and deeper dark
and not to turn.

— Stanley Kunitz

His next volume of poems would not appear until 1971, but Kunitz remained busy through the 1960s editing reference books and translating Russian poets. When twelve years later The Testing Tree appeared, Kunitz's style was radically transformed from the highly intellectual and philosophical musings of his earlier work to more deeply personal yet disciplined narratives; moreover, his lines shifted from iambic pentameter to a freer prosody based on instinct and breath—usually resulting in shorter stressed lines of three or four beats.

Throughout the 70s and 80s, he became one of the most treasured and distinctive voices in American poetry. His collection Passing Through: The Later Poems won the National Book Award for Poetry in 1995. Kunitz received many other honors, including a National Medal of Arts, the Bollingen Prize for a lifetime achievement in poetry, the Robert Frost Medal, and Harvard's Centennial Medal. He served two terms as Consultant on Poetry for the Library of Congress (the precursor title to Poet Laureate), one term as Poet Laureate of the United States, and one term as the State Poet of New York. He founded the Fine Arts Work Center in Provincetown, Massachusetts, and Poets House in New York City. Kunitz also acted as a judge for the Yale Series of Younger Poets Competition.

== Library Bill of Rights ==
Kunitz served as editor of the Wilson Library Bulletin from 1928 to 1943. An outspoken critic of censorship, in his capacity as editor, he targeted his criticism at librarians who did not actively oppose it. He published an article in 1938 by Bernard Berelson entitled "The Myth of Library Impartiality". This article led Forrest Spaulding and the Des Moines Public Library to draft the Library Bill of Rights, which was later adopted by the American Library Association and continues to serve as the cornerstone document on intellectual freedom in libraries.

== Awards and honors ==
- 2006 L.L. Winship/PEN New England Award, The Wild Braid: A Poet Reflects on a Century in the Garden

== Bibliography ==
=== Poetry ===
- The Wild Braid: A Poet Reflects on a Century in the Garden (2005)
- The Collected Poems of Stanley Kunitz (W. W. Norton, 2000)
- Passing Through: the Later Poems, New and Selected (W. W. Norton, 1995) — winner of the National Book Award
- Next-to-Last Things: New Poems and Essays (1985)
- The Wellfleet Whale and Companion Poems (1983)
- The Poems of Stanley Kunitz, 1928–1978 (1979)
- The Terrible Threshold: Selected poems, 1940-1970 (1974)
- The Coat without a Seam: sixty poems, 1930-1972 (1974)
- The Testing-Tree (1971)
- Selected Poems, 1928-1958 (1958)
- Passport to the War (1944)
- Intellectual Things (1930)

=== Other writing and interviews ===
- Conversations with Stanley Kunitz (Jackson, MS: University Press of Mississippi, Literary Conversations Series, 11/2013), Edited by Kent P. Ljungquist
- A Kind of Order, A Kind of Folly: Essays and Conversations
- Interviews and Encounters with Stanley Kunitz (Riverdale-on-Hudson, NY: The Sheep Meadow Press, 1995), Edited by Stanley Moss
- A Feast of Losses: Yetta Dine and Her Son, the Poet Stanley Kunitz (Cambridge, MA: TidePool Press, 2023, ISBN 978-1-7367720-6-5), Author Judith Ferrara

=== As editor, translator, or co-translator ===
- The Essential Blake
- Orchard Lamps by Ivan Drach
- Story under full sail by Andrei Voznesensky
- Poems of John Keats
- Poems of Akhmatova by Max Hayward
