= Nanno de Groot =

American painter

- Born: Nanno Freerk de Groot; March 23, 1913; Balkbrug, Netherlands
- Died: December 26, 1963 (aged 50); Provincetown Massachusetts, U.S.
- Known for: Painting
- Movement: New York Figurative Expressionism; Abstract expressionism
- Spouse(s): Elise Asher (m. 1948; div. 1957) Pat Richardson (m. 1958)

Nanno Freerk de Groot (March 23, 1913 – December 26, 1963) was a Dutch artist, he was self-taught and active in New York City. He belonged to the group of New York School Abstract expressionist artists of the 1950s.

== Biography ==
Nanno de Groot was born March 23, 1913, in Balkbrug, Netherlands. De Groot started drawing at six years of age, his father prevented him from studying art when he was young.

In 1930–1933 he went to the nautical school in Amsterdam, Netherlands. After graduation he received third mate and radio operator's papers. From 1937 to 1941 he worked in the shipping business and lived on the island of Bali. In 1941 he was called for submarine duty by the Dutch Navy and was assigned to Admiral's headquarters on Java where he stayed until the arrival of the Japanese. He was then sent to San Francisco, California, USA to serve as liaison officer to the United States Army and United States Navy in charge of running troop ships between the west coast and the western Pacific, chartered by the United States. He was Lieutenant Commander in charge of the Dutch Port Authority in San Francisco. The position discontinued in 1946. He applied for US citizenship, and became a US citizen in 1954.

== Artistic career ==
In 1946 at age 33, he discovered Pablo Picasso and he dedicated the rest of his life to painting and drawing. He worked for a year as a cartoonist for the San Francisco Chronicle. After his marriage to the New York School artist Elise Asher in 1948 de Groot settled in New York on West 12th Street. He and Elise Asher divorced in 1957, and he subsequently married painter Patricia Richardson (also known as Pat de Groot).

Nanno de Groot became connected to the pioneers of the New York School. De Groot considered himself an American artist and part of the abstract expressionist movement. He participated from 1954 to 1957 in the invitational New York Painting and Sculpture Annuals These Annuals were important because the participants were chosen by the artists themselves.

Nanno de Groot died on December 26, 1963, in Provincetown, Massachusetts, from lung cancer. He was survived by his wife Pat de Groot, who created his unique tombstone found at Provincetown’s municipal cemetery.

== Solo exhibitions ==
- 1952 : Saidenberg Gallery, New York City, New York;
- 1954, 55: Bertha Schaefer Gallery, New York City, New York;
- 1956, 59, 60, 61, 64 (memorial): HCE Gallery, Provincetown, Massachusetts;
- 1957, 58, 59, 61: Parma Gallery, New York City, New York;
- 1960: October, Stamford Museum & Nature Center, Stamford, Connecticut;
- 1971: Jack Gregory Gallery, Provincetown, Massachusetts;
- 1982: Provincetown Art Association and Museum, Provincetown, Massachusetts;
- 1987–2003: Julie Heller Gallery, Provincetown, Massachusetts.
- 2007: NANNO de GROOT: EARTH, SEA & SKY at ACME Fine Art, Boston, Massachusetts

== Group exhibitions ==
- 1953 Saidenberg Gallery, New York City, New York;
- 1953 Hansa Gallery, New York City, New York;
- 1954, 55: Tanager Gallery, New York City, New York;
- 1954, 55, 56, 57: Ncw York Painting and Sculpture Annuals at the Stable Gallery, New York City, New York;
- 1962, 63: HCE Provincetown, Massachusetts;
- 1953–1964: Provincetown Art Association and Museum, Provincetown, Massachusetts
- 1982: Everson Museum of Art "Provincetown Painters" principal collections, Syracuse, New York;
- 1994: "Reclaiming Artists of the New York School. Toward a More Inclusive View of the 1950s," Baruch College, City University, New York City, New York; "New York-Provincetown: A 50's Connection," Provincetown Art Association and Museum, Provincetown, Massachusetts; Anita Shapolsky Gallery, New York City, New York;
- 1987–2003: Julie Heller Gallery, Provincetown, Massachusetts.

== Collections ==
- Hirshhorn Museum and Sculpture Garden, Washington D.C.
- Museum of Fine Arts, Boston, Massachusetts
- Chrysler Museum of Art, Provincetown, Massachusetts
- Hebrew University, Jerusalem, Israel
- Provincetown Art Association and Museum, Provincetown, Massachusetts
- Olsen Foundation, Guilford, Connecticut
- Kresge Art Museum, Michigan State University, East Lansing, Michigan

== Quote ==
"In moments of clarity of thought I can sustain the idea that everything on earth is nature, including that which springs forth from a man's mind, and hand. A Franz Kline is nature as much as a zinnia."

== See also ==
- New York School
- Action painting
- Abstract expressionism
- Expressionism
- American Figurative Expressionism

== Catalogs which include Nanno de Groot ==
- Nanno De Groot : 1913–1963, the New York years : 9 September-9 October 2004 (Boston : Acme Fine Art and Design, 2004.)
- Nanno de Groot : a retrospective exhibition, May 28 – June 30, 1982 (Provincetown : Provincetown Art Association & Museum, ©1982)
- Paintings and Sculpture (Tanager Gallery New York, 1956)
- Linda Lindeberg, Nanno de Groot : Bertha Schaefer (New York : The Gallery, [1951])
- Rockford Art Museum Reuniting an Era abstract expressionists of the 1950s Rockford Art Museum, Rockford, Illinois November 12, 2004 – January 25, 2005

== Books ==
- Marika Herskovic, American Abstract and Figurative Expressionism: Style Is Timely Art Is Timeless (New York School Press, 2009.) ISBN 978-0-9677994-2-1. pp. 68–71
- Marika Herskovic, American Abstract Expressionism of the 1950s An Illustrated Survey, (New York School Press, 2003.) ISBN 0-9677994-1-4. pp. 86–89
- Marika Herskovic, New York School Abstract Expressionists Artists Choice by Artists, (New York School Press, 2000.) ISBN 0-9677994-0-6. p. p. 31; p. 36;
