= Balkbrug =

- Village
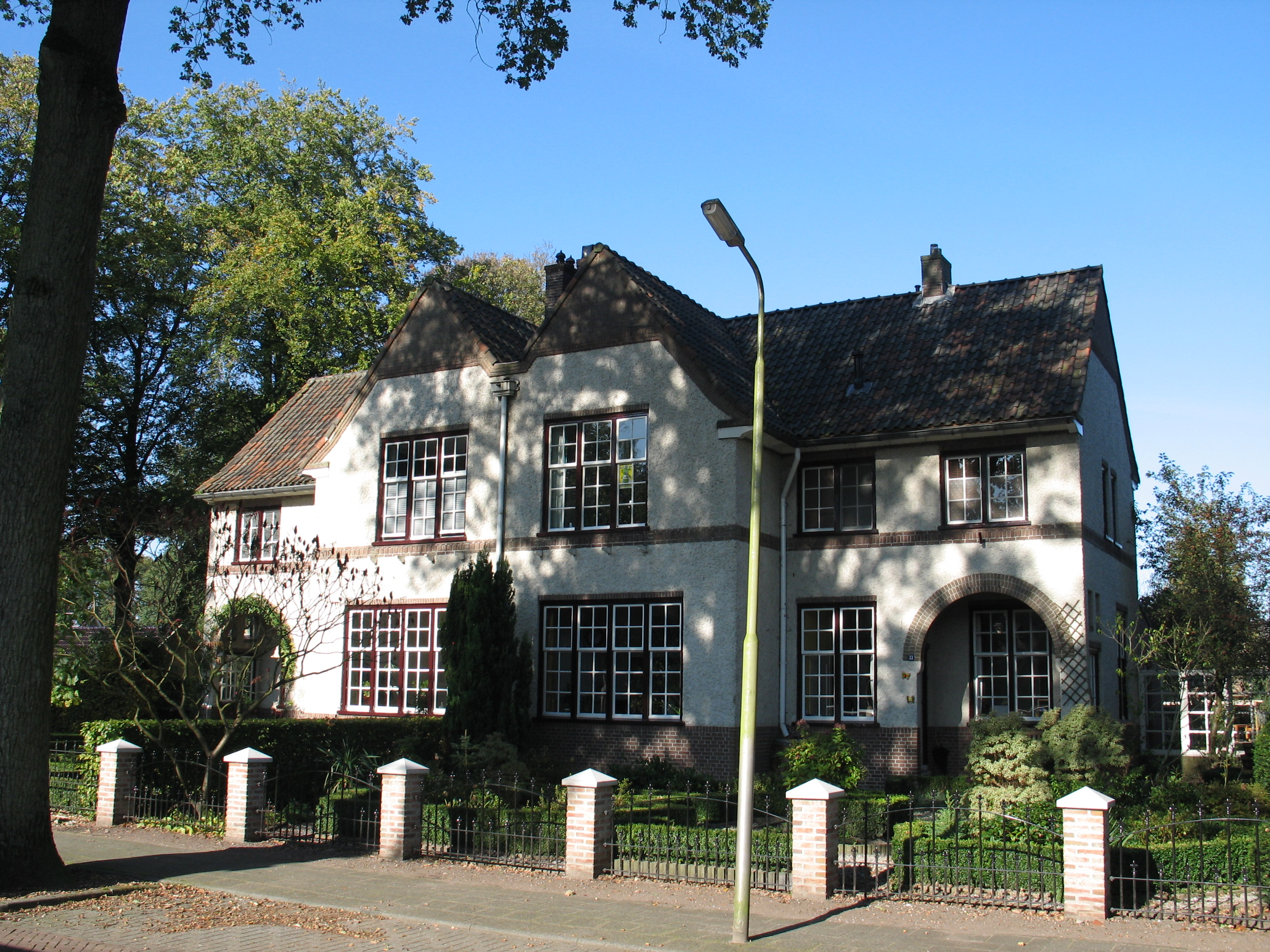
- House in Balkbrug

- Location in province of Overijssel in the Netherlands Balkbrug (Netherlands)
- Coordinates: 52°36′2″N 6°23′28″E
- Country: Netherlands
- Province: Overijssel
- Municipality: Hardenberg

Area
  - Total: 39.26 km^{2} (15.16 sq mi)
- Elevation: 7 m (23 ft)

Population (2021)
  - Total: 3,980
  - Density: 101/km^{2} (263/sq mi)
- Time zone: UTC+1 (CET)
  - Summer (DST): UTC+2 (CEST)
- Postal code: 7707
- Dialing code: 0523

Balkbrug is a village in the Dutch province of Overijssel. It is located in the municipality Hardenberg, about 5 km west of Dedemsvaart.

== History ==
Balkbrug is located where the road from Ommen splits into a road to Meppel and Leeuwarden, and a road to Hoogeveen and the city of Groningen. In 1599, a redoubt was constructed in Ommerschans, south of Balkbrug. The village appeared in 1811 along the Dedemsvaart as part of a peat colony. It is named after a simple type of bridge. In 1819, a beggar's colony was founded to the south of the village. In 1840, it was home to 1,308 people. The church was built in 1896.

In 1893/94, the beggar's colony was turned into the state educational institution Veldzicht, a prison for young offenders. In 1911, it was enlarged and became the largest in the Netherlands. Nowadays, it is used as the forensic psychiatry centre.

In January 2025 inhabitants of Balkbrug won the Dutch Postcode Lottery main prize of €59.7 million.

== Notable people ==
- Nanno de Groot (1913–1963), American autodidact artist.

== Gallery ==
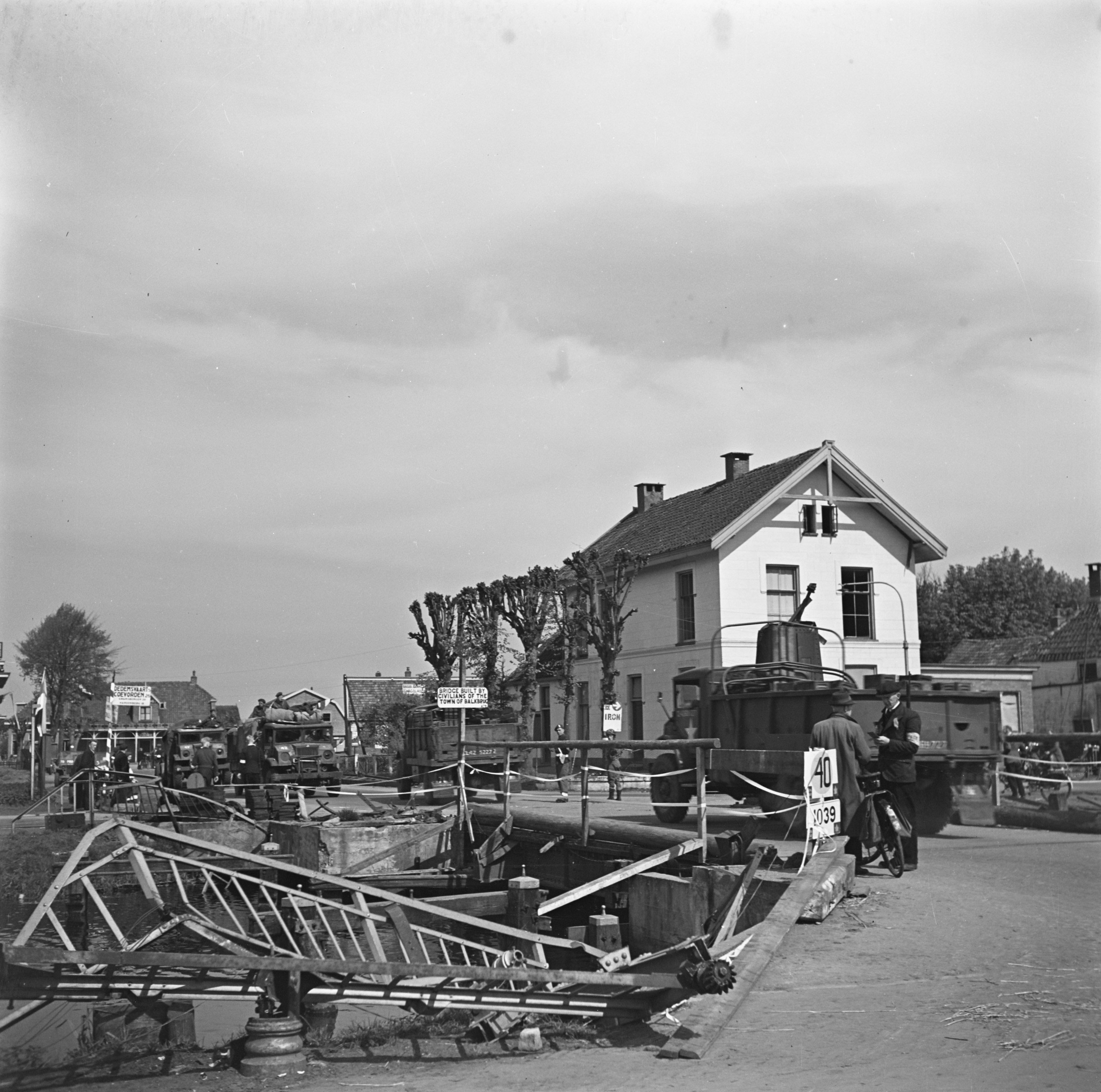
Provisionally repaired bridge (1945)

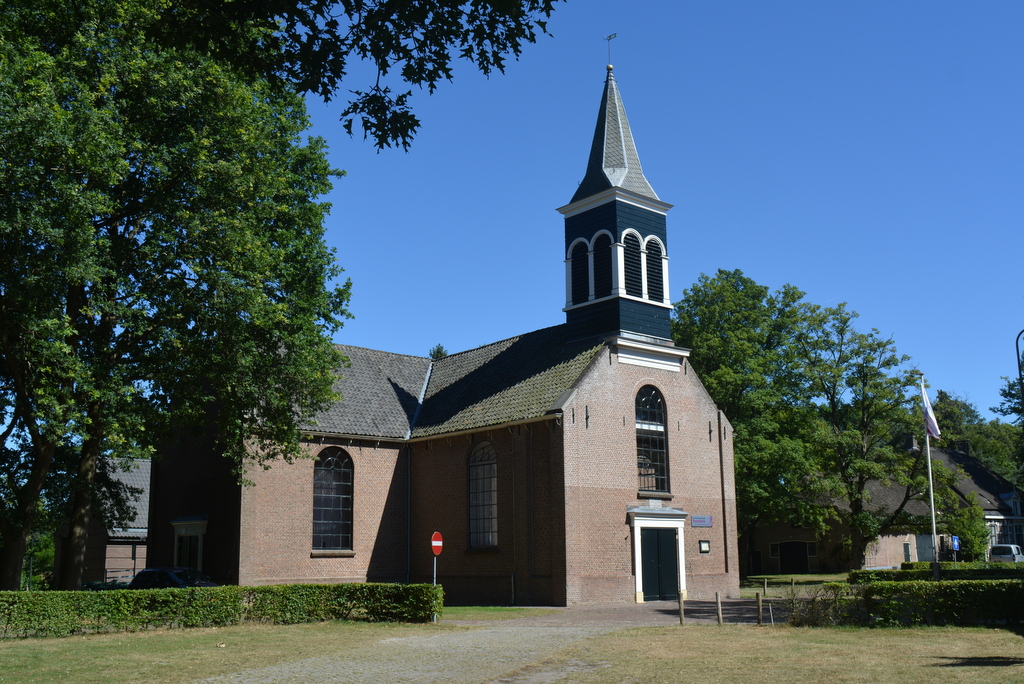
Church of Balkbrug

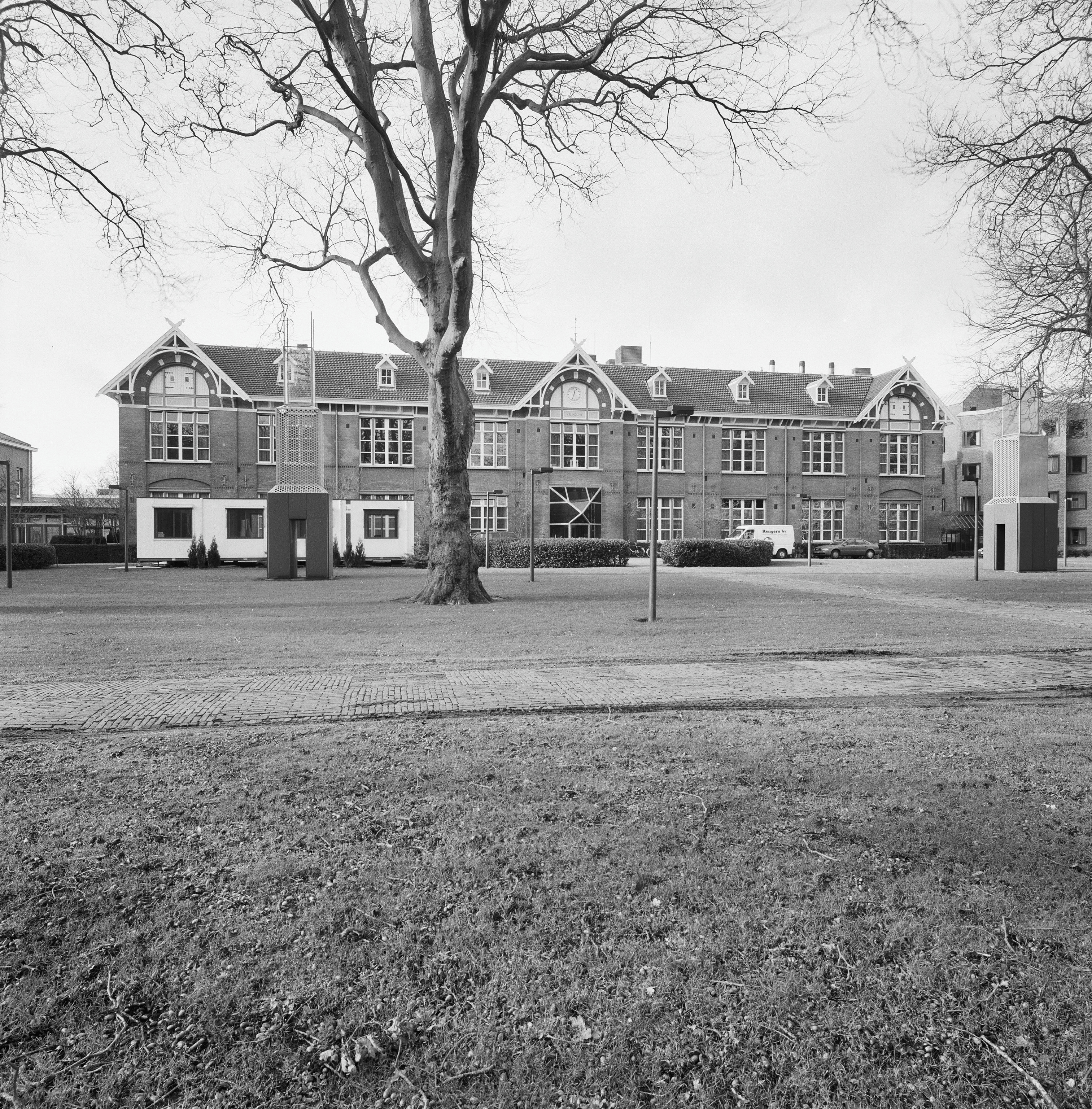
Veldzicht
