= Pat de Groot =

English-born American painter (1930–2018)

- Born: Patricia Richardson; June 14, 1930; St John’s Wood, London, England
- Died: July 26, 2018 (aged 88); Brewster, Massachusetts, U.S.
- Other name: Patricia de Groot
- Education: University of Pennsylvania
- Occupations: Painter, illustrator, book designer
- Years active: 1974–2018 (for painting)
- Spouse: Nanno de Groot (m. 1958; died 1963)
- Relatives: George Backer (stepfather)

Pat de Groot (née Patricia Richardson; 1930–2018) was an English-born American painter and illustrator. She lived in Provincetown, Massachusetts for many years, and was noted for her oil paintings and drawings of seascapes and birds.

== Early life and education ==
Pat de Groot was born as Patricia Richards on June 14, 1930, in St John’s Wood, London, England, to parents Evelyn "Evie" Straus Weil and Ernald W. A. Richardson. She was the great granddaughter of Isidor Straus. Her mother Evelyn Weil worked as an interior designer, with clients such as Truman Capote. Her father Ernald W. A. Richardson came from high social class, and served in the Queen's Regiment. Her parents divorced when she was a child, and in 1940 she moved to New York City, New York, United States. In 1947, her mother Eve Weil married George Backer, the publisher of the New York Post.

Richardson received a B.A. degree in 1953 in literature from the University of Pennsylvania.

== Career ==
After graduation from college, she worked with George Plimpton at The Paris Review in Paris; then moved to New York City to design book covers for the publishing company Farrar, Straus and Giroux. She had also apprenticed under the book designer Marshall Lee at the H. Wolff Book Manufacturing Company in New York City.

In 1946, Richards started making visits to Provincetown, Massachusetts. She met her future husband, painter Nanno de Groot in Provincetown in 1956, and they wed in 1958. Together they built a house in Provincetown on the Harriet Adams’ land on Commercial Street, it was completed in 1962. Months later in 1963, her husband Nanno de Groot died of lung cancer.

Her parties in Provincetown in the 1960s and 1970s attracted celebrities, musicians, and artists. Her long-term lover was jazz drummer Elvin Jones. De Groot also would rent out a room in her house in the summer to visiting creative people, such as John Waters, Philip Hoare, and painter Richard Baker.

De Groot never had formal training in fine art, and started to seriously purse the field in 1974, at the age of 44. In 2000, she had her first solo exhibition in New York City of small seascape oil paintings at the Pat Hearn Gallery. In 2002, she was awarded the Anonymous Was A Woman Award; and in 2007 she was awarded the Lee Krasner Award from Pollock-Krasner Foundation. She had a survey exhibition at the Provincetown Art Association in 2009.

She died of a stroke on July 26, 2018, in Brewster, Massachusetts, U.S.. De Groot has an artist file at the Smithsonian American Art and Portrait Gallery Library.
