= Lutz Bacher =

American artist (1943–2019)

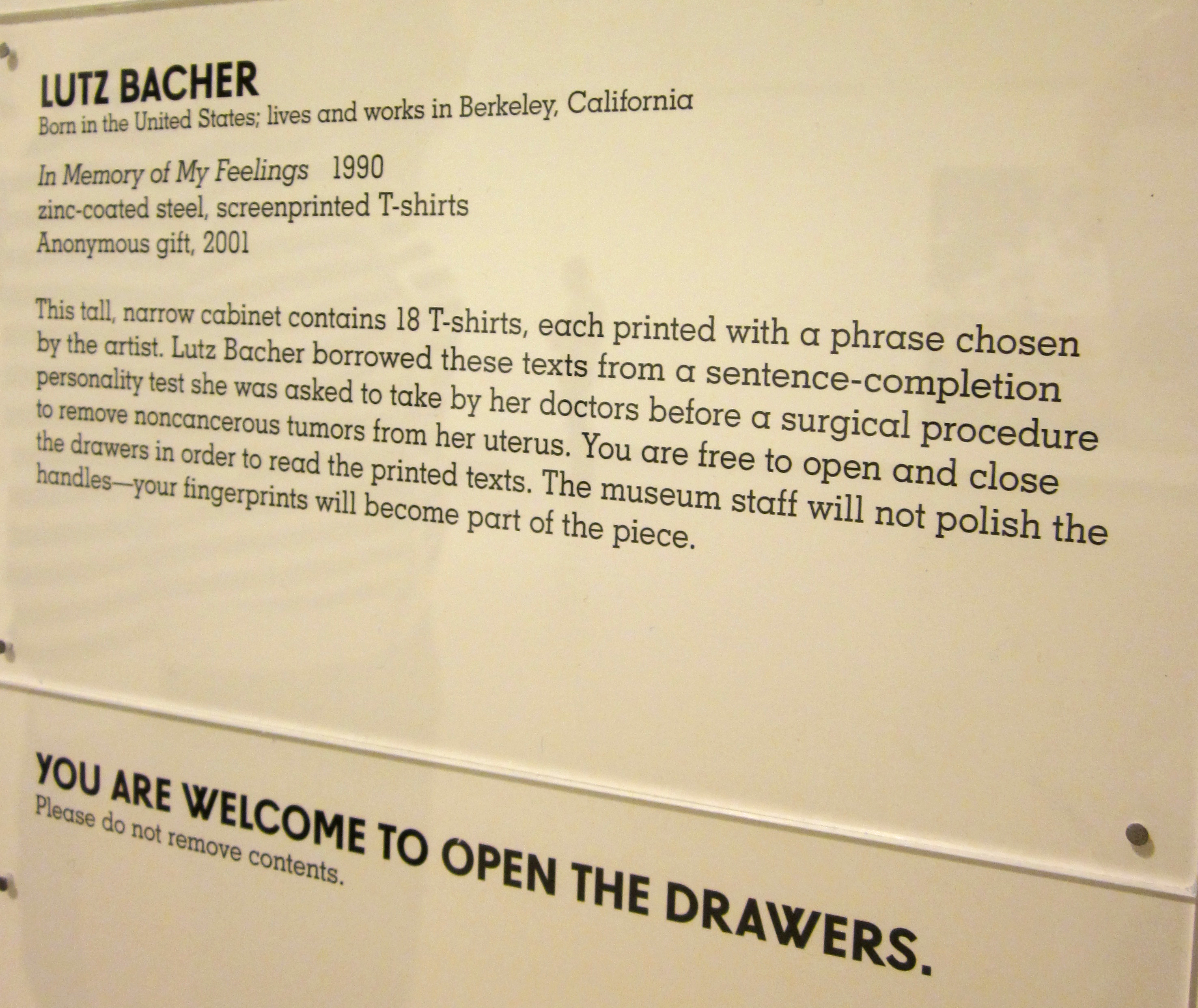
Description of Lutz Bacher's In Memory of My Feelings, 1990

Lutz Bacher (21 September 1943 – 14 May 2019) was an American artist. She was a neo-Conceptualist closely associated with Berkeley, California since the 1970s, and who lived and worked in New York City from 2013 until her death. The name Lutz Bacher was a pseudonym, and the artist did not publicly reveal a former name. She was once considered a figure with "cult" status—known for being "legendary but elusive" in the California art scene. Since the early 2000s, her work increasingly gained mainstream recognition.

Bacher was married to the astrophysicist Donald C. Backer for almost 40 years.

== Themes ==
Bacher's body of work has been described as "eclectic," "rough, open-ended," and "disturbing." It consists of works in a variety of formats, including videotapes, photographs, and other mixed media. Many of these works incorporate elements from popular culture, personal artifacts, and found objects, and address questions of identity as expressed through sexuality and the human body.

== Work ==
Among Bacher’s early work from the 1970s is ‘Men at War’ (1975), a series of photographs, based on a single image, of American sailors relaxing on a beach. The young men’s initial cordiality is eclipsed by a painted swastika on one sailor’s chest, turning the image into an allusion to incipient male violence. Bacher further examines the intersections of masculinity, violence, and power in ‘Sex with Strangers’ series (1986), which combines found pornographic images with captions written in the style of scientific study about rape. In these works, images designed to satisfy male pleasure are overturned to reveal their exploitation of the female body.

Beginning in the late 1980s, Bacher began working in video art. Her time-based 'Huge Uterus' (1989) documented a surgical procedure to have fibroid tumors removed from her uterus. Bacher's video work derives from her first-hand experiences but are not fully documentary or autobiographical. In 'Closed Circuit' (1997-2000), Bacher installed a closed-circuit camera above Pat Hearn's desk which transmitted a live feed of surveillance footage into the gallery. 'Closed Circuit' was first exhibited at the Whitney Museum of American Art after Hearn's death.

== Career ==
In 2002, Bacher received the Anonymous Was a Woman award, and she was included in the 2012 Whitney Biennial. Bacher was represented by gallerist Pat Hearn of Pat Hearn Gallery in New York, City beginning in 1993.

== Exhibitions ==
Over a 40-year career, Bacher exhibited work in numerous solo and group shows around the world, including museums and galleries in her native San Francisco Bay area such as the Berkeley Art Museum and the Ratio 3 gallery in San Francisco. Museum solo exhibitions of her work took place at: Secession, Vienna (2016); "Lutz Bacher" at the Aspen Art Museum, Colorado (2014); National Museum of Denmark, Copenhagen (2014); and Contemporary Art Museum, St. Louis (2008). In 2009, her multimedia works were featured in "MY SECRET LIFE", a retrospective, and her first museum survey exhibition, at MoMA PS1 in New York City.

Bacher was the focus of three European exhibitions in 2013: one at Portikus in Frankfurt, Germany; one at the Institute of Contemporary Arts in London, UK; and the third at Kunsthalle Zürich in Zürich, Switzerland. Those three institutions published an artist book presenting Bacher's complete oeuvre.

== Collections ==
Bacher's work is included in the following collections:

- Museum of Modern Art, New York City, New York
- Art Institute of Chicago, Chicago
- Berkeley Art Museum and Pacific Film Archive, Berkeley, California
- Metropolitan Museum of Art, New York City, New York
- San Francisco Museum of Modern Art, San Francisco, California
- Walker Art Center, Minneapolis
- Whitney Museum of American Art, New York City, New York
