= Documents: A Magazine of Contemporary Art and Visual Culture =

Documents: A Magazine of Contemporary Art and Visual Culture was a triannual arts magazine published between 1992 and 2004. The five founding editors were Chris Hoover, Miwon Kwon, James Marcovitz, Helen Molesworth and Margaret Sundell. Based out of New York City and later Los Angeles, the publication ran for twenty-three issues and employed an interdisciplinary approach to its content. According to art historian Julian Meyers the journal enabled, "new conversations among disciplines and irreverent new styles of critical writing drawn from 'marginal domains' like queer activism and punk subculture." The magazine included contributions in the form of surveys, questionnaires, reviews and artist projects from such notable figures as: T. J. Clark, Mieke Bal, Gregg Bordowitz and Tom Burr among many others. The publication is currently indexed in the Getty Research Institute's Bibliography of the History of Art and the Alternative Press Index.
