= Pat Hearn =

American art dealer

Pat Hearn (1955 – 2000) was an American art dealer, who ran Pat Hearn Gallery in New York City from 1983 until 2000. Hearn founded the Armory Show with American art dealer Colin De Land, Matthew Marks, and Paul Morris in 1994.

== Art gallery ==
Hearn championed the work of artists like Philip Taaffe, Milan Kunc, Peter Schuyff, Jutta Koether, Monique Prieto, Gretchen Faust Jeff Elrod, Susan Hiller, Renee Green, Lincoln Tobier, Ted Byfield, Pat de Groot, Simon Leung, George Condo, Jack Pierson, Mark Morrisroe, Jimmy De Sana, Mary Heilmann, Joan Jonas, Lutz Bacher, Eva Hesse, and Ana Mendieta.

In 1985, Andy Warhol cast Hearn as a naked muse, plastering her in white body paint and high-contrast lipstick for a Polaroid shoot in preparation for an iconic silkscreen portrait. In 1987, Hearn posed for Timothy Greenfield-Sanders as part of is series called Art World.

== Armory Show ==
In 1994, the Gramercy International Art Fair, now called the Armory Show, made its debut in the rooms and hallways of New York's Gramercy Park Hotel. At the time, the Fair was an alternative to the more polished and established fairs like Art Basel and Art Chicago (now Expo Chicago). Four dealers and gallerists, Pat Hearn, Colin de Land, Matthew Marks and Paul Morris, worked together to bring in a younger generation of downtown artists who were working through the recession that plagued the 1980s. A number of seminal contemporary artworks and performances debuted at the fair including Mark Dion's Lemonade Stand (1996), Andrea Fraser's Museum Highlights: A Gallery Talk (1989), May I Help You (1991), and Renée Green's The Pigskin Library (1990).

== Collection ==
Hearn died in August 2000, aged 45, of liver cancer while on vacation in Provincetown, Massachusetts.

The American Fine Arts Co. and Pat Hearn Gallery collections were acquired by The Center for Curatorial Studies at Bard College (Bard CCS), in Annandale-on-Hudson, N.Y. In 2018 Bard CCS organized the show "The Conditions of Being Art: Pat Hearn Gallery and American Fine Arts, Co. (1983–2004)" at Hessel Museum of Art on "the shared histories, art, and programming activities of Pat Hearn Gallery and American Fine Arts, Co., Colin de Land Fine Art" and published a book of the same title (Dancing Foxes Press, 2018).
