= Silvia Gruner =

Mexican artist

- Born: 1959 (age 65–66); Mexico City, Mexico
- Known for: Sculpture, Video, Performance

Silvia Gruner is a Mexican artist born to a family of Jewish Holocaust survivors.

== Biography ==
Gruner received her Fine Arts Degree from Bezalel Academy of Art & Design (1978-1982) and pursued her master's degree in Fine Arts at Massachusetts College of Art in Boston (1984-1986).

After completing her master's degree Gruner had her first solo exhibition, Conversaciones con un loto azul, (1986) in Boston. Additionally, at the beginning of her career, Gruner began making short films and video performances that she recorded using a Super 8 camera. Her work is said to be heavily influenced by second wave feminism and post conceptual work, which caused critical debate in Mexico during the 1990s. Gruner's art is unique and personal as she bases many of her pieces on her own personal experiences and culture. In addition, she explores these different ideas of nationality, identity, and feminism through many different mediums. She experiments a lot with film, photography, performance, and interactive art installations in order to appeal to a mass audience. Silvia Gruner is recognized as one of the most original artists of her time in Latin America and is praised for having created a new vocabulary in Mexican contemporary art.

== Works ==
=== La mitad del Camino/The Middle of the Road, 1994 ===
Gruner wanted to create art directly on a part of the border fence that ran between the Colonia Libertad in Tijuana and San Diego. In this art installation she installed more than 100 small figures of the Aztec goddess, Tlazoltéotl. The goddess is seen as a symbol of fertility and motherhood, hence why Gruner crafted the goddess in a position of giving birth. It is left up to interpretation as to what Tlazoltéotl, is supposed to signify here at the border as some believe it signifies rebirth and it meant to be comforting to illegal immigrants and a symbol of reassurance that those migrating will not forget their roots and culture. However, others believe that since Tlazoltéotl is stuck on the border in the middle of childbirth, it can also raise a feeling of uncertainty during this significant transitional period where you are between the know and unknown.

=== Don't fuck with the past, you might get pregnant, 1994 ===
Gruner created an installation with a series of 16 photographic prints that depict small clay figures. Each Ektacolor (chromogenic development) print measures 20x24 inches and brings the overall installation to a size of 108x96 inches. She continues to explore the theme of time in this piece and its close entanglement with Mexican culture. She explains how in the Mexican culture people are taught to look at the past in a conservative way and uses this work to address the parallel between culture and different Mexican taboos. She not only challenges this taboo but counters gender binaries by using this piece to deal with the masculine and the feminine simultaneously. In addition, Gruner purposely enters these images with a disruptive attitude in order to powerfully inhabit this unknown territory. Through the use of everyday objects she demonstrates how this piece is deeply rooted in the Mexican culture and shows not only their history but the people themselves within the art.

=== How to look at Mexican Art, 1995 ===
In How to look at Mexican Art , Gruner pictures her fingers through a punctured molcajete on top of a piece of bright red plastic. A molcajete is a stone tool used to grind different items and are typically associated with indigenous Mexican culture. Molcajetes remain popular today as they are used throughout Latin America to grind different foods. In the photographic diptych, the first picture shows her grasping the molcajete from the top and then moves to put her fingers through the hole from the bottom. Through the use of incorporating her own body in her art it shows how personal this piece is and how she is challenging her culture and Mexican heritage. Additionally, the molcajete contrasts against the bright red plastic can be seen as a contrast between the past and the modern present. The molcajete is also very significant and personal in this piece as it belonged to Gruner's childhood nana, or nursemaid which shows how it has been used by various women and is full of tradition. The ambiguity in this piece is meant to leave viewers with the expectations of typical 'Mexican Art'.

=== Centinela (Sentinel), 2007 ===
Centinela is a video in which the artist has her head shaved from recent cancer treatments and stands in front of a modernist fountain created by Mathias Goeritz, Ricardo Legorreta, and Isamu Noguchi. Gruner explains how in this piece nothing really happens but simultaneously everything happens. In the video, the subject remains still, completely immobile yet everything in her surroundings continue. The water continues to thrust back and forth, the cars continue to pass by, the environment is dynamic. Once again, through the inclusion of herself in her own work it shows how Gruner explores her own personal life and in this case deals with the emotions of her battle with cancer. Additionally, the title 'Sentinel' refers to a soldier who stands to keep watch as she is doing in the video.

=== Hemisferios/Hemispheres, 2016 ===
Silvia Gruner's work Hemispheres was aimed to introduce Gruner's work to New York's audience, and explores the dichotomy between the personal and collective. It is an installation of a series of her work and a video interview but the main piece takes place in the garden. This exhibition contains an arrangement of bright red thread, spread throughout two gardens. The piece is meant to exhibit Gruner's brain and the different thoughts and ideas being dispersed throughout the space. Her goal was to express the complexity of thoughts and feelings, in a world so complicated. It is representative of how everything in her life is connected yet it constructed by different fragments. The exhibition highlights her works such as The films Sand (1986) and Sentinel (2007), How to Look at Mexican Art (1995), Bauhaus for Monkeys (2011), and 500 kilos of Impotence (or possibility) (1998). Overall, the exhibition is meant to highlight over 30 years of her work and the dichotomies between a "psychological and subjective dimension, and a political and cultural one."

== Honors and awards ==
- Grants & Commissions Award from CIFO (2015)
- Fondo Nacional para la Cultura y las Artes- FONCA (Mexico, 2012–2015, 2008–2011, 2002–2005, 1999–2002)
- Apoyo del FONCA para Proyectos Especiales y Coinversiones Culturales, Mexico (1993-1994)
- Rockefeller MacArthur Film, Video and Multimedia Fellowship (1999-2000)
- FONCA scholarship (Mexico, 1990–1991)
- MFA with honors, Massachusetts College of Art, Boston, MA (1986)
