= Miwon Kwon =

Korean curator and art history educator (born 1961)

- Education: B.A. in Architecture and M.A. in Photography, UC Berkeley Ph.D. in Architectural History and Theory, Princeton University
- Occupations: Author, Curator, and Architectural Historian
- Writing career
- Subjects: Art history and architectural history
- Notable works: Documents (founding editor), One Place after Another: Site-Specific Art and Locational Identity

Miwon Kwon (born November 18, 1961) is a Korean curator and art history educator. Her work focuses on contemporary art, land art and site-specific art. She has curated several exhibitions at the Whitney Museum of American Art, and most recently she co-curated the exhibition Ends of the Earth: Land Art to 1974 at the Museum of Contemporary Art, Los Angeles with Philipp Kaiser. She began her position in the Art History Department at UCLA in 1998, and retired in 2023.

== Early life and education ==
Kwon was born in South Korea in 1961, and at age ten migrated to the United States, where her father was employed as a foreign correspondent for a Korean newspaper. She graduated from UC Berkeley with a B.A. in Architecture and a M.A. in Photography, and then went on to Princeton University to complete a Ph.D. in Architectural History and Theory in 1998. She attended the Independent Studio Program at the Whitney Museum of American Art in the 1988–89 academic year.

== Published works ==
She was a founding editor and publisher of the art criticism publication Documents and has contributed essays to a number of arts publications, exhibition catalogs and art monographs. She is the author of One Place After Another: Site Specific Art and Locational Identity, published by MIT Press in 2002. Her work has received critical review Stephen Morton, who praised the book for being "an exciting survey of the genealogies and practices that variously constitute site-specificity" but criticizing it for not addressing "its own site-specificity in the US metropolitan art world". Kwon also contributed an essay entitled "Sitings of Public Art: Integration versus Intervention" to the 2002 anthology Alternative Art New York, 1965-1985. She is currently working on her next book, a comprehensive study on the Cuban conceptual artist Felix Gonzalez-Torres. In 2012, Kwon organized the exhibition Ends of the Earth: Land Art to 1974 at MOCA with Philipp Kaiser, and edited an extensive catalogue of the same name, published by Prestel.
