= Myron Kunin =

American businessman and art collector

- Born: September 29, 1928; Minneapolis, Minnesota, U.S.
- Died: October 30, 2013 (aged 85); Minneapolis, Minnesota, U.S.
- Education: University of Minnesota
- Occupations: Businessman, art collector
- Known for: Founder of Regis Corporation
- Spouse: Anita Kunin
- Children: 4 sons

Myron Kunin (September 29, 1928 – October 30, 2013) was an American businessman and art collector. He was the founder of the Regis Corporation. His collection of African art was auctioned by Sotheby's in 2014 for over US$40 million. The vast majority of his collection was 20th century American art, much of which is on display at the Minneapolis Institute of Art.
