= Hugo Markl =

American artist and curator (born 1964)

- Born: December 6, 1964 (age 61); Pasadena, California, US
- Education: University of Applied Arts Vienna
- Known for: Artist
- Children: 2

Hugo Markl (born December 6, 1964) is an American artist and curator. His practice spans a broad range of media, including sculpture, photography, video, drawing, printmaking, installation art, and performance. Markl lives in New York City.

== Early life and education ==
Markl was born in Pasadena, California. He pursued his studies in Visual communication at the University of Applied Arts Vienna (1985—90), where he earned an M.A. in fine arts.

== Peers and constructive analytical approach ==
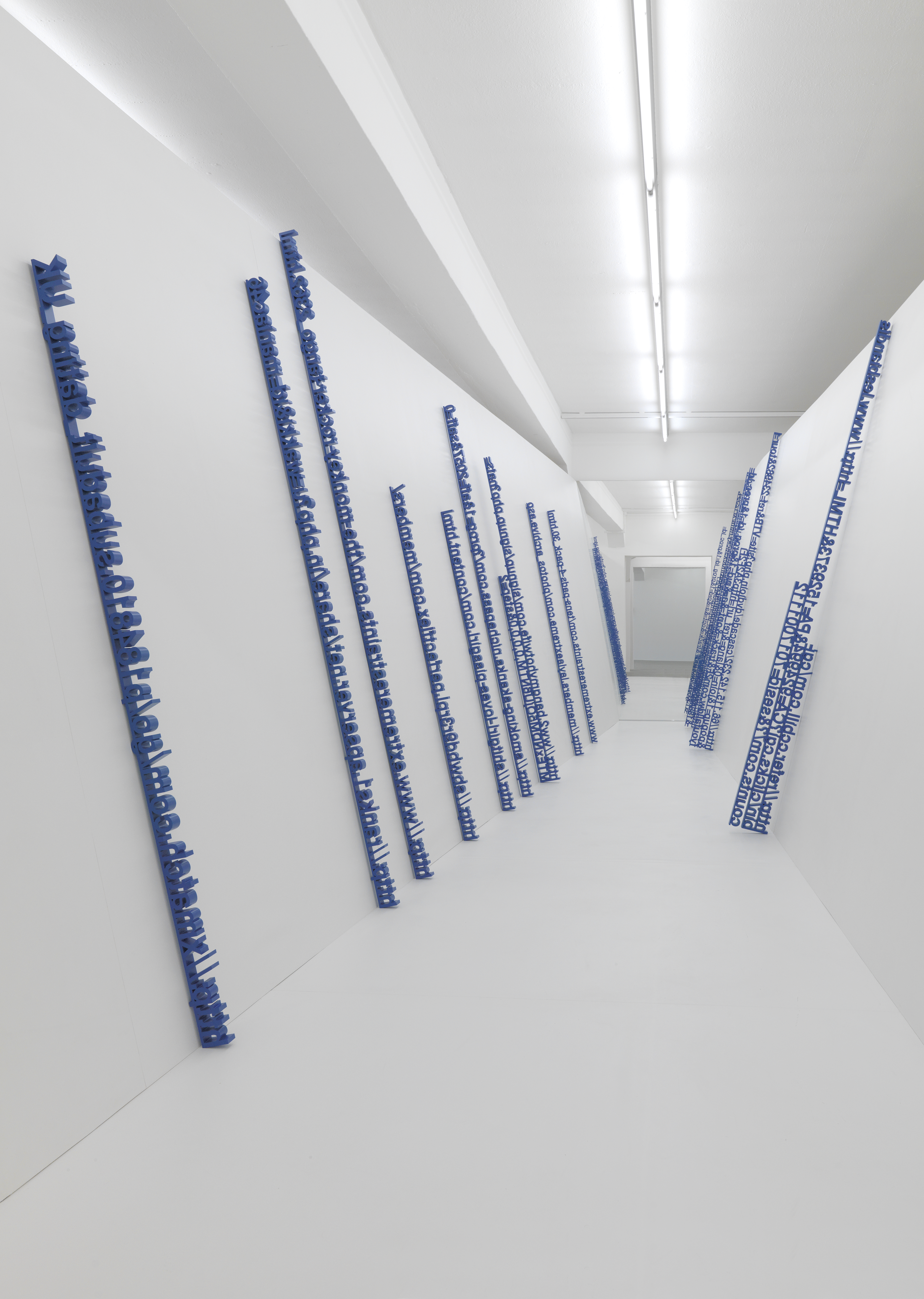
Link, 2008

A constructive analytical approach to examining the art of Hugo Markl and Cady Noland would involve identifying recurring themes, materials, and techniques used by both artists, and then analyzing how these elements contribute to their broader artistic and social commentary. Both artists engage with themes of violence, power, and the American psyche, but through distinct approaches. Markl's work often features constructed environments and staged scenarios, while Noland utilizes found objects and industrial materials to critique societal structures. Born into an age of increasingly conceptually oriented art and post-modern tendencies to privilege content over contents, that is, work that speaks via press release rather than its inherent formal considerations and their power to speak for themselves, Markl has consistently refused to engage in such tendencies. In both subject and process, works throughout Markl's oeuvre negate attempts to pseudo-intellectualize or to place them in some convenient niche of art making. And, in his wealth of output, emphasis is placed on the objects's voice rather than Markl's own. In 2008, the conceptual artist presented "Link", a series of medium-sized, blue-painted aluminum sculptures devoid of any explicit art historical references.

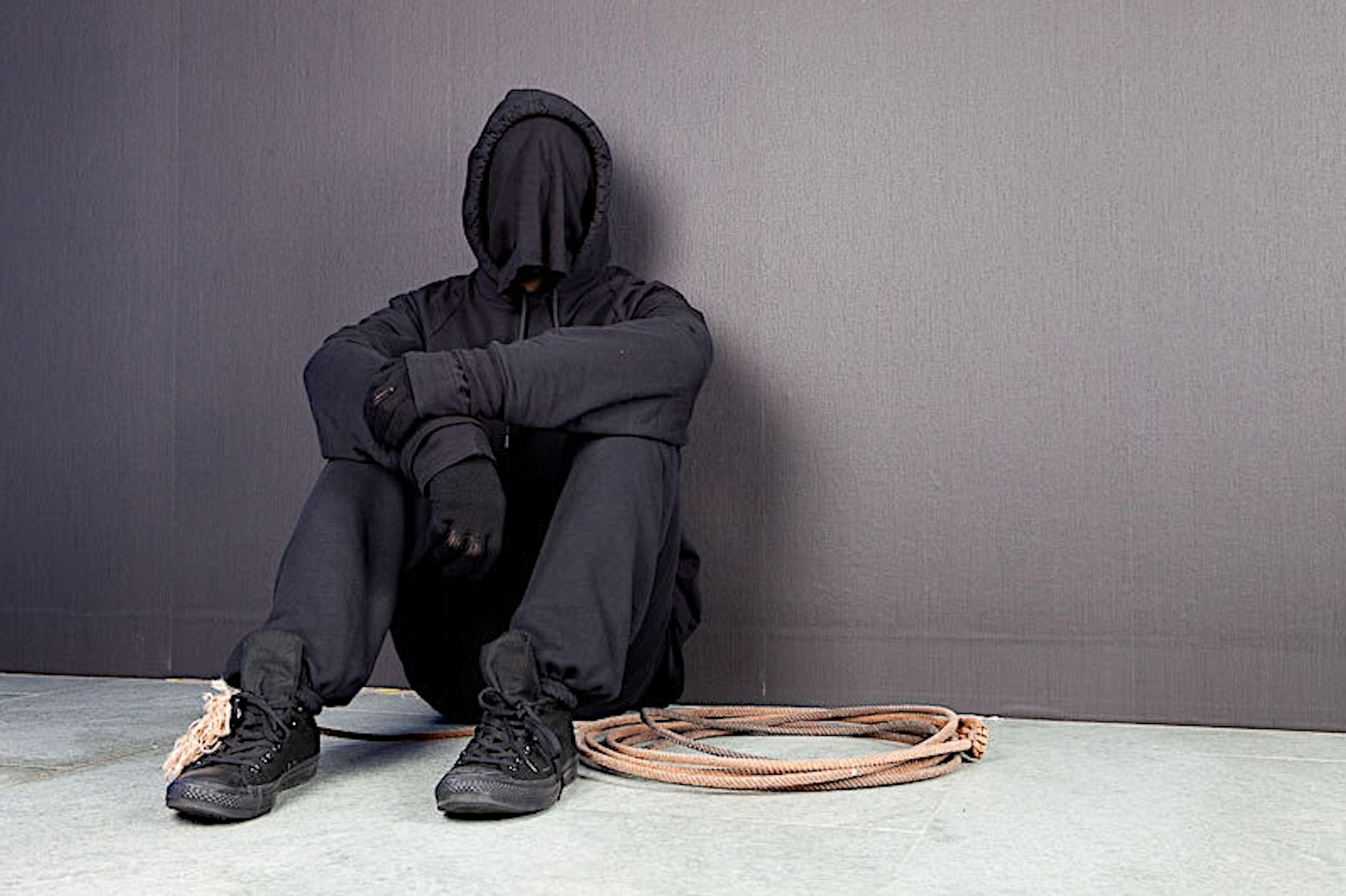
American Apparel, 2012, Berlin, Germany

Hugo Markl's Constructed Environments: Recurring themes: Markl's art frequently explores the human condition within constructed spaces, focusing on themes of containment, control, and the resulting unease. His installations challenge viewers to confront their own relationship with the built environment and its inherent limitations, often creating immersive experiences that force a reevaluation of societal structures. These elements appear both in iconographic tropes and others more newly minted. For example, in the exhibition SSSSS, the sculpture American Apparel (2012) depicts an individual seated on the floor, back against the wall, knees bent and supporting arms, clad entirely in black clothing, gloves and a balaclava-like face covering, all items from Los Angeles-based retail chain American Apparel. A lariat rope coils on the floor to the figures left, its end snaking under his or her legs. Though initially startling when one enters the room, the sculpture replaces that surprise with a simplistic juxtaposition of contemporary urban youth and the cowboys of the West.

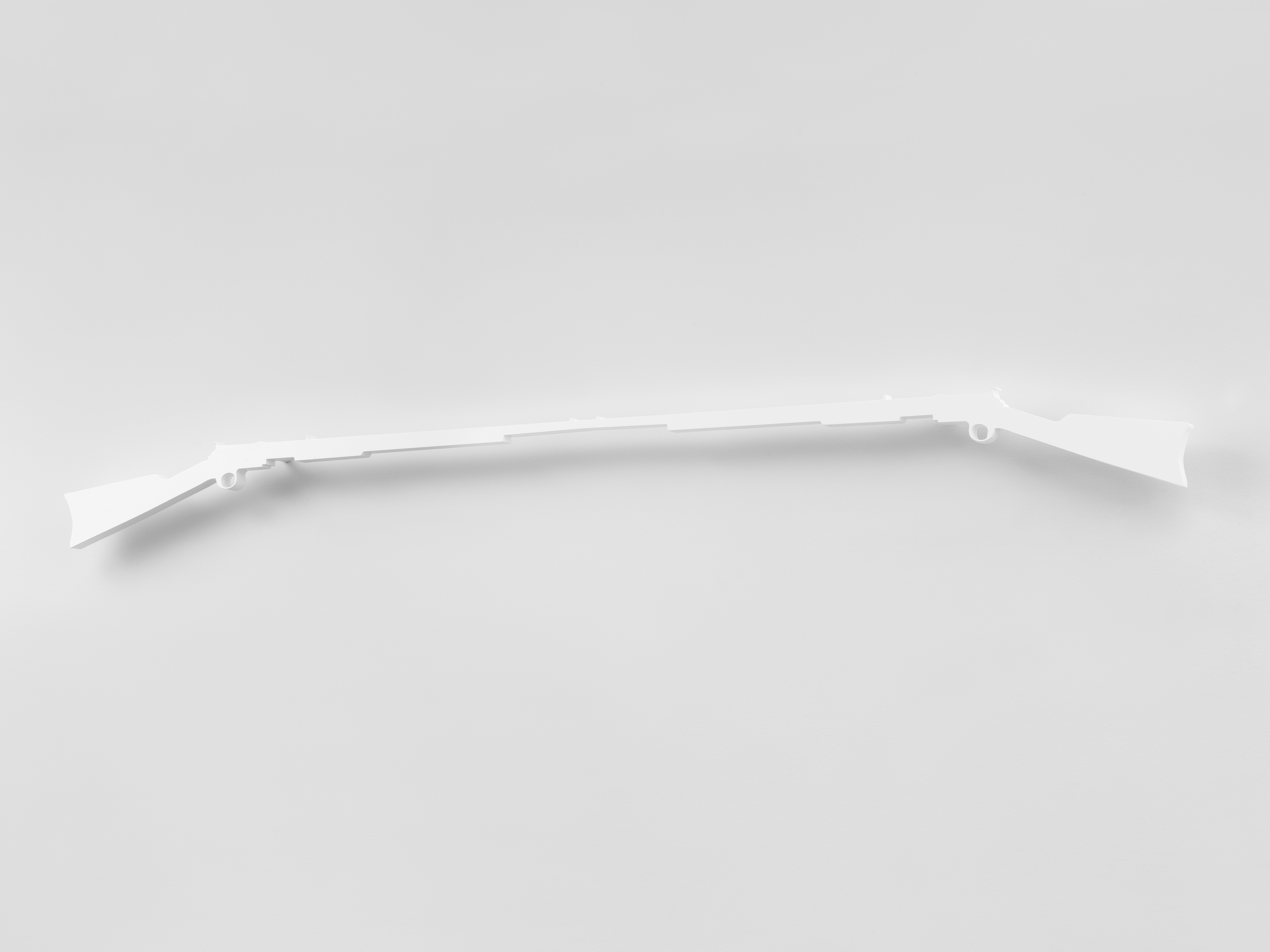
Winchester?, 2007

Materials and techniques: Markl utilizes a variety of materials, including wood, metal, and fabric, to create immersive and often disorienting environments. His work often involves meticulous construction and a focus on spatial relationships. Markl's choice of material for "Winchester?" (2007) —a continuation of his well-known series [of sculptures] formally constituted by the eponymous long barrel rifles, famous for their role in taming the West, in this case oriented such that the pair of muzzles join together into one long, lacquered aluminum tube.

Social commentary: Markl's constructed environments can be interpreted as critiques of societal structures and the ways in which they shape individual behavior, and experience. His work may highlight the ways in which systems of power operate and the potential for individuals to be both shaped by and alienated from these systems. Markl offers cues that somehow bring about affective, if not guttural reference to parts of the American visual DNA.

Cady Noland's Found Object Assemblages: Recurring themes: Noland's art is known for its sharp critique of American culture, specifically its obsession with celebrity, violence, and consumerism. Her work often confronts viewers with the darker aspects of the American Dream, challenging the notion of freedom and prosperity.

Materials and techniques: Noland frequently uses found objects like police barricades, aluminum siding, and tabloid images to create assemblages that evoke a sense of unease and disorder. Her work often incorporates elements of violence and chaos, challenging traditional notions of beauty and aesthetic value.

Social commentary: Noland's work is a powerful critique of American culture, particularly its obsession with violence, spectacle, and the commodification of everything. Her use of found objects and industrial materials can be seen as a way of exposing the underbelly of American society and challenging its idealized self-image.

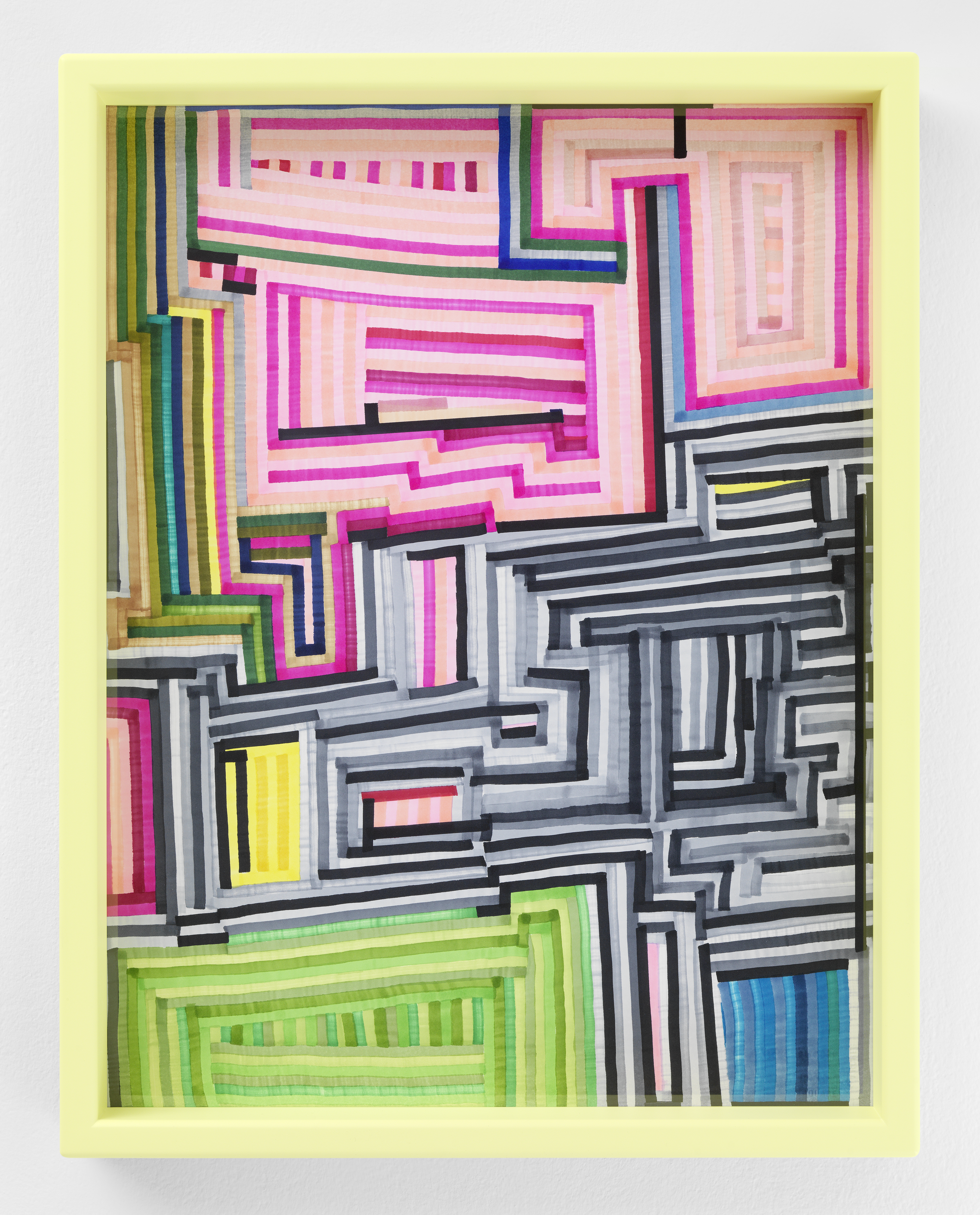
IQ, 2009

Comparative analysis: Both artists use their work to critique societal structures and the human condition, but they employ different strategies. Markl's constructed environments create immersive experiences that force viewers to confront their own relationship with space and control, while Noland's assemblages use found objects to critique American culture and its contradictions. While both artists engage with themes of violence, Markl's work often focuses on the psychological and spatial aspects of violence, while Noland's work often confronts the physical and material manifestations of violence in American society. By analyzing the specific materials, techniques, and recurring themes in their work, one can gain a deeper understanding of how Markl and Noland each engage with the complex relationship between individuals, society, social psychology, and the built environment. Making a statement about an object or about the formulation concerning an object inherently means also querying the concept of the statement, since the concept and that which it refers to are interdependent and therefore concepts and statements are shaped by that which they refer to.

== Work ==
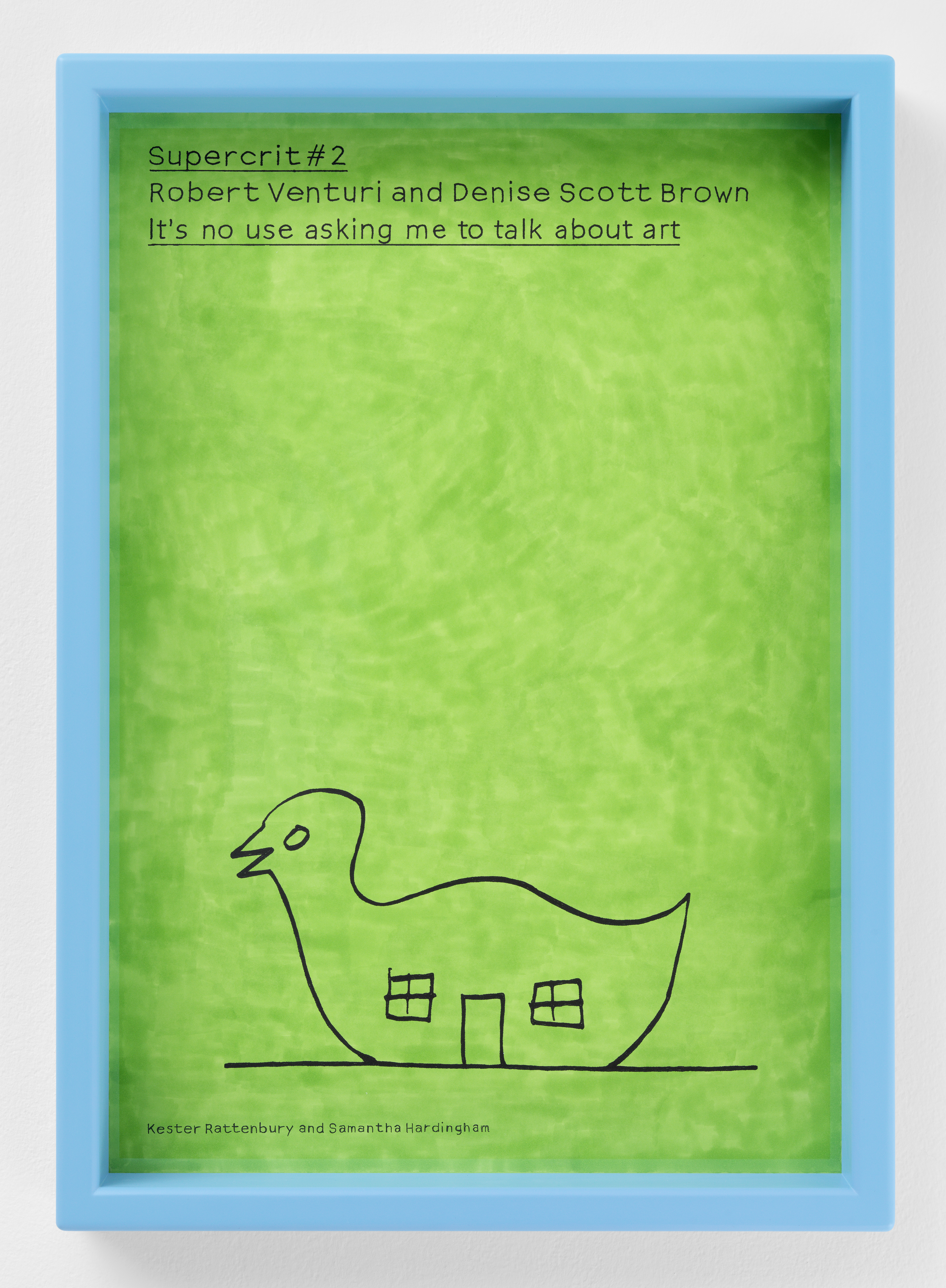
IQ, it's no use asking me to talk about art, 2009

Markl's work examines consumerism and the imagery of consumer society and popular culture, incorporating elements such as mass media images, signage, fashion aesthetics, and various objects with cultural significance, such as the Winchester rifle. Through collages, drawings, sculptures, and installations, Markl explores the relationship between images and their meanings, often juxtaposing references from both low and high culture. For example, his IQ drawing series (2009) combines text and imagery, such as overlaying the word "ROCK" on a nude figure or the IKEA logo with a reproduction of Horkheimer and Adorno's Dialectic of Enlightenment.

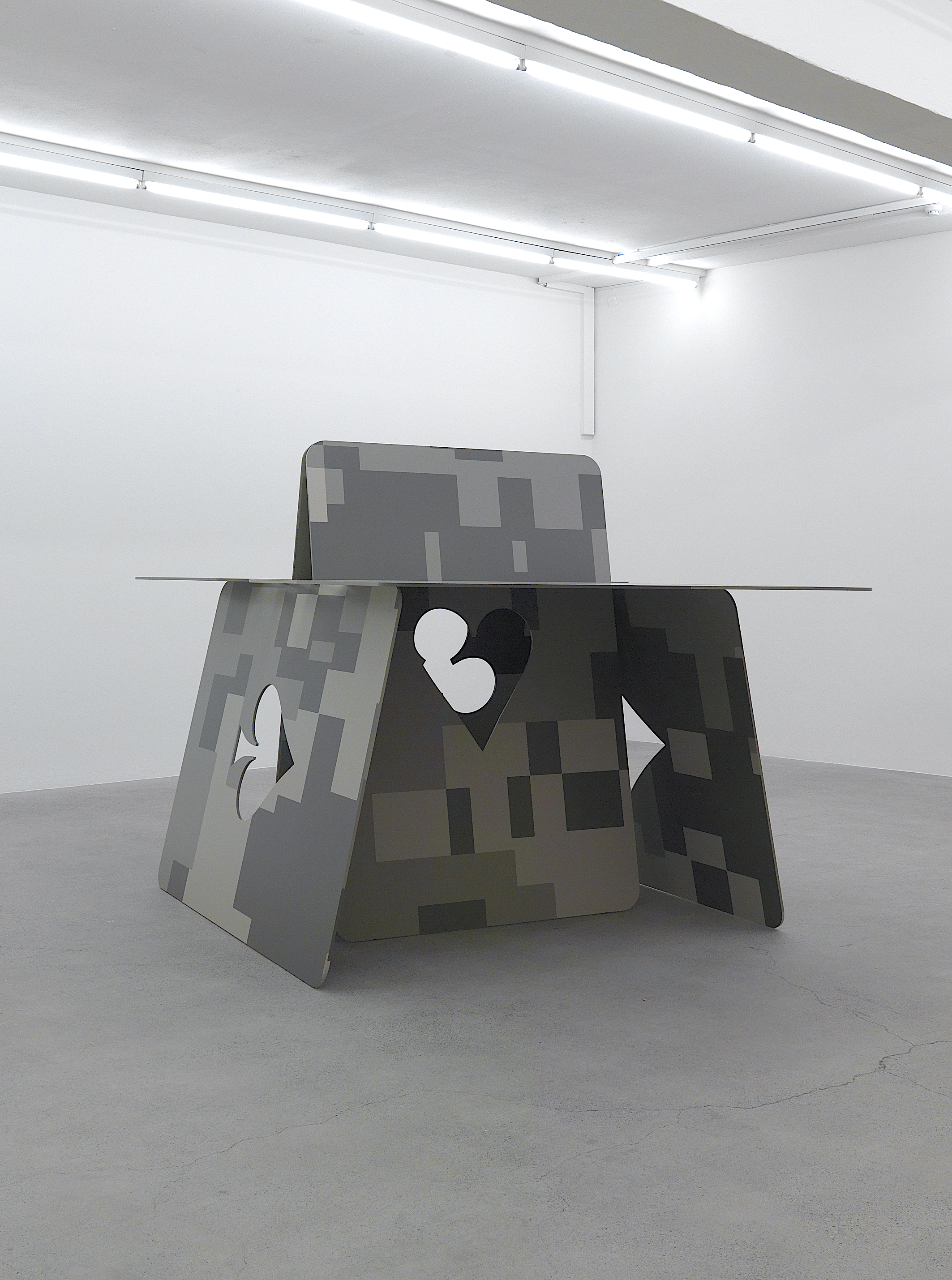
HEARTBURN, 2008

Markl's work has been reviewed in publications including Art in America and the Neue Zürcher Zeitung. His work was noted for engaging with themes of aesthetic experience and the cultural significance of contemporary artistic creation. In 1997, Iwan Wirth described Hugo Markl's installation "Peter Builts" as "the opposite of Bruce Nauman's installations, but just as powerful." Despite these differences, Markl paid tribute to Bruce Nauman in 2012 at the solo exhibition "SSSSS" at Dittrich & Schlechtriem in Berlin, Germany, by impersonating Bruce Nauman.

Markl's art can easily forego the pathos of invention and stick to that which exists anyway in order to demonstrate that it never ends with itself or rests in itself, but can appear in ever new semantic constellations and/as actual contexts. This unstoppable mechanism and semantic movement is visualized by Hugo Markl, aka Peter Builts, by means of poetically channeled linkings which consistently defy any fixed determination and definitive interpretation. Keeping the play of interpretations open and moving, also means defining art as a technique of interpretation that needs to be interpreted in turn, venturing out into an open and unsecured field in order to comprehend precisely this dilemma as a potential. Viewed in this way Hugo Markl transfers the inescapable dynamics, contingency and temporariness of the concept of art into the production of his work, or in other words, through his way of defying to comply with the inherent conventions of the art market he shows that the production of art and of its concept constantly give rise to each other precisely because of their differences from each other.

== Collaboration, curatorial work, public art, and representation ==
Urs Fischer is the sole artist with whom Hugo Markl engaged in a collaborative endeavor in the strictest sense of the term. The first version of the Untitled (Bread House) was realized in 2004 through a collaboration with peer and curator Hugo Markl, who facilitated its public installation in Vienna, Austria. While Markl's curatorial work in the 2000s within the public art realm constitutes a distinct topic, Fischer and Markl collaborated on the video production for Markl's exhibition at Hauser & Wirth 2 in 1999. Images of video stills are on pages 38 and 39 of the 2001 published catalogue, The Birth of Peter Builts and the Death of Hugo Markl Because I no longer am I am everybody I am everything. This adaptation of a performance by British artists Gilbert and George exemplified the artistic approach of Fischer and Markl: to position the concept of appropriation as the central focus of their work.

Throughout the 1990s, 2000s, and 2010s, Fischer and Markl were represented by the same galleries.

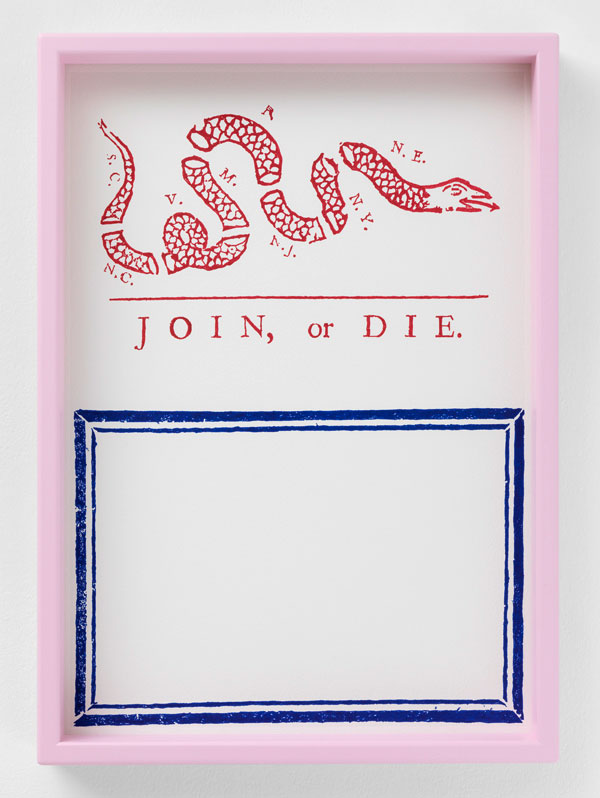
IQ, 2010

== Selected exhibitions ==
=== Solo exhibitions ===
- 2012 - Un'espressione geografica, Fondazione Sandretto Re Rebaudengo, Turin, Italy
- 2012 - DITTRICH & SCHLECHTRIEM, SSSSS, Berlin
- 2010 - Galerie Eva Presenhuber, "One day 1917, while his director was out sick with a hangover, John Ford made his first feature. ...", Zürich
- 2009 - AMP Gallery, DR FRANKENSTEIN, Athens
- 2008 - Galerie Eva Presenhuber, Link, Zürich
- 2007 - The Third Mind, Palais de Tokyo, Paris, France
- 2007 - Galleria Raucci/Santamaria, MAMATSCHI, Naples
- 2006 - André Schlechtriem Temporary, CALCIUM, New York
- 2006 - Galleria Raucci / Santamaria, SHRUG, Naples
- 2006 - Galerie Eva Presenhuber, BROWN, Zurich
- 2003 - Gruppe Österreichische Guggenheim, PETER BUILTS OFFENE RECHNUNG, Vienna
- 1999 - Hauser & Wirth & Presenhuber, The Birth of Peter Builts and the Death of Hugo Markl Because I No Longer Am I Am Everybody I Am Everything, Zurich
- 1998 - Galerie am Andechshof, Hugo Markl & Paloma / Installativ und Konzert, Innsbruck
- 1997 - Liste 97 the young art fair, Basel
- 1997 - Galerie Walcheturm, peter builts, Zurich
- 1996 - Austrian Institute, NOSTALHU, with major support from the Austrian Cultural Forum London
- 1995 - ACME studios for the artists, superapologize 60 min., with major support from the Austrian Cultural Forum London
- 1994 - Galerie Walcheturm, Hugo Markl, Gudrun Ensslin, Zurich
- 1992 - Galerie Walcheturm, Hugo Markl, Zurich
- 1991 - Shedhalle, Manum de tabula, Zurich, Switzerland
- 1989 - Pinx Galerie, SHIRT, Vienna
- 1987 - Universität für Angewandte Kunst, Kieltrunk, Vienna

=== Group exhibitions ===
- 2019 - We The People, Lovaas, Munich, Germany
- 2016 - They printed it!, Kunsthalle Zürich, Zurich
- 2014 - La Gioia, Maison Particulière - Art Center, Brussels
- 2012 - Un'espressione geografica, Fondazione Sandretto Re Rebaudengo, Turin, Italy
- 2010 | 2011 - PLUS ULTRA, Works from the Sandretto Re Rebaudengo Collection. Museo D'Arte Contemporanea, Rome, Italy
- 2010 - Haus für Kunst Uri, Edition 5, Erstfeld, Switzerland
- 2009 - Hamburger Bahnhof + Flick Collection, DIE KUNST IST SUPER!, Berlin
- 2009 - Galerie Patrick Seguin invites Galerie Eva Presenhuber, We Are Sun-kissed and Snow-blind, Paris
- 2009 - Burger Collection, CONFLICTING TALES, Berlin
- 2008 - Gladstone Gallery, No Information Available, curated by Francesco Bonami, Brussels
- 2007 - Yvon Lambert Gallery, Mario Testino‚ At Home, New York
  - House Eva Presenhuber, Jubilee Exhibition, Vnà, Switzerland
  - Palais de Tokyo, The Third Mind, curated by Ugo Rondinone, Paris
- 2005 - Nicole Klagsbrun Gallery, INTERSTATE, New York
- 2003 - Tiroler Landesmuseum Ferdinandeum, Innsbruck
  - Gruppe Öesterreichische Guggenheim, Kunstverein, GLÜHWEIN + KESCHTN – Lavuapappn, Vienna
- 1998 - Museum Moderner Kunst, Stiftung Ludwig, 20 Haus, Die Sammlung, Vienna
- 1996 - Artothek im Parlamentsgebäude, Ausstellung 96, Vienna
  - Kunsthaus Zürich, Wunderkammer Öesterreich, Zurich
  - MAK – Museum für Angewandte Kunst, Austria im Rosennetz, Vienna
  - Museum Moderner Kunst, Stiftung Ludwig, Coming up, Vienna
  - Kunstankäufe des Landes Tirol 1994 –1996, Galerie im Taxispalais, Innsbruck
- 1995 - Fondazione Querini, Lokalzeit – Wiener Material im Spiegel des Unbehagens, (curator Peter Weibel), Venice
  - Karin Kilimnik, Galerie Walcheturm, window display by Hugo Markl, no face entertainment raw, Zurich
  - ACME studios for the artists, superapologize 60 min., (major support by the Austrian institute, London), London
- 1994 - Museum und Galerie Moderner Kunst Laibach, Lokalzeit – Wiener Material im Spiegel des Unbehagens, Laibach / SLO
  - Kunstraum Strohal, Lokalzeit – Wiener Material im Spiegel des Unbehagens, Vienna
  - Galerie im Taxispalais, Art Tirol, Innsbruck
- 1994 - Eine Galerie stellt sich vor: Galerie Wacheturm, Zürich, Galerie im Taxispalais, Tirol, Innsbruck
- 1993 - Centre d' Art Contemporain Martigny, Martigny
- 1991 - Shedhalle, Manum de tabula, Zurich
- 1991 - Shedhalle, STILLSTAND switches, Zurich, Switzerland
- 1989 - Secession, Junge Szene Wien, Vienna
- 1989 - Museum des 20. Jahrhunderts, (curator Oswald Oberhuber), Vienna

== Collections ==
=== Private collections ===
- Fondazione Sandretto Re Rebaudengo, Turin, Italy
- Burger Collection, Hong Kong, China
- Friedrich Christian Flick Collection, Hamburger Bahnhof, Berlin, Germany
- MUMOK Museum Moderner Kunst Stiftung Ludwig, Vienna, Austria
- Pomeranz Collection, Vienna, Austria
- Andreas Züst († 2000) Collection, Switzerland
- Joel Wachs, President of the Andy Warhol Foundation, New York, N.Y.
- Claude Berri († 2009), Paris, France
- Sofia Coppola, New York, N.Y.
- Urs Fischer, New York, N.Y.
- Ugo Rondinone, New York, N.Y.
- Mario Testino, Art Projects at Home, Paris, France, and New York, N.Y.
- David Teiger († 2014), New York, N.Y.
- Hauser & Wirth, Zurich, Switzerland
- Eva Presenhuber, Zurich, Switzerland
- SPA | Spazio Per Arte ETS (Collezione Laura e Luigi Giordano), Oleggio, Italy

=== Public collections ===
- Mead Art Museum at Amherst College
- Hampshire College Art Gallery
- Historic Deerfield
- Mount Holyoke College Art Museum
- The Joseph Allen Skinner Museum at Mount Holyoke College
- Smith College Museum of Art
- University Museum of Contemporary Art at UMASS Amherst
