= Gorgoni =

Gorgoni is a surname. Notable people with the surname include:

- Adam Gorgoni (born 1963), American composer
- Al Gorgoni (born 1939), American guitarist, composer, arranger, and producer
- Gaetano Gorgoni (1933–2020), Italian politician
- Gianfranco Gorgoni (1941–2019), Italian photographer
