= Steven Shearer =

Canadian contemporary artist

- Born: 1968 (age 57–58); New Westminster, British Columbia
- Education: Emily Carr University of Art and Design
- Known for: multimedia artist

Steven Shearer (born 1968) is a contemporary artist based in Vancouver, British Columbia, part of the photoconceptualism scene of the Vancouver School.

== Work ==
Shearer attended Emily Carr University in Vancouver, and then painted work which combined text and geometry. After 1996, he returned to figurative art in his paintings and other work, focusing on youth, alienation, aggression, melancholy, and heavy metal. Critics speak of his sources in his painting and drawings being artists such as Henri de Toulouse-Lautrec or Edvard Munch. His drawings in particular examine what has been called a sub-culture and some themes of victimization. In Artforum in 2005, Matthew Higgs affectionately called Shearer the "bastard offspring of the Photo-conceptualists." As one critic wrote:

Shearer's subject matter centres on youth, alienation and barely repressed violence. It is a world inhabited by death-metal rockers, 1970s prefab boy bands and teen stars, glam-rockers and guitar-wielding teenaged suburban dreamers who−we know from their bad hair and bad skin and shabby domestic surroundings−will never make it, no matter how often they practise "Stairway to Heaven."

Steven Shearer's breakthrough year was 2007, when Birmingham's Ikon Gallery gave him his first major European-institution exhibition, curated by Nigel Prince and Helena Reckitt, produced in collaboration with Toronto's The Power Plant, which showed the exhibition as well. This major survey included recent works and key pieces from the past decade. In the catalogue, Helena Reckitt wrote:

Drawn to scrappily resistant forms of expression, Shearer celebrates the anger, aggression and creativity that bubble beneath the surface of polite society. Like other Vancouver artists before him, he revels in the detritus of everyday life, associating discarded objects and degraded media with social outsiders. His mural, billboard, and poster poems inspired by scatological and blasphemous Heavy Metal lyrics and song titles present visions of the nihilistic sublime that would be disturbing if they weren't so entertainingly hyperbolic.

In 2021, a series of Shearer's photographic works referring to historical paintings was removed from a popular walking and cycling route along Vancouver's West Side due to complaints from the public. The reclining and sleeping figures were part of a 2021 Capture Photography Festival public art exhibition. Capture convened an international group of arts professionals to discuss the controversy with attendance by Zoom.

== Selected public exhibitions ==
Shearer's work has been exhibited internationally, including at the Tate Modern in London (2005), the Renaissance Society in Chicago (2005), The New Museum in New York (2008), Galerie Eva Presenhuber in Zurich (2005–2021), and the Barbara Gladstone Gallery in New York (2020). In 2011, he represented Canada at the 54th International Venice Biennale in a show titled Exhume to Consume. Nationally, his work has been shown at the Art Gallery of Ontario in Toronto (1996) and the Contemporary Art Gallery in Vancouver (2004–2005) as well as included in Shore, Forest and Beyond: Art from the Audain Collection at the Vancouver Art Gallery (2011) 1+1=1'; When Collections Collide at the Montreal Museum of Fine Arts (2014); and in the Canadian Biennial at the National Gallery of Canada, Ottawa (2017). In 2022, his work was exhibited in a solo show at The Polygon Gallery, North Vancouver. He has been represented by Galerie Eva Presenhuber in Zurich since 2005. In addition, his work has been on You Tube.

== Awards ==
In 2005, he was presented with a Viva Award and in 2006, he was shortlisted for the Sobey Art Award.
