= Tuggar =

Tuggar is a surname. Notable people with the surname include:

- Fatimah Tuggar (born 1967), Nigerian artist
- Yusuf Tuggar (born 1967), Nigerian diplomat
