= Art Production Fund =

Public art nonprofit in New York

- Abbreviation: APF
- Founded: 2000; 26 years ago
- Founder: Yvonne Force Villareal; Doreen Remen
- Legal status: 501(c)(3) organization
- Purpose: Commissioning and producing public art projects
- Location: New York, New York
- Key people: Casey Fremont
- Website: www.artproductionfund.org

Art Production Fund (APF) is a non-profit organization under section 501(c)(3) of the U.S. tax code that presents public art throughout the United States. It was founded in 2000 by Yvonne Force Villareal and Doreen Remen. As of 2020, it is directed by Casey Fremont.

== Public projects ==
This is a select list of public art projects by APF.

- Fatimah Tuggar, "Changing Space," New York, New York, 2002
- Elmgreen & Dragset, “Prada Marfa,” Valentine, Texas, 2005–ongoing
- Rudolf Stingel, "Plan B," Grand Central Station, New York City, 2004
- Tim Noble and Sue Webster, "Electric Fountain," Rockefeller Center, New York City, 2008
- David Brooks, Josephine Meckseper, Kiki Smith, "The Last Lot," New York City, 2011–2012
- FriendsWithYou, "Light Cave," New York City, 2014
- Ugo Rondinone, “Seven Magic Mountains,” Las Vegas, 2016–ongoing
- Jeff Koons, “Seated Ballerina,” Rockefeller Center, New York City, 2017
- Zoe Buckman, “CHAMP,” LA, 2018–ongoing
- Raul de Nieves, “When I Look In To Your Eyes I See the Sun,” Miami, 2018–2019
- Lucy Sparrow, “Lucy’s Delicatessen on 6th,” Rockefeller Center, New York City, 2019
- Nancy Baker Cahill, “Liberty Bell”, Selma, Alabama; Charleston, South Carolina; Washington D.C.; Philadelphia, Pennsylvania; Rockaway, New York; Boston, Massachusetts, 2020
