= Meckseper =

Meckseper is a surname. Notable people with the surname include:

- Josephine Meckseper (born 1964), German-born American artist
- Philip Meckseper, also known as Jr Blender, German record producer and songwriter
