= Gianfranco Gorgoni =

Italian photographer (1941–2019)

Gianfranco Gorgoni, c.1970s

Gianfranco Gorgoni (24 December 1941 – 11 September 2019) was an Italian photographer who documented land art and installation art. His work was exhibited in a survey show, Gianfranco Gorgoni: Land Art Photographs, at the Nevada Museum of Art in 2021.

== Early life ==
Gorgoni was born in Rome to Italian actress Olga Gorgoni. He became an orphan at the age of 12. Then he grew up in Bomba, in the Abruzzo region of Italy.

== Work ==
Gorgoni photographed Andy Warhol, Bruce Nauman, Robert Rauschenberg, Jasper Johns, Roy Lichtenstein, James Rosenquist, John Chamberlain, Joseph Beuys and Truman Capote. For one book, he collaborated with Fidel Castro. He was best known for documenting the creation of outdoor installations of land art, such as his pictures of Robert Smithson's Spiral Jetty, made in the Great Salt Lake in Utah in 1970. Gorgoni also photographed works by Michael Heizer and by the artists Christo and Jeanne-Claude, in the 1970s. He was hired by the Nevada Museum of Art as official photographer of Ugo Rondinone's Seven Magic Mountains.

Gorgoni's photographs of land art, installation art and other emergent forms were published in the 1972 book, The New Avant-Garde: Issues for the Art of the Seventies.

== Publications ==
- The New Avant-Garde: Issues for the Art of the Seventies (1972)
- Beyond the Canvas: Artists of the Seventies and Eighties (1985)
- Gianfranco Gorgoni: Land Art Photographs. Monacelli; Nevada Museum of Art, 2021. ISBN 978-1580935593. Includes the work of Nancy Holt, Christo and Jean-Claude, and others. With essays by Ann M. Wolfe, Germano Celant, and William L. Fox. Published in conjunction with an exhibition at Nevada Museum of Art.

== Exhibitions ==
- Gianfranco Gorgoni: Land Art Photographs, Nevada Museum of Art, 2021. A survey.

== Death ==
He died of cancer on 11 September 2019 at his home in Harlem. He was buried in the family vault at Bomba.

== Collections ==
Gorgoni's work is held in the following permanent collections:

- Nevada Museum of Art
- Getty Museum
- Whitney Museum of American Art
- Smithsonian American Art Museum
