= John Dilg =

American painter (born 1945)

- Born: 1945 (age 80–81); Evanston, Illinois, United States
- Education: Rhode Island School of Design, Lalit Kala Akademi
- Known for: Painting
- Spouse: Jan Weissmiller
- Awards: National Endowment for the Arts, Fulbright Grant

John Dilg (born 1945) is an American painter based in the Midwest. He is known for idiosyncratic landscapes that use a pared-down visual vocabulary drawing on imagination, vernacular artifacts, folk art and art historical sources. Critics describe them as dreamlike ruminations on place, the fragility of nature, the collective unconscious and mystical storytelling. Precedents for his work that have been cited include 19th-century Romantic landscape painters, Marsden Hartley, Georgia O’Keeffe and Horace Pippin, and the imaginary vistas of Henri Rousseau.

John Dilg, I Felt So Symbolic Yesterday (C.C.), oil on canvas, 16" x 20", 2016.

In 2016, John Yau wrote that Dilg's landscapes, "arise out of the collision of observation and memory, things seen and the history of painting remembered," evoking an "otherworldly hush and reverence." Curator Terri C. Smith wrote, "Dilg makes objects that are at once naïve and sophisticated, familiar and enigmatic. The tension in the paintings between known and unknown, fine art and found art along with their small scale encourages a very intimate, personal viewing experience."

Dilg was a professor in the School of Art and Art History at the University of Iowa for over four decades, before retiring as Professor Emeritus in 2017. He lives in Iowa City, and is married to Jan Weissmiller, poet and owner of Prairie Lights Books. His work belongs to the public art collections of the Museum of Contemporary Art Chicago, Museu d'Art Contemporani Vicente Aguilera Cerni (Spain) and Saint Louis Art Museum, among others.

== Life and career ==
Dilg was born in Evanston, Illinois in 1945 and spent his childhood in the Chicago-area with summers in rural Iowa. He earned a BFA degree in painting and filmmaking at Rhode Island School of Design in 1969 and studied at the Lalit Kala Akademi in India (1971–2) through a Fulbright Scholarship. In 1973, during a Yaddo artist residency, he met artist and future mentor Byron Burford, who recruited him to teach at the University of Iowa.

John Dilg, Hide, oil on canvas, 11" x 14", 2001.

Dilg's earliest work consisted of large, gestural, Abstract Expressionist canvasses. By the 1980s, his paintings featured more regular, dark lines separating abstract planes of color that engaged the picture edges; writers compared them to the work of Richard Diebenkorn and—despite their abstraction—to the quirkier Chicago Imagists. During this period, he exhibited solo at Roy Boyd Gallery in Chicago (1978–83) and in group shows at the Smithsonian Institution, Butler Institute of American Art, Joslyn Art Museum, Indianapolis Museum of Art, and N.A.M.E. Gallery, among others.

In the late 1980s, Dilg began a decade-long shift toward more restrained flat surfaces and simpler, centralized compositions. A solo exhibition at the Evanston Art Center in 1996 marked his transition from purely formal concerns towards narrative and vaguely referential forms. This work brought him greater attention, including representation by Luise Ross Gallery in New York and shows there (e.g., at Andrea Rosen Gallery, Sikkema Jenkins & Co. and Jeff Bailey Gallery) and elsewhere.

In the 2000s, Dilg shifted to small, exactingly composed paintings of iconic, glyph-like forms that ranged from fully abstract shapes to barely recognizable animals and landscape elements, as in Hide (2001); New York Times critic Ken Johnson described them as exuding "a modest archetypal mystery." This work increasingly referenced vernacular sources, reflecting Dilg's interests in the function of the souvenir as a carrier of recollected times, events and stories.

Since 2000, Dilg has had solo exhibitions at the Figge Art Museum and Rhodes College (Memphis), and galleries including Galerie Eva Presenhuber (New York/Vienna, 2021–3), Regina Rex and Luise Ross (2000–11) in New York, Taymour Grahne (London/New York), Steven Zevitas (Boston), Steve Turner Gallery (Los Angeles), Devening Projects (Chicago), National Exemplar (Iowa City), and Schmidt Contemporary Art (St. Louis). Writers John Yau and Steven Zevitas contend that the late-career national recognition Dilg has received was overdue, the delay a likely result of his (in Yau's words) residing in a "fly-over state."

== Mature work and reception ==
By 2006, Dilg committed to a spare landscape mode that New York Times critic Roberta Smith later termed "cartoon-visionary." In these small-scale paintings, he engages his subject less as historically specific sites than as stylized, general signs that metaphorically record and convey his relationship with the land. They bring together diverse sources and precedents in a singular, personal vision—among them, 19th-century chromolithography, Japanese woodcuts, Early Renaissance landscapes, self-taught art, vintage postcards and game boards, thrift-store paint-by-number paintings and handmade signs. Dilg's interest in tourist and folk-art sources stems from a desire to recover the immediacy, sense of wonder and discovery, and uncanniness of such imagery—qualities often trained out of professional artists. His carefully selected and composed pictorial elements often tap into the power of primal subjects: waterfalls and gorges (e.g., On Another Planet, 2012), towering sequoia forests and evergreens, and formations like Yosemite's Half Dome that evoke the American West of 19th-century artists like Albert Bierstadt and Thomas Moran, as well as the Gothic, moonlit landscapes of German Romantics, such as Caspar David Friedrich.

John Dilg, On Another Planet, oil on canvas, 16" x 20", 2012.

Dilg applies his paints with a flat, dry, scumbled approach, seamlessly layering thin color gradations over charcoal-line drawings that often reveal hints of underpainting to create a halo-effect around his forms. He allows the rough weave of the canvas to show through, which gives the paintings a nubby, fresco-like materiality as well as an almost pixelated appearance. Dilg works with a subtly shifting, restricted palette of celadon greens, pale blues, and sandy or greyed browns that has been described as evoking Midwest prairies, the veiled light created by misty Pacific Northwest rains, and deep geologic time. New York Times critic Jason Farago wrote that this restrained tonal range called to mind the color approaches of Giorgio Morandi, Agnes Martin and Luc Tuymans, as well as classical Korean ceramics.

Critics have characterized Dilg's mature work as enigmatic, "quasi-mystical" and deliberative. The Boston Globe's Cate McQuaid wrote that its "almost pictographic simplicity" and "incantatory energy" pulls viewers "into an intimate, low-key exchange, quiet and deeply felt" while suggesting monumental forms and vast pictorial space. Reviewers have also noted an element of humor that often emerges through single, odd details, as in Natural Wonder (2007) and Headdress (2011), in which a dominant rock formation transforms, respectively, into an enormous torso and a head. In reviews of Dilg's 2021 show, "Flight Path" (Galerie Eva Presenhuber), writers suggested that nostalgia gave way to ambivalent and elegiac references to humanity's impact on the landscape. For example, in Approaching Future (2017), a shrinking glacier expels tiny ice floats topped with Christmas-tree pines into the sea; Improvements (2020) depicts a leveled forest-scape speckled with tree stumps resembling rock formations.

== Recognition ==
Dilg's work belongs to the public collections of the Arkansas Arts Center, Figge Art Museum, Illinois State University, Museu d'Art Contemporani Vicente Aguilera Cerni (Spain), Museum of Contemporary Art Chicago, Saint Louis Art Museum, and Stanley Museum of Art. He has been awarded fellowships from the National Endowment for the Arts, Ragdale Foundation and Yaddo Foundation, and received a Fulbright Grant.

== Additional professional activities ==
In addition to his teaching career at the University of Iowa, Dilg has been a visiting artist at more than forty institutions, including the University of Chicago, University of Pennsylvania, Sarah Lawrence College, Stanford University, and Yale University. He has also collaborated with the poets Marvin Bell, Lyn Hejinian, and Tomaz Salamun on letterpress broadsides, and with poet Timothy Donnelly, on the book Die neue Sicht der Dinge (2008).

== Exhibitions ==
=== Selected Solo Exhibitions ===
- 2024: Planet on the Prairie, Galerie Eva Presenhuber, Zurich, Switzerland
- 2023: Leaving the New World, Galerie Eva Presenhuber, Vienna, AT
- 2021: Flight Path, Eva Presenhuber, New York, NY, US
- 2020: Recurring Dreams, online, Taymour Grahne Gallery, London, UK
- 2019: Arterial Resources, 10-year survey, Figge Museum of Art, Davenport, IA, US
- 2019: Features, Steve Turner Gallery, Los Angeles, CA, US
- 2018: Deep Water Prairie, Devening Projects, Chicago, IL, US
- 2016: Natural Memory, Taymour Grahne, New York, NY, US
- 2013: This Land is Your Land, Steven Zevitas Gallery, Boston, MA, US
- 2012: In Another World, Clough-Hanson Gallery, Rhodes College, Memphis, TN, US
- 2011: Primitive Pets, Luise Ross Gallery, New York, NY, US
- 2008: Recent Work, Schmidt Contemporary Art, St. Louis, MO, US
- 2007: Natural Re-Visions, Luise Ross Gallery, New York, NY, US
- 2004: Recent Work, Schmidt Contemporary Art, St. Louis, MO, US
- 2002: Recent Work, Luise Ross Gallery, New York, NY, US
- 2000: Recent Work, Luise Ross Gallery, New York, NY, US
