= Lucy Sparrow =

British artist

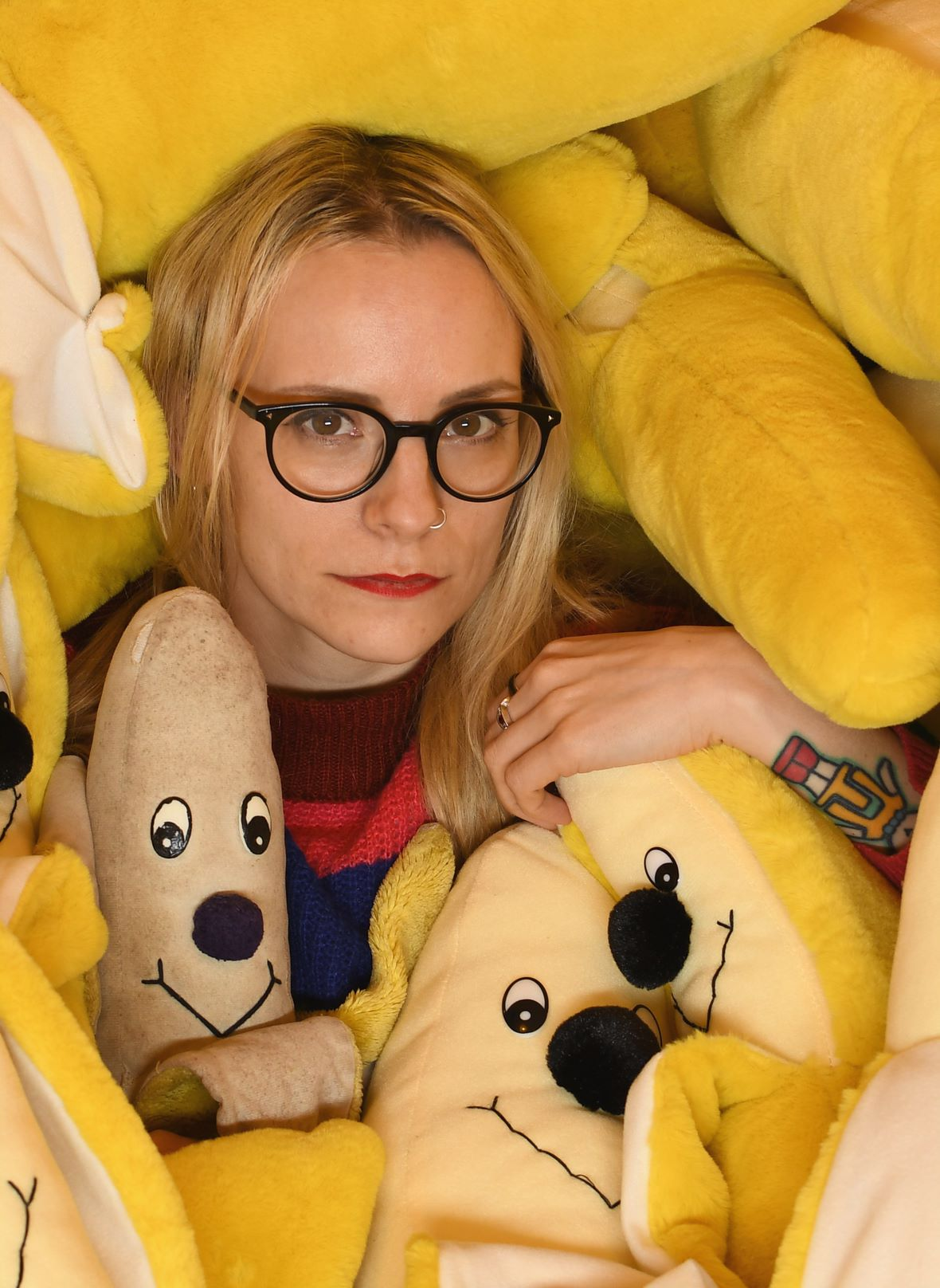
- Lucy Sparrow and Basil in the Banana Room Sparrow in her "Room"
- Born: 8 July 1986 (age 40); Bath, England, United Kingdom
- Known for: Contemporary art, soft sculpture, street art, Young British Artists
- Notable work: The Cornershop, Sparrow Mart, 8 'till Late
- Website: sewyoursoul.co.uk

Lucy Sparrow (born 8 July 1986) is a contemporary artist from Bath, England. She works at the intersection of contemporary art and craft, primarily with felt, creating life-sized replicas and oversized soft versions of existing objects. Her work often features the SSRI prescription drug Prozac and Sparrow's interpretations of the retail environment, the intricacies of product branding throughout the modern era and her full-sized representations of supermarkets.

In the early stages of her career, Sparrow was involved in a number of group shows in the UK. She was a contributor to the Victoria and Albert Museum 2013 travelling street art collection alongside Banksy, Blek le Rat, Jamie Hewlett, Pure Evil, D*Face and urban illustrator Oh Jiwon. Her first solo show at Hoxton Gallery was Imitation, which recreated famous artworks out of felt, including a shark in a tank by Damien Hirst.

Following from her participation in group shows, Sparrow held her first UK solo show in 2014 before her first international solo show, 8 'till Late, in 2017 in the United States. Sparrow has continued to exhibit across America and Asia as well the UK.

== Solo shows ==
=== The Cornershop ===
In 2014, Sparrow created a Kickstarter campaign to fund her first major exhibition. The Cornershop was a soft sculpture recreation of a British newsagent's installed in a derelict cornershop in East London. It took Sparrow and her assistant seven months and 300 sq. metres of felt to create the 4,000 items on display.

=== The Warmongery ===
Following from The Cornershop, Sparrow created The Warmongery shop in Boxpark, in Bethnal Green, East London. She said that "The aim of Warmongery is to draw people's attention to what drives a few individuals to stockpile weapons and to ask why people are growing up in a world where a tiny minority feel so stressed and frustrated that they want to kill people.".

=== Madame Roxy's Erotic Emporium ===
In 2015, Sparrow made an installation of a sex shop in London's Soho, saying that her inspiration for the work was her five years working as a stripper in a nightclub in London, and that she wished to make people question the increasing suppression of some sexual practices in British law such as use of sex toys and contraception, and the gentrification of Soho. The exhibition was called Madame Roxy's Erotic Emporium and included pornographic magazines, whips, toys and jars full of sexually transmitted infections.

=== 8 'till Late ===
In June 2017, Sparrow installed a felt replica of a bodega in The Standard, High Line hotel in New York City. 8 'till Late opened on June 5 and included 9,000 items. The show was an instant success, requiring Sparrow to temporarily close the show after 7 days to restock. The show was intended to run for four weeks but closed nine days early after everything had sold.

=== Sparrow Mart ===
In August 2018, Sparrow exhibited Sparrow Mart, a life-sized replica of a supermarket. The supermarket was built in the Standard, a hotel in Downtown LA. Sparrow Mart had 31,000 felt grocery items, and took up over 2,800 square feet.

=== Triple Art Bypass ===
At the end of 2018, Sparrow put on Triple Art Bypass, an immersive installation at the international art fair, Art Basel in Miami. This displayed hand-painted felt replicas of medicines and anatomically-detailed organs. Sparrow and her staff carried out mock operations during the exhibition.

=== Lucy Sparrow's Felt Art Imaginarium ===
In July 2019, Sparrow created Lucy Sparrow's Felt Art Imaginarium at M Woods Museum in Beijing, China. This show includes 70 items remade from felt. The show opened on 6 July 2019, and was open until 7 October 2019. Sparrow created full-size versions of masterpieces from Michelangelo's David and da Vinci's Mona Lisa to Damien Hirst's shark in formaldehyde and Andy Warhol's Campbell's Soup Cans. Sparrow spent nine months creating the show, which took up 14 rooms within the museum.

=== Lucy's Delicatessen On 6th ===
In October 2019 Sparrow showed Lucy's Delicatessen On 6th in New York. The show was hosted at the Rockefeller Center on Sixth Avenue where she offered thirty thousand felt replications of perishable food items for sale. The show was organised by the Art Production Fund and ran for three weeks.

=== The Bourdon Street Chemist ===
Sparrow's Bourdon Street Chemist exhibition was in the Lyndsey Ingram gallery in Mayfair, London and ran from 19 April to 8 May 2021. She displayed a British pharmacy where every medicine bottle, ointment, and over-the-counter prescription was made entirely from felt. There were 15,000 hand-sewn and painted pieces.

=== The Billion Dollar Robbery ===
In October 2021, Sparrow installed The Billion Dollar Robbery at the Saatchi Gallery in London. This take on the world of high-stakes crime included an interactive tableau showing a fictional heist involving a fortune in felt money and artefacts, as well as a felt police car. Sparrow's heist also included felt replicas of artworks by Vincent van Gogh, Pablo Picasso, Leonardo da Vinci, and Edvard Munch.

=== Tampa Fresh Foods ===
Sparrow's largest installation to date, Tampa Fresh Foods, reimagined an American supermarket with food and goods made of felt. Running from 20 January 2022 until 20 February 2022 in Tampa, Florida, the installation included 50,000 handmade pieces. Fruits, vegetables, dairy products, and packaged goods were on display, made of felt.

=== The Queen's Platinum Jubilee Lunch ===
Sparrow's The Queen's Platinum Jubilee Lunch was a felt feast in honour of the Platinum Jubilee of Elizabeth II. Taking place from 6 February 2022 to 5 June 2022 at Buckingham Palace, London, Sparrow created a six-metre luncheon, with hand-sewn felt replicas of dishes, desserts and regal decorations.

=== Mr Frieze ===
In London from 12 October 2022 to 16 October 2022, Sparrow put on a guerrilla art show in the form of an ice cream van - Mr Frieze. Inspired by the Frieze Art Fair, Sparrow made a hand-sewn ice-cream van. The installation included a series of handmade Mr Whippy's, Twisters, Fabs, and a range of sodas and flakes.

=== McHappiness ===
McHappiness was at the Scope Miami Art Fair from 30 November 2022 until 4 December 2022. It included a range of food items from the fast-food chain, McDonald's. Burgers, fries, milkshakes, and chicken nuggets were all recreated in felt by Sparrow, with felt menu boards, counters, and packaging.

=== Add To Cart ===
Sparrow's Add To Cart installation took place at The Standard Hotel, Bangkok. Celebrating the street food of Thailand, sweets, and treats, the installation included khanom krok, Moo Ping, roti, fresh fruit, andsnacks. Set up to mimic the experience of real sweet shops and street food carts, the exhibition included interactive elements for visitors to browse and "add to cart".

=== Feltz Bagels ===
Sparrow's Feltz Bagels exhibition was centred around the New York City bagel shop. In October 2023 on East 3rd Street, the installation included hand-sewn replicas of bagels, toppings, and deli items. The bagels included flavours such as plain, cheese, sesame, and poppy seed, complemented by felt versions of toppings like cream cheese, lox, and capers.

=== Diptyque Festive Felt Delicatessen ===
Collaborating with Diptyque, Sparrow recreated a festive holiday collection that reimagined the brand's products in felt, with felt interpretations of the brand's candles, gift sets, and holiday packaging. It ran from 14 October 2024 to 6 January 2025, on New Bond Street, London and Rue Duphot, Paris.

=== Blessed Be The Fruit ===
Sparrow's Blessed Be The Fruit was shown at Scope Miami in 2024, and was a market installation with handmade fruit and produce, and Fatboy Slim to acting as a greengrocer in her installation.

=== The Bourdon Street Chippy ===
Sparrow's first show in the UK after four years, The Bourdon Street Chippy, showcased in London's Mayfair at the Lyndsey Ingram Gallery from August 1, 2025 to September 14, 2025. Sparrow recreated a classic British fish and chip shop out of 65,000 individually handmade felt pieces.

=== Sugar Rush ===
Sparrow's last show of 2025, Sugar Rush, was showcased at Art Miami Fair, Miami from December 2, 2025 to December 7, 2025. Sparrow recreated a traditional American candy shop entirely out of felt, including everything from Snickers, Peppermint Patties, and Twix.
