= Josephine Meckseper =

German artist

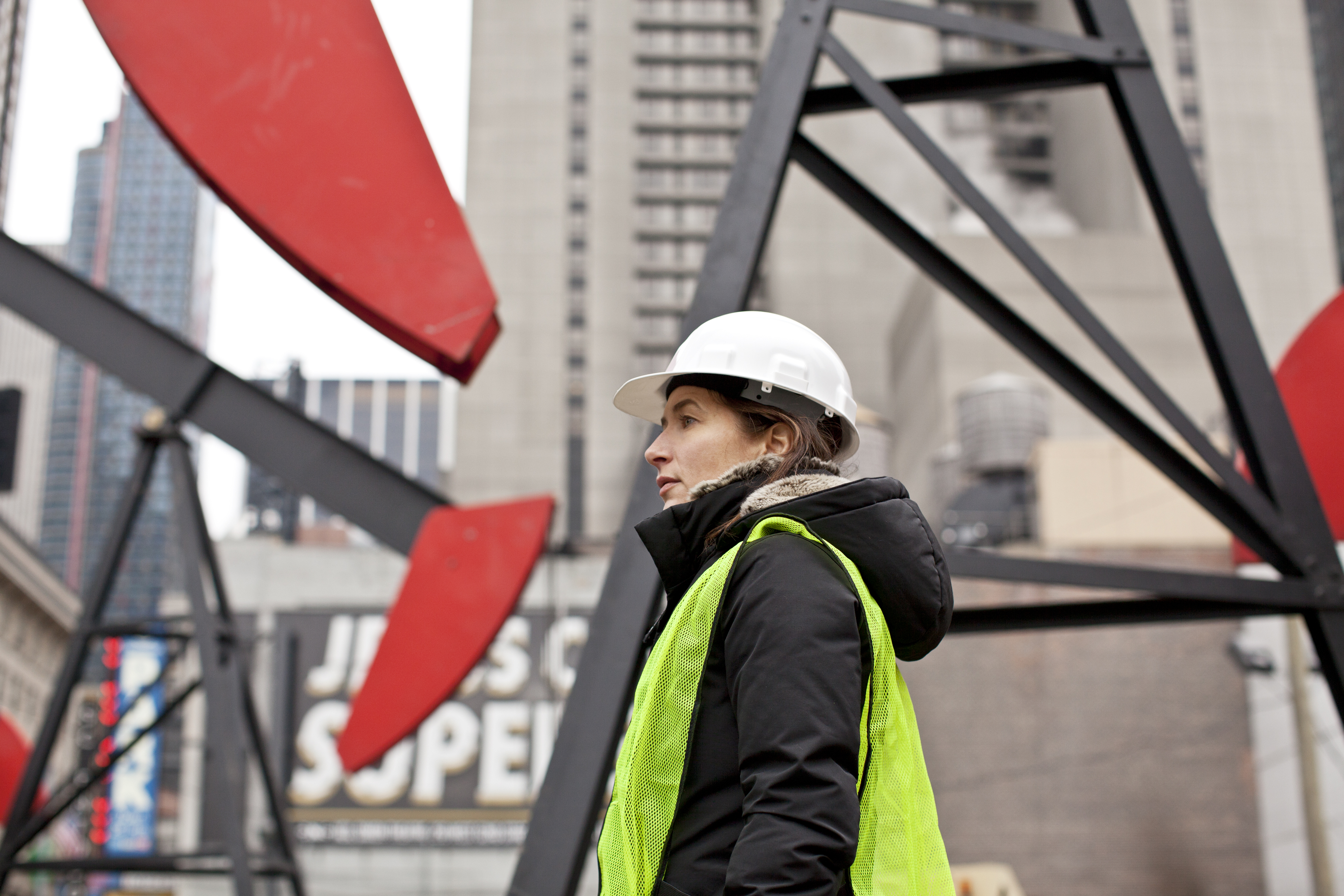
- Born: Lilienthal, Lower Saxony, Germany
- Known for: installation, sculpture, painting, photography, film
- Awards: John Simon Guggenheim Memorial Foundation Fellowship

Josephine Meckseper is a German-born artist, based in New York City. Her large-scale installations and films have been exhibited in various international biennials and museum shows worldwide.

== Life and education ==
Meckseper grew up in Worpswede, Germany, an artists' community founded at the beginning of the 20th century by a group of artists including Heinrich Vogeler (1872–1942). Vogeler was a diverse political artist and architect whose early work is situated within the Jugendstil movement, a German offspring of Art Nouveau. Paula Modersohn-Becker (1876–1907) and the writer and poet Rainer Maria Rilke (1875–1926), both lived in Worpswede for parts of their life.

Meckseper studied at Berlin University of the Arts in Germany from 1986 to 1990, and completed her MFA at the California Institute of the Arts in 1992, where she was influenced by artists Michael Asher and Charles Gaines, filmmaker Thom Andersen and literary critic and cultural theorist Sylvère Lotringer.

Meckseper's father is the renowned German artist Friedrich Meckseper (1936–2019).

== Work ==
=== Films ===
Early Work: Meckseper’s first films time at CalArts coincided with the Gulf War and the Los Angeles riots, 1992; during this politically-charged period her first installations and films reflected upon the actions of the Situationist International who advocated experimentation with the construction of situations, namely setting up environments as alternatives to capitalist order. Meckseper’s subsequent short films followed a similar principle and were filmed at Anti-capitalist and Anti-war protests in different parts of the world; as well as at the Mall of America in Minneapolis.

Meckseper’s film PELLEA[S], 2018 adapts the Symbolist play Pelléas et Mélisande (1892), weaving together fictional scenarios and dramatic footage captured by the artist at the 2017 presidential inauguration and the landmark women’s march that followed. Conflating contemporary political realities to Arnold Schoenberg’s modernist sound poem of Pelléas et Mélisande, the city of Washington, D.C. and its architecture become a context and site of departure, giving voice to debates around notions of gender found in the original play. Meckseper expresses through cinema the dramatic narratives and relationships contained within the universe of her signature glass and mirror vitrines, and draws a direct correlation to the way early Modernism and the avant-garde developed into a form of political and aesthetic resistance to classism and capitalism.

=== FAT Magazine ===
In 1994, Meckseper founded FAT Magazine, a conceptual magazine project distributed at newsstands and in supermarkets, but also exhibited in galleries and museums in the form of wallpaper. It was inspired by political theorist and radical publisher Jean-Paul Marat’s newspaper, published during the French Revolution called L'Ami du peuple and the avant-garde tradition of breaking down barriers between art and life. Since 1994 Meckseper has published five issues: Good and Evil (1994); Surrender (1995/1996); on Fire (1997); Overflow (1999); Objectification (2018).

=== Vitrines ===
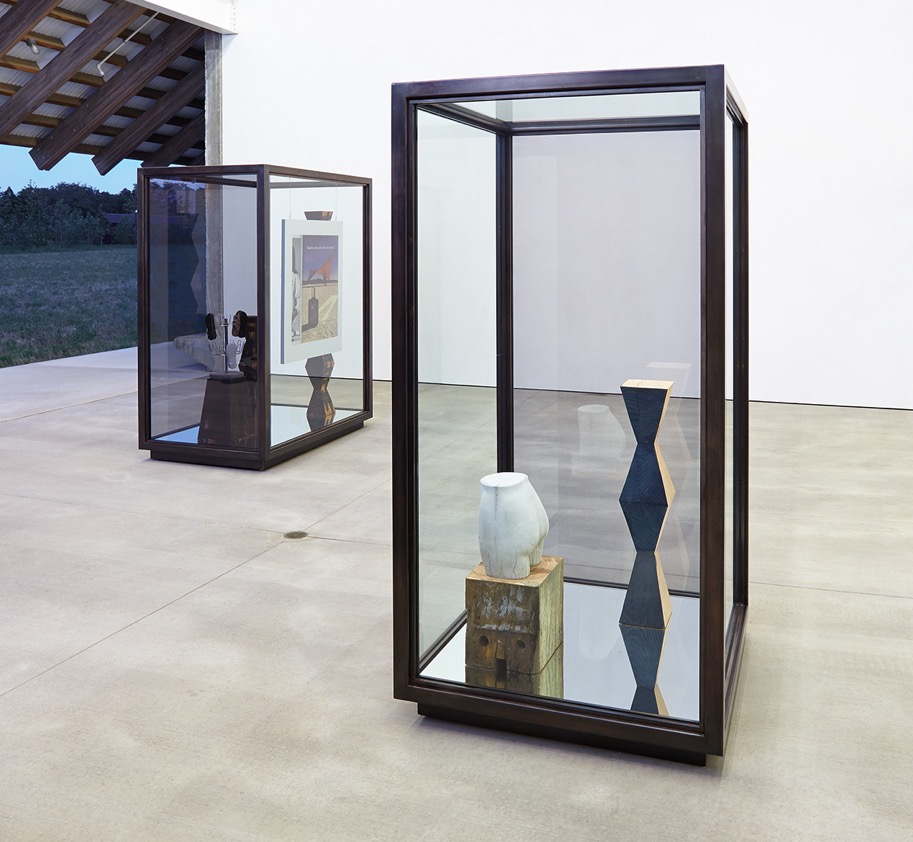
Installation view, “Josephine Meckseper,” Parrish Art Museum, Water Mill, NY, 2013

While Meckseper’s earliest vitrine works commented on contemporary consumer culture using the shop window as an example and focus point for civic unrest and protest, documented in her film works, her later steel and glass vitrines, allude to the political dimension of early modernist Bauhaus display architecture and design between World War I and II in Weimar Germany. Meckseper melds the aesthetic language of early modernism with her own objects and paintings and footage of historical and political undercurrents, taking on a similar function as Mies van der Rohe’s well-known designs and glass structures for art collections: art and art history are on display. Often contained within Meckseper’s displays are paintings that nod to 20th century European modernist art, such as Russian constructivism.

=== Manhattan Oil Project ===
In 2012, her public art project Manhattan Oil Project, commissioned by the Art Production Fund, was installed on the corner of 46th Street and 8th Avenue in New York City. Consisting of two monumental kinetic sculptures modeled after mid-20th century oil pumps, these 25 feet tall sculptures were inspired by oil pumps that the artist discovered in Electra, a boarded-up town once famous for being the pump jack capital of Texas. Placed in a vacant lot next to Times Square, the fully motorized pump jacks recalled the ruins of ghost towns, forgotten monuments of America's decaying industrial past.

In 2022, she received a Guggenheim Foundation Fellowship.

== Selected Exhibitions ==
- This is America: Selections from PAMM's Collection, Pérez Art Museum Miami, Florida, 2026
- Signs and Objects: Pop Art from the Guggenheim Collection, Guggenheim Bilbao, 2024
- Scenario for a Past Future, Hurley Gallery of the Lewis Center of the Arts, Princeton University, 2024
- Moment Choisis, Guild Hall, East Hampton, New York, 2021
- Josephine Meckseper, Frac des Pays de la Loire, Carquefou, and Hab Galerie, Nantes, 2019
- MOSTYN Contemporary Art Gallery, Llandudno, 2019
- America Is Hard to See, Whitney Museum of American Art, New York, 2015
- Storylines, Solomon R. Guggenheim Museum, New York, 2015
- 2X (I) ST, Neuer Aachener Kunstverein, 2014
- Pop Departures, Seattle Art Museum, 2015
- Taipei Biennial 2014-2015
- The Brancusi Effect, Kunsthalle Wien, 2014
- Mark Boulos and Josephine Meckseper, The Rose Art Museum at Brandeis University, Waltham, 2014
- Josephine Meckseper, Parrish Art Museum, Water Mill, 2013
- Manhattan Oil Project, Art Production Fund, The Last Lot, Times Square, 2012
- “Josephine Meckseper,” The FLAG Art Foundation, New York, 2011
- 2010 Whitney Biennial, Whitney Museum of American Art, New York, 2010
- Josephine Meckseper: Recent Films, Indianapolis Museum of Art, Indianapolis, 2009-2010
- Josephine Meckseper, Kunsthalle Münster, 2009-2010
- New Photography 2008: Josephine Meckseper and Mikhael Subotzky, Museum of Modern Art, New York, 2008-2009
- Josephine Meckseper, Migros Museum Für Gegenwartskunst, Zurich, 2009
- “Josephine Meckseper,” Gesellschaft für Aktuelle Kunst, Bremen, 2008
- “Josephine Meckseper,” Kunstmuseum Stuttgart, 2007

== Public collections ==
- Baltimore Museum of Art, Baltimore
- Brooklyn Museum of Art, Brooklyn
- Hammer Museum, University of California, Los Angeles
- FRAC Nord – Pas-de-Calais, Dunkerque
- Kunsthalle Bremen
- Kunstmuseum Stuttgart
- Metropolitan Museum of Art, New York
- Migros Museum für Gegenwartskunst, Zurich
- Museum of Modern Art, New York
- Museum on the Seam, Jerusalem
- National Gallery of Victoria, Melbourne
- Pérez Art Museum, Miami
- Princeton University Art Museum
- Rubell Family Collection, Miami
- Solomon R. Guggenheim Museum, New York
- Whitney Museum of American Art, New York

== Filmography ==
- 04.30.92 (1992)
- East German Rooms with a View (2001)
- Die Göttliche Linke [The Divine Left] (2003)
- Rest in Peace (2004)
- March on Washington to End the War on Iraq, 9/24/05 (2005)
- Untitled (Life After Bush Conference and One Year Anniversary of the Invasion of Iraq Protest, New York, 3/20/04) (2005)
- March for Peace, Justice and Democracy, 04/29/06, New York City (2007)
- 0% Down (2008)
- Mall of America (2009)
- Shattered Screen (2009)
- Amalgamated (2010)
- DDYANLALSATSY (2010)
- Contaminator (2010)
- Pellea[s] (2018)
