= Fatimah Tuggar =

Nigerian artist

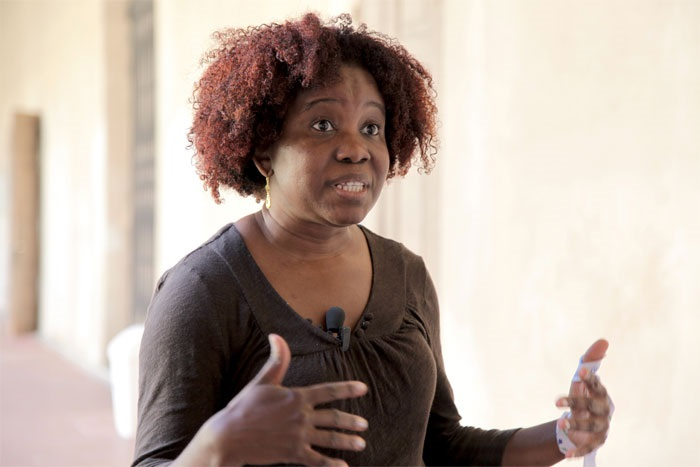
- Born: August 15, 1967 (age 58); Kaduna, Nigeria
- Education: Whitney Museum of American Art ISP Program Yale University Kansas City Art Institute
- Known for: Visual art, installation art, Web-based Interactive Media, Sculpture
- Awards: 2019 Guggenheim Fine Arts Fellow

Fatimah Tuggar (born 15 August 1967) is an interdisciplinary artist born in Nigeria and based in the United States. Tuggar uses collage and digital technology to create works that investigate dominant and linear narratives of gender, race, and technology. She is currently an associate professor of AI in the Arts: Art & Global Equity at the University of Florida in the United States.

== Early life and education ==
Tuggar was born in Kaduna, Nigeria, in 1967. Tuggar studied at Blackheath School of Art in London, England, and received a BFA from Kansas City Art Institute in the United States in 1992. She completed her MFA in sculpture at Yale University in 1995, and conducted a one-year postgraduate independent study at the Whitney Museum of American Art from 1995 to 1996. She also attended Kano Corona and Queens College Yaba in Nigeria before attending Convent of the Holy Family in Littlehampton, Sussex in England.

== Career and Works ==
Tuggar creates images, objects, installations and web-based instructive media artworks. They juxtapose scenes from African and Western daily life. This draws attention to the process involved and considers gendered subjectivity, belonging, and notions of progress.

=== Materials and themes ===
Taking inspiration from German Dada and photomontage artists Hannah Hoch and John Heartfield, Tuggar's work incorporates aspects of collage to question power dynamics within dominate visual language. Sourcing photographs she shoots herself and found materials from Western commercials, magazines and archival footage, Tuggar digitally fuses images together to expose erasures in dominant representations of gender, race, geography, domestic labor, technology, and globalized capitalism while re-centering African Diasporic identities.

Tuggar uses technological innovations in her work as both a medium and a method to critique Westerns concepts of linear progress. The objects usually involve some kind of bricolage; combining two or more objects from Western Africa and their Western equivalent to talk about electricity, infrastructure, access and the reciprocal influences between technology and cultures. Similarly, her computer montages and video collage works bring together both video and photographs she shoots herself and found materials from commercials, magazines and archival footage. Meaning for Tuggar seems to lie in these juxtapositions which explore how media affects our daily lives. Overall Tuggar's work uses strategies of deconstruction to challenge our perceptions and attachments to accustomed ways of looking. Her body of work conflates ideas about race, gender and class; disturbing our notions of subjectivity. Her work reflects her multifaceted identity and challenges the idea of a homogeneous Africa.

=== Digital photomontages ===
Fatimah Tuggar began making digital photomontages in 1995. Her early works interrogates media representations and Western perspectives of technology and labor by women in Nigeria. Spinner and the Spindle (1995) and Working Woman (1997) exemplify her early work using computer montage to digitally fuse images of Western technology with contemporary rural Nigerian women to trouble prominent and simple narratives of contemporary Africa as isolated from Western technology and progress through digital divide. Tuggar use of collage and mise-en-abyme in works such as Working Woman, where the image of the Nigerian woman is repeated endlessly on the computer screen Tuggar has inserted next to her, highlights the complexities of self-representation through production and reproduction in the rise of digital disseminated information. Three of Tuggar's early photomontages, Spinner and the Spindle (1995), Village Spells (1996), and In Touch (1998) were included in a 2002 special edition of Social Text by Alondra Nelson to discuss the recent rise of Afrofuturism. Lady and the Maid (2000), Bedroom (2001), and Cake People (2001) re-imagine representations of Black women and domestic technologies by inserting African Diasporic narratives and iconography into commercialized White domestic spaces in the mid-twentieth century. Through a lens of Black Female Subjectivity, Tuggar's computer montages question power dynamics of race, gender, and technology through colonialist and consumptive frameworks.

Recent photomontage works by Tuggar include Home's Horizons (2019), a diptych with an adobe home with a thatched roof and woven fence mirrored above a two-story house with a white picket fence. The second photomontage mirrors a small boat with a spacecraft, both connected by a parachute and water. Using images of thatched roofs and woven fences seen in earlier works such as Cake People and Working Woman, Tuggar continues to incorporate themes of technology and domestic spaces to examine geographic and cultural liminal spaces as places of both complicity and possibility.

=== Video and sculptures ===
Incorporating similar methods of photomontage into video installations, Tuggar's Fusion Cuisine (2000) co-produced with The Kitchen during her Artist Production Residency, juxtaposes Cold War era American advertisements of domestic technologies targeted toward white American middle-class women and contemporary footage of African women videotaped by the artist in Nigeria. Using and critiquing technology in visual language, Fusion Cuisine shifts continuously between the archival filmstrips of postwar fantasies of modern life and suburbia and images of domestic work and play in Nigeria. Fusion Cuisine examines dominant visual language in domestic consumer technology through a transnational lens to re-evaluate colonial concepts of progress, exposing the racial and geographic erasures to imagine new visions of the future and visual narratives. Her works comment on potentially sensitive themes such as ethnicity, technology and post-colonial culture. The artist chooses not to extend a didactic message, but rather to elucidate cultural nuances that go beyond obvious cross-cultural comparisons.

Tuggar's sound sculptures continue to incorporate themes of hybridity and technology through physical and conceptual bricolage. Her 1996 sculpture titled Turntable, Tuggar uses raffia discs in place of vinyl records, referencing the ways in which the introduction of the gramophone influenced the development of local language. Because of the physical similarly between the vinyl and fai-fai in many Northern Nigerian languages vinyl record get its name from raffia disc. For instance in Hausa the raffia disc is called fai-fai and vinyl is fai-fain gramophone. Turntable was lost in 2002 and remade by Tuggar in 2010 under the title Fai-Fain Gramophone. Paying homage to crafted technology used in domestic labor and music, Tuggar highlights versatile tools used by women in Nigeria by incorporating fai-fai disks, woven by women from raffia, in place of vinyl records. The woven disks spin in emulation of a turntable, while a hidden digital recording of Nigerian musician Barmani Chogo, plays from the sculpture.

Other sound sculptures by Tuggar include Broom (1996) and The Talking Urinal (1992) both of which reference Surrealism and Dada's questioning of object function and representation.

=== Augmented reality and web-based work ===
In her computer montages and video collages, Tuggar brings together images that explore cultural nuances and the different relationships between people and power structures. In her web-based interactive works, participants can create their own collages by selecting animated elements and backgrounds. This process allows participants to construct or disrupt non-linear narratives. Changing Space (2002), a participatory online exhibition by Tuggar with the Art Production Fund used audience interaction in a virtual space to question power dynamics of authorship and representation of modern African art in galleries and museums.

Her interactive animated collage, "Transient Transfer", allows participants to create collages from scenes in Greensboro in 2011 or the Bronx in 2008 (see "Street Art, Street Life: From 1950s to Now " at The Bronx Museum of the Arts, New York). In her 2006 web project, Triad Raid, created as part of Rethinking Nordic Colonialism, Tuggar "engages the viewer/participant in a potentially loaded power space of making choices, or not choosing. Action or lack of action in this digital environment animates elements to create a dynamic collage. This collage is constructed from: Characters icons and totems, Context landscapes and commodities, and Behaviors actions and interactions between all these elements. This encourages the creation of temporary non-linear narratives, which can be constructed or disrupted based on the choices made by the participant. A key factor is the awareness of choice and the consequences of exercising or choosing not to exercise this potential power."

Continuing concepts of technology, labor, hybridity, and globalized capitalism, Tuggar's recent use of Augmented Reality and Virtual Reality in participatory works include Desired Dwellings (2009) and the commissioned work by The Davis Museum Deep Blue Wells (2019). Deep Blue Wells explores the history and contemporary collaborative process and labor of indigo dye wells and fabric dyeing in Kano, and contends with the effects of globalized capitalism.

== Exhibitions ==
Tuggar has shown her work in group exhibitions at the Museum of Modern Art, New York, the New Museum of Contemporary Art, and at international biennial exhibitions such as the Moscow Biennale of Contemporary Art 2005, Palais des Beaux-Arts, Brussels 2003, Centre Georges Pompidou in Paris 2005, and the Bamako Biennal, Mali, 2003. Tuggar's work will be included in the 2023 Sharjah Biennial in United Arab Emirates.

Additional exhibitions include:

- 2019 Fatimah Tuggar: Home's Horizons, The Davis Museum at Wellesley College
- 2019 Charlotte Street Awards Exhibition, Kemper Museum of Contemporary Art, Kansas City, Missouri
- 2019 Knowledge, The Spencer Museum of Art, The University of Kansas, Lawrence, Kansas
- 2017, 2018 Flow of Forms/Forms of Flow, Museum am Rothenbaum, Hamburg, Germany and Kunstraum, Munchen, Germany
- 2015 Appropriation Art: Finding Meaning in Found-Image Collage The Bascom: A Center for the Visual Arts, Highlands, North Carolina
- 2013 In/Visible Seams Mechanical Hall Gallery, University of Delaware, Newark, DE
- 2012 Fatimah Tuggar, Institute for Women and Art, Mary Hana Women Artists Series Galleries, Rutgers University, New Brunswick, New Jersey
- 2012, 2011, 2010 The Record: Contemporary Art and Vinyl, Nasher Museum of Art, Duke University and The Institute of Contemporary Art, Boston
- 2012 Harlem Postcards, Studio Museum Harlem, New York, NY
- 2011 Dream Team, Works from 1995-2011, GreenHill Center for North Carolina Art, Greensboro, North Carolina
- 2010 One Blithe Day, Link Media Wall, Perkins Library, Duke University, Durham, North Carolina
- 2009 Tell Me Again: A Concise Retrospective, Franklin Humanities Institute, Duke University, Durham, NC
- 2009 Desired Dwellings: Project for an Immersive Virtual Environment, Duke Immersive Virtual Environment, Duke University, Durham, North Carolina
- 2009 On Screen: Global Intimacy Artspace at Kansas City Art Institute, Kansas City, MO
- 2005 Inna's Recipe, Indiana Black Expo's Summer Celebration, Cultural Arts Pavilion, Indianapolis, Indiana
- 2005 Rencontres de Bamako: Biennale Africaine de la Photographie: Telling Time
- 2002 Changing Space, Art Production Fund, New York, New York
- 2002 Tempo, Museum of Modern Art, New York, New York
- 2002 Africaine: Candice Breitz, Wangechi Mutu, Tracey Rose, and Fatimah Tuggar, The Studio Museum in Harlem, New York, New York
- 2001 Empire/State: Artists Engaging Globalization The Art Gallery of the Graduate Center, The City University of New York
- 2000 Poetics and Power Museum of Contemporary Art Cleveland
- 2000 Crossing the Line Queens Museum of Art
- 2000 The New World, The Vices and Virtues, Bienal de Valencia, Spain Bienal de Maia, Porto, Portugal
- 2000 Celebrations Galeria Joao Graça, Lisbon, Portugal
- 2000 At the Water Tap Greene Naftali Gallery, New York
- 2000 Tell Me Again, The Kitchen, New York, New York
- 2000 Fusion Cuisine, The Kitchen, New York, New York, Le Musee Chateau, Annecy, France
- 2000 Fatimah Tuggar, Art and Public, Geneva, Switzerland
- 1999 The Passion and the Wave 6th International Istanbul Biennial
- 1999 Beyond Technology: Working in Brooklyn Brooklyn Museum of Art, New York
- 1998 Village Spells Plexus.org
- 1992 Revolving Room, The Founders Gallery, Kansas City, Missouri
- 1992 Between Space and Light, Leedy-Volkus Art Center, Kansas City, Missouri
