= David Brooks (artist) =

American artist

David Brooks (born 1975) is an artist based in New York City. He won the Rome Prize in 2019. He was featured in the Art21 series on PBS.

== Work ==
Brooks' work explores the interaction between humans and their natural and synthetic environments. His past projects include a disassembled combine harvester at the Aldrich Contemporary Art Museum and a buried tractor at the Storm King Art Center. He created Desert Rooftops, as part of an Art Production Fund commission in the Last Lot in Times Square.
