= Galerie Eva Presenhuber =

Coordinates: 47.4106515°N 9.3034687°E

Galerie Eva Presenhuber is a contemporary art gallery, owned by Eva Presenhuber, with locations in Zurich, Switzerland (since 2003) and Vienna (since 2022).

== History ==
Presenhuber founded Galerie Eva Presenhuber in October 2003 in Zurich, with an inaugural exhibition of paintings by Verne Dawson; Dawson, an American painter, continues to be represented by Presenhuber. Several artists whose careers Presenhuber helped launch in the 1990s continue to be part of the gallery program, including Ugo Rondinone, Doug Aitken, Joe Bradley, and Liam Gillick.

After several years exhibiting in the Löwenbräu Areal, Presenhuber opened a secondary space in the Diagonal building at the former Maag Areal. The new gallery – designed by Andreas Fuhrimann and Gabrielle Hächler architects – opened with a major exhibition by Austrian artist Franz West in April 2011, and was Presenhuber's only Zurich location from late 2017 to early 2020. In Spring 2017, Presenhuber opened an exhibition space designed by Annabelle Selldorf in New York, and the inaugural show by Austrian painter Tobias Pils was his first solo exhibition in the city.

In June 2020, Eva Presenhuber opened a second location in Zurich at Waldmannstrasse 6.

In April 2022, Eva Presenhuber expanded further by opening a gallery in Vienna.

== Artists ==
Among others, Galerie Eva Presenhuber has been representing the following living artists:

- Joe Bradley
- John Dilg
- Trisha Donnelly
- Carroll Dunham
- Shara Hughes (since 2018)
- Ugo Rondinone
- Tschabalala Self (since 2019)
- Peter Fischli David Weiss (since 1983)
- Henry Taylor

In addition, the gallery handles several estates, including the following:

- Jay DeFeo
- John Giorno
