= Seven Magic Mountains =

Art installation in Nevada

- The sculpture in 2018
- Artist: Ugo Rondinone
- Year: 2011–2016
- Medium: Boulders and Day-Glo
- Movement: Pop art
- Dimensions: 30–35 ft (9.1–10.7 m)
- Weight: Each boulder is between 10 and 25 short tons (9,100 and 22,700 kg)
- 35.8399°N 115.2710°W
- Owner: Nevada Museum of Art
- Website: sevenmagicmountains.com

Seven Magic Mountains is an art installation in Ivanpah Valley, along the far southern end of Las Vegas Boulevard. It was created by the Swiss artist Ugo Rondinone, and commissioned and financed by the Art Production Fund and the Nevada Museum of Art. It is one of the largest land-based installations in the United States completed in the last forty years. It receives 325,000 visitors annually.

== History ==
Rondinone had previously created Human Nature, an installation in Rockefeller Center that exhibited stone figures, as he wanted to show "something raw within an artificial environment". Seven Magic Mountains is the direct opposite—something artificial in a natural environment. The boulders were cut, cored, and stacked in December 2015. They were painted in April 2016. When it opened on May 11, 2016, it was originally only going to stand for two years, until December 31, 2018. However, it had so many visitors that the exhibition was extended for three more years and extended again until May 31, 2027. In 2025, a monolith of unknown origin was installed at the instillation.

As of 2024, the installation could be relocated north to Washoe County.

== Description ==
The sculptures are between 30 and 35 ft (9.1 and 10.7 m) tall and are inspired by the hoodoos in the Western United States, where the installation is located. The 33 locally sourced boulders are held together by a backbone and are covered in two layers of Day-Glo, which is activated by the sun. As of 2022, the boulders have had to be repainted twice due to weather. Each boulder weighs between 10 and 25 short tons (9,100 and 22,700 kg) and is stacked in groups ranging from three to six. The artwork is located near Jean Lake and has a backdrop of the McCullough Range.

The project cost $3.5 million and was sponsored by Aria Resort and Casino and International Game Technology. 20% of the budget went into overcoming laws that prevented the installation from being constructed due to it being on 3 acres (1.2 ha) of land owned by the Bureau of Land Management. It took three years for the BLM to permit the artwork, with the project ending up being granted a "site" type right-of-way permit for thirty years. Climbing the artwork is prohibited as one may fall. To reduce the artist's liability if someone does do this, NRS 41.517 was passed.

The Reno Gazette-Journal estimated that more than two million people have taken photographs at the sculpture for Instagram. Vogue used the installation in a photo shoot in April 2017. The site is commonly vandalized, as it is not staffed, and the frequency of cleanup commonly changes.
