= Ugo Rondinone =

Swiss visual artist (born 1964)

- Born: Ugo Rondinone; November 30, 1964 (age 61); Brunnen, Switzerland
- Occupation: Sculptor
- Notable work: Human Nature (2013); Seven Magic Mountains (2016)
- Spouses: Eva Presenhuber (m. 1988–2012) John Giorno (m. 2017–2019)
- Website: ugorondinone.com

Moonrise East (2008), Basel, San Francisco

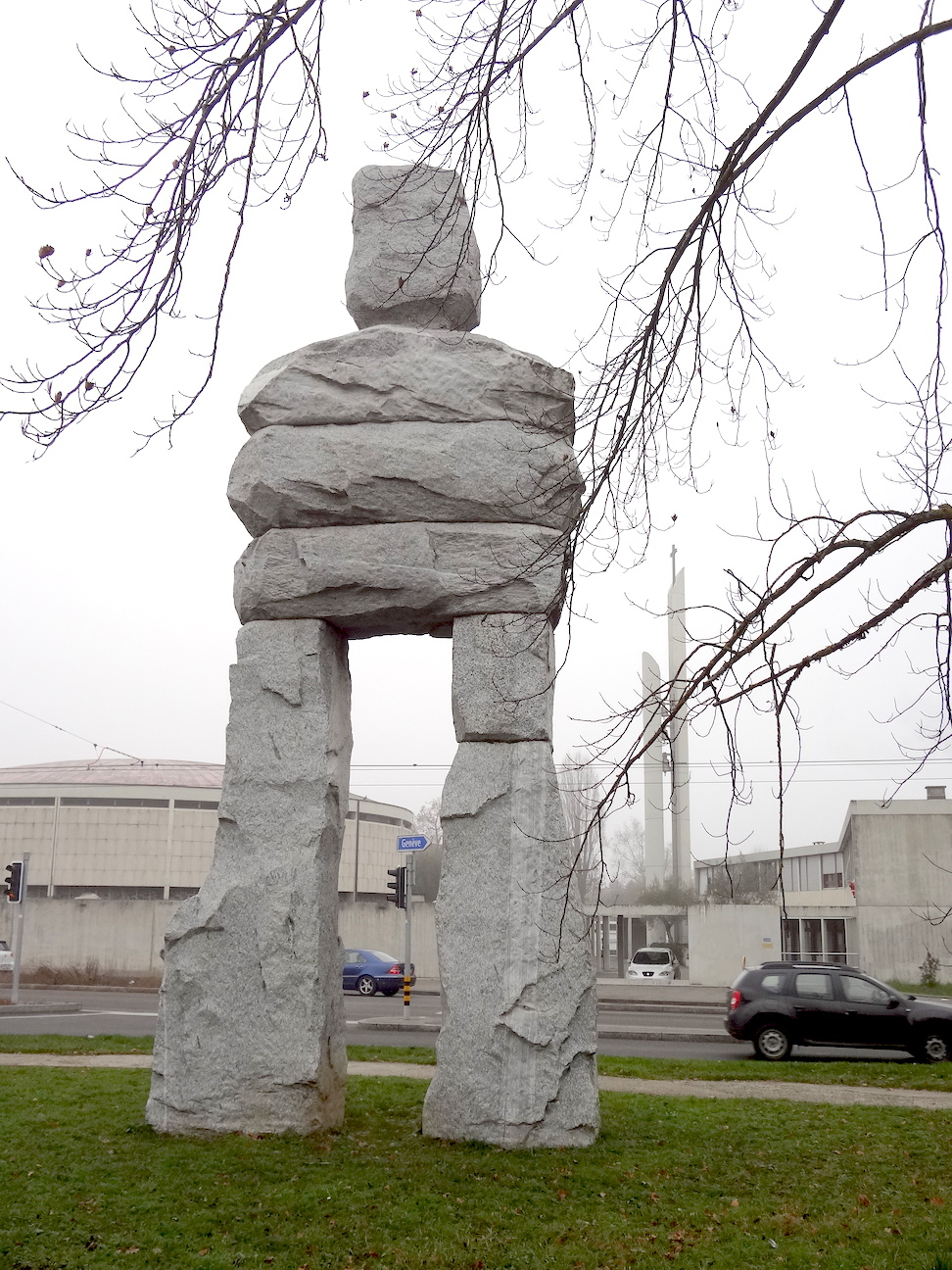
The Wise (2014), 10 meters high, 84 tons

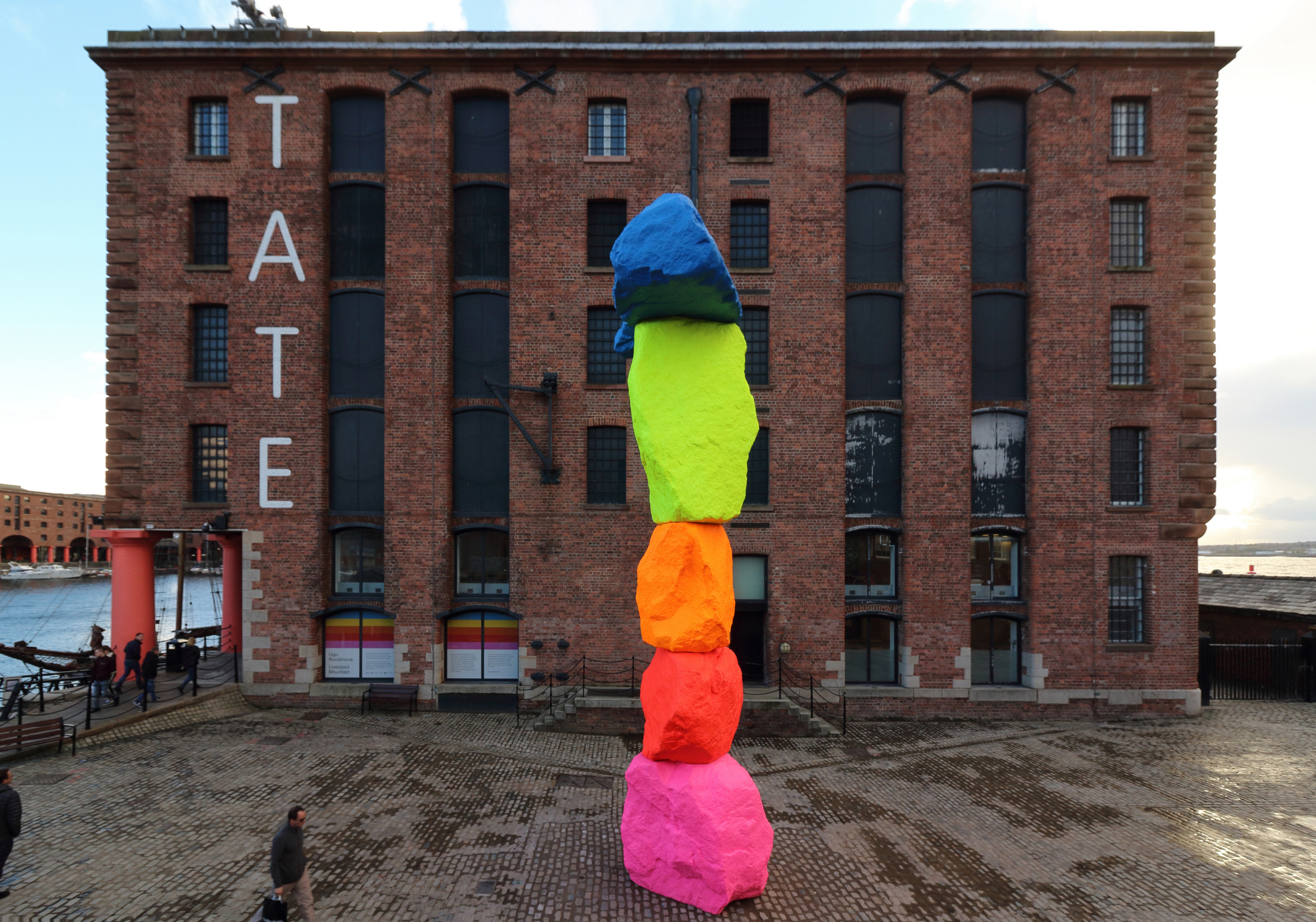
Liverpool Mountain installed outside Tate Liverpool in October 2018

Ugo Rondinone (born November 30, 1964) is a Swiss-born contemporary artist.

Rondinone is known for his temporary, large-scale land art sculpture, Seven Magic Mountains (2016–2021), with its seven fluorescently-painted totems of large, car-size stones stacked 32 feet (9.8 m) high.

== Early life and education ==
Ugo Rondinone was born in 1964 to Italian parents, Benito and Eufemia Rondinone, in the resort town of Brunnen, Switzerland.

His father, Benito, was born in Matera, Italy, an ancient city built into limestone cliffs and the site of Mel Gibson's 2004 biblical drama film The Passion of the Christ (2004) and Pier Paolo Pasolini's 1964 biblical drama film The Gospel According to St. Matthew.

Benito was a mason who built stone walls by hand. Benito grew up in Sassi di Matera, a series of Paleolithic-era cave dwellings, which was in 1993 declared a Unesco World Heritage Site but was, during Benito's childhood, still an active community. Conditions were unsanitary and unsafe, and it was ultimately the outcry that followed Carlo Levi's 1945 memoir of his time there, Christ Stopped at Eboli, that led the government to relocate Sassi di Matera's residents, including Benito Rondinone's family, to nearby low-income housing.

His father's upbringing has contributed greatly to Rondinone's work, influencing his extensive body of work in stone as well as his interest in southern Italy's olive trees. In a 2013 article for The New York Times, David Colman wrote about the piece of limestone that Rondinone wears around his neck on a leather strap, which had been passed down in his family for many years: "A stone, un sasso, drilled with a hole, it was worn around the neck as a kind of proto-ID. Different stones were worn, 24-7, by different workers in the Sassi, depending on which landowner they were bound to. Benito had never worn it, having left the area while still young, but his father, Frederico, had worn it and given it to his son, just as Frederico's father had worn it and given it to him, and his father before him."

Rondinone's brother Luca, seven years his junior, lives in Brunnen. In Brunnen, Rondinone grew up trilingual, speaking French, Italian, and German.

Rondinone moved to Zurich in 1983 to become the assistant to Hermann Nitsch and studied at the University of Applied Arts Vienna, from 1986 to 1990, where he studied with the artist Bruno Gironcoli. Rondinone also studied under Ernst Caramelle. In 1985, while in school, Rondinone met fellow student Eva Presenhuber, who would become his art dealer in Zurich and his nominal wife.

In 1997, Rondinone was accepted into MoMA PS1's International Studio Program and moved to New York City, where he continues to live and work. In New York, he began a relationship with the artist and poet John Giorno, after the two met at a poetry reading at New York City's St. Mark's Church in-the-Bowery in which Giorno was participating. Rondinone and Giorno collaborated on a 1999 exhibition, which developed into a romantic relationship which would last until Giorno's death in 2019.

== Career ==
Rondinone emerged as an artist in the 1990s. His paintings are noted for their brightly colored, concentric rings of target-shapes; and strictly black-and-white landscapes of gnarled trees.

Since 1997, Rondinone has included the practice of making signs in his varied oeuvre; he takes phrases from pop songs and everyday exclamations and makes them into rainbow-hued, neon-lit sculptures, including Hell, Yes (2001). Another series of installations, Clockwork for Oracles (2008–2010) consists of mirrored works that are hung salon-style over a wall of pages from the local paper sourced at the time of installation.

Rondinone later created a series that includes bronze-cast birds (primitive, 2011), horses (primal, 2013) and fish (primordial, 2018).

Rondinone’s totem-like figures have been installed all over the world, from the Jardin des Tuileries in Paris (2009) to the Yokohama Triennale (2011). In 2013, he exhibited an installation called Human Nature at Rockefeller Center in New York City, a group of nine monumental figures made of rough-hewn slabs of bluestone from a quarry in Northern Pennsylvania, resembling rudimentary rock totems. Similarly, Soul (2013) is a group of thirty-seven figures from bluestone found in upstate New York, ranging from just under three feet to nearly seven feet tall. Another sculptural installation, Vocabulary of Solitude (2016), involves forty-five sculptures of clowns named after and positioned doing everyday tasks such as "wake, sit, walk and shower".

=== Early works ===
If one refers to the official index of Rondinone's works, his corpus originates with a series of sculptures of flowers in plaster and Vaseline, dated 1988. The artist commonly starts his trajectory, however, with landscapes drawn in India ink, in a style reminiscent of both 17th-century Dutch art and German Romanticism.

Based on preparatory drawings he made during country walks outside of Vienna, these nostalgic landscapes introduced a number of elements that can also be found in his later works: a protocol leading him to create artworks based on handmade "studies" that, via several "transports" or transfers potentially incorporating steps delegated to independent contractors, result in another image; an attraction to variations on a single theme; the use of "cycles" and "systems", in particular those conveyed by nomenclature in the titles he attributes to his works; and last, the creation of work pertaining to his autobiography.

Those early landscapes were, in fact, made in response to loss – the artist's partner, Manfred Kirchner, having died of AIDS in 1988. "In the midst of the AIDS crisis," Rondinone recalls, "I turned away from my grief and found a spiritual guard rail in nature, a place for comfort, regeneration and inspiration. In nature, you enter a space where the sacred and the profane, the mystical and the secular vibrate against one another."

The first landscape was painted on February 23, 1989. Rondinone would show three others, produced in March, June and October, respectively, in an exhibition at the Kunstmuseum Luzern in Switzerland that same year, in which his approach to presentation might be considered the matrix of his exhibitions to come.

=== An Art of Exhibition ===
One cannot dissociate Rondinone's exhibitions from his works, which as a result evolve in forms of presentation that are ceaselessly reinvented by the artist. As with the way in which his works are subject to variations, he modifies the way their "content" and "container" are shown from one exhibition to the next. These modifications can be infinitesimal or can, on the contrary, involve profound changes. They can open up new perspectives or displace them. And they can involve the elaboration of a "scenario" so that for each presentation, the work or works can be seen as if never shown before. Exhibitions are also a way for the artist to play on vectors that are complementary, if not contradictory; a work shown by Rondinone in a specific context is often juxtaposed with "opposite" proposals.

This can be seen with his landscapes. In the 1989 exhibition, his India-ink drawings were arranged in a "homogeneous" manner, while a second exhibition, held in the same location a year later and devoted to his 1990 landscapes, presented them next to a temporary wall made of wooden slats painted in white. An extension of the gallery entrance, this wall isolated the exhibition system from the space's facade and dissociated it from its "daily life", creating a sort of corridor whose confined quality—conducive to spiritual and introspective contemplation—offered a powerful contrast with the openness to the world and nature suggested by the landscapes. The first "wall" imagined by Rondinone, it permitted him to invite a new "protagonist" or "figure" into a work for which the exhibition space would be the preferred stage and setting.

After his first exhibition at the Galerie Walcheturm in Zurich in 1991, in which he perpetuated the "narrative" of the Kunstmuseum Luzern and emphasized the "duality" formed by landscapes open to the world and a space cut off from it, in 1992, Rondinone unveiled a family of works that was resolutely other—his sun paintings. Related in their own way to spiritual withdrawal and "mindless activity", these paintings are considered by the artist as a continuation of the landscapes, except, of course, for the fact that they replace the “figurative” drawings in black and white with a chromatic spectrum that is as iridescent and hypnotic as it is "abstract". Distant. A sort of diurnal counterpart to the nocturnal scenes, reflecting once again the law of contrasts that is so prominent in Rondinone's work.

=== The 1990s ===
The 1990s were marked by a dizzying proliferation of works, the "domino effect" set up by the artist and fueled by the "exhibition-as-form" that gives his art a rhizomic perspective. One need only look at the different pairings that articulate themselves around the sun paintings to assess the wide range of possibilities. Other "figures" independent of these paintings also emerged.

This is notably the case with heyday, which appears to be nearly identical to the exhibition Cry Me a River, organized once again at the Galerie Walcheturm in Zurich in 1995. A sculptural self-portrait of the artist placed in a sterile environment—but in contrast to previous presentations in the gallery, a space no longer closed off from the urban landscape outside it—the work, inspired by the fictional character Jean Des Esseintes in Joris-Karl Huysmans's 1884 novel À rebours (Against Nature), offers up yet another variation on the ideas of turning inward on oneself and spiritual withdrawal.

Another "figure" entered Rondinone's corpus in the 1990s: the clown. Clowns appeared in his work at the beginning of the decade and were then portrayed in several different mediums and modes of presentation: in drawings or a mural; in photographs, videos or performances; and in installations or sculptures, once again demonstrating the artist's impressive latitude.

Examples include two groups of hyperrealistic sculptures conceived between 2000 and 2002 (if there were anywhere but desert) and between 2014 and 2016 (vocabulary of solitude), the latter a spectacular work consisting of forty-five "passive" clowns scattered throughout the exhibition space. "As a group," Rondinone explains, "the forty-five clowns represent one single person, dividing its twenty-four-hour day into forty-five homebound activities (...) creating a cycle of a twenty-four-hour loop."

Time is actually a recurring theme for the artist and, as shown in the vocabulary of solitude, it can take on an appearance that is as surprising as it is unexpected. According to Ludovico Pratesi, Rondinone "situates his art outside of the real time, projecting it onto an atemporal dimension where each spectator can create his or her own time and space within an experiential work, a Gesamtkunstwerk through which everyone can reflect on life and the condition of the human being, or, as the artist suggests, as 'an escape from the outside world toward the inner one.'" From there, one finds through the theme of temporality, which is omnipresent in his work, another iteration of the idea of withdrawal or retreat, and of the idea of a cycle.

In the 1990s, Rondinone also consolidated his exploration of two motifs already present or previously addressed in his work: the tree and the window, which were brought together in an exhibition in 1997 at the Galleria Bonomo in Rome. Returning to certain motifs, shifting their perspectives and opening them up to new elaborations are all part of the artist's modus operandi, a way for him to signify that a family of works is never static—that it can give rise to survivals or mutations, to transfigurations and metamorphoses, to new dialogues that have not yet been imagined.

The trees from 1997 are "protected" with adhesive tape, "protection" and "isolation" also being processes that are subject to recurrent and highly diversified adaptations in Rondinone's work. The different layers of paint applied to "objects" or "environments" conceived by the artist come to mind, as do the themes of disguise or travesty and of masks that frequently inform his work.

Disguises. They create a separation, a distance based on the principle of antagonism. This concept traverses and defines the artist's entire trajectory. Black and white or shades of grey on one side, color on the other. Masculine and feminine. Silence and sound. Day and night. Openness and withdrawal. Inside and outside. Abstract and the figurative. Personal and impersonal. Private and public. And in each case, depending on the "scenario" chosen or imagined by the artist, there are subtle variations in terms of (dis)junctions and (im)permeabilities between these polarities.

=== The 2000s ===
drittermaerzzweitausendundelf (2011)

The proliferation (of families) of works has continued into the 21st century in a growing number of exhibitions or installations, making it possible for the artist to foster a narrative that is increasingly diversified. Whether in galleries or art institutions, in urban spaces or natural settings, these presentations never cease to expand the "domino effect" established at the beginning of his career.

It should also be noted that in parallel to his art, Rondinone has added yet another achievement to his list of accomplishments by officiating as a curator, in exhibitions in which he would also promote a vision inspired by the theme of antagonism. In keeping with the previous development of his ideas, the artist also expanded during this period on certain "themes" or "motifs", subjecting them to variations and transformations, displacements and phenomena of survival, while at the same time also inventing new ones, always in the interest of generating dialogues between families of works. Many of these are affiliated with a postminimalist aesthetic and are articulated in sculptures, at times associated with work on sound and language, and renegotiate geometric forms that can be closed or open depending on the context.

Some shapes or subjects from this period, such as the wall, window or door, are solidly placed in the context of his previous works; others chart an entirely new course. Walls, windows and doors are motifs that for Rondinone can also represent a threshold, a passageway. A border. A limit that makes it possible to move from one place or atmosphere to another. They can be "isolators", at times cutting us off from the outside world, at others making us permeable to it, in some cases even interlinking these "opposites". Another reoccurrence: some families of works are linked to historic works of art, such as his metal windows (the first created between 2015 and 2018), which reference the oeuvre of Caspar David Friedrich.

To cite Bob Nickas, Rondinone's production is an "expanded field with many centers". In recent years, the artist has continued to assert the law of contrasts and opposites, with the contraposition of works in black and white; others in gray, "earthy” or mineral tones, and multicolored works. The first category includes white trees created between 2003 and 2011, the installation Thank You Silence from 2005, the group of sculptures entitled Poem (2006–2007), paintings of starry skies produced between 2008 and 2012, the Moonrise family of masks (2003–2005) or the "spectral" installation Thanx 4 Nothing from 2015.

In the more grayish, earthy and mineral tones: the clouds from 2008 and their diary; the nudes from 2010–2011, the birds from 2011; the horses from 2013–2014; the fish from 2016, and a large family of "archaic" and "atemporal" sculptures in bluestone created from 2013 on. As for color, it never ceases to permeate the artist's works and exhibition presentations, regularly subjecting families of works initially produced in "neutral" tones to a wider chromatic spectrum.

One example is the wax-molded sculpture of a nude woman shown in 2021 at the Kamel Mennour gallery in Paris, in which the polychrome character of the nude was echoed in the space in which it was displayed, irradiating both the work and its setting. In conclusion, one can cite, in the context of Rondinone's trajectory in general and in his polychrome works in particular, the Families of Mountains (2015–2018) and Nuns + Monks (2020).

The mountains constitute colorful, abstract alternatives to the figurative bluestone sculptures, while the Nuns + Monks (2020), which encapsulate the spiritual questions Rondinone raises in his work, perfectly combine many of the "contradictory" vectors that characterize it. Made in painted bronze, these sculptures were first conceived in the form of limestone models, allowing the artist to combine within the same proposition an origin from the mineral world and a chromatic treatment that is extremely artificial. In them, nature and culture converge. And the circle, a shape that has become iconic in Rondinone’s aesthetic, comes back around.

==== Commissions ====
Although he regularly exhibits in galleries, Rondinone may be most widely known for monumental public artworks such as Human Nature (2014), nine, colossal towers of stacked bluestone boulders that were characterized as an urban Stonehenge during their 2013 exhibition at Rockefeller Center in New York City, where they attracted an estimated fifteen million viewers.

An equal number have experienced Seven Magic Mountains, an installation of stone pillars painted in rich, vibrant colors that Rondinone set in the Nevada desert outside of Las Vegas, and co-presented by the Art Production Fund and the Nevada Museum of Art.

His series of rainbow-colored rooftop arches, painted with such slogans as “Hell NO!” (New Museum, New York) and “Breathe, Walk, Die” (Rockbund Museum, Shanghai), is ongoing. In 2018, Tate Liverpool commissioned Liverpool Mountain (2018), an outdoor "mountain" sculpture as a permanent installation in the building's courtyard.

=== Other projects ===
==== Seven Magic Mountains (2016–23) ====
Seven Magic Mountains, commissioned, produced and financed by the Art Production Fund (APF) and the Nevada Museum of Art, followed Rondinone's work Human Nature, a Public Art Fund project of monumental, stone stick-figures arranged in the highly man-made environment of Rockefeller Center in Manhattan—and depicts the opposite: highly artificial neon totems set in the natural environment.

A similar sculpture, the 35-foot Miami Mountain, built in 2015, was located outside the Bass Art Museum in Collins Park, Miami Beach, Florida, as of December 2021.

==== Real estate projects ====
Rondinone's first address in New York City was a former Lower East Side ballroom at 2nd Street and Avenue B, where he lived and worked until 2003, when he bought a loft on Broadway in the East Village.

In 2007, he acquired a studio loft on the ground floor of 39 Great Jones Street. Today, it is the Presenhuber Gallery's satellite in New York, but Rondinone maintains an exhibition program for new work by other artists in its display window.

In 2011, he acquired the 20,000 sq ft (1,900 m^{2}) former, deconsecrated Mount Moriah Baptist Church at 2050 Fifth Avenue in Harlem for $2.8 million. Rondinone’s ex-wife, Presenhuber, pays rent on one of the two apartments, complete with its own dedicated staircase and kitchen, within his Harlem home.

In 2005, the artist and Giorno bought a summer house in Barryville, New York, near the Delaware Water Gap, where New York, Pennsylvania and New Jersey come together. The landscape led directly to two new bodies of work. His first stone sculptures were made from rocks he picked from walls of the sort his father had built in Matera. A nearby quarry led to the monumental bluestone sculptures he made for a public art installation in Rockefeller Center, Human Nature, in 2013.

Since 2014, he has been operating a second studio at his holiday home in Mattituck, Long Island, where he collects driftwood to create sculptures of ships. He also owns a property in Matera, Italy.

In 2014, Rondinone completed construction on House no. 1, a project the artist envisioned as a livable Gesamtkunstwerk, built in a forest clearing near the small town of Würenlos, near Zürich. It was built alongside architects Andreas Fuhrimann and Gabrielle Hächler and represents an amalgamation of stylistic influences, showing Japanese influences as well as elements of European Art and Crafts style. The interior contains direct references to Rondinone's art; the fireplace is a "functioning replica" of STILL.LIFE. (JOHNS FIREPLACE), a life-size Rondinone work from 2008 made in cast bronze, lead, and paint. The house was sold to Georgian fashion designer Demna Gvasalia, creative director of Balenciaga and founder of Vetements.

==== Curatorial work ====
Rondinone made his curatorial debut in 2007 for the exhibition The Third Mind at the Palais de Tokyo, Paris, for which Rondinone was given a "carte blanche" to conceive of the show, which was staged in honor of Giorno's 70th birthday. This exhibition showed works from the 1960s to the early 2000s, and Rondinone received positive critical reception for his curation.

Five years later in 2012, Rondinone curated The Spirit Level at Gladstone Gallery, New York, this time to celebrate Giorno's 75th birthday. Taking place concurrently at both Gladstone Gallery branches in New York, the show included works by eighteen "disparate" artists, "a generational and geographical range from contemporary New Yorkers to little-known Europeans".

Rondinone borrowed his own practice of creating enclosed environments for this show, painting the gallery doors to eliminate influence in the form of light or distraction from the outside. Karen Rosenberg praised the show in her review for The New York Times, writing: "Altogether, though, 'The Spirit Level' is a garden of very unearthly delights and an excellent argument for extending the life cycle of the artist-organized group show."

In his third curatorial endeavor, Rondinone put together Artists and Poets at Wiener Secession, Vienna in 2015. Giorno is the only poet represented in the show; rather, the title comes from Rondinone's conviction that art and poetry are interconnected.

That same year, he curated Ugo Rondinone: I Heart John Giorno, returning to the Palais de Tokyo. Rondinone spent four years curating this exhibition, which contained works by and about Giorno. This included Andy Warhol's 1964 underground film Sleep, a film of Giorno sleeping, and another called John Washing Dishes.

Rondinone included his own work, a life-size bronze cast of Giorno's fireplace from 2007, as well as a portrait of Giorno done by Elizabeth Peyton. Laura Hoptman, a curator at the Museum of Modern Art and a friend of both Rondinone and Giorno, said about the exhibition: "As much as the show exhibits the remarkable dedication that Ugo has to John's extraordinary career, John's decision to give Ugo his lifetime of work – his oeuvre entire – to make an installation is an act of love that I believe has no precedent, at least in recent art history," Ms. Hoptman wrote in an email. "It's the stuff of myth. Or at least an O. Henry story."

Ugo Rondinone: I ♥︎ John Giorno was an extension of Rondinone’s 2015 Palais de Tokyo show, consisting of eighteen "chapters" held in thirteen venues around Manhattan in 2017: "Every chapter takes the form of an immersive installation designed by Rondinone and dedicated to a body of work, an interest, a relationship or a collaboration that has marked Giorno's life." A special edition of The Brooklyn Rail was produced for the exhibition and served as the exhibition catalogue.

==== Art collection ====
Rondinone owns an extensive art collection with at least two hundred pieces. This includes a large pink phallus from Sarah Lucas's Penetralia series (2008), which is on display in the living room in Rondinone's renovated Harlem church. Rondinone included works from Lucas's Penetralia series in The Spirit Level at Gladstone Gallery in 2012. Rondinone's bathroom in his Harlem home contains a stained-glass wall done by his fellow Swiss artist Urs Fischer.

== Exhibitions ==
Rondinone's debut in exhibition was in a 1985 group show at Galerie Marlene Frei, Zurich. Rondinone made a significant debut in 1989 at WEIHNACHTSAUSSTELLUNG, the "Christmas Exhibition" in Lucerne. This multi-artist show included three of Rondinone's landscape paintings, one of his most recognizable and intricate bodies of work. Rondinone had painted his first of these large-format landscape paintings in February of this same year, a series which would ultimately include 103 paintings. These landscapes are done in India ink, painted by Rondinone's own hand with a small Chinese brush. Rondinone's landscapes are not painted from life; rather, "the artist compiles his forest fantasies from individual motifs borrowed mainly from 18th-century works, though without concretely disclosing his image sources". Rondinone makes no attempt to represent a mimetic vision of nature, but instead compiles images and motifs that fit a certain mood. In the decades since their debut, Rondinone's landscape paintings have proven to be an enduring and extolled body of work in the artist's oeuvre.

Since this 1989 initiation, Rondinone has staged at least one exhibition, often many more, in different parts of the world each year. Also in 1989, the same year of Rondinone's emergence into the art scene, Presenhuber accepted the directorship of the nonprofit Galerie Walcheturm in Zurich, provided she could also run her own program in a project space.

In 1991, she presented Rondinone's landscape drawings to date in a show titled, I'm a Tree. Following this exhibition, Presenhuber has continued to show Rondinone's work in Europe and New York. In 1995, Presenhuber again showed Rondinone's work at Galerie Walcheturm with the exhibition Cry Me a River, which was Rondinone's first exhibition of sculptural self-portrait. This installation is essential to understanding Rondinone's larger oeuvre because it functions as a foil to his usual method of artistic manipulation. Rondinone is known to create “worlds” in his installations which block out the exterior, often by boarding up windows, covering windows and doors in translucent colored film, or by other means to create a self-contained installation which contains no influence from the outside; this work does the opposite, forcing both those inside and those outside to engage with the other, and framing those on either side as participants in the work. A stuffed dummy resembling the artist sat slumped against the wall of the exhibition space, visible to passersby through a large plate glass window. The title of the exhibition was later borrowed for his 1997 work Cry Me a River, the first of his neon signs, and an example of Rondinone's frequent repurposing of titles across exhibitions, works, and poems.

In 2007, he represented Switzerland in the 52nd Venice Biennial, alongside Urs Fischer. For this occasion, Rondinone produced a series of his signature cast olive trees, fabricated in aluminum and white enamel: AIR GETS INTO EVERYTHING EVEN NOTHING (2006); WISDOM? PEACE? BLANK? ALL OF THIS? (2007); and GET UP GIRL A SUN IS RUNNING THE WORLD (2006). GET UP GIRL A SUN IS RUNNING THE WORLD (2006) was previously shown as part of Rondinone's November 2006 collaborative project with Creative Time's Art on the Plaza in the Ritz Carlton Plaza, Battery Park, New York. In accordance with Italian law, these casts are done on-site in Rondinone's parents' hometown of Matera with rubber, and only later in the studio they are transformed through wax and then take their final aluminum form. air gets into everything even nothing (2006) was part of this Rockefeller Center installation and is now part of the Des Moines Art Center permanent collections. New York City and Des Moines represent starkly different urban environments, and in each, air gets into everything even nothing asks questions about "time, displacement, and the relationship between natural and artificial environment".

Rondinone’s neon sculpture Hell, Yes! (2001) was installed on the New Museum's façade from its opening in 2007 through 2010.

Cast sculptures of the organic world appear throughout Rondinone's career and particularly in his still.life series, a variety of ephemeral objects cast in bronze to render them permanent. In his 2012 exhibition Lifelike at the New Orleans Museum of Art, Rondinone showed the first work in this series, STILL.LIFE. (FOLDED CARDBOARD) (2007), made to look like a piece of folded cardboard resting on the ground and propped up against the wall. Thank you Silence at M Museum, Leuven in 2012 exemplified Rondinone's interest in these preserved forms; there, the artist displayed primitive (2011–2012), fifty-nine cast-bronze birds. The birds were each hand-sculpted by the artist; his visible fingerprints on the final pieces are evidence of this. Rondinone limited himself to creating one bird each day: “This imposition of a time constraint helped the artist to achieve a naive and childlike quality in the modeling of the bird.”

The works in nuns + monks are a series from 2019 and 2020 of two-tone painted-bronze sculptures which are made from casts of limestones. The construction of these figures from limestone is aligned with the artist's preceding works, but Rondinone's inspiration came also from early 20th-century Italian sculpture: "It should be explained that the creation of these works was nourished by Rondinone's assiduous frequentation of the medieval sculpture department at the Metropolitan Museum in New York, and in addition by a powerful confrontation with Giacomo Manzù's Cardinals, whose own particular modernity, permeated by a classicism that defies time and categorization, inevitably corresponded to his interest."

Rondinone has staged solo exhibitions at major institutions across the world, including Kunstmuseum Luzern (2024); Palais de Tokyo, Paris (2018); Fundación Casa Wabi, Oaxaca (2018); Berkeley Art Museum and Pacific Film Archive, Berkeley, California (2017); Garage, Moscow (2017); The Bass Museum, Miami (2016); Place Vendôme, Paris (2016); Mercati di Traiano, Rome (2016); Rockbund Art Museum, Shanghai (2014); Art Institute of Chicago (2013); Nasher Sculpture Center, Dallas (2013); M Museum, Leuven, Belgium (2013); Cycladic Art Museum, Athens (2012); New Orleans Museum of Art (2012); Aargauer Kunsthaus, Aarau, Switzerland (2010); Le Consortium, Dijon (2004); Australian Centre for Contemporary Art, Melbourne (2004); Museum of Contemporary Art Sydney (2003); Centre Georges Pompidou, Paris (2003); Kunsthalle Wien, Vienna (2002); and Centre d'Art Contemporain, Geneva (1996).

=== Art fairs ===
Elftermarzzweitausendundzwolf (2015) was shown at Art Basel Miami in 2015; Business Insider included the work in its compilation of "The most outrageous works of art we saw at Art Basel" and said the piece was "perfect for selfies:" "The brightly colored bricks are painted larger than life—like a stage set seen too close for an illusion of realism to take effect. They're primitive, even though nothing is more modern than a freestanding feature wall."

== Art market ==
Rondinone's highest price at auction came from his 2009 A DAY LIKE THIS.MADE OF NOTHING AND NOTHING ELSE sold at Sotheby's in November 2018 for $1,131,000. The piece was previously owned by patron, collector, and museum trustee David Teiger, who installed the nearly seventeen-feet-tall and nineteen-feet-wide cast-aluminum and white enamel sculpture on the front lawn of his home in New Jersey. The work was sold as part of The History of Now: The Collection of David Teiger Sold to Benefit Teiger Foundation for the Support of Contemporary Art.

The sale of A DAY LIKE THIS.MADE OF NOTHING AND NOTHING ELSE exceeded Rondinone’s previous record for a work sold at auction, which had been held by his 2006 Get up girl a sun is running the world sold through Phillips de Pury & Company in June 2011 for $864,340, also an olive tree cast in aluminum and white enamel. This work had previously been exhibited in the Church of San Stae, Venice, as part of the Swiss Pavilion at the 52nd Venice Biennale alongside works by Urs Fischer.

Rondinone is represented by Esther Schipper, Galerie Eva Presenhuber (Zurich, New York), Sadie Coles HQ (London), Galerie Kamel Mennour (Paris), Kukje Gallery (Seoul), Krobath (Vienna), and Gladstone Gallery (New York, Brussels). His work resides in numerous public and private collections, including the Centre Georges Pompidou (Paris), the Albertina Museum (Vienna), the Israel Museum (Jerusalem), the Dallas Museum of Art, the Carnegie Museum of Art (Pittsburgh, Pennsylvania), the Kunsthaus Zürich, and the Art Gallery of New South Wales (Sydney, Australia).

== Other activities ==
- Public Art Fund, member of the board (since 2014)
- John Giorno Foundation, president

== Personal life ==
Rondinone's long-time partner during the later part of his life was poet and activist John Giorno. In 2017, Rondinone mounted an exhibition called I ♥ John Giorno across thirteen Manhattan venues. An exhibition which he called an expanded love letter to Giorno. The pair met in 1997 when Rondinone asked Giorno to take part in one of his exhibitions.

In 2017, Rondinone was diagnosed with high-grade bladder cancer. In September 2019, the artist organized an auction at Sotheby's New York called Stop Blood Cancer. Rondinone and fourteen other artists donated their work to the auction, whose proceeds went to bladder cancer treatment research at Cornell University's Weill Medical College, where Rondinone's own oncologist is working to develop treatment for this disease.

== Selected bibliography ==
- Laura Hoptman, Erik Verhagen, Nicholas Baume, Ugo Rondinone, Phaidon, London, 2022.
- Lionel Bovier, Morgan Falconer, Ugo Rondinone: Pure Sunshine, JRP | Ringier, 2018.
- Iwona Blazwick, Alison Gingeras, Ugo Rondinone: Zero Built a Nest in My Navel, JRP | Ringier, 2015.
- Agustín Pérez Rubio, Madeleine Schuppli, Ugo Rondinone: The Night of Lead, JRP | Ringier, 2010.

== See also ==
- Cadillac Ranch
- Carhenge
- Prada Marfa
- Site-specific art
