= Eva Presenhuber =

Austrian-Swiss arts dealer

- Born: Austria
- Occupation: Art dealer

Eva Presenhuber is an Austrian-Swiss art dealer. She is the owner of Galerie Eva Presenhuber, an international contemporary art gallery with spaces in Zürich, Switzerland, and Vienna, Austria.

== Career ==
=== Early beginnings ===
In 1989, Presenhuber became director of Galerie Walcheturm, a non-profit exhibition space in Zürich, which she transformed into a respected program showcasing Swiss artists such as Fischli Weiss and Ugo Rondinone. Presenhuber also gave international artists such as Sue Williams, Douglas Gordon, and Angela Bulloch their first gallery exhibitions in Switzerland.

In 1996, Presenhuber founded LISTE art fair alongside Peter Kilchmann and Peter Bläuer, as she felt Basel needed a younger fair to run parallel to Art Basel.

=== Galerie Eva Presenhuber, 2003–present ===
After a five year long partnership with Hauser & Wirth, Presenhuber founded her own company, Galerie Eva Presenhuber, which opened with a Verne Dawson exhibition in October 2003.

After several years exhibiting in the Löwenbräu Areal, Presenhuber opened a secondary space in the Diagonal building at the former Maag Areal. The new gallery – designed by Andreas Fuhrimann and Gabrielle Hächler architects – opened with a major exhibition by Austrian artist Franz West in April 2011, and was Presenhuber's only Zürich location from late 2017 to early 2020.

In 2014, The Guardian named her in their "Movers and makers: the most powerful people in the art world". Presenhuber has a reputation for museum-calibre exhibitions and art fair booths.

In Spring 2017, Presenhuber opened an exhibition space in New York, with an inaugural show by Austrian painter Tobias Pils.

In June 2020, Eva Presenhuber opened a second location in Zurich at Waldmannstrasse 6.

In April 2022, Eva Presenhuber expanded further by opening a gallery in Vienna.

The gallery presents artists including Doug Aitken, Joe Bradley, Carroll Dunham, John Giorno and Wyatt Kahn.

== Other activities ==
Presenhuber has served on the selection committees of Liste, Art Basel and Frieze Art Fair.
