= Cady Noland =

American artist (born 1956)

- Born: 1956 (age 69–70); Washington, D.C., US
- Education: Sarah Lawrence College
- Known for: Sculpture; installation art
- Notable work: Oozewald (1989); The Big Slide (1989); This Piece Has No Title Yet (1989); Publyck Sculpture (1994)

Cady Noland (born 1956) is an American sculptor, printmaker, and installation artist who primarily works with found objects and appropriated images. Her work, often made with objects denoting danger, industry, and American patriotism, addresses notions including the failed promise of the American Dream, the divide between fame and anonymity, and violence in American society. Many of her works have involved different kinds of physical barriers in gallery spaces, including fences, barricades, and metal poles to guide or restrict the audience's movements. She has drawn extensively on media and tabloid imagery, regularly using images of notable criminals, celebrities, and public figures involved in scandal. Art critic Peter Schjeldahl called Noland "a dark poet of the national unconscious."

Noland has participated in several high profile exhibitions, including the 44th Venice Biennale (1990), the Whitney Biennial (1991), and Documenta 9 (1992). After widely exhibiting her art in the 1980s and 1990s to broad acclaim, Noland largely stopped presenting her work for nearly two decades. She began exhibiting again in the late 2010s, staging a museum retrospective in 2018 and exhibitions of new work in the early 2020s. Critics have written extensively about her influence on contemporary art beginning in the 1990s, in particular the seeming visual randomness of her often-sprawling installations that has been broadly emulated by other artists.

She is also known for her numerous disputes and lawsuits with museums, galleries, and collectors over their handling of her work. Noland was the subject of several legal disputes with collectors in the 2010s after she disavowed artworks that she no longer considered genuine due to damage or restoration. On several occasions she has requested the removal of her work from group exhibitions, and she has required art dealers and gallerists to post disclaimers at unauthorized exhibitions to inform audiences that she did not agree to participate. She has also been noted for her reluctance to be publicly identified, having only ever allowed two photographs of herself to be publicly released.

== Early life and education ==
Cady Noland was born in 1956 in Washington, D.C., the daughter of Kenneth Noland and Cornelia Langer.

Kenneth was a well-known abstract painter, and Langer, also an artist, co-owned a boutique in Alexandria, Virginia. They divorced in 1957. Her father Kenneth moved to New York City and lived in the Chelsea Hotel before buying a property in Shaftsbury, Vermont, and her mother eventually remarried to Dr. Donald J. Reis in 1985. At the encouragement of art critic Clement Greenberg, her father became an active member of the Sullivanian psychotherapy cult run by Saul B. Newton, which encouraged participants to discard their familial relations; (Note: Kenneth Noland's relationship with the Sullivanian cult has been detailed by critic Robert Hughes and author Alexander Stille.) Langer was later photographed for an article in The New York Times about a custody trial related to the cult and was identified with two other women as "relatives of Sullivanian collective members".

Author Nick Stillman has written that Noland grew up in New York, but it is unclear when she moved to the city or with which parent she lived; she sometimes spent time as a child at her father's property in Vermont. As an adult she said she "came from" Washington, D.C., calling it "a city of façade" and adding, "What's behind it? We're two-faced!" She has also said that growing up around her father's practice helped her to understand the machinations of the art world from an early age: "Dealers were already demystified for me."

Noland attended Sarah Lawrence College, Langer's alma mater, and lived in Manhattan after graduation. While in college she studied under sociology professor Stephen N. Butler, whom she would later dedicate a book to.

== Life and career ==
=== 1980-1987: Career beginnings ===
Noland first exhibited her art in 1981 at the nonprofit Washington Square East Galleries in a group exhibition juried by art historian and critic Marcia Tucker. She then began making artworks with found objects in 1983. Among her earliest works was Total Institution (1984), a multimedia assemblage sculpture created with items including a phone receiver, toilet seat, and rubber chicken hanging from a rack on a wall. Noland exhibited several found object artworks at Peter Nagy's gallery Nature Morte in 1987. She presented Shuttle, an assemblage work featuring shiny car parts placed on an extremely old, rusted wheeled cart. The cart was attached to a railing installed on the wall, creating a kind of track that the cart could not escape. Additionally, she exhibited Mirror Device, a small wall-based mirror work featuring a bright orange flare gun and handcuffs hanging from a horizontal metal bar attached to the front of the mirror. Noland met artist Steven Parrino at an opening for an exhibition at the gallery, and the two became friends and colleagues.

Also, in 1987, Noland created a slide lecture titled "Towards a Metalanguage of Evil" which she presented at an academic conference in Atlanta. The lecture explored Noland's research into psychopathology, with a focus on what she saw as the violence and exploitative behaviors of successful American men.

=== 1988-1989: Rise to prominence ===
In 1988, Noland attended an open house for artists at the nonprofit gallery White Columns where she showed Polaroid images of her art to the director of the gallery, Bill Arning. Arning later said the images confused and "fascinated" him, as the installations in the pictures did not seem like traditional artworks, but rather collections of objects: "I couldn't tell where the art was." After visiting Noland's studio, Arning invited her to present her first solo exhibition in a gallery at White Columns. Noland spent so long finalizing the works in the gallery that Arning gave her the keys to lock up when he went home for the night.

Noland's exhibition at White Columns, White Room: Cady Noland, opened in March 1988. Works in the exhibition were made with medical equipment like IV bags and walkers and industrial materials like rubber mats and jumper cables, along with a silk screen depiction of a pistol. She also installed a metal bar across the door, forcing visitors to duck to enter. Journalist Julia Halperin has described the exhibition as "a cross between a Social Security office, a police station and a hospital." Arning said that when he first saw Noland's installation, he immediately called patrons of the gallery to tell them "Look, something really important happened here, and I think you need to see it." Noland's exhibition was critically acclaimed and she was soon invited to participate in several high-profile exhibitions in the United States and internationally. In November 1988, Noland staged her first solo exhibition outside the United States, at Galerie Westersingel 8 in Rotterdam, which featured mixed media mirrored constructions. Noland's exhibition was part of a series of shows by New York-based artists staged in conjunction with Rotterdam's 1988 cultural festival.

Our American Cousin (1989) at Glenstone

Noland exhibited solo at Colin de Land's American Fine Arts Co. gallery in April 1989, presenting multiple works focusing on the assassination of Abraham Lincoln. She silk screened historical images of Lincoln's boots, the suit he was wearing when he was shot, and the bloody cot he died on, along with snippets of text from a minute-by-minute news report of the assassination, onto metal panels that she leaned against the wall. She also exhibited several found object installations, including Our American Cousin, a pen-like metal enclosure in the center of the gallery filled with empty beer cans, stacked walkers, handcuffs, a barbecue grill, license plates, and hamburger buns. The work was titled after the play Lincoln had been viewing the night he was assassinated. Other installations she showed at the exhibition included: Celebrity Trash Spill, a work displayed on the floor in a pile featuring broken cameras, sunglasses, a metallic shirt, rubber floor mats, and a copy of the New York Post with the headline "Abbie Hoffman Dead;" and The American Trip, an assemblage sculpture featuring an American flag paired with a variant of the Jolly Roger. Additionally, Noland used metal bars installed around the space to block access to certain areas, including bars situated around the gallery reception desk, bars blocking the entry to the gallery owner's office, and bars surrounding the owner's desk. Reviewing the exhibition for Arts Magazine, critic Gretchen Faust called Our American Cousin the "centerpiece" of the show, adding that the piece "capture[s] the flavor, really the essence, of a Chevy truck commercial." Critic Jan Avgikos described Our American Cousin as a "whitetrash déjeuner sur l'herbe." Multiple critics identified chromed or shiny metal as a central visual motif in Noland's work. (Note: Identified in reviews by Roberta Smith, Daniela Salvioni, and Lisa Liebmann.)

This Piece Has No Title Yet (1989) at the Rubell Museum

In October 1989, Noland staged a solo exhibition at the Mattress Factory in Pittsburgh, where she installed This Piece Has No Title Yet. One of Noland's best-known works, the piece is a room-sized installation composed of over 1000 six-packs of Budweiser beer stacked behind metal scaffolding with American flags, handcuffs, and other detritus scattered around the room. The museum borrowed the beer from a local distributor and had to dismantle and rebuild the installation three times over the course of the show to return the beer so it could be sold before it expired. Noland said that Budweiser cans "serve as a kind of 'flag manqué'" in her art because of their similarity in color to American flags, and she described the cans as "tiny units of mastery" for their visual representation of mass production, commodification, and consumption. John Caldwell, a curator at the Carnegie Museum of Art, called the work "jaw-dropping" and tried unsuccessfully to convince local collectors in Pittsburgh to buy it. It was instead purchased by New York-based collector Elaine Dannheisser. Curator and dealer Jeffrey Deitch later called the work Noland's "masterpiece, her greatest work."

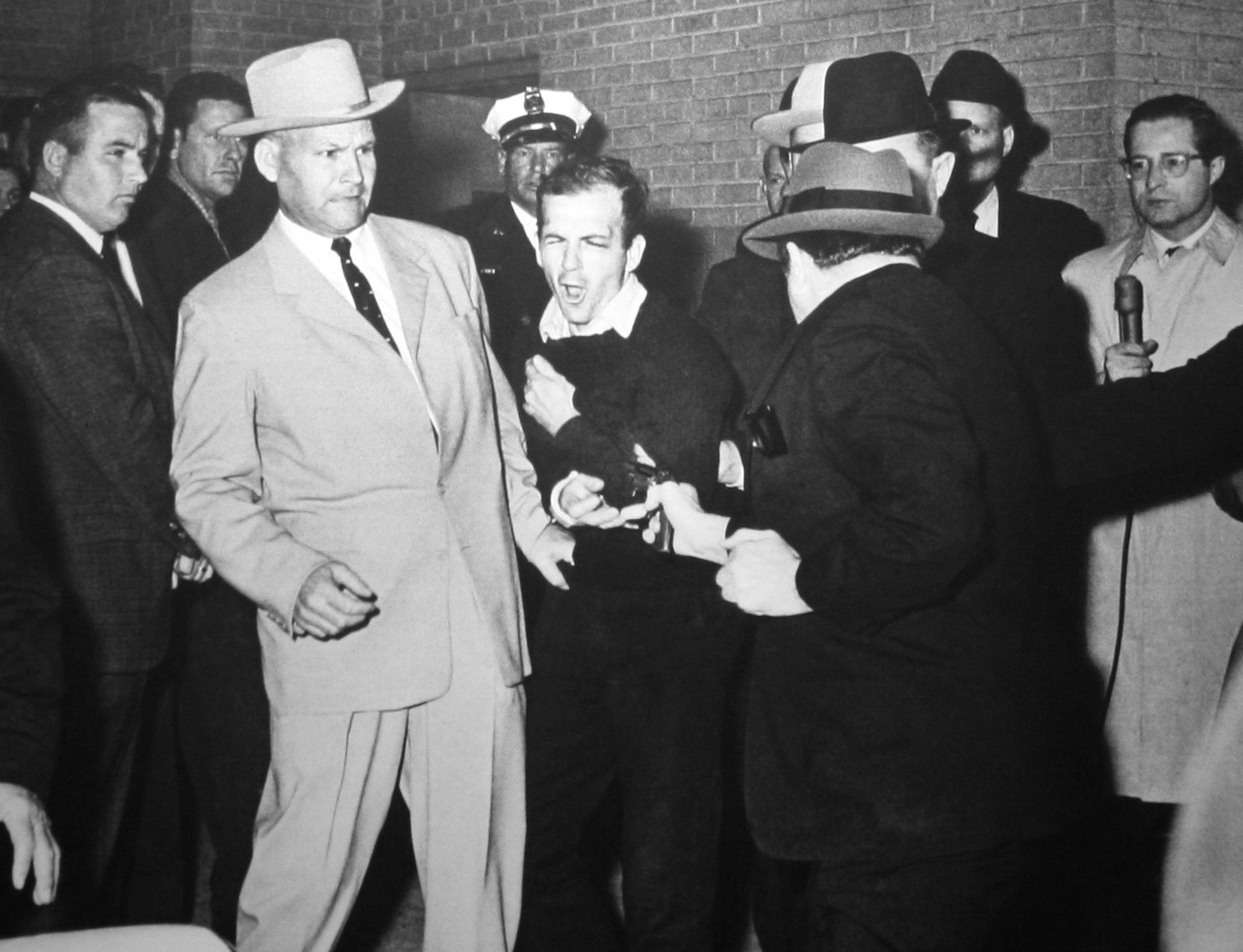
From top: Oozewald (1989) at Glenstone; and the source image Noland used for the work, taken by Robert H. Jackson in 1963.

Noland then mounted a solo show at Galleria Massimo De Carlo in Milan, in December 1989, where she almost completely filled the gallery with objects strewn across the floor and installed on the walls – including beer cans, walkers, bungee cords, metal clips, a flipper and snorkel, a revolver, flags, potato chips, and a gas mask. The largest work in the show, Deep Social Space, consisted of beer cans, an American flag, saddles and horse blankets, a barbecue grill, a rural USPS mailbox, a crutch, dish towels and an apron, hamburger buns, and containers of motor oil and Quaker oats, among other objects, all stacked and arranged among and between two parallel sets of metal bars and barriers. She also installed a large number of silk screened works, many of which comprised metal panels with media images and reports from the life and travails of kidnapping victim and heiress Patty Hearst, including pictures of Hearst in a cheerleading uniform, Hearst on a hunting trip with her boyfriend, and Hearst wielding a gun with members of the Symbionese Liberation Army. Noland also debuted Oozewald, a silk screened metal cut-out work featuring an image of Lee Harvey Oswald – John F. Kennedy's assassin – being assassinated himself; Noland cut several circular holes in the cut-out, including one over Oswald's mouth, into which she stuffed an American flag. In addition, Noland again installed metal bars and gates throughout the gallery which forced viewers to follow certain paths and blocked them from entering spaces.

The same year, Noland published an illustrated essay version of "Towards a Metalanguage of Evil" in the fourth issue of the little known Spanish magazine Balcon. The essay was accompanied by illustrations of works by artists including Sherrie Levine, Barbara Kruger, Nagy, and Parrino, along with stock photographs of car crashes and other transportation accidents. She later called the essay a critique of "a model of the entrepreneurial male whose goals excuse any and all sorts of egregious behavior if those goals are met with success".

Speaking to filmmaker John Waters and art historian Bruce Hainley in 2003, Noland said that an unnamed art dealer had censored her work in the late 1980s. For a group exhibition, Noland installed a metal pole across a doorway with a small American flag that had been cut at an angle hanging from the pole. Noland told Waters and Hainley that the unnamed gallerist had "rushed at me screaming and hyperventilating, 'I took that piece down. The other ones are still there...CAN'T attract the IRS...collectors offended...not THAT, Cady...they are right...right.'" She also relayed a story of the same gallery owner censoring the title of a work by Parrino, and curator Bob Nickas later confirmed that the unnamed dealer was John Gibson.

=== 1990-1992: International acclaim ===
Deep Social Space (1989) at the Museum Brandhorst. The installation was exhibited at the 44th Venice Biennale in 1990.

Noland's work was included in the 44th Venice Biennale in May 1990, in the exhibition's Aperto section. Noland exhibited Deep Social Space, a sprawling found object installation she debuted in Milan, in 1989. She also installed several silk screened works featuring images of Oswald and Hearst, commercial advertising images of cowboys, and a photograph of a nineteenth-century prostitute's dwelling in the Pacific Northwest. Critic Peter Schjeldahl, reviewing the exhibition for Mirabella, said that the "effect of the ensemble is drastically melancholic; a cumulative charge of forlorn facts that affect a viewer like personal memories of childhood unhappiness." Discussing Noland's work as among the most popular in the exhibition, critic Amei Wallach, writing in Newsday, said collectors were "hot on [her] tracks..."

In July 1990, Noland staged New West-Old West, a solo show at Luhring Augustine Gallery and Galerie Max Hetzler's joint gallery location in Los Angeles. Works in the exhibition included a large wooden log cabin facade, a large staircase leading to a wall, an antique western chuckwagon, cut-out images of cowboys, silk screened metal panels with images of Mary Todd Lincoln and texts about the history of Colt guns, along with found objects on the floor of the gallery including raw lumber, a trash-filled dustpan, empty beer cans, rubber chickens, animal hides, and flags. One room of the exhibition included works Noland created in collaboration with graphic designers, consisting of commercial-seeming slogans and imagery for imagined products or companies with tag-lines like "Loans My Ass", displayed along with a barroom door, a bubble-wrapped car bumper, tools, and a cow's skull. In addition, Noland asked the gallery staff to wear stereotypical American frontier outfits like chaps, holsters, and cowboy hats that she rented for the duration of the exhibition, and staff were made to answer the phone by saying "howdy." Noland said that the outfits "functioned as a kind of alternative or additional performance laid over the roles already being performed" by the staff in their day-to-day work, adding that "It was a very difficult month for them but they were really good sports." Reviewing the exhibition for the Los Angeles Times, critic Kristine McKenna said Noland's show was "a wild ride through the junked landscape of America," and that it "suggests that our collective mind is like a hamster cage, padded with a thick, comforting layer of trash." Several critics writing contemporaneously panned the show overall, including McKenna, who wrote that "on close examination [the exhibition] loses intensity and focus in its attempt to do too much," and Lawrence Gipe, writing in Flash Art, who said that "Although many of the essential elements for social satire are present, their effectiveness is smothered by the familiarity of Noland's attack." Writing in retrospect several decades later, however, journalist Andrew Russeth described the show as "one of her most fondly remembered," and Halperin labeled the show "celebrated."

Collectors were only approved to purchase her work from her solo exhibition in Los Angeles if they agreed to sign a contract stipulating that Noland would be involved with any future sale of the work; gallery co-owner Lawrence Luhring later said that Noland was "very cautious" in dealing with the art market. In 1992 Noland developed a similar contract that required any owners of a work to donate 15% of sale profits to a homelessness prevention nonprofit if the work were ever resold, which she used when selling several print works to collectors.

In August 1990, Noland participated in curator Ralph Rugoff's group exhibition Just Pathetic at Rosamund Felsen Gallery in Los Angeles, which sought to define the stylistic movement Rugoff had termed "pathetic art." Noland exhibited several assemblage works from the previous five years, including Pedestal (1985), a combination of a rubber mat, belt, and deflated soccer ball arranged to look like a potted plant, along with Chicken in a Basket (1989), a shopping basket filled with a rubber chicken, bungee cord, beer cans, and a crumpled American flag beneath the pile of objects. Critic Christopher Knight, writing in the Los Angeles Times, called the latter work one of the "most affecting pieces" in the exhibition, describing it as "suggesting the morning-after clean-up following a particularly unspeakable party."

In 1991 Noland participated in the Whitney Biennial, installing This Piece Has No Title Yet in a corner on the top floor of the exhibition. She also installed several of her silk screen works featuring images of Oswald and Hearst. Noland's installation in the Biennial was critically divisive, with some hailing her as a star of the exhibition and others panning her work completely. (Note: Critics that positively reviewed the installation at the Whitney included Christopher Knight in the Los Angeles Times, Michael Kimmelman in The New York Times, Ken Johnson in Art in America, and Susan Canning in Art Papers; while the installation was negatively reviewed by Thomas McEvilley in Artforum, Louisa Buck in Women's Art Magazine, and critic Arthur Danto.)

In February 1992, Noland exhibited a site-specific installation at the Museum of Contemporary Art, Los Angeles (MOCA), which included several works created for the museum's space that Noland gifted to MOCA. As part of the installation, she used push-pins to attach Xerox copies of blurry images to the gallery walls, placed paint buckets and installation hardware around the room, and put aluminum scaffolding on the floor in a corner hidden behind a length of corrugated sheet metal. She also installed several chain-link fences and steel blockades and works featuring Oswald and Hearst, in addition to leaving scuff marks and drill holes on the walls of the gallery.

View of Noland's installation "Towards a Metalanguage of Evil" at Documenta 9 in 1992, featuring several passages from her essay of the same name.

Noland was selected to exhibit at Documenta 9 in June 1992 in Kassel. She presented a three-dimensional version of her essay "Towards a Metalanguage of Evil," featuring passages of the text silk screened onto boards placed haphazardly on the ground and leaning against walls in an underground parking garage. She added an addendum to the essay for this version titled "The Bonsai Effect" that laid out her criticism of American excess and waste. Noland also installed artworks by artists featured in the illustrated version of the essay, and surrounded the installation with cinder blocks, oil, a Camaro, and a van turned on its side with smashed windows. Denys Zacharopoulos, a co-director of that year's Documenta exhibition, said Noland had been selected for the show because of "the clear position with which the artist transformed a possible group show into a collective single work." Zacharopoulos also described Noland's choice to install her show in a parking garage as "quite shocking at the time," labelling the space "a threatening, empty cavity." Knight, again writing in the Los Angeles Times, called Noland's installation "the show's succes d'estime." Speaking a decade later about her experience participating in Documenta, Noland said that it had been "psychically amazing, but it tests your character to have to account not only for what you do in the studio but for what your work means in the world," adding that "the international spotlight that Documenta shines on artists [...] can be overwhelming."

=== 1993-1999: Return to New York, museum exhibitions ===
In 1993 Noland staged a two-artist exhibition with Doug MacWithey at the Dallas Museum of Art. Noland produced several silk screen works printed on reflective metallic surfaces that she called "funhouse mirrors," and she directed the museum to make four wheelchairs available in the galleries for all visitors, which were themselves made with a reflective metal similar to many of Noland's artworks. Noland later said in an interview that "I get impatient and lazy looking at art myself," and added that "The wheelchairs allowed you to move if you wanted to, you were not trapped." Also in 1993 she began producing large silk screen works on aluminum depicting red brick walls.

For a solo exhibition in 1994 at Paula Cooper Gallery in New York, her first show in the city since 1989, Noland produced four sculptures which appear like combinations between a pillory and stocks. The sculptures were interactive and she allowed viewers to lock themselves in. Noland has said that she believes stocks, often situated in town squares, were the first form of public sculpture in colonial America. These works were first inspired by a work-in-progress by Parrino titled Stockade: Existential Trap for Speed Freaks; Parrino said that "Cady called me to ask if it was okay to make stockade pieces. I told her she didn't need my permission." In addition to the stocks sculptures, Noland presented Publyck Sculpture, a set of aluminum-covered wooden beams with three tires hanging down from chains like a swing set, which was inspired by a similar-looking tire swing found in cult leader Charles Manson's final hiding place. She also produced several silk screen works featuring images and text excerpts from newspapers about celebrities and public figures including: Thomas Eagleton, a former U.S. Senator and Vice Presidential candidate whose career faltered when his hospitalizations for depression were made public; Wilbur Mills, a former U.S. Representative who resigned and entered rehab for alcoholism after several public incidents with Fanne Foxe, an exotic dancer; Vince Foster, a deputy White House Counsel under President Bill Clinton who died by suicide after experiencing work-related depression and anxiety; Martha Mitchell, a whistleblower during the Watergate scandal who was allegedly kidnapped, beaten, and drugged in order to silence her; Peter Holm, the ex-husband of actress Joan Collins who had picketed on Collins' lawn to protest their divorce; Manson and his cult, the Manson Family; and others involved in scandal, controversy, or public crimes. Eagleton's son reportedly brought his father to see the exhibition featuring his image. Critic Roberta Smith described the exhibition as "a walk-in scrapbook of various crimes, misdemeanors and scandals." Writing in Frieze, critic David Bussel observed that the people in the images selected by Noland "have been thwarted, in life or in death, by the repercussions of fame, burnt out 'victims.'"

Speaking to curator John S. Weber in 1994, Noland said that she was "not particularly interested" in the "particular people or events" depicted in many of her works. Weber wrote that "What intrigues her is their exemplary function as objects of media attention, along with the voracious news-processing system that conjures them into being." She has said she spends hundreds of hours in news archives searching for source material for these works.

Noland participated in one of the San Francisco Museum of Modern Art's inaugural exhibitions upon the museum's move to a new building in January 1995, the thematic group show Public Information: Desire, Disaster, Document. She presented several silk screen works featuring images of figures from Nixon-era public scandals, along with Publyck Sculpture. In addition, she exhibited her largest stocks sculpture, Tower of Terror (1993-1994), created for the exhibition, an all-aluminum, wider iteration on her stocks format that has enough arm, leg, and head holes for several people.

In March 1995 Noland staged a solo exhibition at the Museum Boijmans Van Beuningen in Rotterdam. She exhibited several silk screened aluminum works featuring images of Hearst and Foster, along with: Hearst's grandfather, newspaper magnate William Randolph Hearst, pictured in campaign posters for his several runs for political office; and First Lady Betty Ford, photographed laughing while sitting next to a young blind child at a charity event. Noland also presented two of her stocks sculptures along with a tire swing sculpture.

In June 1996 Noland opened a solo exhibition at the Wadsworth Atheneum in Hartford, Connecticut. She exhibited several silk screened works on metal leaning against the walls of the gallery, including images of Eagleton, Ford, Foster, Holm, Mills, and Mitchell, along with: Squeaky Fromme, a member of the Manson Family who attempted to assassinate President Gerald Ford; Jacqueline Kennedy Onassis, President Kennedy's widow, pictured with the fashion designer Valentino, whose face had been etched away by Noland; and actor Burt Reynolds. She also installed a set of metal bleachers in the gallery for visitors to sit and view the installation, similar to seating for a sporting event. Additionally, she included a tire swing sculpture, My Amusement, and a stocks sculpture titled Sham Rage. Noland was dissatisfied with the installation prior to its opening, and she spent hours with museum staff adjusting the placement of works until the exhibition "snapped into place," according to the curator. Reviewing the show for the Hartford Courant, critic Owen McNally observed that "Noland makes media voyeurs of us all by seating us in her bleachers." Writing in 1996 about the juxtaposition of her stocks sculptures with her silk screened works, curator Philip Monk said that Noland was exploring a lineage of shame and humiliation in American society: "Placed in the context of media images, [the stocks sculptures] collapsed the centuries between Puritan town square and tabloid exposure..."

Noland also produced an editioned work for the magazine Parkett in 1996 as part of the publication's editions program. The work, Not Titled Yet, consisted of a piece of cardboard with holes cut similar to her stocks sculptures, covered with a lacquer sander sealant and aluminum enamel spray paint.

In 1999 Noland exhibited in a group show curated by artist Robert Gober at Matthew Marks Gallery in New York, alongside work by Anni Albers, Joan Semmel, Nancy Shaver, and video artist Robert Beck. Noland presented her first new work to be exhibited in several years, Stand-In for a Stand-In, a variant of her stocks sculptures made out of cardboard and wood and covered in silver paint, sitting on a rubber mat, which Gober placed in the center of the gallery space. She called the piece a "study after the fact" of her earlier stocks sculptures. Several critics wrote that Gober's layout for the installation resembled the division of familial or domestic archetypes, with Noland's work representing violence or discipline. (Note: As described by Jerry Saltz, Peter Schjeldahl, and Gregory Williams.)

Also in 1999, Noland staged a two-artist exhibition with artist and writer Olivier Mosset at the Migros Museum of Contemporary Art in Zurich. Noland exhibited several new sculptures made with a-frames which she placed as barricades in various parts of the gallery; she made these works by threading a length of plywood painted white through the center of multiple white plastic a-frames, which she was able to move back and forth along the plywood to change the visual composition of the sculptures. The only other new work in the exhibition was a large cardboard tube that Noland covered completely with sheets of adhesive paper bearing black-and-white logos. She also exhibited a number of earlier works borrowed from museums and private collections, including multiple pieces consisting of metal poles standing in the center of car tires, a large silk screen work of a brick wall, and Publyck Sculpture. In addition, she used a chain-link fence to cordon off several sections of the gallery, rendering the areas inside inaccessible.

=== 2000s: Retreat from art world ===
Following a group exhibition in 2000 with Team Gallery in New York, Noland largely stopped exhibiting new work or engaging publicly with the art world for over a decade. The exhibition in 2000 featured a new a-frame barricade sculpture, which Noland installed so it almost completely blocked the entrance to the small gallery space. An unnamed art dealer attempted to purchase an edition of the sculpture, but Noland had instructed the gallery not to sell her work to other art dealers; the owner of Team Gallery, José Freire, said of Noland, "This was a person who wanted her work treated in a certain way." By the end of the exhibition, the work hadn't sold, and Noland asked the gallery to get rid of it by placing the a-frames in the street one at a time over several days until they were taken or disappeared. Parrino, Noland's friend and also a participant in the exhibition, described this as akin to "a serial killer disposing of a body."

In 2003 Noland's work The Big Slide (1989) was included in the Italian pavilion at the 50th Venice Biennale. The same year, David Zwirner Gallery attempted to include a work by Noland in a group exhibition in New York, but she requested its removal when she learned about the show. In 2004 she wrote an essay for Artforum on artist Andy Warhol, whose work she admires.

Noland's extended absence from the art world spurred several galleries to attempt to mount unauthorized exhibitions, including a show at the nonprofit gallery Triple Candie in 2006 comprising inexact remakes of Noland's work made by other artists. Art critics in New York reacted negatively to the show, with Jerry Saltz calling the exhibition "an aesthetic act of karaoke, identify theft, [and] body snatching." Writing in The New York Times, critic Ken Johnson called the Triple Candie show "confused, confusing and duplicitous."

=== 2010s: Artwork disavowals, legal proceedings, retrospective ===
Prior to an auction at Sotheby's in March 2012 that was to include several works by Noland, the auction house removed Noland's aluminum print Cowboys Milking (1990) from the sale after she disavowed the work. Noland had visited the auction house to view the condition of several works set to be sold, and deemed Cowboys Milking to be damaged beyond repair. The work's owner, gallerist Marc Jancou, later sued both Noland and the auction house for a combined $26 million, but a judge dismissed the suit.

Also in 2012, galleries and art dealers attempting to exhibit Noland's work for sale began posting disclaimers to inform audiences that the artist had not been involved with or agreed to the exhibition of her work. The first such disclaimer, at the artist's request, accompanied an exhibition of her work organized by dealer Christopher D'Amelio at the Art Basel art fair and stated that Noland did not think D'Amelio was "an expert or authority on her artwork, did not select the artwork being displayed in this exhibition, and in no way endorses Mr D'Amelio's arrangement of her work."

In 2013, art dealer Larry Gagosian attempted to organize an exhibition of Noland's work at his eponymous gallery with curator Francesco Bonami. In the text accompanying an interview with Noland conducted the same year, author Sarah Thornton wrote that Noland had responded to the gallery's outreach by threatening to shoot Gagosian if he followed through on the exhibition, telling Thornton that she did not want to be "saved from obscurity." Noland added that "Artists go to Gagosian to die. It's like an elephant graveyard." When asked a decade later about the alleged incident, she said only that "I wasn't interested in having an unauthorized show." Noland also told Thornton that handling the issue of non-approved exhibitions or restoration of her work was "a full-time thing" that had impacted her time and ability to make new art. Noland's interview with Thornton – the artist's first in over a decade – was itself accompanied by a disclaimer requested by Noland that said the artist had not approved the text. In 2014, another disclaimer was posted at an exhibition featuring Noland's work at the Brant Foundation, saying that Noland "reserves her attention for projects of her own choosing" and "hasn't given her approval or blessing to this show."

In June 2015, Ohio-based art collector Scott Mueller filed a lawsuit in the Southern District of New York seeking to reverse his 2014 purchase of Noland's sculpture Log Cabin (1990) for $1.4 million; he stated that Noland had disavowed the work by not approving the extensive restoration of the piece. According to Mueller, the artist disavowed her sculpture after its sale to him, because she believed the work had been restored "beyond recognition." Michael Janssen, the owner of the gallery which sold the piece to Mueller, stated that Noland had not disavowed Log Cabin, saying that she "merely wanted the value to be depreciated". The restoration in question occurred after a long-term loan to Suermondt-Ludwig-Museum in Aachen, Germany, where the logs had deteriorated from 10 years of outdoor exposure. A conservator was consulted and hired to complete the restoration in Germany, where all the decayed wood was replaced by logs obtained from the same Montana source as the originals. Noland, who believes she should have been consulted about this, felt the extensively restored piece was essentially recreated, and was therefore an unauthorized copy of the original, violating her copyright protections as outlined in the Visual Artists Rights Act (VARA). Mueller's lawsuit was dismissed in 2016. After Noland filed her own lawsuit claiming damages under VARA, she became involved in increasingly complicated legal battles over the restoration of Log Cabin and the application of copyright law to the materials used in her sculpture, German vs. US laws, and her rights to copyright as a living artist. The United States Copyright Office later ruled that Log Cabin was ineligible for copyright protection because, as a simple wooden structure, the work "lacked sufficient original or creative authorship" as defined by U.S. copyright law, and the office "explicitly disregarded Noland's 'conceptual choices' in creating the work." Noland's lawsuit was also later dismissed, with courts deciding that her rights had not been violated.

In November 2017 gallery Venus Over Manhattan opened an exhibition of historical work by Noland and Alexander Calder, staged with Noland's permission and participation. The exhibition, Kinetics of Violence: Alexander Calder + Cady Noland, juxtaposed two works each by the artists. Noland exhibited Corral Gates (1989), a series of gates meant for livestock decorated with saddles and bullets, and Gibbet (1993-1994), a stocks sculpture fitted with an American flag covering its surface. Critic Andreas Petrossiants wrote in The Brooklyn Rail that the pairing of Noland and Calder had the effect of "re-politicizing a thoroughly de-politicized Calder," reminding audiences of the latter artist's sustained engagement with anti-war and anti-fascist politics.

Following nearly two decades of little public activity aside from her high-profile legal disputes, Noland staged her first ever museum retrospective exhibition in 2018 at the Museum für Moderne Kunst (MMK) in Frankfurt. The curator, museum director Susanne Pfeffer, said she was able to organize the show after convincing a mutual acquaintance to give her Noland's phone number and meeting her at a café in New York. Noland has a fear of flying and was unable to visit the museum to plan for the exhibition, so Pfeffer visited New York every three weeks for a year to plan the show with scale models of the gallery spaces; Pfeffer said "it was and still is a very intense and close collaboration." The artist's work was installed in every gallery in the museum, often in spaces not usually used for displaying art like hallways, corners, and on walls high above eye level. In addition to work from every era of Noland's practice, the exhibition included works by a range of other artists from the museum's collection selected by Noland, including Michael Asher, Joseph Beuys, Bill Bollinger, Claes Oldenburg, Parrino, Charlotte Posenenske, Sturtevant, Andy Warhol, Franz West, and Noland's father Kenneth. Two permanent installations in the museum by Beuys and Oldenburg were sealed off with a wall to prevent viewing; Pfeffer called this decision "practical" as the works are immovable and did not fit in the theme of the show, but critic Leah Pires interpreted the gesture as "a delicious power play, especially coming from two women." The retrospective was broadly acclaimed in German and international media. (Note: The exhibition received positive reviews in Süddeutsche Zeitung, Frankfurter Allgemeine Zeitung, Die Tageszeitung, The White Review, Frieze, Kunstkritikk, ArtReview, Art in America, Springerin, and Artforum.) Several publications included the show in lists of the best art exhibitions of 2018 and 2019. (Note: The exhibition was featured on year-end lists in NRC, ArtReview, The Quietus, and L'Officiel USA.)

Noland also agreed to participate in a group exhibition in October 2019, curated by artist Paul Pfeiffer for Bortolami gallery, staged in an empty bank at Washington's Watergate complex. The exhibition included a chain-link fence sculpture by Noland – Institutional Field (1991) – that was placed flat on the gallery floor.

=== 2020s: Return to exhibiting new work ===
In 2021, Noland exhibited new work in New York for the first time in over twenty years. Her exhibition Cady Noland: THE CLIP-ON METHOD at Galerie Buchholz debuted four a-frame barricade sculptures and two chain-link fence sculptures, including one fence blocking the gallery's only window. She also covered the gallery floor with a gray carpet and showed several silk screen works from the 1990s featuring reproductions of descriptions from police officer training manuals of supposedly justified violent policing techniques. Several critics noted that the freshly installed industrial carpet emitted a distinct chemical smell in the gallery. The exhibition coincided with the self-publication of an artist's book of the same name documenting many of Noland's works, exhibitions, and writings, along with a range of sociological essays and articles she selected. Writing in The New Yorker, Johanna Fateman said the exhibition displayed an "oppressive mood of sordid Americana – the carceral harmonizing with the corporate."

Noland presented new work again in 2023 at a solo exhibition with Gagosian Gallery in New York, a decade after refusing Gagosian's earlier attempts to stage an exhibition of her work. The exhibition, staged in a small gallery space on the Upper East Side, included over a dozen new untitled works by Noland made from objects like filing cabinets, lucite tables, beer cans, bullets, police badges, and inert grenades, including several small objects encased in clear acrylic cubes, in addition to tape and vinyl markings on the gallery floor. Noland also exhibited a single historical work, Untitled (1986), consisting of a metal walker adorned with leather gloves, a holster, and other objects. Critic Isabel Ling wrote that the tape on the floor made the installation resemble a crime scene and said the pieces on view, much smaller than many of Noland's earlier installation works, represented "a turn toward the interior." The entirety of the exhibition was purchased by the private museum Glenstone.

In October 2024 Glenstone mounted a survey of Noland's work, created "in collaboration with the artist," according to the museum. The show included work from Glenstone's collection from every era of Noland's practice, including all the works she exhibited at Gagosian in 2023. Additionally, Noland installed several new objects around her most recent work, including industrial plastic pallets, a cast aluminum box branded with a Pinkerton logo, and a metal platform with a barcode identifying it as belonging to an Amazon warehouse. Saul Ostrow, reviewing the exhibition in The Brooklyn Rail, wrote that the show, along with Noland's other exhibitions of new work in the early 2020s, represented "her comeback tour."

Noland staged her second solo exhibition with Gagosian in late 2025 at gallery's Chelsea location, a large show of new sculptural installations and a number of works comprising or featuring large signs reading "SALE".

== Analysis and themes ==
Critics and art historians have used several terms to label Noland's style and artistic practice in relation to other artists working both before and during her time. Artist and writer Olivier Mosset said in 1989 that Noland's work was part of a second, less restrained generation of the Neo-geo (Neo-Geometric Conceptualism) movement. Mosset wrote that the layout of Noland's works has an "apparent casualness" that signals a questioning of the importance or centrality of the notion of the art object. Curator Ralph Rugoff included Noland's work in an exhibition in 1990 exploring what he called "pathetic art", which he described as art that "makes failure its medium"; critics also later termed this "abject art". Charles Hagen, writing in The New York Times in 1991, labeled Noland's work an example of a "recent resurgence in what might be called hardware art", grouping Noland with artists including Ashley Bickerton and Wolfgang Staehle. Critic Jack Bankowsky used the term "slack art" to describe Noland's work in Artforum in 1991, which he said was art that "depends on consciously courted chaos". Bankowksy identified Noland's piece Dirt Corral (1984-1985) – a work consisting of several decorative furniture panels arranged together on the floor – as the work that marked the beginning of this stylistic movement, which he wrote also included artists like Karen Kilimnik and Jack Pierson. Roberta Smith, writing in the Times, called Noland "a leading practitioner of a kind of 90's Process art sometimes known as scatter art".

Writing in 1993 in Texte zur Kunst about contemporaneous attempts by critics to define "scatter art", art historian Pamela M. Lee argued that Noland's work did not fit under this label, as the random-seeming nature of her installations was in fact the result of intentional choices; Lee further asserted that the term "scatter art" was an inapt description of the supposed movement which represented an attempt by critics to associate contemporary artists with an earlier generation of avant-garde artists like Robert Morris, Robert Smithson, and Barry Le Va. Art historian and critic Bruce Hainley has also pushed back on descriptions of Noland's work as "scatter art" or "pathetic art", writing that her work was "mistaken" as such in the 1990s but that her retrospective in 2018 reframed her as "an unusually consistent maker of discrete objects". Critic Lane Relyea, writing in 1991, included Noland among a group of artists making work in the legacy of Pop art but with a pessimistic tone, which he called "Neo-pop". Critics have also pointed to the scale of and industrial materials used in many of her works as examples of her utilization of the stylistic hallmarks of minimalism, often deployed for a purposefully sinister or controlling effect. (Note: As described by Sabine Vogel, Travis Jeppesen, Martha Buskirk, and Jan Avgikos.) Writers have also labeled her work an example of post-minimalist sculpture and installation. Writing in art press, curator Klaus Ottmann contended that Noland's work embodied what art historian Michael Fried had termed the "theatricality" of minimalism in his essay "Art and Objecthood"; Ottmann also argued that Noland's works must be understood in the context of their larger installation settings rather than as individual works.

Many critics have identified the collapse of the American Dream as a core theme in Noland's work; (Note: As described by Lane Relyea, Abbie Weinberg, Martin Herbert, and Emily Watlington.) curator Christian Rattemeyer labeled this the "American Nightmare". Noland has said she explores aspects of American culture she considers uniquely toxic, including status seeking, celebrity, violence, and death, all of which fit into what she has called "a meta-game" underpinning American society, the rules and existence of which she says are kept from most people, particularly minorities. Several critics have also remarked on Noland's thematic focus on a specific geographic and socioeconomic subsection of American society, namely rural working class communities. (Note: Discussed by Roberta Smith and Lane Relyea.) She has also extensively utilized American flags in her work; multiple critics have compared her use of the flag to that of Jasper Johns, writing that Noland's deployment of the symbol, often crumpled, torn, or otherwise sullied, represents a larger rejection of the flag's value as a cultural icon than what Johns achieved with his various iterations on Flag. (Note: Comparison made by Michael Wilson, John Quin, and Diehl & Røhling.) Others have compared Noland's examination of American culture and iconography to Robert Frank's photography book The Americans, (Note: Comparison made by Lane Relyea, Gary Garrels, and Christopher Knight.) and to the work of American short story writers like Raymond Carver and William S. Burroughs.

Critics and art historians have written that Noland's work also deals with themes of physical and mental restriction, often using metal, fencing, and barriers to create feelings of combining or decoupling as well as danger. (Note: As described by Jeanne Siegel, Jeffrey Deitch, Christian Rattemeyer, and Martha Buskirk.) Her use of medical devices like IVs, walkers, and sight canes has also been noted as exploring similar themes of restriction and distress. Writer Jim Lewis described Noland's artistic medium as "borders and paths: on the one hand fences, boundaries, confines, gates, and barriers; and on the other their violation..." Noland has connected her use of architectural interventions like gates and barriers to her exploration of psychopathology; she has said she aims to explore what it means to treat people like objects by guiding or restricting their movements, in the same way she says psychopaths view others as objects for use and eventual discard. She told writer Jeanne Siegel in 1989 that "A good way to decipher my pieces is to look at how they 'behave'". Noland has on several occasions discussed the use and importance of metal in her work, saying in an interview in 1994 that "Metal is a major thing, and a major thing to waste". Writing in October in 1995, critic Liz Kotz suggested that Noland's thematic examinations of confinement and aggression could be viewed through a feminist lens "as very interesting work about gender", although critics at the time generally did not see Noland's work as such.

Violence, both interpersonal and accidental, has been identified as another key theme in Noland's work; (Note: Identified by Daniela Salvioni, Jeanne Siegel, Michèle Cone, and Andreas Petrossiants.) she has often used images of murder, violent accidents, and weaponry, and has incorporated a wide array of physical weapons into her sculptures and installations, including billy clubs, grenades, guns, and bullets. In her essay "Towards a Metalanguage of Evil" she wrote that the supposed ideal end of the "meta-game" in American society is an "action death", or death in a violent accident of some kind. Noland's friend and fellow artist Steven Parrino wrote that Noland's "subjects are not social anthropology but clues to herself", adding that several works were inspired by Noland's own various fears of car crashes, flying, and cults. Critic Martin Herbert suggested that Noland "was not playing with her subject matter but angrily terrified of it, and her anger and fear were channeled into articulacy". Humiliation and shame are also recurring themes in Noland's work, with critics pointing to her stocks sculptures and photographic silk screen work featuring tabloid imagery as examples. (Note: As described by Philip Monk, Francis Summers, and John S. Weber.)

By using press photographs for her silk screen works, critics have posited that she is reframing the images and drawing attention to the structures involved in reproducing photographs or information. Noland often reorients the texts and images she uses in these works, flipping, inverting, or turning on their sides the photographs and excerpts she appropriates, an effect Hainley called "discombobulations". Writing in 1996, critic Christopher Hume said Noland "turns media images into shiny sculpted logos". Others have written that these works, often featuring notable or notorious figures or archetypes from American society who have become famous through scandal or crime, explore a distinctly American form of celebrity and media culture, showcasing the ways American media elevates, commodifies, and discards specific people who have publicly transgressed in some way. (Note: As described by Robert C. Morgan, John S. Weber, and Philip Monk.) Writing in Parachute, critic Abbie Weinberg proposed that "the flatness" of Noland's silkscreen cut-out works "is a metaphor for the two-dimensionality of Western culture's iconography". Similarly, curator Francesco Bonami wrote that "the flat form" of her cut-out works "alludes to the undercurrent of violence concealed within one-dimensional, stereotypical images of America and its myths". Additionally, Noland's use of silk screened appropriated media images has been widely compared to Andy Warhol's practice and techniques. A broad array of critics and art historians have cited Warhol's work as a direct precedent to Noland's. (Note: Warhol is cited as a precedent to, influence on, or counterpoint to Noland by Roberta Smith, Roy Arden, Peter Schjeldahl, Bozidar Brazda, David Breslin, Bob Nickas, and Martin Herbert.)

Several critics have suggested that Noland's legal disputes surrounding the sale, restoration, and treatment of various works, along with her nearly two-decade long self-imposed distance from the traditional gallery ecosystem, were themselves a form of artistic statement and communication. (Note: Suggested by Bozidar Brazda, Seph Rodney, Martin Herbert, and Frazer Ward.) Writing for T: The New York Times Style Magazine in 2019, Zoë Lescaze posited that "She has become known as the art world's boogeyman, but she might be its conscience". Some critics have proposed that Noland's artwork disavowals and longtime rejection of art world institutions are a rejection of the art market itself; (Note: Proposed by Seph Rodney, Martin Herbert, and Frazer Ward.) critic Seph Rodney labeled her actions "(performance) art as poison pill", while art historian Frazer Ward described them as an "attack on the market". Herbert has noted that Noland's seeming disappearance from producing or exhibiting new work in the 2000s and 2010s had, in effect, caused increases in secondary market prices for her work, a function of the art market's economic model of scarcity and exclusivity.

Noland's legal disputes surrounding the handling of her work have also been extensively discussed by critics and academics in the contexts of art authentication, the limits of copyrightability in the United States, and the scope of artists' moral rights under U.S. law.

== Influence and legacy ==
Numerous critics, art historians, and artists have cited Noland as a significant influence on contemporary art beginning in the 1990s. Critic Roberta Smith has written several times about Noland's influence, saying that she had helped define a set of "fashionable parameters" for installation artists of the 1990s, which Smith described as "junk and juxtaposition – the devalued and the unexpected." Smith wrote in 2002 that Noland's exhibition in 1989 at American Fine Arts Co. marked "one of the earliest signs of change" in contemporary art's shift from the stylistic trends of the 1980s, saying that "Noland's contribution is unquestionable, but she is becoming even more mythic in her absence" from the commercial art world. Critic Jerry Saltz, writing in The Village Voice in 2006, said Noland was "the crucial link between late-1980s commodity art and much that has followed".

In 2007, New York magazine called Noland "The most radical artist of the eighties" and said that her work had "predicted a hundred other artists". Critics have cited a wide range of artists as working in Noland's stylistic legacy, including Jesse Darling, Diamond Stingily, Cameron Rowland, Andra Ursuța, Kelley Walker, Nate Lowman, Banks Violette, Rachel Harrison, Josephine Meckseper, Steven Shearer, Anna Sew Hoy, Liz Larner, Jon Kessler, Sam Durant, Matt Keegan, Helen Marten, Bozidar Brazda, and the collaborative work of Joe Bradley and Eunice Kim. Artists including Mary Heilmann, Johannes Kahrs, Cosima von Bonin, Meckseper, and Brazda have all themselves cited Noland as an inspiration or influence on their work.

Curator and professor Bill Arning, speaking in 2018, said that his students "shero worship her. The idea of someone who is that firm in her decision making, [who] can say no to all the cash and prizes."

== Personal life ==
Noland has never publicly spoken at length or released information about her early life, biography, or personal life. There are only two known public photographs of the artist as an adult; in one of the images, taken at Documenta in 1992, she is covering her face with her hands. On several occasions when requested to provide photos of herself for publications, she has submitted images of herself as a child in lieu of more current photographs.

== Art market ==
In 2011, Noland's work set the then-record for the highest price ever paid for an artwork by a living woman when Oozewald (1989), a silk screen work depicting Lee Harvey Oswald, sold at Sotheby's for $6.6 million. Noland's red silk screen on aluminum, Bluewald (1989), also depicting Oswald, sold for $9.8 million at Christie's in May 2015, setting a new auction record for the artist's work.

== Exhibition history ==
Noland has staged numerous solo exhibitions in the United States and internationally. She staged a large number of shows in the late 1980s and early-mid 1990s, but stopped exhibiting for nearly 20 years beginning in the early 2000s. Noland's notable solo exhibitions include White Room: Cady Noland (1988), White Columns, New York; New West-Old West (1990), Luhring Augustine Hetzler, Los Angeles; Cady Noland (1994), Paula Cooper Gallery, New York; Cady Noland (2018-2019), Museum für Moderne Kunst, Frankfurt, the artist's first retrospective exhibition; Cady Noland: THE CLIP-ON METHOD (2021), Galerie Buchholz, New York, the artist's first exhibition of new work in the United States in over twenty years; and Cady Noland (2023), Gagosian Gallery, New York.

Noland has also participated in a wide list of notable group exhibitions, including the 44th and 50th Venice Biennale (1990, 2003); Whitney Biennial (1991); and Documenta 9 (1992).

== Notable works in public collections ==
- The American Trip (1988), Museum of Modern Art, New York
- The Big Slide (1989), Art Institute of Chicago
- Celebrity Trash Spill (1989), Kunstmuseum Liechtenstein, Vaduz
- Deep Social Space (1989), Museum Brandhorst, Munich
- Oozewald (1989), Glenstone, Potomac, Maryland; and Museum of Contemporary Art, Antwerp
- Tanya as a Bandit (1989), Museum Brandhorst, Munich; Museum of Modern Art, New York; and Whitney Museum, New York
- This Piece Has No Title Yet (1989), Rubell Museum, Miami/Washington, D.C.
- Bluewald (1989-1990), Wadsworth Atheneum, Hartford, Connecticut
- Sham Death (1993-1994), The Broad, Los Angeles
- Publyck Sculpture (1994), Glenstone, Potomac, Maryland
- 4 in One Sculpture (1998), Hessel Museum of Art, Annandale-on-Hudson, New York
- Untitled (2008), Walker Art Center, Minneapolis

== Publications ==
- Noland, Cady (1989). "Towards a Metalanguage of Evil". Balcon (in English and Spanish). No. 4. Translated by Vázquez de Parga, Consuelo. pp. 70–85. OCLC 1055661925. Revised and expanded version published 1992, in Cady Noland: Towards a Metalanguage of Evil = Zu einer Metasprache des Bösen (in English and German). Ostfildern: Hatje Cantz Verlag. ISBN 9783893225187. OCLC 47715800.
- Noland, Cady; Anastas, Rhea, eds. (2021). Cady Noland: The Clip-On Method. New York: Cady Noland, Rhea Anastas, and Robert Snowden. ISBN 9780578903149. OCLC 1261635697.
- Noland, Cady, ed. (2025). Cady Noland: Polaroids 1986–2024. New York: Gagosian Gallery / Rizzoli International Publications. ISBN 9781951449957. OCLC 1536326372.

== Citations, notes, and references ==
=== Cited references ===
- Adler, Amy (March 2016). "Cowboys Milking Formerly Attributed to Cady Noland". The Brooklyn Rail. OCLC 64199099. Archived from the original on February 20, 2024.
- Adler, Amy (June 2023). "Artificial Authenticity" (PDF). New York University Law Review. 98 (3): 706–769. OCLC 46988231. Archived (PDF) from the original on September 9, 2024.
- Albrethsen, Pernille (March 1, 2019). "A Bit of the Old Ultra-Violence". Kunstkritikk – Nordic Art Review. OCLC 786285268. Archived from the original on February 24, 2024.
- Anastas, Rhea (Fall 2010). "American Fine Arts: Laboratory of Exhibition and Idea: A Close-to-Your-Chest Goof". Archives of American Art Journal. Vol. 49, no. 3–4. pp. 60–63. OCLC 1566307. JSTOR 23025812.
- Arden, Roy (Fall 2001). "Swinging Lumpen: Recent Work by Steven Shearer Rocks the Conventions of High Art". Canadian Art. Vol. 183, no. 3. pp. 44–48. OCLC 952970993. ProQuest 216886852.
- Avgikos, Jan (November–December 1989). "Degraded World". Artscribe International. No. 78. pp. 54–57. OCLC 13182196.
- Avgikos, Jan (October 2021). "Cady Noland". Artforum. Vol. 60, no. 2. p. 170. OCLC 20458258. ProQuest 2605262195. Archived from the original on June 3, 2024.
- Bankowsky, Jack (November 1991). "Slackers". Artforum. Vol. 30, no. 3. p. 96. OCLC 20458258. Archived from the original on November 5, 2023.
- Brazda, Bozidar; Meckseper, Josephine; Trezzi, Nicola (January–February 2012). "Cady Noland: Silencer". Flash Art. Vol. 45, no. 282. pp. 64–68. OCLC 299855644. EBSCOhost 85145460. Archived from the original on November 5, 2021.
- Breslin, David (April 2014). "Plugs: Five Thoughts on Cady Noland's Stocks". The Common. No. 7. pp. 130–137. OCLC 650080945. EBSCOhost 102420764.
- Buskirk, Martha (December 11, 2018). "Cady Noland's Pathological America". Hyperallergic. OCLC 881810209. Archived from the original on February 20, 2024.
- Chused, Richard (Fall 2019). "'TEMPORARY' CONCEPTUAL ART: PROPERTY AND COPYRIGHT, HOPES AND PRAYERS". Rutgers Computer & Technology Law Journal. 45 (2). Newark, New Jersey: Rutgers Law School. OCLC 8496275. Gale A647509760.
- Deitch, Jeffrey (1991). "Fushigi na chūshō" 不思議及抽象 [Strange Abstraction]. Fushigi na chūshō: Gendai Amerika no sen'eitachi: Robāto Gōbā, Kenedī Nōrando, Firippu Tāfu, Kuristofā Wūru 不思議双抽象 [Strange Abstraction: Modern American Pioneers: Robert Gober, Cady Noland, Philip Taaffe, Christopher Wool] (Exhibition catalogue) (in Japanese and English). Tokyo: Touko Museum of Contemporary Art. pp. 8–18. OCLC 27724264.
- Diehl, Travis; Røhling, Rasmus (August 17, 2019). "Cady Came Home". X-TRA. OCLC 809603912. Archived from the original on July 14, 2024.
- Faust, Gretchen (September 1989). "New York in Review". Arts Magazine. Vol. 64, no. 1. pp. 92–95. OCLC 5503172.
- Frye, Brian L. (Summer 2021). "Conceptual Copyright". South Dakota Law Review. 66 (2). Vermillion, South Dakota: University of South Dakota School of Law: 183–199. OCLC 1642397. Gale A686656597. Archived from the original on July 24, 2024.
- Garrels, Gary; Phillips, Sandra; Riley, Robert; Weber, John S. (December 1994). "The Informers". Artforum (Interview). Vol. 33, no. 4. Interviewed by Schwartzman, Allan. pp. 58–61, 102. OCLC 20458258. Gale A16547728. Archived from the original on November 4, 2023.
- Hainley, Bruce (January 2019). "The Picture of Little C.N. in a Prospect of Horrors". Artforum. Vol. 57, no. 5. OCLC 20458258. Archived from the original on June 21, 2024.
- Halperin, Julia (October 4, 2024). "Just How Much Control Can an Artist Have Over Their Work?". T: The New York Times Style Magazine. OCLC 56425907. Archived from the original on October 6, 2024.
- Herbert, Martin (2016). "Freedom's Just Another Word: Cady Noland". Tell Them I Said No. Berlin: Sternberg Press. pp. 103–111. ISBN 9783956792007. OCLC 950932226.
- Herbert, Martin (March 15, 2019). "Cady Noland Says Yes". ArtReview. OCLC 863456905. Archived from the original on February 27, 2024.
- Hughes, Robert (2015). "Graft–Things You Didn't Know". The Spectacle of Skill: Selected Writings of Robert Hughes. New York: Knopf Doubleday Publishing Group. pp. 523–547. ISBN 9781101875919. OCLC 915135792.
- Jeppesen, Travis (January 2009). "Political Minimal @ KunstWerke". Whitehot Magazine of Contemporary Art. OCLC 1083608934. Archived from the original on May 28, 2024.
- Johnson, Ken (June 1991). "Report from New York: Generational Saga". Art in America. Vol. 79, no. 6. pp. 45–51. OCLC 1121298647.
- Kinsella, Eileen (June 25, 2015). "Cady Noland Disowns $1.4 Million 'Log Cabin' Artwork Sparking Collector Lawsuit". Artnet News. OCLC 959715797. Archived from the original on July 25, 2024.
- Knight, Christopher (January 29, 1995). "ART REVIEW: Ordinary Can Be Extraordinary: In its inaugural show, San Francisco's newest museum shows how artists use everyday photographs as tools to make searing artworks". Los Angeles Times. sec. F, p. 55. OCLC 3638237. ProQuest 293020074.
- Korczynski, Jacob (Summer 2011). "Pierre Leguillon features "Diane Arbus: A Printed Retrospective 1960–1971" & "Cady Noland: The American Dream"". C Magazine. No. 110. pp. 47–48. OCLC 1082164180. ProQuest 877969540.
- Lewin, Tamar (June 3, 1988). "Custody Case Lifts Veil On a 'Psychotherapy Cult'". The New York Times. sec. B, p. 1. OCLC 1645522.
- Liebmann, Lisa; et al. (July 3, 2018) [First published November 1989 in Art in America. Vol. 77, no. 11. pp. 200–201]. "Reviewing American Fine Arts, Co". Art in America. OCLC 1121298647. Archived from the original on September 28, 2024.
- Lydiate, Henry (November 2013). "Material ephemerality". Art Monthly. No. 371. p. 37. OCLC 4547163. Gale A348996888.
- Monk, Philip (1996). "Cady Noland: Tabloid Outlaws". The American Trip: Larry Clark, Nan Goldin, Cady Noland, Richard Prince (Exhibition catalogue). Toronto: The Power Plant. pp. 22–25. ISBN 9780921047070. OCLC 35228423.
- Morgan, Robert C. (May 1991). "Word, Document, Installation: Recent Developments in Conceptual Art". Arts Magazine. Vol. 65, no. 9. pp. 65–69. OCLC 5503172.
- Mosset, Olivier (Fall 1989). "Star Trek, Neo-Geo: The Next Generation". Bomb. No. 29. pp. 66–71. OCLC 61313615. JSTOR 40423901.
- Nickas, Bob (Winter 2019). "Cady Noland at MMK". Spike Art Magazine. No. 58. OCLC 1286852463. Archived from the original on July 16, 2024.
- Noh, Megan E. (May 5, 2020). "U.S. Law's Artificial Cabining of Moral Rights: The Copyrightability Prerequisite and Cady Noland's Log Cabin". The Columbia Journal of Law & the Arts. 43 (3). New York: Columbia Law School: 353–365. OCLC 60627709. Archived from the original on July 24, 2024.
- Noland, Cady (Fall–Winter 1990). "Cady Noland". Journal of Contemporary Art (Interview). Vol. 3, no. 2. Interviewed by Cone, Michèle. OCLC 17432962. Archived from the original on July 7, 2024.
- Noland, Cady (January 1994). "'Metaal is iets substantieels, net als de verspilling ervan': Interview met Cady Noland" ['Metal is a major thing, and a major thing to waste': Interview with Cady Noland] (PDF). Archis (Interview) (in Dutch and English). No. 1. Interviewed by Kremer, Mark; van Winkel, Camiel. pp. 75–80. OCLC 13226833. Archived (PDF) from the original on May 18, 2024.
- Noland, Cady (2003). "Nine Sex Questions: Cady Noland". Art: A Sex Book (Interview). Interviewed by Waters, John; Hainley, Bruce. New York: Thames & Hudson. pp. 195–197. ISBN 9780500284353. OCLC 54936930.
- Noland, Cady (October 2004). "Tin Foiled: Cady Noland". Artforum. Vol. 43, no. 2. p. 151. OCLC 20458258.
- Noland, Cady (2006) [First published 1989 in Balcon. No. 4. pp. 70–85]. "Towards a Metalanguage of Evil". In Anastas, Rhea; Brenson, Michael (eds.). Witness to Her Art: Art and Writings by Adrian Piper, Mona Hatoum, Cady Noland, Jenny Holzer, Kara Walker, Daniela Rossell, and Eau de Cologne. Annandale-on-Hudson, New York: Center for Curatorial Studies, Bard College. pp. 126–141. ISBN 9781931493550. OCLC 80597295.
- Ottmann, Klaus (June 1990). "La mort en action" [Action death]. art press (in French). No. 148. Translated by Matthieussent, Brice. pp. 48–50. OCLC 8102256.
- Parrino, Steven (Spring–Summer 2005). "Paranoia Americana: The New Work of Cady Noland". Afterall (11). London: Central Saint Martins: 3–8. JSTOR 20711565. OCLC 49763160.
- Petrossiants, Andreas (February 2018). "Inside and Outside: Cady Noland and the Violence of the Everyday". The Brooklyn Rail. OCLC 64199099. Archived from the original on June 6, 2024.
- Pires, Leah (April 2019). "Cady Noland". Art in America. Vol. 107, no. 4. pp. 83–85. OCLC 1121298647. EBSCOhost 135510838. Archived from the original on October 7, 2024.
- Quin, John (March 2, 2019). "Once Upon A Time In America: The Violence Of Cady Noland". The Quietus. Archived from the original on May 22, 2024.
- Rattemeyer, Christian (2010). "Cady Noland". In Butler, Cornelia; Schwartz, Alexandra (eds.). Modern Women: Women Artists at the Museum of Modern Art. New York: Museum of Modern Art. pp. 396–399. ISBN 9780870707711. OCLC 501397424 – via Internet Archive.
- Relyea, Lane (January 1993). "Hi-Yo Silver: Cady Noland's America". Artforum. Vol. 31, no. 5. pp. 50–55. OCLC 20458258. Gale A13929234. Archived from the original on June 22, 2024.
- Rodney, Seph (July 21, 2015). "The Art of Cady Noland as Poison Pill". Hyperallergic. OCLC 881810209. Archived from the original on August 8, 2024.
- Rondeau, James; Miller-Keller, Andrea (1996). "Cady Noland/MATRIX 130". Cady Noland (Exhibition pamphlet). Hartford, Connecticut: Wadsworth Atheneum. OCLC 1242424093. Archived (PDF) from the original on June 24, 2016.
- Rubinstein, Meyer Raphael (March–April 1990). "Cady Noland: Massimo De Carlo". Flash Art. No. 151. p. 160. OCLC 299855644.
- Russeth, Andrew (Spring 2018). "This American Life: Cady Noland's Art Feels More Prescient, Incisive, and Urgent Than Ever". ARTnews. Vol. 117, no. 1. OCLC 2392716. Archived from the original on April 18, 2021.
- Saltz, Jerry (July 27, 1999). "Mood swings". The Village Voice. p. 121. OCLC 1696813. ProQuest 232221592.
- Saltz, Jerry (May 9, 2006). "Invasion of the Sculpture Snatchers". The Village Voice. sec. C, p. 81. OCLC 1696813. ProQuest 232284402. Archived from the original on November 30, 2024.
- Salvioni, Daniela (October 1989). "Cady Noland: The Homespun Violence of the Hearth". Flash Art. No. 148. p. 129. OCLC 299855644.
- Schjeldahl, Peter (September 1990). "Venice Anyone?". Mirabella. No. 16. pp. 88–93. OCLC 19822963.
- Schjeldahl, Peter (September 6, 1999). "Selective Affinities". The New Yorker. Vol. 75, no. 2. pp. 86–87. OCLC 320541675.
- Schjeldahl, Peter (September 11, 2006). "New and Old". The New Yorker. Vol. 82, no. 28. p. 87. OCLC 320541675. ProQuest 233128984. Archived from the original on June 16, 2024.
- Siegel, Jeanne (December 1989). "The American Trip: Cady Noland's Investigations". Arts Magazine. Vol. 64, no. 4. pp. 42–45. OCLC 5503172.
- Smith, Roberta (May 5, 1989). "Review/Downtown Galleries; Old, New, Traditional and Alternate Spaces". The New York Times. sec. C, p. 30. OCLC 1645522. Archived from the original on June 21, 2022.
- Smith, Roberta (June 4, 1989). "Art That Hails From the Land of Déjà Vu". The New York Times. sec. H, pp. 29, 38. OCLC 1645522.
- Smith, Roberta (May 26, 1994). "Review/Art; The New Warhol Museum: A Shrine for an Iconoclast". The New York Times. sec. C, p. 13. OCLC 1645522. ProQuest 429732520. Archived from the original on October 3, 2023.
- Steer, Tim (February 2019). "Cady Noland". Art Monthly. No. 423. pp. 26–28. OCLC 4547163. ProQuest 2224936503 Gale A673360654.
- Stillman, Nick (March 8, 2010). "The Escape Hatch: On Cady Noland". The Nation. Vol. 290, no. 9. pp. 35–36. OCLC 1643268. EBSCOhost 48135300. Archived from the original on June 14, 2024.
- Summers, Francis (December 10, 2000). "Cady Noland". Grove Art Online. Oxford University Press. doi:10.1093/gao/9781884446054.article.T096914. ISBN 9781884446054. OCLC 268889955.
- Thornton, Sarah (2015) [First published 2014]. "Scene 10: Cady Noland". 33 Artists in 3 Acts. London: Granta. pp. 325–328. ISBN 9781847089076. OCLC 913792712.
- Vogel, Sabine (December 1999). "Olivier Mosset/Cady Noland". Artforum. Vol. 38, no. 4. Translated by Felicella, Elizabeth. p. 155. OCLC 20458258. Archived from the original on November 15, 2023.
- Wakefield, Neville (Summer 1994). "Cady Noland". Artforum. Vol. 32, no. 10. pp. 89–90. OCLC 20458258. Archived from the original on November 19, 2023.
- Ward, Frazer (2018). "Refusals, Disclaimers and Denials: Cady Noland's Recent "Work"". Performance Paradigm. 14: 28–44. OCLC 769588258.
- Watlington, Emily (October 13, 2023). "Why Cady Noland's Disabling America Never Sat Quite Right With Me". Art in America. OCLC 1121298647. Archived from the original on October 9, 2024.
- Weber, John S. (1994). "Cady Noland". Public Information: Desire, Disaster, Document (Exhibition catalogue). San Francisco Museum of Modern Art. pp. 158–159. ISBN 9780918471338. OCLC 30891864.
- Weinberg, Abbie (October–December 1996). "American Trip". Parachute. No. 84. OCLC 501034342. Gale A30079885.
- Williams, Gregory (November–December 1999). "An Exhibition: Curated by Robert Gober". Frieze. No. 49. OCLC 32711926. Archived from the original on September 30, 2023.
- Wilson, Michael (October 2004). ""Just Pathetic"". Artforum. Vol. 43, no. 2. pp. 117–118, 284. OCLC 20458258. ProQuest 214342389. Archived from the original on October 30, 2023.
- Zacharopoulos, Denys (Summer 2022). "Exhibition Histories: Denys Zacharopoulos on Cady Noland's "Towards a Metalanguage of Evil", documenta 9, 1992". Spike Art Magazine. No. 72. pp. 36–41. OCLC 1286852463.
