= Adam Lindemann =

American art collector and writer

Adam Lindemann is a New York-based gallerist, art collector and writer who founded Venus Over Manhattan gallery in New York City in 2012. As an art collector and gallerist, Lindemann is known for setting multiple world records both at auction and privately, including career records for Jeff Koons, Takashi Murakami, Jean-Michel Basquiat and Jean Royère. His personal collection includes work from Richard Prince, Maurizio Cattelan, Damien Hirst, Jeff Koons, Andy Warhol, and Urs Fischer. Lindemann wrote for The New York Observer from 2009 to 2017, and authored two books about contemporary art.

== Biography ==
Lindemann was raised in New York City. he is the son of late businessman George Lindemann and Dr. Frayda B. Lindemann. He graduated from the Lycée Français de New York with a French Baccalaureate, magna cum laude from Amherst College in Spanish and comparative literature, and Yale Law School.

In 2012, he founded the iconoclastic New York-based art gallery Venus Over Manhattan, which staged exhibitions of artists and estates that it represents including Richard Mayhew, Peter Saul, Robert Colescott, Jim Nutt, Peter Saul, Robert Colescott, Richard Mayhew, Keiichi Tanaami, Joseph Elmer Yoakum, Maryan, H.C. Westermann, Jack Goldstein, Joan Brown, Roger Brown, John Dogg, Susumu Kamijo, Ana Benaroya, Anastasia Bay, Sophie Larrimore, Sally Saul, Shinichi Sawada, Katherine Bernhardt, Alexander Calder, Maurizio Cattelan, Mike Kelley, John McCracken, David Medalla, Cady Noland, Raymond Pettibon, Andy Warhol, Franz West, William N. Copley, Walter Dahn, Roy De Forest, the Calder Foundation and the estate of William N. Copley. It acquired the estate of Chicago gallerist Allan Frumkin. Venus over Manhattan began exhibiting digital art in 2022, starting with an exhibition of the generative digital art collection Chromie Squiggles by Snowfro (Erick Calderon), as well as hosting Mints in collaboration with the artist of new Chromie Squiggle works.

In 2021, Lindemann and his wife, gallerist Amalia Dayan, established South Etna in Montauk, NY, a nonprofit organization that brings artist exhibition to Montauk, including Robert Colescott, Faith Ringgold, Eddie Martinez, Sam Moyer, Karen Kilimnik and Lonnie Holley.

On 9 March 2023, Christie’s hosted “ADAM: Works from the Collection of Adam Lindemann”, a single-owner evening sale of major works from Lindemann’s collection acquired over 20 years. Lindemann included works by artists which the collector was well known to publicly support early in his collecting career, namely Andy Warhol, Jeff Koons, Damien Hirst, Richard Prince, Urs Fischer, Rudolf Stingel, and Alexander Calder. All lots in the ADAM auction were sold, with the sale totaling $31,467,240.

== Published work ==
- Lindemann, Adam (2006). Collecting Contemporary. Taschen America Llc. ISBN 978-3822849392.
- Lindemann, Adam (2010). Collecting Design. Taschen America Llc. ISBN 978-3836519939.

== Public auction records ==
In 2007, Lindemann sold the Jeff Koons sculpture, Hanging Heart (Magenta/Gold) (1994–2006), at Sotheby’s for $23.5 million. At the time of the auction, the sale set a new record for the highest price for an artwork by a living artist sold at auction. Hanging Heart (Magenta/Gold) is one of five Hanging Heart sculptures created by Koons in different colours. Lindemann bought the work for $1.2 million in 2003.

He sold a 1982 canvas by Jean-Michel Basquiat, entitled Untitled (Devil), at Christie’s for $57.3 million in 2016, a new world record for the artist at auction at that time. It was purchased by Japanese billionaire, Yusaku Maezawa. Lindemann originally bought the painting at auction for $4.5 million in 2004.

In 2023 Lindemann sold Jean Royère’s “Ours Polaire” Sofa at his eponymous single owner sale ADAM: Works from the Collection of Adam Lindemann held at Christie’s which realized a price of $3,420,000, surpassing its estimate of $1,000,000 - $1,500,000 and setting the auction record for the designer.

== Philanthropy ==
Lindemann is the head of the steering committee of the Metropolitan Museum of Art’s Michael C. Rockefeller wing, which includes works from sub-Saharan Africa, Oceania, and the ancient Americas. He is also Chair of the Fundraising Committee for the Rockefeller wing. He donated a Grade Figure from the Banks Islands to the Met in 2019 and has donated art to the Museum of Contemporary Art in Miami as well as many artworks to the Mead Art Museum at Amherst College. In 2021 Lindemann funded the Art Institute of Chicago’s publication of the catalog for Joseph Yoakum: What I Saw.

== Personal life ==
Lindemann has been married to art dealer and gallerist Amalia Dayan since 2006. She is the granddaughter of Moshe Dayan, and a founding partner at New York Gallery, Lévy Gorvy Dayan, which is run by Dayan, Dominique Lévy, and Brett Gorvy.
