= Venus Over Manhattan =

Art gallery in New York City

Coordinates: 40.76613°N 73.96629°W

Venus Over Manhattan, known as VENUS, was an art gallery founded in 2012 by Adam Lindemann, with two locations in Manhattan, that closed in 2025.

== History ==
Venus Over Manhattan was dedicated to unique and iconoclastic exhibitions featuring the work of both historic and contemporary artists. The gallery has recently staged major and critically acclaimed exhibitions of work by Richard Mayhew, Peter Saul, Robert Colescott and Jim Nutt.

In addition, the gallery has shown artists and estates that it represents including Peter Saul, Robert Colescott, Richard Mayhew, Keiichi Tanaami, Joseph Elmer Yoakum, Maryan, H.C. Westermann, Jack Goldstein, Joan Brown, Roger Brown, John Dogg, Susumu Kamijo, Ana Benaroya, Anastasia Bay, Sophie Larrimore, Sally Saul, and Shinichi Sawada.

In its ten-year history, Venus Over Manhattan has also presented exhibitions of work by Katherine Bernhardt, Alexander Calder, Maurizio Cattelan, Mike Kelley, John McCracken, David Medalla, Cady Noland, Raymond Pettibon, Andy Warhol, Franz West, William N. Copley, Walter Dahn, H.C. Westermann and Roy De Forest.

Venus Over Manhattan has also collaborated with prominent foundations, estates, including the Calder Foundation the estate of William N. Copley, and acquired the estate of Chicago gallerist Allan Frumkin.

As of April 2023, the gallery occupied two spaces at 39 and 55 Great Jones Street in Manhattan’s Noho area.

In July 2025, Lindemann announced in an Artnet guest article that he would close Venus Over Manhattan after its final exhibition for painter Susumu Kamijo.

=== Digital ===
Venus Over Manhattan began exhibiting digital art in 2022, starting with an exhibition of the generative digital art collection Chromie Squiggles by Snowfro (Erick Calderon), one of the leading NFT projects in the digital art space, as well as hosting Mints in collaboration with the artist of new Chromie Squiggle works. In December 2021 during Art Basel Miami, Adam Lindemann moderated a talk between Beeple and American pop artist Peter Saul at the Bass Museum of Art.

=== Artists ===
The gallery represents several living artists, including:

- Peter Saul
- Richard Mayhew
- Keiichi Tanaami
- Susumu Kamijo
- Ana Benaroya
- Sally Saul
- Cornelius Annor
