= Bruce Hainley =

American critic, writer and poet

Bruce Hainley is an American critic, writer and poet. He was a professor in the Criticism and Theory graduate program at the ArtCenter College of Design and at the University of Southern California Roski School of Art & Design. In 2021, he was made chair of the Department of Visual and Dramatic Arts and David and Caroline Minter Professor of Humanities at Rice University. He is a contributing editor at Artforum and Frieze.

In 2003 he co-wrote Art: A Sex Book with filmmaker John Waters. Hainley's 2006 book of poetry, Foul Mouth, was a finalist in the National Poetry Series.

In 2011 Pep Talk published a collection of Hainley's interviews, critical essays, and poems.

In 2014 Hainley wrote a monograph on the artist Elaine Sturtevant, titled Under the Sign of [sic].

== Publications ==
=== Books ===
- Art: A Sex Book. With John Waters. New York: Thames & Hudson. 2003.
- Foul Mouth. Los Angeles: 2nd Cannons Publications. 2006.
- Bruce Hainley: Pep Talk 5. Edited by Sarah Lehrer-Graiwer with contributions by Richard Hawkins and Dianna Molzan. Pep Talk. 2011.
- Under the Sign of [sic]: Sturtevant’s Volte-Face. Semiotext(e). 2014.
- Vile Days: The Village Voice Art Columns, 1985-1988. Editor. Authored by Gary Indiana. Semiotext(e)/MIT Press. 2018.
- Really, No Biggie. CHRRCH BZRR. 2022.
- Correctomundo: Selected Writings 2001–2026. Clementin Seedorf/CTMS. 2026.

=== Anthology contributions ===
- Tom Friedman. Essays by Bruce Hainley, Dennis Cooper, and Adrian Searle. New York: Phaidon Press. 2001.
- Urs Fischer: Kir Royal. Essays by Jörg Heiser, Urs Fischer, and Bruce Hainley. Zurich: JRP-Ringier. 2005.
- Matthew Ronay: Goin' Down, Down, Down. Essays by Michael Glover and Bruce Hainley. Edited by Ziba de Weck Ardalan. Zurich: JRP-Ringier. 2006.
- Tomma Abts. Essays by Jan Verwoert, Bruce Hainley, and Laura Hoptman. New York: Phaidon Press, 2008.
