= Susan Nycum =

American lawyer

Susan H. Nycum is a lawyer who specialises in computer security and intellectual property issues. She worked at the law firm of Chickering and Gregory in San Francisco and then became a partner at the law firm Baker & McKenzie where she headed its IT and intellectual property group. She was a fellow of the Association for Computing Machinery and a member of its council. She was an early member of its special interest group for higher education, SIGUCCS, and was inducted into its hall of fame in 2004. She was Chairwoman of the National Information Systems Advisory Panel in the early 1980s.

Nycum earned a degree from Ohio Wesleyan University. She attended Duquesne University School of Law and graduated from Stanford Law School.

Nycum has worked with fellow information security researcher Donn B. Parker. They co-authored the 1973 study Computer Abuse, a minor classic that was one of the first attempts to define and document computer-related crime.

Nycum is a computer law scholar and has produced studies on the laws surrounding software patents. She has served as an advisor for the United States government as well as several foreign governments. She approved funding for the Internet in her role as an advisory board member for the National Science Foundation.

== Publications ==
- Computer Abuse — Stanford Research Institute, 1973
- Your Computer and the Law — Prentice-Hall, 1975
- Liability for Malfunction of a Computer Program — Rutgers Computer and Technology Law Journal Vol. 1 (1979–1980)
- Troublesome Computer Contract Areas — University of Southern California, 1982
- Software Proprietary Rights — Prentice-Hall, 1982
- Women Leading: Making Tough Choices on the Fast Track — Stephen Greene Press, 1988
