= This Piece Has No Title Yet =

1989 art installation by Cady Noland

- This Piece Has No Title Yet in 2021
- Artist: Cady Noland
- Year: 1989
- Medium: Beer cans, metal scaffolding, mixed media
- Location: Rubell Museum, Miami, Florida

This Piece Has No Title Yet (originally exhibited as This Piece Doesn't Have a Title Yet) is the title of an art installation created by American artist Cady Noland in 1989. The installation premiered at The Mattress Factory in Pittsburgh and was included in the 1991 Whitney Biennial.

== Artwork ==
This Piece Has No Title Yet is a room-sized installation made of several component parts. 1,100 six-packs of Budweiser beer are stacked together, lining the walls of the room. In front of the beer cans are rows of metal scaffolding draped with American flags and Budweiser promotional banners, keeping the stacked cans against the walls. Scattered across the room are cardboard boxes and wooden crates filled with Coca-Cola cans, tools, cleaning supplies, magazines, and American flags. Tools and equipment are littered on the floor, placed where the artist last used them when constructing the piece. A pair of handcuffs and several seatbelts hang from one portion of the scaffolding.

== Exhibition history ==
The work was first installed at The Mattress Factory in Pittsburgh from October to December 1989. Elaine Dannheisser purchased the work after it was shown and subsequently donated it to the Museum of Modern Art. The piece was included in the 1991 Whitney Biennial, where it was installed in a corner on the top floor of the exhibition. Don & Mera Rubell purchased the piece from MoMA in 1996 for their collection, eventually installing it in the Rubell Museum in Miami.

== Reception and analysis ==
Upon seeing the sculpture for the first time, former San Francisco Museum of Modern Art curator John Caldwell called the work "jaw-dropping". Dealer and curator Jeffrey Deitch called the work Noland's "masterpiece, her greatest work."

Critical opinions of the work as installed in the 1991 Whitney Biennial diverged widely, with some critics praising the installation and others heavily critiquing it. Writing in the Los Angeles Times, Christopher Knight said that Noland "pretty much walk[ed] away with the Biennial." Comparing Noland's work positively to what he labeled a mostly "lackluster" group of works by other young artists on the top floor of the exhibition, critic Michael Kimmelman wrote that her installation "slowly suggests in its odd stackings of cans and placement of objects that a mysterious and compulsive sensibility may be at work." Similarly, critic Ken Johnson, grouping Noland with Kiki Smith and Jim Shaw as artists whose "genuinely compelling qualities" should not be overlooked amidst the "prevalence of juvenile tendencies on the top floor," said that she "hits some deep notes" in a "sociological way." Writing in Art Papers, critic Susan Canning said the placement of Noland's "subversive and messily unfinished installation" in the back corner of the exhibition – as opposed to a more well-trafficked gallery near the entrance – represented "the curator's lack of commitment to the social and political discourse of contemporary art." Conversely, critic Thomas McEvilley wrote in Artforum that Noland's installation "might be a candidate for the emperor's new clothes of this biennial." Writing in Women's Art Magazine, critic Louisa Buck said that "while [Noland's] work is a blunt comment on the vacancy of American culture and the banality of art, politics and consumer culture, it seems too loose and arbitrary to have real critical teeth." Critic Arthur Danto called Noland's work an "intolerable and patronizing exercise", writing that her installation and the rest of the works on the top floor of the show exuded a "mood of aggressiveness."

Writing in Artforum in 2010, critic Jeffrey Kastner called the sculpture "show-stopping" and "a real-life experience a hundred times more potent than any postgrad seminar on the artifactual narratives of American abjection." Discussing the beer can motif in the work, critic Lane Relyea wrote that Noland presents "an image of overwhelming intoxication and, at the same time, incredible waste, the whole mighty edifice destined to be chugged and pissed away; and, behind that, another image, that of the eroded canyons of the American West."
