= George Lindemann =

American billionaire businessman (1936–2018)

- Born: George Lyle Lindemann; March 26, 1936; New York City, US
- Died: June 21, 2018 (aged 82); Palm Beach, Florida, US
- Education: Wharton School of the University of Pennsylvania
- Occupation: Businessman
- Title: Chairman and CEO, Southern Union
- Spouse: Frayda B. Lindemann
- Children: 3, including Adam Lindemann

George Lyle Lindemann (March 26, 1936 – June 21, 2018) was an American billionaire businessman known for being the chairman and chief executive officer of Southern Union, a fossil fuel infrastructure and pipeline company. He was also the owner of 19 Spanish-language radio stations and the vice president of the Metropolitan Opera Association in New York City.

He ranked #703 on the Forbes 2018 list of the world's billionaires, with a net worth of US$3.3 billion.

In 2023, the Lindemann family agreed to return 33 ancient statues which had been stolen from Cambodia, valued at $20 million.

== Career ==
In 1957, Lindemann began his career with his father's business, a cosmetics and hair care company called The Nestle-LeMur. From 1962 to 1972, Lindemann was the president of Smith, Miller and Patch, a pharmaceutical company. He sold Permalens, his family's eye-care company that developed the first permanent-wear soft contact lens, to Cooper Labs for $75 million in 1971. In 1972, Lindemann founded cable TV firm Vision Cable, which he sold a decade later to Samuel Irving Newhouse Jr. and his brother for $220 million.

Shortly after, he founded a cell phone company, Metro Mobile, which he later sold to Bell Atlantic for $2.5 billion in 1991. He then shifted his focus to struggling natural gas pipeline company Southern Union, which he had acquired through Metro Mobile in 1990 for $125 million. He was CEO of Southern Union, and sold it in 2012 to Energy Transfer Equity, for approximately $2.0 billion.

Lindemann owned 19 Spanish-speaking radio stations. He was president of Cellular Dynamics and the managing general partner of Activated Communications Limited Partnership beginning in 1982. He was a general partner of Panhandle Eastern. He sat on the board of directors of HI Europe Limited and on the advisory board of Hudson Clean Energy Partners.

According to Forbes 2018 list of the world's billionaires, Lindemann's net worth was US$3.3 billion.

=== Real estate ===
George Lindemann was a previous owner of Aristotle Onassis's New York City townhouse, which was later owned by John C. Whitehead.

== Early life and education ==
George Lindemann was born to a Jewish family in 1936 in New York City. He received a bachelor's degree in economics from the Wharton School of the University of Pennsylvania.

== Art collection ==
George Lindemann was a collector of artwork and artifacts. This includes early 20th century Cartier timepieces and modern art. Several pieces from his collection, including ornate clocks, bejeweled art pieces, luxury objects, and stolen Cambodian artifacts have been featured in Architectural Digest.

Seventy objects from the collection were presented in the exhibit “Cartier masterworks From The George and Frayda Lindemann Collection” at the Walters Art Gallery in Baltimore in 1989. The collection totaled “half an acre of diamonds, rubies, pearls and semiprecious stones set in platinum, gold and silver and features a topaz as big as the Ritz.”

The San Diego Museum of Art featured pieces from the collection in a 1989 show entitled “Reflections of Elegance: Cartier Jewels from the Lindemann Collection”. The collection was the focus of a monograph published by the New Orleans Museum of Art in 1999.

Art experts and archaeologists working with the Cambodian Ministry of Culture have stated that some of the Khmer artworks in Lindemann's collection were "definitely looted." Photographs of his collection included in a 2008 issue of Architectural Digest were identified as looted material sold by Douglas Latchford.

== Philanthropy ==
George Lindemann and his wife Frayda were donors to both Brown and NYU where their children attended. at New York University Law School, which pays full tuition for one year for an NYU law student pursuing public service law. George Lindemann made a donation to support Brown University's Political Theory Project, an effort to encourage the study of political topics from a “variety of ideological perspectives.” The Lindemann Young Artist Development Program at the Metropolitan Opera is named after him and his wife. The Lindemann family also donated to the Greenwich Hospital Foundation.

The Lindemann family are longtime residents of Greenwich, Connecticut. After George Lindemann died, his wife Frayda, sons Adam and George Jr., and daughter Sloan Lindemann Barnett donated to refurbish the Intensive Care Unit (ICU) where George Lindemann received care. They named the ICU in honor of his doctor there, Greenwich physician James A. Brunetti, DO.

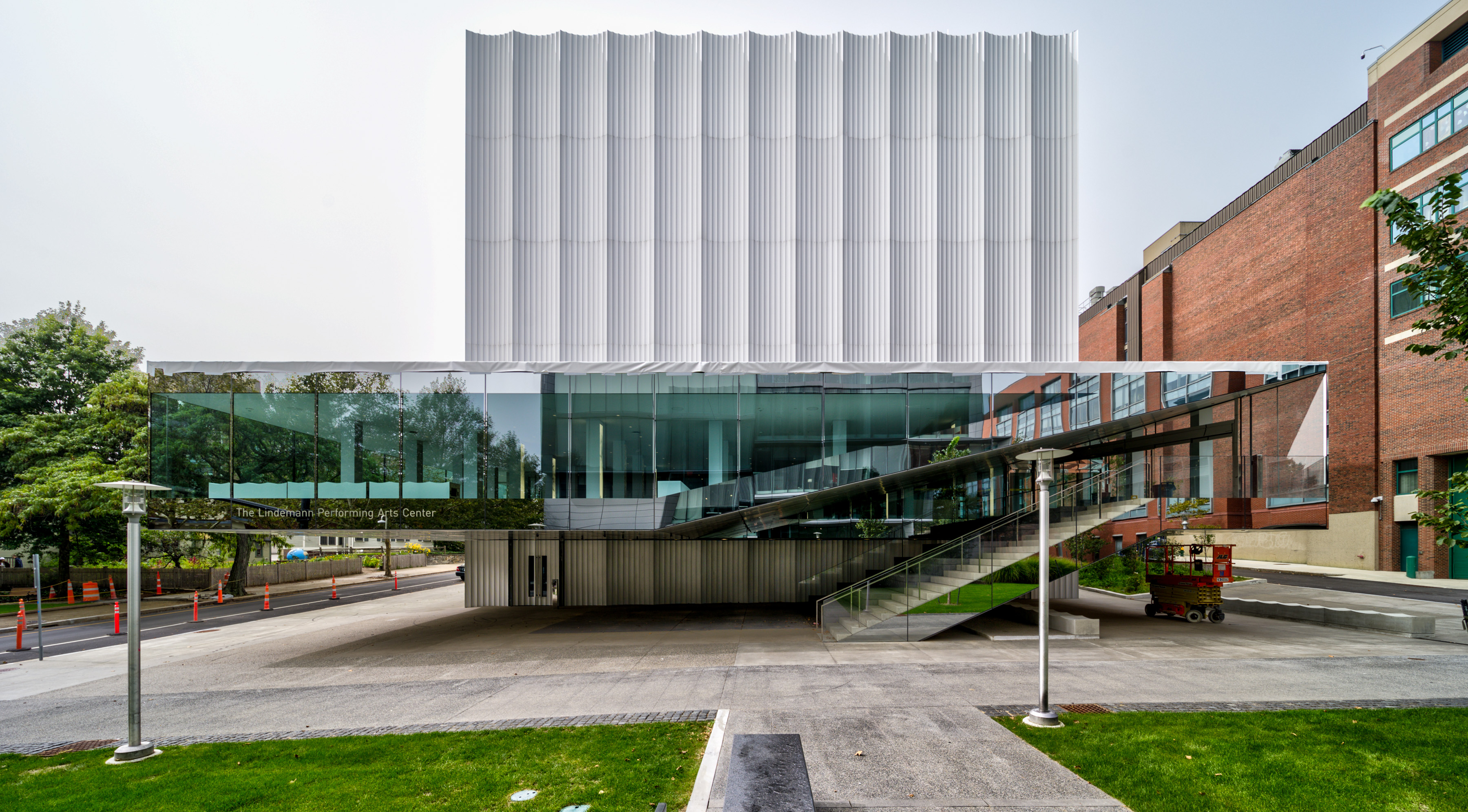
The Lindemann Performing Arts Center

== Political contributions ==
He made donations to Republican candidates, such as Michele Bachmann, Newt Gingrich, Ed Royce, Denny Rehberg, and Virginia Foxx. He was a supporter of the Center for Jewish History.

== Personal life ==
Lindemann was married to Frayda B. Lindemann who is vice-president on the board of the Metropolitan Opera. They have three children, two of whom have been the subject of public controversy.

- Adam Marc Lindemann, president of Lindemann Capital, is an art collector, gallerist, columnist for the New York Observer, and a former champion polo player. In 1989, he married Elizabeth Ashley Graham. Her maternal grandfather is Charles R. Denny, former chairman of the FCC. They had three daughters. The Lindemanns divorced, and Adam is now married to Amalia Dayan, the granddaughter of Moshe Dayan. The couple has two daughters.
- Sloan Lindemann Barnett sits on the board of trustees of the New York University School of Law and runs a natural health products business. She is married to Roger Barnett, CEO of Shaklee, and a son of Victor Barnett and Helaine M. Barnett. They have three children. Photographs of her San Francisco house appeared in the January 2021 issue of Architectural Digest. After publication it emerged that they had been digitally altered to remove images of allegedly looted Khmer sculptures.
- George Lindemann Jr. is an art collector, investor, philanthropist in Miami. He served time in prison after being convicted by a jury for insurance fraud which involved the killing of horses.

Lindemann was the president of the board of directors of the Bass Museum of Art. He lived in Palm Beach, Florida, but sold the house in 2008. He had other homes on the Upper East Side and in Greenwich, Connecticut. As of September 2011, he was the 736th richest person in the world, and the 220th richest in the US, with an estimated wealth of US$2.1 billion. He owned a 180-foot schooner, Adela, which has won international sailing competitions. Lindemann was a member of the Jewish Federation of Palm Beach County.
