= Bozidar Brazda =

Canadian artist (born 1972)

Bozidar Brazda (born 1972 in Cambridge, Canada) is an artist. He lives and works in New York City.

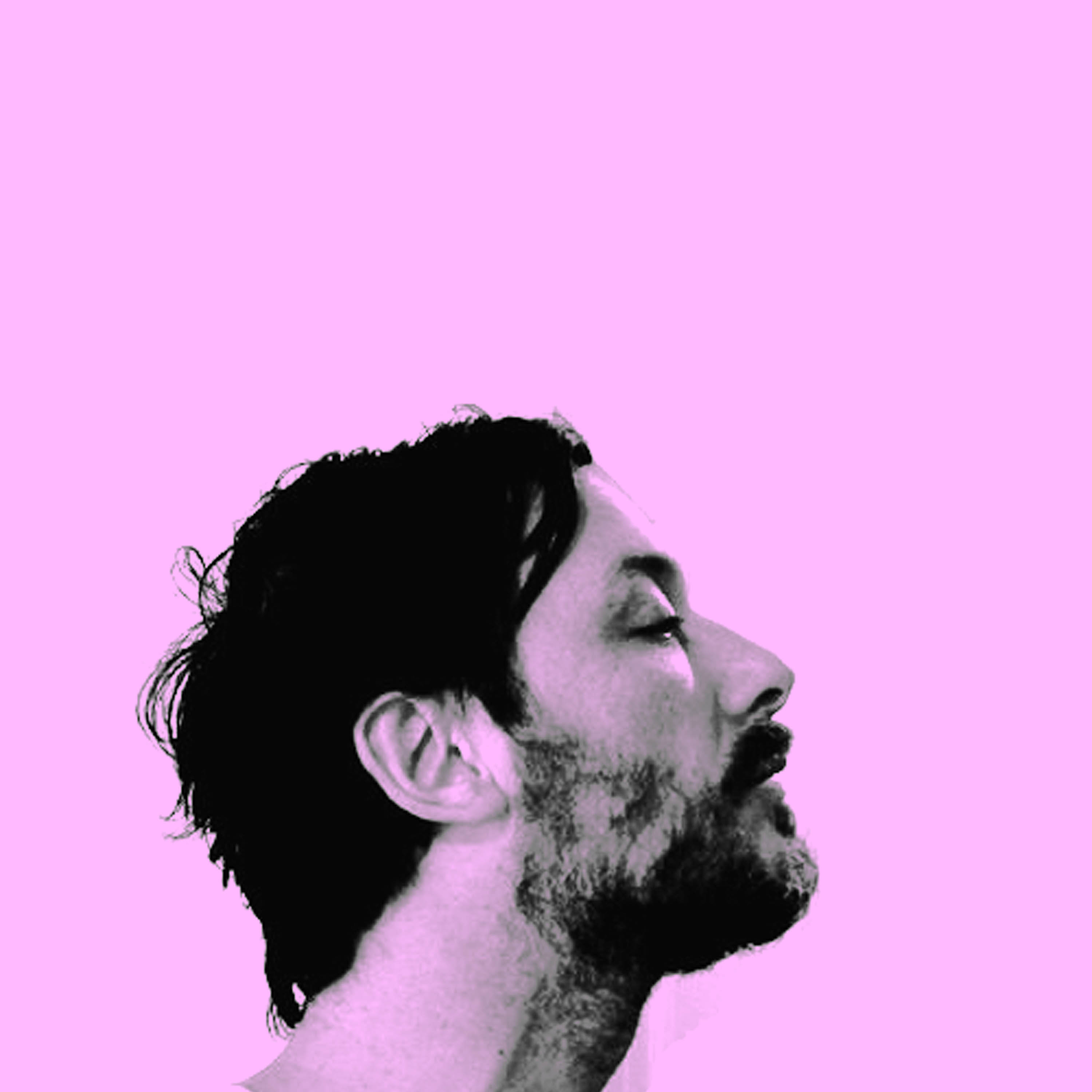
Bozidar Brazda

== Biography ==
Bozidar Brazda is a Canadian-born, New York-based artist. He is the son of folk musician Andrew Brazda and the grandson of the award-winning journalist Andrej Brázda-Jankovský. He has exhibited at MoMA and The Whitney Museum.

Parallel to his visual art and writing practices, Brazda plays in the post-punk band Diet Choke with model and singer Ruby Aldridge and artist Shawn Kuruneru. In 2023 he co-wrote the track “Bad Days” with Julian Casablancas and Promiseland.

== Work and exhibitions ==
Brazda's work consists of silk screens, wall texts, silicone rubber on canvas, and audio recordings. In recent years the artist has moved away from his earlier East/West "narrative-driven" installations to a minimalist Pop Art that reflects his interest in the 'edges of popular culture'.

Bozidar Brazda has exhibited at international museums and galleries including the Whitney Museum of American Art (NY), MoMA PS1 (NY), The Kitchen (NY), David Zwirner Gallery, Reena Spaulings (NY), and Martos (NY).

His work has appeared in Artforum, Flash Art, artnet.com, The New York Times, Architectural Digest (France), Art in America, Interview Magazine, Vogue.com, and Maximum Rock N Roll.

He has written for artnet.com, Flash Art, and dazed.com.
