= Matt Keegan =

New York-based artist

Matt Keegan (Manhasset, NY) is a visual artist working across disciplines including sculpture, photography, printmaking, video, and independent publishing. Keegan's work is conceptual and multi-faceted, and it often involves the intersection of language and image, as well as collaboration. He lives and works in Brooklyn, NY.

== Education ==
Keegan received his BFA from Carnegie Mellon University in 1998. In 2001 he attended Skowhegan School of Painting and Sculpture, and in 2004 received his MFA from Columbia University.

== Work ==
Matt Keegan's work deals with both language and conversation among people, materials, circumstances, sites, and histories. Keegan's keen interest in publications has manifested itself in many different ways, and he's produced many collaborations made in dialogue with other artists, writers, and thinkers.

== Exhibitions ==
Keegan had his first solo exhibition, Any Day Now at D'Amelio Terras in New York, NY in 2007.

The artist has had solo exhibitions at Participant Inc. in New York, NY (2017) and the Carpenter Center for the Visual Arts in Cambridge, MA (2017). He had a two-person show with Kay Rosen that traveled from the Grazer Kunstverein in Graz, Austria to the Contemporary Arts Museum in Houston, TX (2016). Additional solo exhibitions include Altman Siegel Gallery in San Francisco, CA (2009, 2011, 2015), D'Amelio Terras Gallery in New York, NY (2007, 2009, 2011), Rogaland Kunstsenter in Stavanger, Norway (2015), Galeria Pedro Cera in Lisbon, Portugal (2013), and Anna Helwing Gallery in Los Angeles, CA (2008).

His work has appeared in many notable group exhibitions including The Artist's Museum at the Institute of Contemporary Art in Boston, MA (2016), The Sun Placed in the Abyss in Columbus, OH (2016), Reconstructions: Recent Photographs and Video from the Met Collection at the Metropolitan Museum of Art in New York, NY (2015-2016), Storylines: Contemporary Art at the Guggenheim at the Solomon R. Guggenheim Museum in New York, NY (2015), Found in Translation at the Deutsche Guggenheim, Berlin, Germany (2012), The Generational: Younger Than Jesus at the New Museum, New York, NY (2009).

He is currently represented by Altman Siegel Gallery in San Francisco, CA.

== Books and publications ==
Keegan co-founded North Drive Press with Lizzy Lee in 2003, an annual art publication which produced five editions from 2004-2010. In 2012 he founded EqualInfo. The first edition was published that same year by mfc-michéle didier. The second edition was published by Capricious in 2014.

=== Books ===
- Matt Keegan: OR. Stavanger, Norway: Rogaland Kunstsenter, New York: Inventory Press (2015).
- Matt Keegan: AMERICAMERICA. New York: Printed Matter (2008).

== Public collections ==
- The Alfond Collection of Contemporary Art at Rollins College, Winter Park, FL
- Solomon R. Guggenheim Museum, New York, NY
- The Metropolitan Museum of Art, New York, NY
- Annette and Peter Nobel Collection, Zurich
- Frances Young Tang Teaching Museum and Art Gallery, Skidmore, NY
- Whitney Museum of American Art, New York, NY
