= Michael Glover (author) =

Michael Glover (born Sheffield, Yorkshire) is an author, London-based poet, art critic, fiction writer and magazine editor.

== Education ==
Michael Glover was educated at Firth Park Grammar School and read English at Queens' College, Cambridge.

== Career ==
Glover is the Poetry Editor of The Tablet and a senior art critic and feature writer for The Independent. He has been a regular reviewer and commentator upon the world of poetry for The Times, the New Statesman and The Economist. He has written about poetry in performance for the Financial Times. He is also a London correspondent for ArtNews, New York City. In 2009 he established The Bow-Wow Shop, a free-to-access, online poetry magazine which has been archived by the British Library.

He wrote the Headlong Into Pennilessness memoir about growing up in a working-class suburb of Sheffield in the 1950s. Sebastian Barker, former chairman of the Poetry Society and Fellow of the Royal Society of Literature, called it "charming and fascinating". Bill Hamilton, literary agent of author Hilary Mantel, describes it as a "vivid and true" picture of the kinds of life endured by tens of thousands of working-class families struggling to make ends meet in Northern Britain in the post-war austerity years.

== Poetry collections ==
- Measured Lives (Dagger Press, 1994)
- Impossible Horizons (Sinclair-Stevenson, 1995)
- A Small Modicum of Folly (Dagger Press, 1997)
- The Bead-Eyed Man (Dagger Press, 1999)
- Amidst All This Debris (Dagger Press, 2001)
- For The Sheer Hell Of Living (San Marco Press, 2008)
- Only So Much (Savage Poets Collective, 2011)
- Hypothetical May Morning (1889 books, 2018)
- Messages to Federico (1889 books, 2018)

== Other works ==
- Headlong into Pennilessness (ACM Retro, 2011)
- Great Works: Encounters with Art (Prestel, 2016)
- Playing Out in the Wireless Days (1889 Books, 2017)
- 111 Places in Sheffield You Should Not Miss (Emons, 2017)
- Late Days (1889 Books, 2018)
