= 44th Venice Biennale =

- Genre: Art exhibition
- Begins: 1990
- Ends: 1990
- Location: Venice
- Country: Italy
- Previous event: 43rd Venice Biennale (1988)
- Next event: 45th Venice Biennale (1993)

The 44th Venice Biennale, held in 1990, was an exhibition of international contemporary art, with 49 participating nations. The Venice Biennale takes place biennially in Venice, Italy. Prizewinners of the 44th Biennale included: Giovanni Anselmo and Bernd and Hilla Becher (International Prize/Golden Lions), the American pavilion with Jenny Holzer (best national representation), and Anish Kapoor (best young artist).

== Awards ==
- International Prize: Golden Lion – Giovanni Anselmo; Golden Lion for sculpture – Bernd and Hilla Becher
- Golden Lion for best national representation: American pavilion with Jenny Holzer
- Premio 2000 (young artist): Anish Kapoor
- Premia (purchase) of the Cassa di Risparmio di Venezia: Giuseppe Pulvirenti

== Bibliography ==
- Di Martino, Enzo (2005). The History of the Venice Biennale 1895–2005. Venice: Papiro Arte. ISBN 978-88-901104-4-3. OCLC 62237064.
