= Dianna Molzan =

American painter

- Born: 1972 (age 53–54); Tacoma, Washington
- Known for: Visual Art

Dianna Molzan (born 1972) is an American contemporary artist and painter based in Los Angeles. Thus far in her career, she is known for exploring the relationship between painting and sculpture through deconstruction and materialization of traditional painting materials and tools.

Molzan is an adjunct Professor of Visual Art at the UCLA School of Arts and Architecture at the University of California, Los Angeles.

Molzan's paintings are often considered as more of a three-dimensional object than a two dimensional surfaces on the wall. Referred to as carrying a sculptural quality, Molzan's paintings are grounded within the practice of painting through the materials she uses, such as oil paints, canvas, linen, and canvas frame.

Molzan's pieces consist of a process of deconstruction of the traditional elements of painting, which are then recombined into a new composition. She creates a juxtaposition between the mediums of sculpture and painting through the alteration of the physical state of the canvas.

Molzan's work is associated with the techniques of impressionism, abstract expressionism, and minimalism.

== Biography ==
Dianna Molzan was born in 1972 in Tacoma, Washington. She earned her Bachelor of Fine Arts from the School of the Art Institute of Chicago in 2001 and also attended the Universität der Künste in Berlin. She received her Masters of Fine Arts from the University of Southern California, writing her senior thesis, How the Frame was One, on the development both theoretical and symbolic framing devices within art, primarily focusing on two works: Georges Seurat's La Grande Jatte (1884) and Eva Hesse's Hang Up (1966). Her first solo exhibition was at Overduin and Kite, Los Angeles, in 2009.

Molzan's solo exhibition at the Whitney Museum of American Art titled "Bologna Meissen" in 2011 was her first solo museum exhibition and debut in New York. According to the Whitney Museum, Molzan "uses a variety of material approaches that differ from one work to the next, each painting exhibits a subtle precision in its intention and execution. Although she works with traditional materials, such as oil on linen, she approaches her canvases irreverently, invoking elements of fashion, the decorative arts, ceramics, and popular design." Molzan chose the title for "Bologna Meissen" because of "two cities that are the origins of two of [Molzan's] biggest influences—Bologna, Italy, for the painter Giorgio Morandi and Meissen, Germany, for Meissen porcelain ware."

In conversation with curator Margot Norton of the Whitney Museum, Molzan states, " I limit myself to traditional painting materials because I want to show that it isn’t the materials that have changed over the centuries, but the thinking about the materials and the philosophy behind their application. Oil paint and linen and the wooden support are all inherited materials that date back to the Renaissance and continue through modernism and all the other styles of painting that are radically different from one another but use the same stuff. I love that I can paint-splatter a canvas and make it look like hard plastic by using more or less the same materials Rousseau used to depict the forest of Fontainebleau in the nineteenth century."
