= Christopher Knight (art critic) =

American art critic

Christopher Knight is an American art critic. A journalist, he wrote for the Los Angeles Herald Examiner from 1980 to 1989 and for the Los Angeles Times from 1989 to 2025.

Knight was awarded the 2020 Pulitzer Prize for Criticism, after being a three-time finalist (1991, 2001 and 2007). Also in 2020 he became the second writer to receive the Lifetime Achievement Award for Art Journalism from the Dorothy and Leo Rabkin Foundation. Knight received the 1997 Frank Jewett Mather Award for Distinction in Art Criticism from the College Art Association, the first journalist to win the award in more than 25 years. He won the National Arts & Entertainment Journalism Award for art criticism in 1999, 2020, 2021 and 2025.

Knight was born in Westfield, Massachusetts, in 1950, son of the late Richard A. and Alyce M. Knight. He has two siblings, Linda and Richard Jr. Knight has been married since 1980 (legally since 2013) to Fernando Muscat Sarthou, and lives in Rancho Mirage, California, and San Miguel de Allende, Mexico.

Prior to becoming a journalist, Knight was assistant director for public information at the Los Angeles County Museum of Art (1979–1980) and curator at the Museum of Contemporary Art, San Diego (1976–1979). In 1974-75 he was an NEA/Ketcham Fellow at the Toldeo Museum of Art in Ohio. In 1982 his appointment at the New York Times was blocked by an editor who objected to hiring a gay man. From 1986 to 1989 he also served as a program advisor to the Lannan Foundation with Museum of Modern Art curator John Elderfield and art collector and philanthropist Gifford Philips. Knight retired from the Los Angeles Times in November 2025 after 36 years at the paper.

In 1999 Knight was awarded an Honorary Doctor of Fine Arts degree from the Atlanta College of Art. He received his master's degree in art history from the State University of New York in 1976, and was named Distinguished Alumnus of Hartwick College (Oneonta, New York) in 1999.

Knight has appeared on CBS' 60 Minutes, PBS' Newshour, NPR's Morning Edition, All Things Considered and CNN, and he was featured in The Art of the Steal, the 2009 documentary on the Barnes Foundation in Philadelphia. He is the author of two books: Last Chance for Eden: Selected Art Criticism, 1979-1994, published in 1995 by Art Issues Press, and Art of the Sixties and Seventies: The Panza Collection, published by Rizzoli in 1989 and reissued in 2003.
