= Katherine Bernhardt =

American artist (born 1975)

Katherine Bernhardt (born 1975; Clayton, Missouri) is an American artist based in St. Louis, Missouri.

== Work and career ==
Bernhardt received her MFA from the School of Visual Arts, New York, and her Bachelor of Fine Arts (BFA) from the School of the Art Institute of Chicago, Illinois.

Bernhardt is known for painting consumer symbols, tropical animals, and every day objects over bright flat fields of color in an expressionistic and almost abstract style. Previous bodies of work include Moroccan rug-inspired paintings and collages made in collaborations with her (now ex)husband Youssef Jdia, as well as her "model" paintings, which were loose portraits based on images of supermodels from high fashion magazines.

Bernhardt has also been involved in numerous collaborations within the art and fashion industries. In 2015, Bernhardt was one of five artists asked to contribute to W Magazine's annual "Art Issue" featuring artwork inspired by rapper Drake. Bernhardt also produced a in-store installation in a New York City Chanel location for the launch of the J-12 watch. She has also collaborated with Flaunt magazine, EDUN, and Miss Sixty.

== Exhibitions ==
Katherine Bernhardt's work has been exhibited internationally since 2000. She has been included in both solo and group shows with galleries such as CANADA, the Hole, Team Gallery, VENUS, China Art Objects Galleries, V1 Gallery, Gavin Brown's Enterprise and Xavier Hufkens.

== Publications ==
Bernhardt, Katherine, et al. The Magnificent Excess of Snoop Dogg – Katherine Bernhardt. PictureBox, 2008.
