= Pinchas Burstein =

Polish-born Jewish post-expressionist painter

Maryan
- Born: Pinchas Burstein; 1 January 1927; Nowy Sącz, Poland
- Died: 15 June 1977 (aged 50); New York City, United States
- Known for: painting
- Movement: post-expressionism

Pinchas Burstein (1927–1977), later known as Maryan S. Maryan, was a Polish-born Jewish post-expressionist painter. He was born in Nowy Sącz, Poland, into an Orthodox Jewish family and was only 12 when the Nazis invaded Poland in 1939. Burstein was subsequently captured by the Nazis and imprisoned at Auschwitz concentration camp. After Poland was liberated by the Soviet army in 1945, Burstein was the sole survivor of his family and required a leg amputation due the injuries sustained while at the concentration camp. In the aftermath of the war, he spent two years in displaced persons camps in Germany.

In 1947, Burstein moved to Mandatory Palestine, where he faced challenges due to his disability and briefly lived in a kibbutz. He later attended the Bezalel Academy of Art and Design in Jerusalem and witnessed the 1948 Arab–Israeli War. In 1950, Burstein relocated to Paris, adopting the name Maryan Bergman, and enrolled at the École nationale supérieure des Beaux-Arts where he studied with the French avant-garde artist Fernand Léger. His artistic career flourished in Paris, where he received a commission to design the Monument to the Unknown Jewish Martyr and was awarded the Prix des Critiques d’Art in 1959.

In 1962, after being denied French citizenship, he moved to New York City, where he continued to paint, creating an extensive body of work that included his best-known Personnage paintings series. His figurative style, often violent and exaggerated, reflected the influence of Pablo Picasso, Jean Dubuffet, and the CoBrA group. In 1971, following a mental breakdown, he produced a series of drawings depicting his life story, which have since been interpreted as the artist's response to the traumatic experiences of living through the Holocaust. In 1975, he co-created a film titled Ecce Homo, a blend of performance art and historical imagery. Maryan died of a heart attack in 1977 at the Hotel Chelsea in New York, which is where he was living at the time, and was buried at Montparnasse Cemetery Paris.

== Early life ==
My name is Maryan S. Maryan. I was born in Nowy Sącz 1.1.1927 … I was sent to summer camps with many other kids from all over Poland. It was close to my hometown. We used to say to each other: next year same place... the following year instead of summer colonies I found myself at Auschwitz.

— Maryan

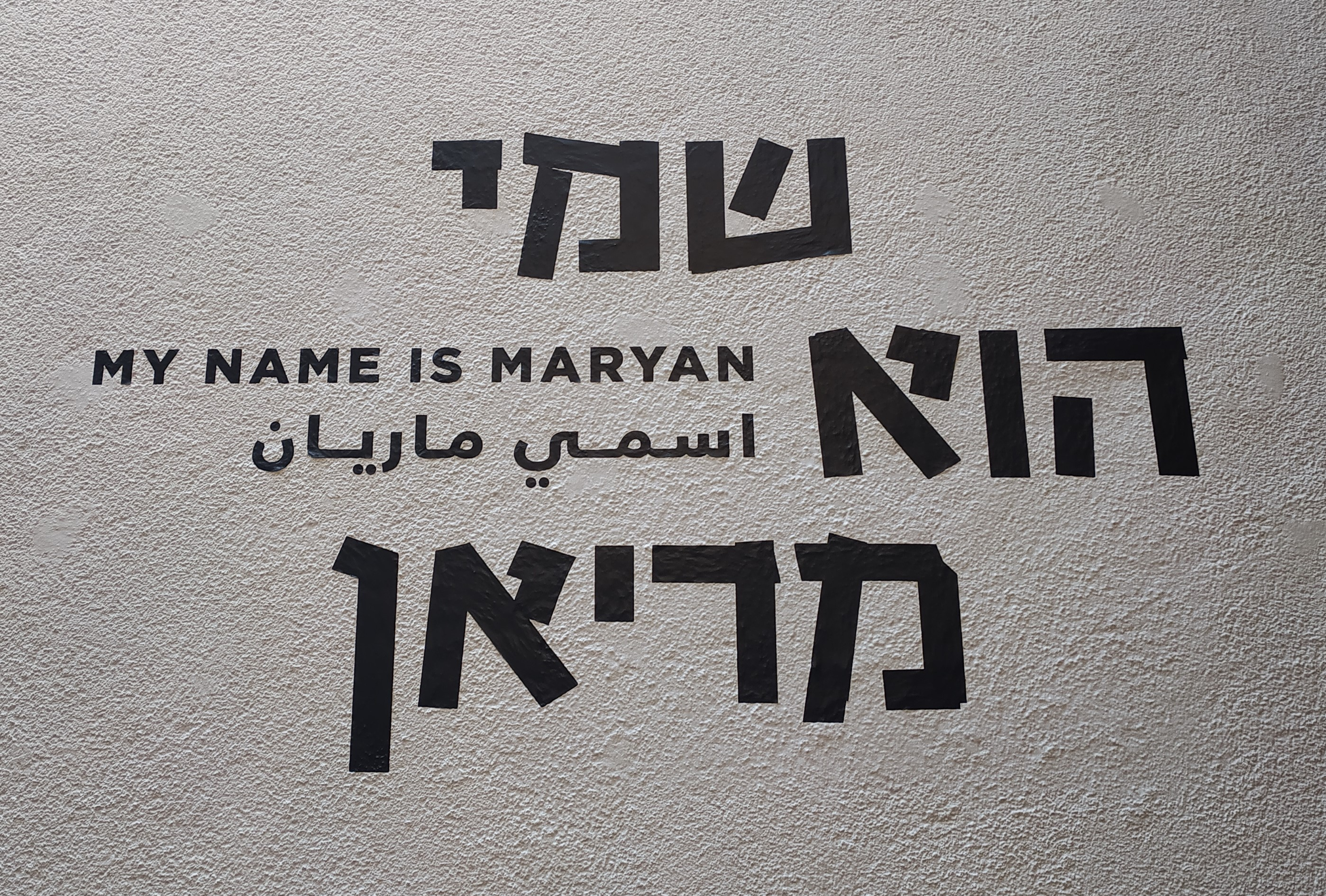
"My Name Is Maryan", 2022-2023 exhibition at the Tel Aviv Museum of Art

Pinchas Burstein (Pinkas Bursztyn) was born in Nowy Sącz, Poland, on January 1, 1927, the second son of an Orthodox Jewish family. His mother was Gitel Burstein; his father, Avraham Schindel, was a baker. Burstein was 12 when the Nazis invaded Poland in 1939. He lived in the Rzeszów Ghetto in 1942–1943, in which period he was shot in the neck while delivering food to Jews in hiding. In 1943 or 1944 he was sent to the Auschwitz concentration camp and worked in Gleiwitz. Burstein was given the inmate number A17986. On the night of his arrival he was chosen as one of 22 Jews who were to be shot, but survived. In 1945, when the Soviet army liberated prisoners of the Auschwitz death camp, Burstein was found "wounded among bodies in a lime pit", and had his leg amputated. After the war, in 1946, he left Poland and spent two years in Germany in camps for displaced persons. Burstein was the only member of his family to survive the Holocaust.

== Palestine, Israel and France ==
In 1947 Burstein moved to Palestine. In a later interview he said that he had been persuaded to move there while in a displaced persons camp, but once he arrived, found himself labeled "handicapped" and sent to a kibbutz that had "a residence for elderly and disabled immigrants".

After I received the certificate, they left me alone on the platform. No one came to me. I found a pile of oranges and sat on it. I waited. Yes, I waited for someone to come and take me to the kibbutz, as that official had promised me. I waited for several hours and suddenly I was horrified. I began to see the truth. No one was waiting for me. This clerk, his name will be omitted, lied to me. They left me on the platform. After a while I realized that it was worse than a concentration camp, because I was not alone there, we went to die together, whereas on the platform at the port of Haifa I went to die alone.

He left that kibbutz after five months, when he was admitted in the Bezalel Academy of Art and Design in Jerusalem. He saw the 1948 Palestine war and creation of the state of Israel, and witnessed Battle for Jerusalem. His first solo exhibition was at the YMCA in Jerusalem. In 1950 Burstein arrived in Paris, where he studied at the École nationale supérieure des Beaux-Arts for three years, including two in the lithography workshop. While at the academy, Burstein studied with the French avant-garde artist Fernand Léger.

In Paris Pinchas Burstein took a new name, Maryan Bergman, "which he "borrowed" from his schoolmate in Bezalel, the painter Marian (Meir Marinel), who committed suicide a few years later." There, he had works included in several major exhibitions and was commissioned to design a tapestry for the Monument to the Unknown Jewish Martyr in Paris, and was awarded the Prix des Critiques d’Art at the Paris Biennale. His first solo exhibition in the United States was held at the famed André Emmerich Gallery in 1960.

== USA ==
Most of the things written about me are empty of content. They also say that I am a bad person (this is also true). As for my paintings, I officially declare that I would call them true paintings.

— Maryan

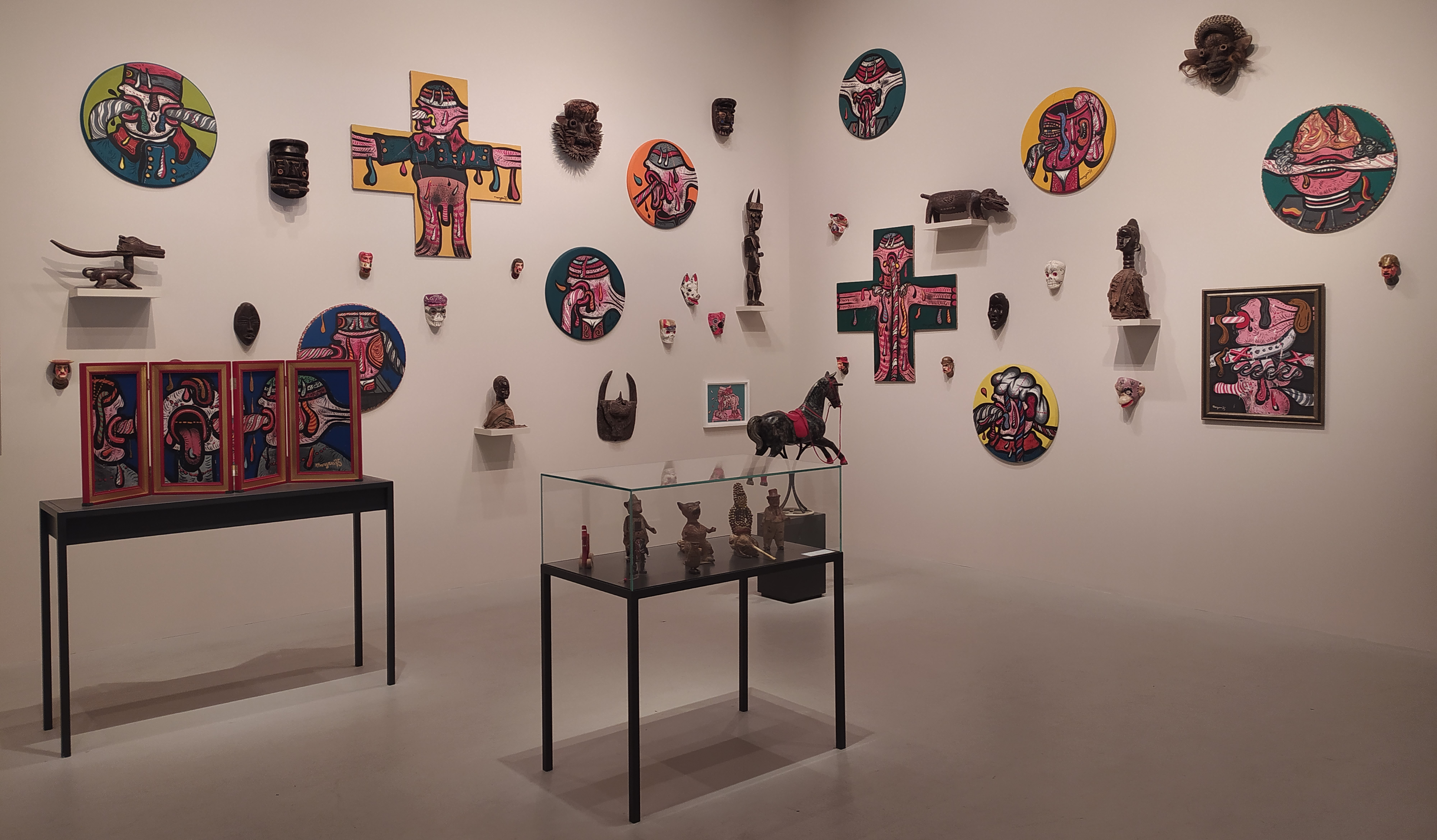
Exhibition room designed after Maryan's room in New York hotel. 2022-2023 exhibition at the Tel Aviv Museum of Art

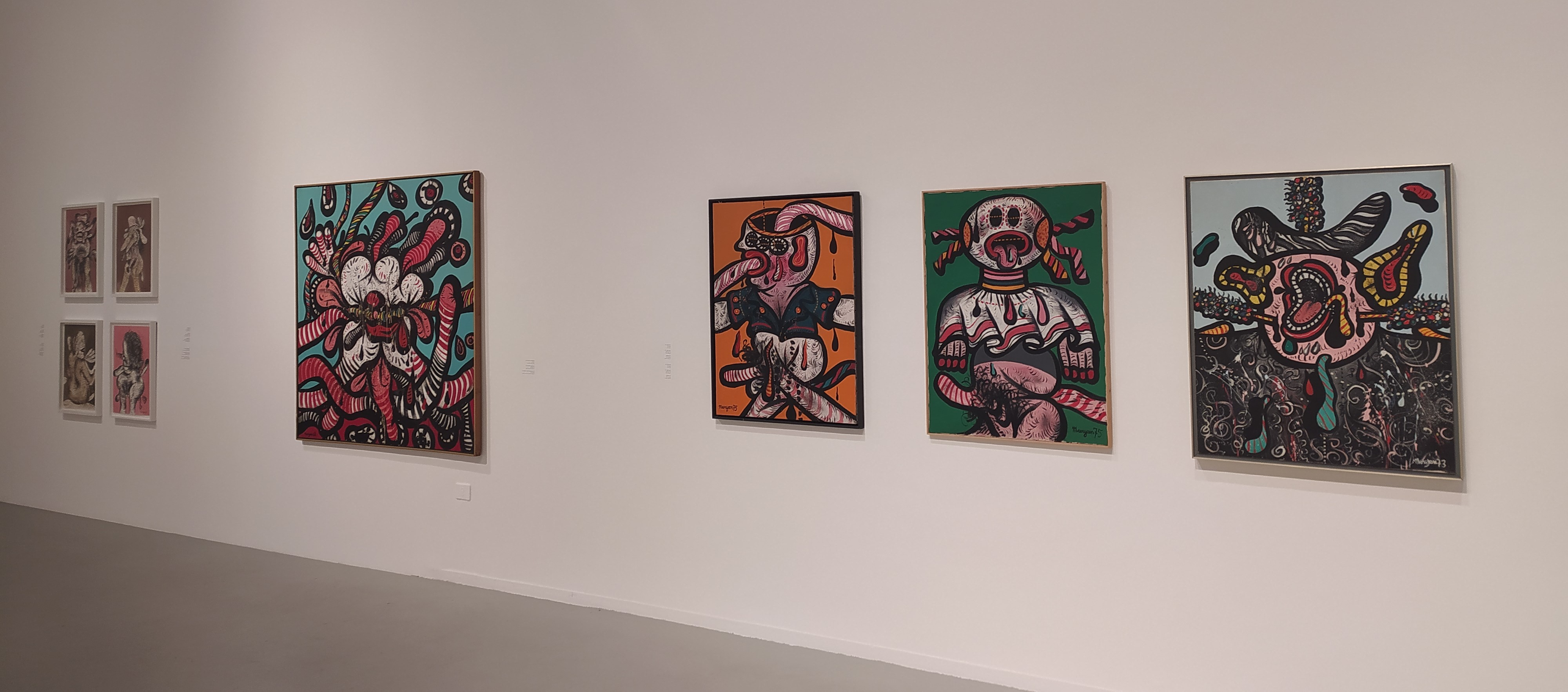
Maryan's Personnages, Tel Aviv Museum of Art

Maryan moved to New York in 1962, after being denied French citizenship. Together with his wife, Annette, a Holocaust survivor he met in France, he arrived in the USA aboard the SS Leonardo da Vinci. In 1969 he received American citizenship and officially changed his name to Maryan S. Maryan.

His best-known works, the movie Ecce Homo, the painting After Goia, and a series of paintings called Personnage, were done in New York. The Personnage paintings were described by Grace Glueck as

brutal, exaggerated Piccasoid forms in which could be seen the influence also of Dubuffet and the CoBrA group of young European painters that included Karel Appel and Asger Jorn. They were mocking, clownish zombies with mask-like faces and lolling tongues, suggesting visual realizations of characters from Gunter Grass's Tin Drum. Later, they got wider and more gestural, with maybe a touch of de Kooning, winding up as slobbering, almost illegible bundles of mouths, flailing limbs, and flying organs.

In 1971 Maryan had a mental breakdown, and temporarily lost his ability to speak. To overcome this state, his psychiatrist told him to draw depictions of his life story. In a year he created a series of drawings, later titled Ecce homo, and completed 9 notebooks with 478 drawings, each 20x30 cm. Daniel Kupermann examined these drawings as a psychoanalyst, and found them to be a "blend of infantile and monstrous, with their incontinent bodies and with the omnipresence of death in the form of grotesque terror-filled faces, seem to reveal an attempt to find a language in images that is able to transmit the experience of the obscene tragedy lived by the inmates of concentration camps".

In 1975 Maryan and Kenny Schneider created a 90-minute film, also titled Ecce homo, in his hotel. Katarzyna Bojarska describes the film as

a series of staged recollections where photographic images and reproductions of Maryan’s paintings, drawings, and lithographs alternate with a disturbing performance. Maryan reenacts Holocaust memories with the use of numerous accessories such as an M16 gun, dummies of SS officers, a straitjacket, ropes, and paint. The film opens with the following sequences of images appearing one after another: the Virgin Mary, women in robes during a Ku-Klux-Klan ceremony, Maryan himself in a black dress resembling a cassock with his arms stretched wide (as if crucified), Yasser Arafat, the Pope on a stool, images of crucifixion, a black cloth with a white swastika on it, black crosses on the white robes of Ku-Klux-Klan members, the shooting of Maryan as a Nazi, black tape covers his eyes and mouth, then pictures of Pinochet, Napoleon, Maximilian Kolbe (with the camp number 214510672 on his chest), piles of corpses from the Mỹ Lai massacre, Christ in a crown of thorns covered in paint. Religious motifs, iconic images of historical events and people, press clips and holy images are all montaged in a sequence that stimulates imagination and affect, driving both to the very limits of alarm.

Maryan lived in the Chelsea Hotel in New York. He died of a heart attack in his hotel room in 1977, and was buried in the Montparnasse cemetery in Paris.
