= Allan Frumkin =

American art dealer (1927–2002)

Allan Frumkin (1927–2002) was an American art dealer with galleries in Chicago and New York City in the second half of the 20th century.

== Life and career ==
Frumkin was born in Chicago in 1927. He attended public schools and graduated from the University of Chicago. He studied the sociology of architecture briefly at Cornell University and The New School for Social Research in New York City.

Frumkin opened the Allan Frumkin Gallery in Chicago in 1952 and a gallery with the same name in New York City in 1959. In 1979 he joined forces with William Struve and the Chicago gallery was renamed Frumkin-Struve, before closing in 1980. The New York gallery was renamed Frumkin/Adams in 1988. Frumkin retired and closed the New York gallery in 1995 but continued to work as a private art dealer for most of the rest of his life.

"In the early 1950s, his Chicago gallery was instrumental in introducing the European Surrealists." He promoted the work of Henri Matisse, Max Beckmann, Robert Arneson and Richard Diebenkorn, among others. Beginning in 1976 and lasting for 31 issues, Frumkin published a newsletter with profiles of gallery artists in their studios.

He was also an art collector—382 of his Beckmann prints were donated to the Saint Louis Art Museum in December 2002.

== Personal life ==
Frumkin was married to Jean Martin Frumkin, who died in 2019.

== Legacy ==
The Allan Frumkin Gallery records are housed at the Smithsonian Archives of American Art.

A professorship "to provide high-level interdisciplinary scholarship on the connections between visual arts and society" was established at the University of Chicago in 2005, through a $3 million gift from Frumkin's family. The faculty chair is named the Allan and Jean Frumkin Professorship in the Visual Arts in the Committee on Social Thought.
