= Rutgers Computer and Technology Law Journal =

- Discipline: Law Journal, Computers, Technology
- Language: English

Publication details
- Former names: Rutgers Journal of Computers, Technology, and the Law
- History: 1969–present
- Frequency: Biannually
- ISO 4: Find out here

Links
- Journal homepage

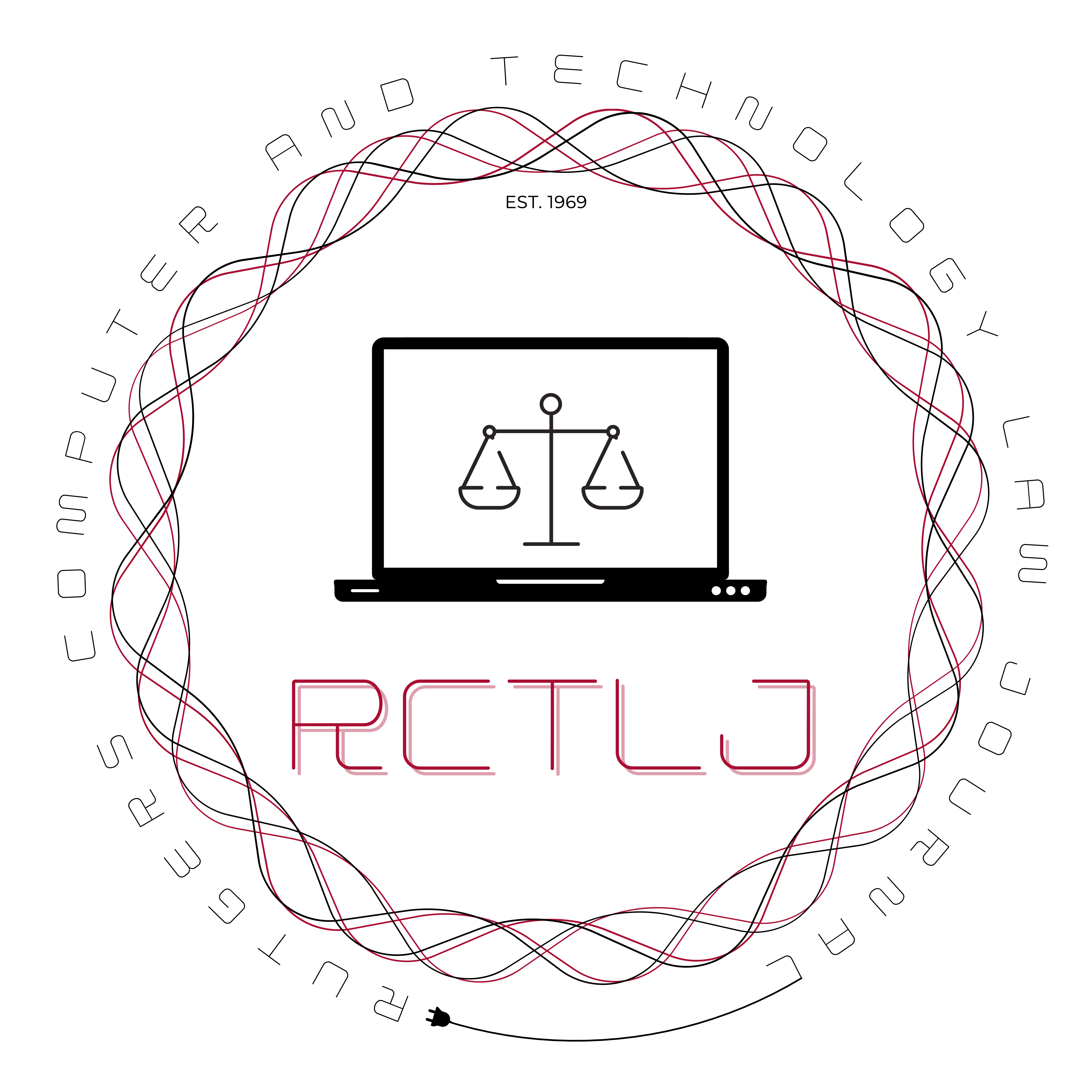
RCTLJ's logo

The Rutgers Computer and Technology Law Journal is an academic law journal established in 1969 at Rutgers School of Law–Newark. The journal covers the intersection of law and technology, and is the longest-standing academic journal to do so. The journal is a student-run, law review–style publication, and publishes two issues each academic year. The journal's editorial staff is selected through a writing competition held at the end of Rutgers Law School students' 1L year.
