= List of Guggenheim Fellowships awarded in 2012 =

List of Guggenheim Fellowships awarded in 2012: Guggenheim Fellowships have been awarded annually since 1925, by the John Simon Guggenheim Memorial Foundation to those "who have demonstrated exceptional capacity for productive scholarship or exceptional creative ability in the arts."

Fellow	Category	Field of Study
John Aldrich	Social Sciences	Political Science
Ellen Altfest	Creative Arts	Fine Arts
Tonio Andrade	Humanities	European and Latin American History
Michael Arcega	Creative Arts	Fine Arts
Eve Aschheim	Creative Arts	Fine Arts
Elizabeth B. Barrett	Creative Arts	Photography
Faith E. Beasley	Humanities	European and Latin American History
Alison Bechdel	Creative Arts	General Nonfiction
Louise Belcourt	Creative Arts	Fine Arts
Catherine L. Besteman	Social Sciences	Anthropology & Cultural Studies
Nayland Blake	Creative Arts	Fine Arts
Adam Bock	Creative Arts	Drama & Performance Art
Peter Bogardus	Creative Arts	Photography
Stephen R. Bokenkamp	Social Sciences	East Asian Studies
John R. Bowen	Social Sciences	Anthropology & Cultural Studies
Teresa Caldeira	Humanities	Architecture, Planning & Design
John Carlson	Natural Sciences	Neuroscience
Lucien Castaing-Taylor	Creative Arts	Film-Video
Juan William Chavez	Creative Arts	Fine Arts
Tom Cipullo	Creative Arts	Music Composition
Peter U. Clark	Natural Sciences	Earth Science
Dawn Clements	Creative Arts	Fine Arts
John H. Cochrane	Social Sciences	Economics
Katharine Coles	Creative Arts	Poetry
Jeff Colson	Creative Arts	Fine Arts
Matt Connors	Creative Arts	Fine Arts
Olivia Remie Constable	Humanities	Medieval and Renaissance History
Lisa Crafts	Creative Arts	Film-Video
Cherien Dabis	Creative Arts	Film-Video
Kwame Dawes	Creative Arts	Poetry
Jacci Den Hartog	Creative Arts	Fine Arts
Stephen DiRado	Creative Arts	Photography
Sheperd S. Doeleman	Natural Sciences	Astronomy-Astrophysics
Dornith Doherty	Creative Arts	Photography
Timothy Donnelly	Creative Arts	Poetry
Shimon Dotan	Creative Arts	Film-Video
James N. Druckman	Social Sciences	Political Science
Douglas DuBois	Creative Arts	Photography
John Dufresne	Creative Arts	Fiction
Eric Dyer	Creative Arts	Film-Video
Laura F. Edwards	Social Sciences	Law
Jamal J. Elias	Humanities	Near Eastern Studies
Doug Elkins	Creative Arts	Choreography
Alice Elliott	Creative Arts	Film-Video
Steven Epstein	Social Sciences	Sociology
Judith Evans Grubbs	Humanities	Classics
Wendy Ewald	Creative Arts	Photography
Charles Fairbanks	Creative Arts	Film-Video
Fang Man	Creative Arts	Music Composition
Margot E. Fassler	Humanities	Medieval and Renaissance Literature
Douglas Flamming	Humanities	United States History
Ruth Franklin	Creative Arts	Biography
Vivian Fung	Creative Arts	Music Composition
Peter Galassi	Humanities	Photography Studies
Michael Galinsky	Creative Arts	Film-Video
Chitra Ganesh	Creative Arts	Fine Arts
Stavros Garoufalidis	Natural Sciences	Mathematics
Kambiz GhaneaBassiri	Humanities	Religion
Kristen R. Ghodsee	Social Sciences	Anthropology & Cultural Studies
Denise Gigante	Humanities	English Literature
Jane Gillooly	Creative Arts	Film-Video
Lori D. Ginzberg	Humanities	United States History
Ellis Goldberg	Humanities	Near Eastern Studies
John Gossage	Creative Arts	Photography
Barbara Gowdy	Creative Arts	Fiction
Kathleen Graber	Creative Arts	Poetry
Bruce Grant	Social Sciences	Anthropology & Cultural Studies
Eliza Griswold	Creative Arts	General Nonfiction
Daron Aric Hagen	Creative Arts	Music Composition
Stephen S. Hall	Natural Sciences	Science Writing
David J. Hancock	Creative Arts	Biography
Trajal Harrell	Creative Arts	Choreography
Andrea K. Henderson	Humanities	English Literature
Dagmar Herzog	Humanities	Intellectual & Cultural History
Tamar Herzog	Social Sciences	European and Latin American History
Charles Hinman	Creative Arts	Fine Arts
Jennifer S. Hirsch	Natural Sciences	Medicine & Health
Huck Hodge	Creative Arts	Music Composition
Scott A. Hughes	Natural Sciences	Physics
Nina G. Jablonski	Social Sciences	Anthropology & Cultural Studies
James B. Jacobs	Social Sciences	Law
Bill Jacobson	Creative Arts	Photography
Adrian Johns	Humanities	Intellectual & Cultural History
Kent Jones	Humanities	Film, Video, & Radio Studies
Matthew L. Jones	Humanities	History of Science, Technology, and Economics
Stanya Kahn	Creative Arts	Film-Video
James Kaplan	Creative Arts	General Nonfiction
Nets Katz	Natural Sciences	Mathematics
Arnold J. Kemp	Creative Arts	Fine Arts
Robert P. Kirshner	Natural Sciences	Physics
Alexander Kiselev	Natural Sciences	Applied Mathematics
Don Kulick	Social Sciences	Anthropology & Cultural Studies
Jonathan Lamb	Humanities	English Literature
Susan Landau	Natural Sciences	Computer Science
Laura Landweber	Natural Sciences	Organismic Biology & Ecology
Melissa Lane	Humanities	Classics
John Jota Leaños	Creative Arts	Film-Video
Janna Levin	Natural Sciences	Science Writing
Robert S. Levine	Humanities	American Literature
Lisa A. Lindsay	Humanities	United States History
William Luis	Humanities	European and Latin American Literature
Peter Maass	Creative Arts	General Nonfiction
Thomas F. Madden	Humanities	Medieval and Renaissance History
Keeril Makan	Creative Arts	Music Composition
Sarah Manguso	Creative Arts	General Nonfiction
James C. McCann	Humanities	History of Science, Technology, and Economics
Justin McDaniel	Humanities	Religion
Pablo Medina	Creative Arts	Poetry
Jodi Melnick	Creative Arts	Choreography
Christia Mercer	Humanities	Philosophy
Joseph Millar	Creative Arts	Poetry
Lydia Millet	Creative Arts	Fiction
Alex Mincek	Creative Arts	Music Composition
Alan Mintz	Humanities	Literary Criticism
Jim Moore	Creative Arts	Poetry
Brighde Mullins	Creative Arts	Drama & Performance Art
Laure Murat	Humanities	Intellectual & Cultural History
Eileen Myles	Creative Arts	General Nonfiction
Ron Nagle	Creative Arts	Fine Arts
Luay Nakhleh	Natural Sciences	Organismic Biology & Ecology
Benjamin Nathans	Humanities	European and Latin American History
Haruko Nishimura	Creative Arts	Choreography
Alva Noë	Humanities	Philosophy
Wura-Natasha Ogunji	Creative Arts	Film-Video
Carol J. Oja	Humanities	Music and Dance Research
Richard Olmstead	Natural Sciences	Plant Sciences
Lance Olsen	Creative Arts	Fiction
Judith Pascoe	Creative Arts	General Nonfiction
Arthur Phillips	Creative Arts	Fiction
Donald Ray Pollock	Creative Arts	Fiction
Bobby Previte	Creative Arts	Music Composition
Lia Purpura	Creative Arts	General Nonfiction
Asifa Quraishi-Landes	Social Sciences	Constitutional Studies
Naufus Ramirez-Figueroa	Creative Arts	Fine Arts
James E. Rauch	Social Sciences	Economics
Lauren Redniss	Creative Arts	General Nonfiction
Jennifer Wynne Reeves	Creative Arts	Fine Arts
Elisha P. Renne	Humanities	African Studies
Joan Richardson	Creative Arts	General Nonfiction
Yoruba Richen	Creative Arts	Film-Video
J.T. Rogers	Creative Arts	Drama & Performance Art
David A. Rosenbaum	Social Sciences	Psychology
Sandra Mendelsohn Rubin	Creative Arts	Fine Arts
Lisa Saltzman	Humanities	Fine Arts Research
Elizabeth D. Samet	Creative Arts	General Nonfiction
Damion Searls	Humanities	Translation
Eldar Shafir	Social Sciences	Psychology
Stephen Sharnoff	Natural Sciences	Science Writing
Judith Shea	Creative Arts	Fine Arts
Fazal Sheikh	Creative Arts	Photography
Maxim D. Shrayer	Humanities	European and Latin American History
Richard Sieburth	Humanities	Translation
Adam C. Siepel	Natural Sciences	Molecular & Cellular Biology
Beth A. Simmons	Social Sciences	Political Science
Mrinalini Sinha	Humanities	South Asian Studies
Richard Snow	Creative Arts	General Nonfiction
Kate Soper	Creative Arts	Music Composition
Valerio Spada	Creative Arts	Photography
Lynn Spigel	Humanities	Architecture, Planning & Design
Paul Stevens	Humanities	English Literature
Ramie Targoff	Humanities	Medieval and Renaissance History
Benjamin Taylor	Creative Arts	General Nonfiction
Terry Teachout	Creative Arts	Biography
Sara Terry	Creative Arts	Photography
Magda Teter	Humanities	European and Latin American History
Francesca Trivellato	Humanities	European and Latin American History
Steven Ungar	Humanities	Film, Video, & Radio Studies
Carlos Villa	Creative Arts	Fine Arts
Gayle Wald	Humanities	Folklore & Popular Culture
Xiao-Jing Wang	Natural Sciences	Neuroscience
Luise White	Humanities	African Studies
Daniel Wiener	Creative Arts	Fine Arts
Elizabeth Willis	Creative Arts	Poetry
Alan E. Willner	Natural Sciences	Engineering
Christian Wiman	Creative Arts	Poetry
James A. Winn	Humanities	English Literature
John Wray	Creative Arts	Fiction
Stephen Yablo	Humanities	Philosophy
Xiaogang Ye	Creative Arts	Music Composition
Netta Yerushalmy	Creative Arts	Choreography
C. Dale Young	Creative Arts	Poetry
Huimin Zhao	Natural Sciences	Engineering
