= 2022 Whitney Biennial =

80th edition of art biennial

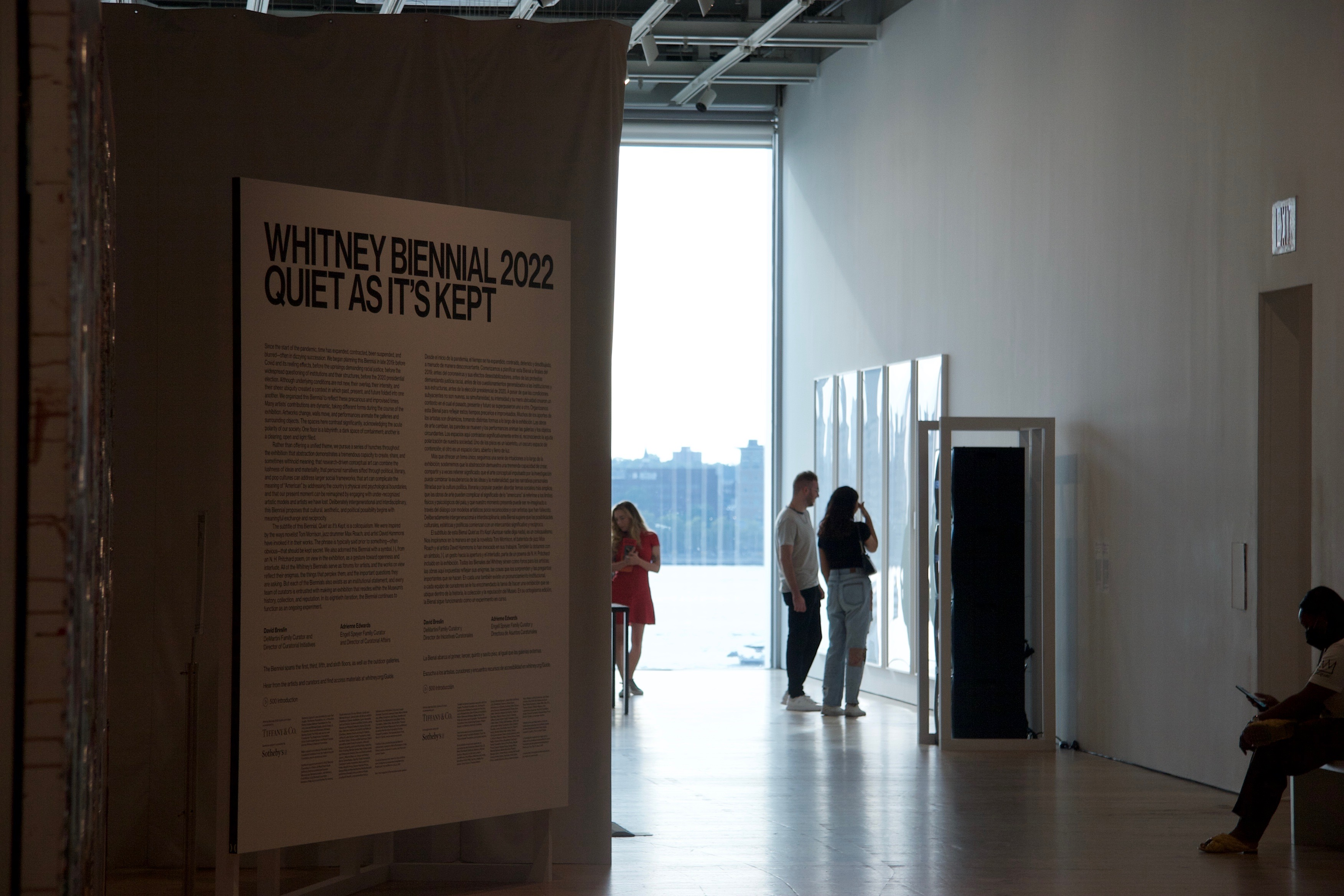
- Genre: Art exhibition
- Begins: April 6, 2022
- Ends: October 16, 2022
- Location: New York City
- Country: United States
- Next event: 2024 Whitney Biennial
- Organizer: Whitney Museum

The 2022 Whitney Biennial, titled Quiet as It's Kept, is the 80th edition of the Whitney Museum's art biennial, hosted between April and October of 2022. Described by ARTnews as the "most closely watched contemporary art exhibition in the United States." The 2022 biennial was curated by David Breslin and Adrienne Edwards, exhibiting 63 artists and collectives, with installations extending over the 5th and 6th floors and adjacent balconies of the Whitney Museum building.

== Artists ==
The curators selected 63 artists for the biennial:

- Lisa Alvarado
- Harold Ancart
- Mónica Arreola
- Emily Barker
- Yto Barrada
- Rebecca Belmore
- Jonathan Berger
- Nayland Blake
- Cassandra Press
- Theresa Hak Kyung Cha
- Raven Chacon
- Leidy Churchman
- Tony Cokes
- Jacky Connolly
- Matt Connors
- Alex Da Corte
- Aria Dean
- Danielle Dean
- Buck Ellison
- Alia Farid
- Coco Fusco
- Ellen Gallagher
- A Gathering of the Tribes/Steve Cannon
- Cy Gavin
- Adam Gordon
- Renée Green
- Pao Houa Her
- EJ Hill
- Alfredo Jaar
- Rindon Johnson
- Ivy Kwan Arce and Julie Tolentino
- Ralph Lemon
- Duane Linklater
- James Little
- Rick Lowe
- Daniel Joseph Martinez
- Dave McKenzie
- Rodney McMillian
- Na Mira
- Alejandro "Luperca" Morales
- Moved by the Motion
- Terence Nance
- Woody De Othello
- Adam Pendleton
- N. H. Pritchard
- Lucy Raven
- Charles Ray
- Jason Rhoades
- Andrew Roberts
- Guadalupe Rosales
- Veronica Ryan
- Rose Salane
- Michael E. Smith
- Sable Elyse Smith
- Awilda Sterling-Duprey
- Rayyane Tabet
- Denyse Thomasos
- Trinh T. Minh-ha
- WangShui
- Eric Wesley
- Dyani White Hawk
- Kandis Williams

== See also ==
- Whitney Biennial
- List of Whitney Biennial artists
- List of Whitney Biennial curators
