= Mangrané =

Mangrané is a surname. Notable people with the surname include:

- Daniel Mangrané, Spanish film producer, screenwriter and film director
- Daniel Steegmann Mangrané, artist
- Manuela Delsors Mangrané, Spanish painter
