= Lauren Cornell =

American curator

- Born: New York, New York, United States
- Occupation: Museum curator

Lauren Cornell is an American curator and writer based in New York. Cornell is the Chief Curator of the Hessel Museum of Art and the Director of the Graduate Program at the Center for Curatorial Studies, Bard College. Previously, she was a curator at the New Museum and was the executive director of their affiliate Rhizome (2005-2012).

== Biography ==
Cornell was born and raised in New York City.

In 2005, she became the executive director of Rhizome, an organization that commissions, exhibits, and preserves art engaged with technology. In 2007, she became adjunct curator at the New Museum where she organized and co-organized exhibitions and public programs, including the inaugural New Museum Triennial and Free, an exhibition for the New Museum in October 2010, among other shows. In 2010, Cornell co-founded Rhizome's Seven on Seven conference with Fred Benenson, John Borthwick, and Peter Rojas. The conference bridges contemporary art and technology fields by pairing technological innovators with visual artists and challenging them to develop something over the course of a day. Seven on Seven was inspired by Experiments in Art and Technology (E.A.T.), a project launched by Billy Klüver and Robert Rauschenberg in 1967, which organized collaborations between artists and engineers at Bell Labs. In 2016, Cornell and Ed Halter co-edited the anthology Mass Effect: Art and the Internet in the Twenty-First Century (2016).

She stepped down from her role at Rhizome in July 2012 to curate the New Museum's third Triennial, Surround Audience, in 2015, co-organized with the artist Ryan Trecartin.

At the Center for Curatorial Studies, she oversees the Graduate Program in Curatorial Studies and has curated monographic exhibitions of Sky Hopinka, Martine Syms, Nil Yalter (coorganized with Museum Ludwig, Cologne), Dara Birnbaum (her first US retrospective), Daniel Steegmann Mangrane, Liliana Porter, Erika Verzutti, and Leidy Churchman.

In 2019, she cocurated Phantom Plane: Cyberpunk in the Year of the Future with Xue Tan, Dawn Chan, Jeppe Ugelvig and Tobias Berger at Tai Kwun Contemporary in Hong Kong.

She has contributed to publications including Aperture, Art in America, ArtReview, Frieze, and Mousse, and written on artists for monographic catalogues.

In 2016, Artsy named Cornell one of "The 20 Most Influential Young Curators in the United States." In 2017, Cornell was the recipient of ArtTable's New Leadership Award. In 2017, she was named an Apollo 40 under 40.

== Exhibitions ==
- Young-Hae Chang Heavy Industries Black on White, Gray Ascending, December 2007 – March 2008 (co-curated with Laura Hoptman)
- New Museum Triennial: Younger Than Jesus, April–July 2009 (co-curated with Massimiliano Gioni and Laura Hoptman
- Free, October 2010-January 2011
- Walking Drifting Dragging, January–February 2013
- New Museum Triennial: Surround Audience, February–May 2015 (co-curated with Ryan Trecartin)
- Song, Strategy, Sign: Beatriz Santiago Munoz (co-curated with Johanna Burton and Sara O’Keeffe)
- Invisible Adversaries at CCS Bard, June–September 2016 (co-curated with Tom Eccles)
- Daniel Steegmann Mangrané: A Transparent Leaf Instead of the Mouth at CCS Bard
- Nil Yalter: Exile is a Hard Job at CCS Bard
- Leidy Churchman: Crocodile at CCS Bard
- Sky Hopinka: Centers of Somewhere at CCS Bard
- Dara Birnbaum: Reaction at CCS Bard
- Martine Syms: Grio College at CCS Bard
- Erika Verzutti: New Moons at CCS Bard

== Selected writings ==
- The Intensity and Integrity of Ian White, Frieze
- Mass Effect, Mousse Magazine
- Self-Portraiture in the First-Person Age, Aperture
- In the Studio: Dara Birnbaum, Art in America
- Techno-animism, Mousse Magazine
- Down the Line, Frieze
- If the Future Were Now: A.K. Burns, Mousse Magazine
- On Club Internet, Mousse Magazine

== Publications ==
- Cornell, Lauren, Massimiliano Gioni, and Laura Hoptman, eds. Younger Than Jesus: The Reader. New York: New Museum / London: Steidl & Partners, 2009.
- Cornell, Lauren, ed., Free. New York/New Museum, 2010.
- Cornell, Lauren and Helga Christoffersen, eds. 2015 Triennial: Surround Audience. New York: New Museum / Rizzoli Skira, 2015.
- Cornell, Lauren and Ed Halter, eds. Mass Effect: Art and the Internet in the 21st Century. New York: New Museum / Cambridge, MA: the MIT Press, 2015.
- Cornell, Lauren and Eccles, Tom, eds. Invisible Adversaries. New York: Hessel Museum, 2016.
- Cornell, Lauren, Karen Kelly, and Barbara Schroeder, eds., Leidy Churchman: Crocodile. New York: Hessel Museum / CCS Bard, 2019.
- Cornell, Lauren, Elizabeth Chodos, and Barbara Schroeder, eds., Dara Birnbaum: Reaction. New York: Hessel Museum / CCS Bard, 2022.
- Cornell, Lauren, Ruba Katrib, Bernardo Mosquiera, and Erika Verzutti, eds. Erika Verzutti: New Moons. New York: CCS Bard, Institute for Studies on Latin American Art (ISLAA) and Dancing Foxes Press, 2023
