= Remie =

Remie is both a given name and a surname. Notable people with the name include:

- Jan Remie (1924–1950), Dutch boxer
- Olivia Remie Constable (1961–2014), American historian
- Remie Olmberg (born 1950), Surinamese football player
- Remie Streete (born 1994), English football player
