= Leidy Churchman =

American painter

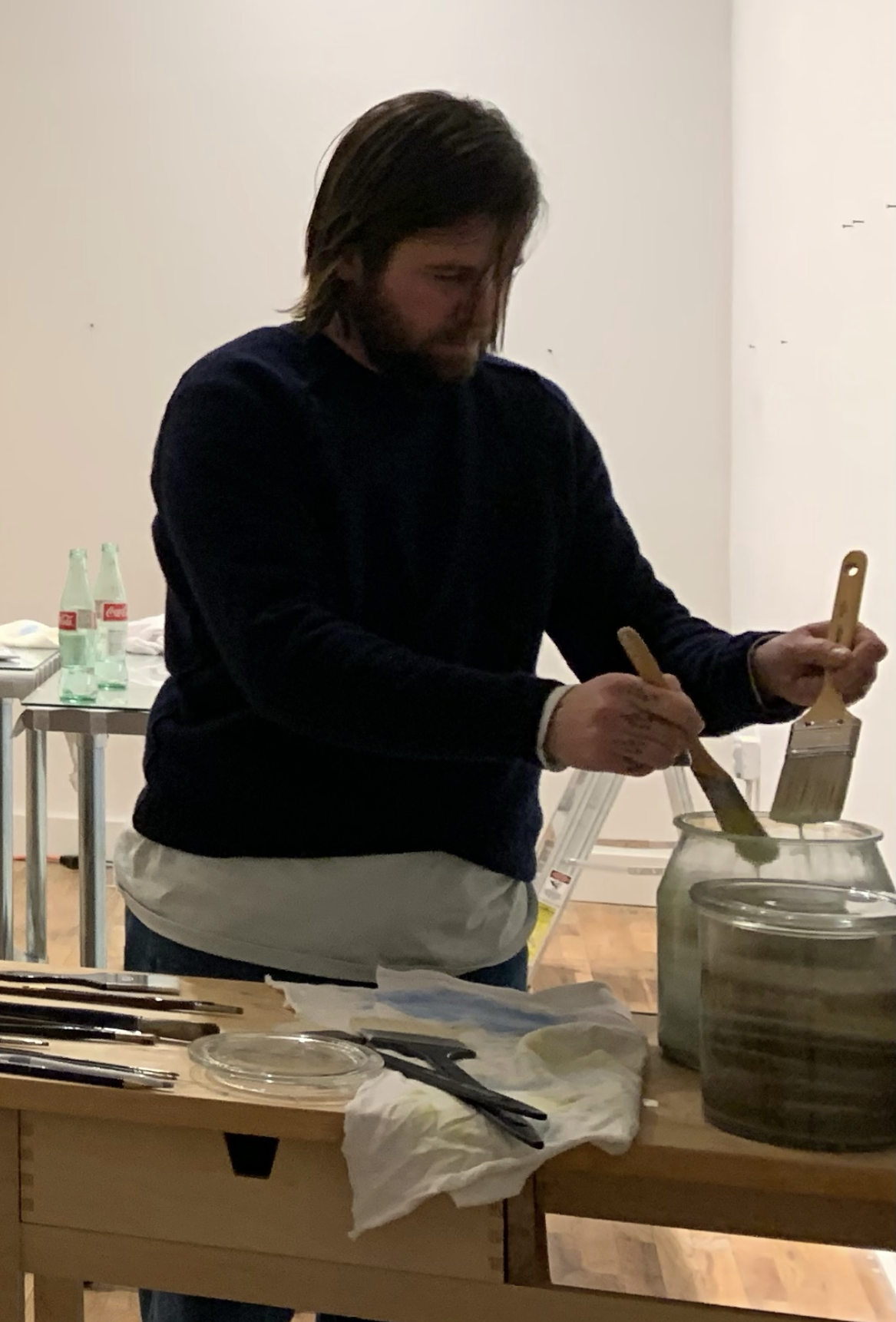
Leidy Churchman in their studio, 2022

Leidy Churchman (/ˈlaɪdi/ LYE-dee; born 1979 in Villanova, PA) is an American painter who lives and works in New York.

== Early life and education ==
Churchman received their M.F.A. from Columbia University in 2010 and B.A. from Hampshire College, Amherst, Massachusetts, in 2002. From 2011 to 2012, they were a resident artist at Rijksakademie van Beeldende in Amsterdam. The artist's work has been reviewed in the New York Times and Artforum.

== Career ==
Churchman first presented their work publicly in 2002 through queer feminist journal and art collective LTTR, which also included artists K8 Hardy, Every Ocean Hughs (then Emily Roysdon), and Ginger Brooks.

Crocodile, Churchman's first US museum exhibition at Hessel Museum of Art at Bard College, surveyed more than sixty oil paintings dating from 2010 to 2019. The accompanying catalogue, co-published by Dancing Foxes Press and CCS Bard, features essays by Ruba Katrib, Arnisa Zeqo and Alex Kitnick, as well as an interview between Churchman and curator Lauren Cornell. Churchman's work has been the subject of institutional exhibitions at Kölnischer Kunstverein (2017) and Boston University Art Gallery, and was also included in the important group exhibitions One day at a Time: Manny Farber and Termite Art at Museum of Contemporary Art, Los Angeles (2018–19); Trigger: Gender as a Tool and a Weapon at the New Museum, New York (2017–18); Painting 2.0: Expression in the Information Age at Museum Brandhorst, Munich (2015), and Greater New York, MoMA PS1, New York (2010).

Churchman's work is held in the collections of the Whitney Museum of American Art and Mumok, among others.

Churchman's work is represented by Matthew Marks Gallery.

They are concerned with the question of how images are perceived and processed in the present age, when visual stimuli display an omnipresence.

In addition, during the period from 2011 till 2012, Churchman acted as a resident artist at Rijksakademie van beeldende kunsten in Amsterdam. Currently, they live and work in New York City.

In 2022, Churchman participated in the 2022 Whitney Biennial titled "Quiet as It's Kept" curated by Adrienne Edwards and David Breslin.

== Achievements ==
- Leidy Churchman is a well-known painter who is known for their works that explore the question of how images are perceived and processed in the modern world.
- Leidy is a recipient of the Hampshire College Threshold Grant for Continued Study. Their works are kept in the collections of different museums, including the Whitney Museum of American Art and Mumok.

== Exhibitions ==
- Good Afternoon!, Sunday Gallery, New York (2009)
- Painting Treatments, Horton Gallery, Berlin (2010)
- Black Green Black, Silberkuppe Galerie, Berlin (2012)
- Lazy River, Boston University Art Gallery at the Stone Gallery (2013)
- A Fruit Stare, Silberkuppe Galerie, Berlin (2014)
- The Meal of the Lion, Murray Guy, New York (2015)
- Permanent Culture, Art Basel: Statements, Murray Guy (2016)
- Lost Horizons, Rodeo, London (2016)
- Free Delivery, Kölnischer Kunstverein, Cologne (2017)
- Kindly Bent to Ease Us, Mary Boone Gallery, New York (2017)
- For The Moon There is The Cloud, Reena Spaulings Fine Art, Los Angeles (2018)
- Snowlion, Rodeo, Piraeus, Greece (2018)
- Crocodile, Hessel Museum of Art and CCS at Bard College, Annandale-on-Hudson (2019)
- Earth Bound, Matthew Marks Gallery, New York (2020)
- The Between is Ringing, Rodeo, London (2021)
- FOCUS, Modern Art Museum of Fort Worth (2021)
- New You, Matthew Marks Gallery, New York (2022)

== Views ==
Leidy Churchman explores the way images are perceived and processed in modern times. Within this context, they produce paintings, based on pre-existing images from the "extraordinary junkyard' of visual formulations. Thus, the artist copies the works of other artists and uses logos, book covers or advertisements as sources or makes references to Far Eastern religions or art, related to folklore. For this reason, the pictorial universe, that confronts viewers in Churchman's presentations, often seems familiar, even if the paintings differ from their sources to a greater or lesser extent.

== Collections ==
Churchman's work can be found in a number of institutions, including:

- Whitney Museum of American Art, New York
- Hessel Museum of Art and CCS at Bard College, New York
- Mumok, Austria
- National Gallery of Canada, Ottawa, Ontario
- Siftung Kunsthalle Bern, Switzerland
- Rollins Museum of Art, Florida
