= Rose Salane =

American artist

- Born: 1992 (age 33–34); Queens, New York City, New York, U.S.
- Education: Cooper Union, City College of New York
- Occupations: conceptual artist, curator

Rose Salane (born 1992) is an American conceptual artist and curator. She lives and works in New York City.

== Early life and education ==
Rose Salane was born in 1992 in Queens, New York City. She is of Peruvian and Italian descent. Salane graduated from LaGuardia High School.

She received a BFA degree in 2014 from Cooper Union; followed by an MA degree in 2019 in urban planning at the Bernard and Anne Spitzer School of Architecture, City College of New York. She was a student of Michael Sorkin.

== Artistic practice ==
Salane is a conceptual artist who works in a spectrum of mediums, from sculpture to collage. Her work has a research component that investigates the past, often excavating through personal and bureaucratic archives and collections to better understand peoples movement through an urban environment.

== Exhibitions ==
In 2016, Salane co-curated, with Dylan Kraus, a group show titled: ''TOO MUCH OF A GOOD THING'' presented at Basilica Hudson; the exhibition featured artists Antonia Kuo, William Stone, Donald Baechler, Dylan Kraus, Elizabeth Jaeger, Haley Josephs, Joey Palermo, Kayla Guthrie, Keegan McHargue, Lance De Los Reyes, Marwan Makki, Patrick Higgins, Rita Ackermann, Rose Salane, Ry Fyan, Tauba Auerbach, Vanessa Leiva Santos, Wade Oates.

In 2019, Salane had a one person show at the MIT List Visual Arts Center. In 2021, her project C21OWO was presented at The Hessel Museum, Bard. Salane participated in the 2021 edition of the New Museum Triennial. In 2022, Salane participated in the 2022 Whitney Biennial curated by Adrienne Edwards and David Breslin.
