= Alia Farid =

Artist who works across the disciplines of art, architecture, and urban anthropology

- Born: 1985 (age 40–41); Kuwait
- Education: BFA, La Escuela de Artes Plasticas de Puerto Rico; MS, Massachusetts Institute of Technology (MIT)
- Known for: Sculpture, Installation, Video
- Website: aliafarid.com

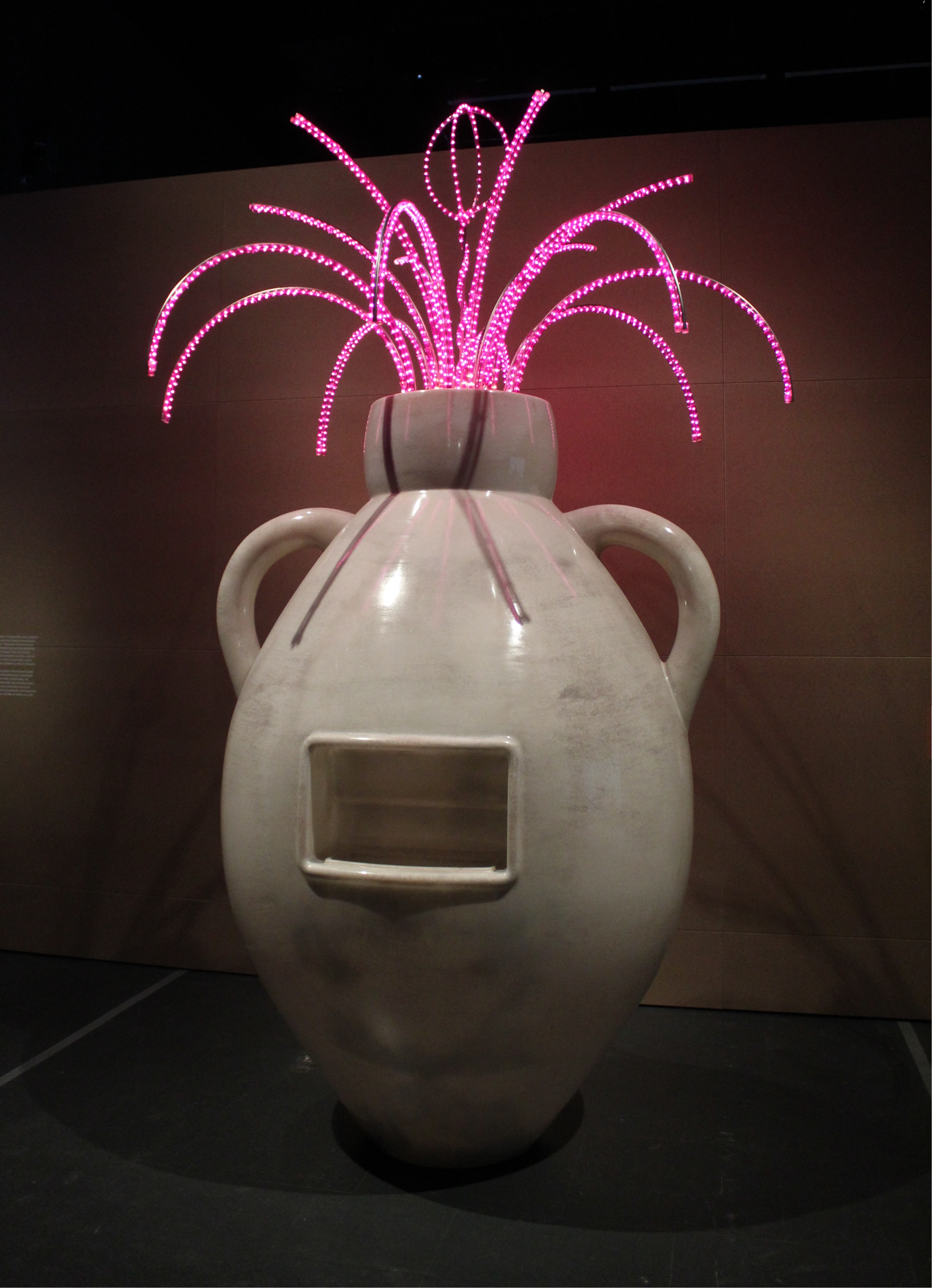
Zamzamiya by Farid, Victoria and Albert Museum

Alia Farid (born 1985) is a Kuwaiti-Puerto Rican visual artist. She holds a Bachelor of Fine Arts from La Escuela de Artes Plásticas de Puerto Rico, Puerto Rico, a Master of Science in Visual Studies from the Visual Arts Program at MIT, Cambridge, MA, and a Master of Arts in Museum Studies and Critical Theory from the Programa d’Estudis Independents at MACBA, Barcelona.

== Exhibitions ==
Recent and upcoming solo exhibitions include In Lieu of What Was at Portikus, Frankfurt and Alia Farid, a solo exhibition at Witte de With Center for Contemporary Art, Rotterdam, The Power Plant Contemporary Art Gallery, and Contemporary Art Museum St. Louis. Recent and upcoming group shows include participation in the 32nd Bienal de São Paulo, the 12th Gwangju Biennale, Sharjah Biennial 14, the 2nd Lahore Biennale, and Theater of Operations: The Gulf Wars 1991–2001 at MoMA PS1. In Switzerland, she first exhibited her new three bodies of artwork from February 11- to May 2022. She installed different water bottles in Kunsthalle Basel and found textile harnesses there. Farid is participating in the 2022 Whitney Biennial titled "Quiet as It's Kept" curated by Adrienne Edwards and David Breslin.
