= Mónica Arreola =

Visual artist, architect, and gallery director

- Born: 1976 (age 48–49); Mexico
- Occupation(s): visual artist, architect, and gallery director

Mónica Arreola (Mexico, 1976) is a visual artist, architect, and gallery director who lives and works in Tijuana, Mexico.

== Artistic practice ==
In 2006, Arreola showed at the Museum of Contemporary Art San Diego in Strange New World: Art and Design from Tijuana/Extraño Nuevo Mondo: Arte y diseño desde Tijuana. Arreola makes work that investigates architecture and the Mexico–United States border. In 2022, Arreola participated in the 2022 Whitney Biennial curated by Adrienne Edwards and David Breslin.
