= Matthew Marks =

Matthew Marks may refer to:

- Matthew Marks Gallery, an art gallery in New York City
- Matthew Robinson Marks (1834–1911), American politician, mayor of Orlando
