= Churchman =

Churchman typically refers to a member of the clergy.

Churchman or Churchmen may also refer to:

- English Churchman, a family Protestant newspaper founded in 1843
- Churchman (journal), an Evangelical Anglican academic journal, formerly known as The Churchman
- Churchman (surname)
- Churchman's, a former British cigarette manufacturer
- The Churchmen, English title of French TV series Ainsi soient-ils
