= Trivellato =

Trivellato is an Italian surname. Notable people with the surname include:

- Alex Trivellato (born 1993), Italian ice hockey player
- Francesca Trivellato (born 1970), Italian historian
