= Woody De Othello =

American artist (born 1991)

- Born: 1991 (age 34–35); Miami, Florida, U.S.
- Education: Florida Atlantic University (BFA), California College of Arts (MFA)
- Occupations: Ceramicist, painter
- Website: www.woodyothello.com

Woody De Othello (born 1991) is an American ceramicist and painter. He lives and works in the San Francisco Bay Area, California.

== Early life and education ==
Woody De Othello was born in 1991, in Miami, Florida. He is of Haitian descent.

Othello received a BFA degree from Florida Atlantic University in Boca Raton, and an MFA degree from the California College of Arts in San Francisco in 2017.

== Career ==
In 2015, Othello's debut solo exhibition, It's Going To Be Ok, was held at Unit 1 gallery in Lake Worth, Florida. In 2018, he was included in Yerba Buena Center for the Arts triennial exhibition, "Bay Area Now 8." In 2019, the San Jose Museum of Art hosted Woody De Othello: Breathing Room. Looking In, a solo exhibition of Othello's work at Jessica Silverman Gallery in 2021, included ceramic sculptures, paintings, and framed works on paper.

His eight-foot tall, bronze sculpture of a yellow box fan, entitled Cool Composition, received critical attention at 2019's Art Basel in Miami Beach.

In 2022, Othello was selected to participate in the 2022 Whitney Biennial, curated by Adrienne Edwards and David Breslin. His biennial installation, The will to make things happen, included a set of exaggerated, domestic objects such as a radiator, accompanied by anthropomorphized ceramic vessels with hands and legs.

Othello has referred to pottery by South Carolinian enslaved potters such as David Drake, as well as precolonial Yoruba pottery, being inspiration for his work.

Othello's first solo major museum exhibition, Woody de Othello: coming forth by day, opened at the Pérez Art Museum Miami, Florida, in 2025. The show gathers a new body of work in ceramics, wood and bronze referencing spiritual and ritual objects. This is the artist's first solo exhibition in his South Florida hometown.

== Exhibitions ==
- 2016 UFO Gallery, Berkeley, California
- 2016 Quality, Oakland, California
- 2018 Jessica Silverman Gallery, San Francisco
- 2019 Karma, New York
- 2019 33rd Ljublijana Biennial of Graphic Arts in Ljublijana, Slovenia
- 2019-2020 San Jose Museum of Art, California
- 2020 Pippy Houldsworth Gallery, London
- 2020 Nina Johnson, Miami
- 2021 Jessica Silverman Gallery, San Francisco
- 2021-2022 Woody de Othello: Hope Omens, John Michael Kohler Arts Center, Sheboygan, Wisconsin
- 2022 2022 Whitney Biennial: Quiet as It's Kept
- 2025 Woody de Othello: coming forth by day, Pérez Art Museum Miami, Florida

== Collections ==
Othello's work is in the collection of a number of contemporary art museums, including Institute of Contemporary Art, Miami; San Francisco Museum of Modern Art; San Jose Museum of Art, San Jose, California; and the Renwick Gallery, Smithsonian American Art Museum, Washington D.C.
