= Churchman (surname) =

Churchman is a surname. Notable people with the surname include:

- Arthur Churchman, 1st Baron Woodbridge (1867–1949), British tobacco manufacturer, soldier and politician
- Charles West Churchman (1913–2004), American philosopher
- David Churchman (born 1938), a California State University professor
- Leidy Churchman (born 1979), American painter
- Ricky Churchman (born 1958), American football player
- William Churchman (1863–1947), an English tobacco manufacturer
- Ysanne Churchman (1925–2024), British actress
