= Ascheim =

Ascheim or Aschheim is a German surname. Notable people with this surname include:

- Deborah Aschheim (born 1964), American new media artist
- Elizabeth Fleischman-Aschheim (1867–1905), American radiographer, an X-ray pioneer
- Eve Aschheim (born 1958), American draftsperson and painter
- Isidor Ascheim (1891–1968) German-born Israeli painter and printmaker
- Selmar Aschheim (1878–1965), Jewish-German gynecologist
- Tom Ascheim, American television executive

== See also ==
- Aschheim
