= Na Mira =

Visual artist and filmmaker

- Born: 1982 (age 43–44); Lawrence, Kansas, U.S.
- Other name: Dylan Mira
- Education: School of the Art Institute of Chicago, University of California, Los Angeles
- Occupations: Artist, educator
- Known for: Installation art

Na Mira (born 1982), also known as Dylan Mira, is an American artist and educator, known for her installation art. She is based out of Los Angeles, California, "on Tongva, Gabrielino, Kizh, and Chumash lands."

== Early life and education ==
Na Mira was born in 1982 in Lawrence, Kansas. She grew up between the United States and East Asia, and is of Korean-American descent.

Mira received a BFA degree in 2006 in Film, Video, New Media at the School of the Art Institute of Chicago; and a MFA degree in 2013 in New Genres at the University of California, Los Angeles.

== Artistic practice and exhibitions ==
Beginning in 2018, Mira has a since ongoing video installation series titled Night Vision. The Night Vision series started with a noted visual glitch when filming with an infrared camera in Jeju Island in South Korea, and the work features audio components. Her Night Vision work touches on topics such as esotericism, Korean shamanism, feminism, and personal family history.

In January 2022, Fulcrum Arts hosted a conversation titled "Unfolding Dimensions" between Mira, Simon Leung, and Satyan Devadoss, focused on an analysis of Mira’s research work in the archives of Theresa Hak Kyung Cha.

In April 2022, Mira participated in a "multi-sensorial, durational performance" Eternal Spa, organized with QNA (collective) at the Museum of Contemporary Art, Los Angeles.

Mira was selected to participate in the 2022 Whitney Biennial titled "Quiet as It's Kept" curated by Adrienne Edwards and David Breslin. Mira presented Night Vision (Red as never been), 2022, a video installation at the 2022 Whitney Biennial, a work in conversation with the work of Theresa Hak Kyung Cha.

Mira is on the faculty at University of California, Riverside (UCR) in the Department of Art.

From November 14, 2026 – February 15, 2027, the Museum of Modern Art will present Na Mira NO SMOKING which "examines the military origins of imaging and sonic technologies, and considers how these tools have shaped our perception." The piece was commissioned by Museum of Modern Art and is accompanied with music by Chuquimamani-Condori.
