= Alex Da Corte =

American artist

- Born: 1980 (age 45–46); Camden, New Jersey, U.S.
- Education: Yale University
- Website: alexdacorte.com

Alex Da Corte (born 1980) is an American conceptual artist who works across a range of different media, including painting, sculpture, installation, performance, and video. His work explores the nuances of contemporary experience by layering inspirations from varied sources, drawing equally from popular culture and art history.

Da Corte was included in the 2022 Whitney Biennial in New York, the 2019 Venice Biennale, and the 2018 Carnegie International in Pittsburgh. His work has been the subject of numerous solo exhibitions, including at the 21st Century Museum of Contemporary Art, Kanazawa, Japan; Louisiana Museum of Modern Art, Humlebæk, Denmark; Metropolitan Museum of Art, New York; Kölnischer Kunstverein, Cologne; Secession, Vienna; and MASS MoCA, North Adams, Massachusetts.

In 2026, Da Corte guest curated Roy Lichtenstein: Like New at the Whitney Museum of American Art (on display October 11, 2026 – May 10, 2027). Da Corte "recreat[ed] by hand two of his monumental billboards that mimic comic strip imagery and executing a painting Lichtenstein designed, but never realized."

== Early life and education ==
Da Corte was born in Camden, New Jersey, in 1980, and lives and works in Philadelphia. He spent his formative years growing up in Venezuela. In 2001, he studied Film/Animation and Fine Arts at the School of Visual Arts in New York City and then went on to receive his BFA in Printmaking/Fine Arts, from the University of the Arts in Philadelphia in 2004. He graduated from Yale University with an MFA in 2010.

== Exhibitions ==
=== Select solo exhibitions ===
- The Death of All Things Beautiful, Rosenwald-Wolf Gallery, University of the Arts, Philadelphia, 2005
- Activity #91, Golden Age, Chicago, 2009
- The Kind of Dog that Keeps You Waiting, Yale Gallery, New Haven, Connecticut, 2010
- I O O O I S L A N D, Joe Sheftel, New York, 2013
- Fun Sponge, ICA at MECA, Portland, 2013
- White Rain, White Cube, London, 2014
- Easternsports, with Jayson Musson, Institute of Contemporary Art, Philadelphia, 2014
- Devil Town, Gió Marconi, Milan, Italy, 2015
- A Season in He'll, Art + Practice, Los Angeles, 2016
- Free Roses, Massachusetts Museum of Contemporary Art, North Adams, Massachusetts, 2016
- 50 Wigs, HEART - Herning Museum of Contemporary Art, Herning, Denmark, 2016
- Slow Graffiti, Secession, Vienna, 2017
- C-A-T Spells Murder, Karma, New York, 2018
- THƎ SUPƎ RMAN, Kölnischer Kunstverein, Cologne, 2018
- Marigolds, Karma, New York, 2019
- Helter Shelter or The Red Show! or..., Sadie Coles HQ, London, 2020
- Rubber Pencil Devil, Prada Rong Zhai, Shanghai, 2020
- The Roof Garden Commission: Alex Da Corte, “As Long as the Sun Lasts”, Metropolitan Museum of Art, New York, 2021
- Mr. Remember, Louisiana Museum of Modern Art, Humlebæk, Denmark, 2022
- The Street, Rosenwald-Wolf Gallery, University of the Arts, Philadelphia, 2023
- Fresh Hell, 21st Century Museum of Contemporary Art, Kanazawa, Japan, 2023
- THE DÆMON, Matthew Marks Gallery, Los Angeles, 2023
- World Leader Pretend, Gió Marconi, Milan, 2024
- Alex Da Corte: The Whale, Modern Art Museum of Fort Worth, Fort Worth, Texas, 2025
- Alex Da Corte: The Party, Buffalo AKG Art Museum, Buffalo, New York, 2026-2027, travels to Philadelphia Museum of Art (Summer 2027); The Party ("opera to be performed by Philadelphia Orchestra... with the video projected behind the singers")

=== Select group exhibitions ===
- Between Spaces, P.S. 1 Contemporary Art Center, New York, 2009
- La Biennale de Lyon, Musée d'Art Contemporain, Lyon, France, 2015
- Dreamlands: Immersive Cinema and Art, 1905–2016, Whitney Museum of American Art, New York, 2016
- Carnegie International, 57th Edition, Carnegie Museum of Art, Pittsburgh, 2018
- May You Live in Interesting Times, 58th Venice Biennale, Central Pavilion and the Arsenale, Venice
- THE DREAMERS, 58th October Salon, Belgrade Biennale, Cultural Centre of Belgrade, Belgrade, 2021
- Quiet as It's Kept, Whitney Biennial, Whitney Museum of American Art, New York, 2022

== Publications ==
- Da Corte, Alex (March 2025). "Soft Power". The Brooklyn Rail. OCLC 64199099.
- Da Corte, Alex (April 2025). "Top Ten: Alex Da Corte". Artforum. Vol. 63, no. 8. pp. 27–30. OCLC 20458258.
