= Design as an Extension of Art Practice =

Design as an Extension of Art Practice was a round-table discussion organized by independent curator Helen Varola and moderated by Muistardeaux Collective during Art Los Angeles in 2010. Panelists were Peter Zellner, Christopher Mount, and Justin Beal.

Transcripts of the discussion were published in the Italian design journal Klat Magazine.
