= Sable Elyse Smith =

American artist (born 1986)

- Born: 1986 (age 39–40); Los Angeles, California
- Education: Oglethorpe University, Parsons School of Design
- Known for: interdisciplinary art

Sable Elyse Smith (born 1986) is an interdisciplinary artist, writer and educator based in New York. Smith works in photography, neon, text, appropriated imagery, sculpture, and video installation connecting language, violence, and pop culture with autobiographical subject matter. In 2018, Smith was an Artist-in Residence at the Studio Museum in Harlem. Her work was first featured at several areas such as MoMA ps1, New Museum, Brooklyn Museum, Philadelphia, MIT list visual arts center, Cambridge, Massachusetts, and other places. The artist lives and works in Richmond, Virginia, and New York City. She has been an assistant professor of Visual Arts at Columbia University since 2020.

== Early life and education ==
Smith was born in 1986 in Los Angeles, California. Smith holds a B.A. in studio art and film from Oglethorpe University and a MFA in Design & Technology from Parsons the New School for Design.

== Work ==
Smith often uses surveillance tape to explore the structure of the incarcerated labor system and its corruption.

A Clockwork (2021) at the Whitney Museum in 2022

Smith makes sculptures and two-dimensional works that raise questions about societal problems. Her work is inspired by her father who had been incarcerated for most of her life. Her work uses common objects from the prison system to question labor, class, and memory with emphasis on the everyday effects of institutional violence. Smith uses coloring books for children used in court setting as a subject in some of her 2D works. Smith has talked about her work stating: "The work should never say the same thing to every viewer. It is multi-vocal in its address and affect—that's the point." She has received several awards from Creative Capital, Fine Arts Work Center, the Queens Museum, Skowhegan School of Painting and Sculpture, Louis Comfort Tiffany Foundation, Rea Hort Mann Foundation, the Franklin Furnace Fund, and Art Matter.

Smith has also made sculptures from furniture designed for the prison system. Her large-scale sculpture A Clockwork (2021), a motorized rotating ferris wheel made of jet-black tables and chairs designed for prison visitation rooms, was included in Quiet as It's Kept, the 2022 Whitney Biennial.

== Exhibitions ==
Smith has staged an array of solo shows at galleries and museums in the United States and internationally. Her notable solo shows include Sable Elyse Smith: Blue is Ubiquitous and Forbidden (2015), SOHO20, New York; Sable Elyse Smith: Ordinary Violence (2017-2018), Queens Museum, New York; How We Tell Stories to Children (2018), Atlanta Contemporary; or the song spilling out (2019), Carlos/Ishikawa Gallery, London; and Tithe (2022), JTT Gallery, New York.

She has also participated in a large number of group exhibitions, including the Whitney Biennial (2022); and the 59th Venice Biennale (2022).

== Notable works in public collections ==
- How We Tell Stories to Children (2015), Brooklyn Museum, New York
- 7655 Days (2017), Whitney Museum, New York
- 7665 Nights (2017), Whitney Museum, New York
- Visiting (2017), Brooklyn Museum, New York
- Coloring Book 9 (2018), Solomon R. Guggenheim Museum, New York
- 8093 Days (2019), Hessel Museum of Art, Annandale-on-Hudson, New York
- Coloring Book 61 (2020), Institute of Contemporary Art, Miami
- Coloring Book 66 (2020), Hessel Museum of Art, Annandale-on-Hudson, New York
- Coloring Book 98 (2022), Hessel Museum of Art, Annandale-on-Hudson, New York
