= Emily Barker (artist) =

American artist (born 1992)

- Born: 1992 (age 33–34); San Diego, California, U.S.
- Education: School of the Art Institute of Chicago
- Occupation: Multidisciplinary artist
- Known for: Disability advocate

Emily Barker (born 1992) is an American multidisciplinary artist and activist based in Los Angeles. Their work focuses on topics related to disability, discrimination, and capitalism.

== Biography ==
Emily Barker was born in 1992 in San Diego, California. They studied at the School of the Art Institute of Chicago (SAIC). At age of 19, Baker was diagnosed with paraplegia following an accident. The following year they were diagnosed with complex regional pain. Barker is a wheelchair user and chronically ill. In addition to making art, Barker has worked as a fashion model.

== Artistry ==
Barker's work examines and challenges ableism embedded into contemporary society.

They have had a solo shows: Wall Works at Sentiment Gallery, Body Politic at the Torrence Art Museum, and Illusions of Care at Carlye Packer.

Their piece Death by 7865 Paper Cuts is an installation of a pile of 7,865 documents.

In 2020, at Murmurs, an art space presented Barker's first solo show titled Built to Scale and 2021 MMK exhibition Crip Time. Barker participated in the 2022 Whitney Biennial titled Quiet as It's Kept curated by Adrienne Edwards and David Breslin.
