= If the Smoke Don't Get You, the Meatloaf Will =

If The Smoke Don't Get You, The Meatloaf Will is an art exhibit produced by Muistardeaux Collective (Thomas Borden, Eric Gibbons, Khyssup Muistardeaux), between June 29-July 5, 2008 at the Diego Rivera Gallery in San Francisco, California. This was Muistardeaux Collective's debut exhibit. It featured an arrow, a ninety-pound meatloaf, a plexiglass smoking chamber, a 32’x8’ wood paneling painting, a video of Muistardeaux Collective chasing cows and smoking parliament cigarettes in a makeshift teepee, a 1972 Chevrolet C20 van (the “MSU - Mobile Smoking Unit”), a two-way surveillance camera system, and an extensive air ductwork and forced air motor system. The ductwork and forced air system connected the MSU, which was parked outside the gallery, to a plexiglass vitrine containing the meatloaf, and to the smoking chamber. Both the vitrine and the chamber were connected via ductwork to two vents at the entry to the gallery. Muistardeaux Collective members Thomas Borden and Eric Gibbons lived in the MSU for the week that the exhibit was installed at the gallery.

The opening for the exhibit was on Tuesday July 1, 2008. The refreshments served were WPLJ (white port and lemon juice) and Beardash Punch (fresh water and snicker bars). The artists talk was delivered by three actors playing the Muistardeaux Collective members. Christy Crowley played Collective leader Khyssup Muistardeaux, Jeffrey Weissman played Eric Gibbons, and Fred Sharkey played Thomas Borden. Borden and Gibbons were sitting in the MSU during the opening smoking Parliament cigarettes. Weissmann and Sharkey also appeared in the Muistardeaux Collective sculpture exhibit Sculpture The Movie.

Matthew C. Walcutt lived in the MSU as a visiting artist on July 4, 2008.
