= As Long as the Sun Lasts =

2021 sculpture by Alex Da Corte

- Artist: Alex Da Corte
- Year: 2021

As Long as the Sun Lasts is a sculpture by Alex Da Corte commissioned for The Metropolitan Museum of Art's Roof Garden and exhibited in 2021.

It is modeled on Alexander Calder's "Gallows and Lollipops", a sculpture on the Beinecke Plaza at Yale University.
