= Stephen Sharnoff =

American botanical photographer and lichenologist

Stephen Sharnoff is a photographer, especially of botanical and lichen subjects. He specializes in close-up botanical color work. He is also a research associate at the University and Jepson Herbaria of the University of California, Berkeley and a past associate of the Missouri Botanical Garden.

With his wife, Sylvia Sharnoff, and the Canadian lichenologist Irwin M. Brodo, he was photographer for Lichens of North America, which won the 2002 National Outdoor Book Award for nature guidebooks. Smithsonian Institution's Thomas Lovejoy commented on the lichen photography that it was "the twenty-first-century equivalent of Audubon's Birds of America." The collection of 1,600 voucher specimens made during this project was initially held by the National Museum of Natural Sciences in Ottawa, Canada but was donated to the United States National Herbarium in 2005. In 2016, the trio, with additional collaborator Susan Laurie-Bourque, produced Keys to Lichens of North America: Revised and Expanded. A further collaboration between the two Sharnoffs and other photographers contributed pictures for Macrolichens of the Pacific Northwest.

In 2012 he was awarded a Guggenheim Fellowship to support his science writing.

He authored and provided photographs for A Field Guide to California Lichens published in 2014.

In the late 2020s, his enthusiasm for preserving old-growth Douglas fir in the Pacific Northwest led to a new conservation group where he is the vice-president, the Friends of Douglas-Fir National Monument, aiming for the establishment of protection for an area of forest in Oregon.

== Publications ==
Sharnoff has contributed photographs to several books as well as magazines. These include:

- Irwin M. Brodo, Susan Laurie-Bourque, Sylvia Duran Sharnoff and Stephen Sharnoff (2016) Keys to Lichens of North America: Revised and Expanded Yale University Press, 424pp ISBN 978-0300195736
- Stephen Sharnoff (2014) A Field Guide to California Lichens Yale University Press, 424pp ISBN 978-0300195002
- Irwin M. Brodo, Sylvia Duran Sharnoff and Stephen Sharnoff (2001) Lichens of North America Yale University Press, 795 pp ISBN 978-0300082494

The Sharnoff's photographs have appeared in National Geographic, Smithsonian Magazine, Equinox Magazine and Bay Nature.
