= Asifa Quraishi =

American educator and legal scholar (born 1967)

- Born: Asifa Bano Quraishi; July 17, 1967 (age 58); Santa Clara County, California, U.S.
- Education: University of California, Berkeley (BA); University of California, Davis (JD); Columbia University (LLM); Harvard University (SJD)
- Occupation: Professor

Asifa Bano Quraishi (aka Asifa Quraishi-Landes) (born July 17, 1967) is an American educator and legal scholar. She is a professor of law at the University of Wisconsin–Madison, where she teaches courses in Islamic law and U.S. constitutional law. Her publications address issues of Islamic constitutionalism in the context of separation of legal authority as well as methodologies of textual interpretation. Quraishi has also written articles for news outlets like The Washington Post and Middle East Eye addressing myths and issues associated with Islam.

== Education ==
Quraishi's father was born in Jaipur, British India, but migrated to Pakistan after the partition of India. She earned a Bachelor of Arts degree from the University of California, Berkeley in 1988 and a Juris Doctor degree from the University of California, Davis School of Law in 1992. She also earned a Master of Laws degree from Columbia Law School in 1998 and a Doctor of Juridical Science degree from Harvard Law School in 2006.

== Career ==
From 1993 to 1994, she served as a law clerk to Judge Edward Dean Price of the United States District Court for the Eastern District of California and from 1994 to 1997, she served as a death penalty law clerk for the Ninth Circuit of the United States Court of Appeals.

Quraishi joined the faculty of University of Wisconsin Law School in 2004. From 2004 to 2012, she was an assistant professor of law. From 2012 to 2017, she was an associate professor of law. Since 2017, she has served as a full professor of law.

Quraishi is a founding board member of the National Association of Muslim Lawyers (NAML), its sister organization Muslim Advocates, based in San Francisco, and American Muslims Intent on Learning and Activism (AMILA). She is also an associate of the Muslim Women’s League and has served as President and board member of Muslim Women’s League. Quraishi received a Guggenheim Fellowship in 2012.

== Selected publications ==
=== Books and journal articles ===
- "No Altars: An Introduction to Islamic Family Law" in Women's Rights and Islamic Family Law: Perspective on Reform ed. Lynn Welchman and Abdullahi an-Naim. (Zed Books, 1996).
- "Her Honor: An Islamic Critique of the Rape Laws of Pakistan from a Woman-Sensitive Perspective," 18 Mich. J. Int'l L. 287 (1997).

=== Online articles ===
- Quraishi-Landes, Asifa (2016-06-24). "Five myths about sharia". The Washington Post.
- Quraishi-Landes, Asifa (May 9, 2017). "How to create an Islamic government – not an Islamic state". Middle East Eye.
- Quraishi-Landes, Asifa (2017-06-08). "How anti-Shariah marches mistake Muslim concepts of state and religious law". Religion News Service.
- Quraishi-Landes, Asifa (March 15, 2019). "Perspective | Five myths about hijab". The Washington Post.
