= Muistardeaux Collective =

Organization of local contemporary artists

Muistardeaux Collective (Thomas Borden, born January 3, 1968, in West Hartford, CT, and Eric Gibbons, born October 17, 1974, on Wright-Patterson Air Force Base near Dayton, OH) are contemporary artists who live and work in Half Moon Bay, CA and Portland, OR.

== Biography ==
Tom Borden and Eric Gibbons are primarily a performance art duo. They met in 2007 at San Francisco Art Institute. Upon combining their artistic efforts, they created Muistardeaux Collective. The Collective takes their name from Khyssup Muistardeaux, an imaginary artist that the duo invented to be included in the three-person exhibition If The Smoke Don’t Get You, The Meatloaf Will. In this exhibition, they created a 90 lb meatloaf. Despite threats of expulsion and some faculty resistance, Muistardeaux Collective received Masters of Fine Arts degrees and gave the commencement address in the form of North Sea Jazz.

Immediately upon being graduated, Muistardeaux Collective executed Sculpture LA at the San Francisco Museum of Modern Art. Muistardeaux Collective also recently moderated the round-table discussion Design as an Extension of Art Practice curated by Helen Varola, at Art Los Angeles in 2010.

Khyssup Muistardeaux, (born June 21, 1962, in Apatou, French Guiana) is the namesake of the artist collective, Muistardeaux Collective. She is an imaginary artist invented by Thomas Borden and Eric Gibbons to be included in the three-person exhibition If The Smoke Don’t Get You, The Meatloaf Will. Actress Christy Crowley appeared live as Khyssup Muistardeaux at the opening for this exhibition. Her biography states that she is French Guianese and still lists that country as her home, although she spends time in Berlin. The artist Elizabeth Pedinotti has also appeared as Khyssup Muistardeaux.

In 2017, Tom moved with his family to Portland, Oregon a few miles from Eric and the Collective intensified their production. They paint and produce and perform music.

== Music ==
Muistardeaux Collective often incorporates live and recorded music in their projects. They have written recorded and released 12 albums to date on Northern California record label Mark Williams Van Proyen Records. Muistardeaux Collective’s music is professionally managed by Ken Stallings of Stallings Group LTD.

== Discography ==
- Very Jazzy (2007)
- Doorslam Sessions with I Wanna Be Like Michael Jackson (2008)
- Live (2008)
- Sellecks (2008)
- Aga Dos (2009)
- Kimmerly (2009)
- Kenton-Miramar (2010)
- The Tighe O’Shannon Band (2010)
- Lonestars (2010)
- Face the Music I (2011)
