= Ivy Kwan Arce =

Asian American HIV/AIDS activist and artist

Ivy Kwan Arce is a first-generation Chinese American HIV survivor, HIV/AIDS activist and artist. She is a surviving member of the People with Aids (PWA) Health Group and was part of grassroots organizations such as the Asian Pacific Islander Coalition on HIV/AIDS (APICHA) and God's Love We Deliver. Today Kwan Arce is a longstanding activist with groups such as ACT UP (AIDS Coalition to Unleash Power) and TAG (Treatment Action Group).

== HIV+ and ACT UP ==
In 1990, Kwan Arce came across an ACT UP poster in New York City that said “Women don't get AIDS. They just die from it.” In fine print, it listed HIV symptoms that weren't recognized by the CDC but were often occurring in women and IV drug users. Kwan Arce says the poster prompted her to get tested. At the time, AIDS was widely perceived as a gay man's disease, and there was no medical HIV/AIDS diagnosis for women. As a result, when she tested positive, her doctor had neither the experience nor the expertise to treat her. He suggested she go to ACT UP because it was one of the few places fighting on behalf of people with HIV/AIDS.

Kwan Arce went to The Lesbian and Gay Community Services Center (now known as The Lesbian, Gay, Bisexual & Transgender Community Center) for an ACT UP meeting. But Kwan Arce says as a straight Chinese female it was hard to feel seen, with people constantly asking why she was there. Sometimes she was mistaken for a nurse. Despite feeling invisible, Kwan Arce dedicated herself to ACT UP and has remained with the organization for over 30 years. In the early years, their activism led to a formal definition of AIDS for women so they could be medically recognized in order to receive lifesaving treatment.

== Activism and art ==
Kwan Arce has been involved in the fight against HIV/AIDS since her first ACT UP meeting in 1990. She was part of the PWA Women's Treatment Group and the Pediatric Working Group, which mobilized women with AIDS to demand access to medication and clinical trials. From 1995 until 1999, she was a voting member of the federal HIV and AlDS Planning Council, where she managed the distribution of the Ryan White Title I funds, which provided services to HIV/AIDS patients. Since 2012, she has been dedicated to women's health and prevention by promoting pre-exposure prophylaxis (PrEP) and its accessibility for women. She is also a member of Rise and Resist, a direct action group formed in response to the 2016 presidential election. In 2021, in collaboration with TAG (Treatment Action Group), Kwan Arce organized an ACT UP Health Fair at Reclaim Pride to offer HIV testing, Covid-19 vaccinations and PrEP information.

Art has always been a part of Kwan Arce's activism, and she has created materials for campaigns in nearly every organization she has worked with. In 2019, Kwan Arce was honored for her three decades of activism by the Performance Space New York. In 2021, Kwan Arce was an honoree for the Treatment Action Group (TAG) Research in Action Awards, which honors activists, scientists, philanthropists, and creative artists who've made extraordinary contributions in the fight against HIV, tuberculosis, and hepatitis C.

In 2022, Kwan Arce was a featured artist in the Whitney Biennial 2022: Quiet as It's Kept as part of a collaborative work with visual and performance artist and AIDS activist Julie Tolentino.

== Personal life ==
Kwan Arce is married with two children. Both children were born HIV-negative due to medication preventing mother-to-child transmission.
