= Julien Nguyen =

American painter (born 1990)

- Born: 1990; Fairfax, Virginia, US
- Known for: painter

Julien Nguyen is a Vietnamese American artist. He is known for Renaissance-inspired, meticulously rendered figurative works that fuse art-historical motifs with science fiction, gaming and contemporary portraiture. He lives and works in Los Angeles and participated in the 2017 Whitney Biennial. His work is held by institutions including the Whitney Museum of American Art.

== Biography ==
=== Early life and education ===
Julien Nguyen was born in 1990 in Fairfax, Virginia to Vietnamese parents who had emigrated to America after the fall of Saigon. As a teenager, Nguyen was more interested in video games than traditional art, citing formative influences such as Civilization III, Age of Empires and StarCraft. This early immersion in strategy and speculative worlds later fed into his pictorial vocabulary of art history meeting digital iconography. Nguyen went on to pursue formal art training. He earned a Bachelor of Fine Arts (BFA) from the Rhode Island School of Design (RISD) in 2012. Afterward, he continued his studies at Städelschule in Frankfurt in Germany, where he completed the postgraduate Meisterschule (Master School) in 2015.

== Work ==
Nguyen is primarily a painter, working in oil and tempera on panel. His work is noted for its highly precise, virtuosic technique, which deliberately recalls the finish and compositional mastery of 15th-century painters like Fra Angelico and Caravaggio.

Nguyen's paintings combine references to Renaissance and early Christian art with elements drawn from contemporary culture, science fiction, and digital media. His compositions frequently adapt motifs from artists such as Piero della Francesca, Giotto, and Leonardo da Vinci, reinterpreting them through a modern lens informed by anime, video games and speculative fiction. Nguyen's technical approach is rooted in traditional materials—oil and tempera on panel, occasionally on copper—while his subject matter often involves friends and collaborators presented in allegorical or devotional settings. Critics have observed that his paintings merge "the sacred and the secular", reflecting both the precision of Renaissance painting and the introspection of portrait photography. Recurring themes in Nguyen's work include spiritual devotion, intimacy and technology. His figures are often rendered with elongated proportions and subdued color, suggesting detachment or transcendence. The artist has described his imagery as influenced by strategy games such as Civilization III and StarCraft, noting their structural and historical world-building as parallel to the construction of pictorial space. Nguyen's practice has been characterized by critics as balancing restraint and intensity. Artforum described his paintings as "meticulously composed devotional images that collapse medieval reverence into the anxieties of the present", while Frieze called them "unsettling hybrids of human and technological beauty".

== Major exhibitions ==
His work was included in the 2017 Whitney Biennial at the Whitney Museum of American Art in New York. He has had one-person exhibitions at institutions and galleries, including:

- Matthew Marks Gallery, New York and Los Angeles
- Swiss Institute, New York
- Kunstverein München, Munich
- Contemporary Arts Center (CAC), Cincinnati
- Modern Art London, London
