= Nayland Blake =

American visual artist

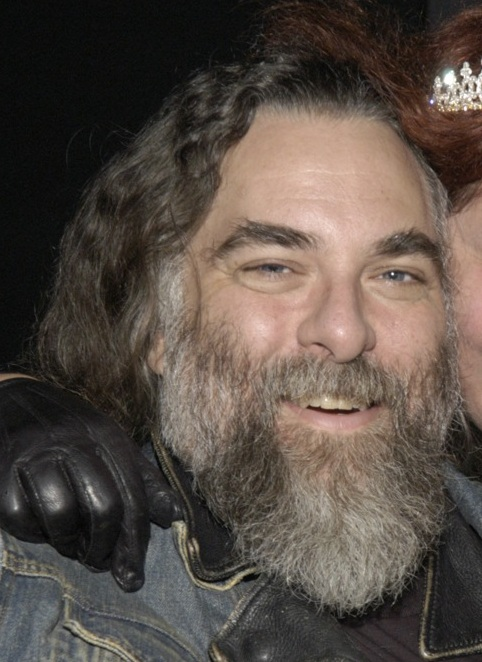
- Blake in 2008
- Born: 1960 (age 65–66); New York, New York
- Occupations: Artist and Educator
- Notable credit(s): Feeder 2 , Starting Over
- Website: naylandblake.net

Nayland Blake is an American artist whose focus is on interracial attraction, same-sex love, and intolerance of the prejudice toward them. Their mixed-media work has been variously described as disturbing, provocative, elusive, tormented, sinister, hysterical, brutal, and tender.

== Education and life ==
Nayland Blake attended Bard College in Annandale-On-Hudson, for its B.F.A. program from 1978 to 1982 and then moved to California. They attended the California Institute of the Arts, Valencia, for its M.F.A. program, from 1982 to 1984.

Since at least 2017, Blake has opted to use “they/them” pronouns, a decision that they explained was made partly in solidarity with those whose gender expression does not fit a binary, as well as a nod to their own hybrid racial and sexual identity.

== Work ==
Nayland Blake began displaying their work in 1985. Among their pieces is a log cabin made of gingerbread squares fitted to a steel frame, entitled Feeder 2 (1998). When it went on display at the Tang Teaching Museum and Art Gallery, visitors furtively nibbled off bits and pieces of the cabin's interior walls, while the smell of the gingerbread filled the gallery. Another work is Starting Over (2000), a video of the artist dancing with taps on their shoes in a bunny suit made to weigh the same as their partner at the time. The suit was so heavy that Blake could hardly move as they took choreographic directions from offstage.

Gorge (1998) is a video of the artist sitting shirtless being hand-fed an enormous amount of food for an hour by a shirtless black man from behind. In 2009, a live version of Gorge was staged in which audience members fed Blake.

Their work often incorporates themes of masochism. Gorge follows two other major threads of Blake's work: their biracial heritage—the artist's father was black—and their pansexuality.

Blake has had solo museum exhibition at the Tang Museum and was included in the 1991 Whitney Biennial and that museum's Black Male: Representations of Masculinity in Contemporary American Art exhibition in 1994. Maura Riley curated a retrospective of 30 years of Blake's art, "Behavior," which was presented in late 2008–early 2009 at Location One in New York City.

In October 2017 Nayland Blake participated in the performance series Crossing Object (inside Gnomen) hosted by the New Museum in Manhattan (2017–18). Nayland Blake dressed as Gnomen, a bear-bison creature Blake created as their "fursona." The New Museum described that Gnomen "can change sex and gender" while the furry suit represents Blake's hybrid identity.

In 2018 Nayland curated Tag: Proposals on Queer Play And The Ways Forward at Institute of Contemporary Art, Philadelphia.

Their work is in the collections of the San Francisco Museum of Modern Art, the Whitney Museum of American Art, the Walker Art Center, and the Des Moines Art Center, among others. Blake is represented by the Matthew Marks Gallery, and currently lives and works in New York City.

In 2022, Blake participated in the 2022 Whitney Biennial titled "Quiet as It's Kept" curated by Adrienne Edwards and David Breslin.

== Selected solo exhibitions ==
- FREE!LOVE!TOOL!BOX!, Yerba Buena Center for the Arts, San Francisco
- Nayland Blake: Behavior, Location One, New York, curated by Maura Reilly
- Nayland Blake, Some Kind of Love: Performance Video 1989-2002, Center for Art and Visual Culture, University of Maryland, Baltimore. Traveled to The Tang Teaching Museum and Art Gallery, Skidmore College, Saratoga Springs, NY.
- Hare Attitudes, Contemporary Arts Museum, Houston
- The Schreber Suite, MATRIX Gallery, University of California, Berkeley Art Museum
- Inscription, XS Gallery, Western Nevada Community College, Carson City, NV.

== Select publications ==
- Nayland Blake, My Studio Is a Dungeon Is the Studio: Writings and Interviews, 1983–2024. Durham, NC : Duke University Press [2025].
- Nayland Blake, Behavior. New York : Location One [2009], with essays by Maura Reilly.
- Nayland Blake, Surfaced. London : MOCA, [2008?]
- Nayland Blake, Also also also rises the sun. Calgary Alta., Canada : No Press, 2008
- Nayland Blake, Nayland Blake: some kind of love: performance video 1989-2002 / Ian Berry; with an essay by David Deitcher. Saratoga Springs, N.Y. : The Frances Young Tang Teaching Museum and Art Gallery at Skidmore College, 2003.
- In a different light : visual culture, sexual identity, queer practice / edited by Nayland Blake, Lawrence Rinder, Amy Scholder. San Francisco : City Lights Books, 1995.
- Nayland Blake, Nayland Blake: Hare Attitudes. Houston : Contemporary Arts Museum, 1996.
- Nayland Blake, The Library of Babel. Buffalo, N.Y. : Hallwalls Contemporary Arts Center, 1991.
- Nayland Blake, Brains: The journal of egghead sexuality. San Francisco : B. Works, 1990.

== Public collections ==
- Whitney Museum of American Art, New York.
- Orange County Museum of Art, Santa Ana.
- Museum of Contemporary Art, Los Angeles.
- Museum of Modern Art, New York.
- Museum of Modern Art, San Francisco.
- di Rosa Center for Contemporary Art, Napa.

== Writings ==
- Artist's blog
- Blake, N., Rinder, L., and Scholder, A. (1995)In a different light. San Francisco, CA: City Light Books.
