= Kambiz GhaneaBassiri =

Kambiz GhaneaBassiri is Professor of Religion and Politics in the John C. Danforth Center on Religion and Politics at Washington University in St. Louis. Prior to joining the faculty of Washington University in St. Louis, he was a Professor of Religion at Carleton College and the Thomas Lamb Eliot Professor of Religion & Humanities at Reed College. He is the author of A History of Islam in America: From the New World to the New World Order and Competing Visions of Islam in the United States: A Study of Los Angeles. He co-edited All Religion Is Inter-religion: Engaging the Work of Steven M. Wasserstrom and Non Sola Scriptura: Essays on the Qur'an and Islam in Honor of William A. Graham. He is a founding editor of the book series, Islam of the Global West published by Bloomsbury Academic Publishing. Both him and his books have been quoted and referred to a multitude of times. He has been named a Carnegie Scholar by the Carnegie Corporation of New York and received a Guggenheim Fellowships Award in the Humanities for his work on the mosque in Islamic history.

== Background ==
From 2002-2023, he was a professor of religion and humanities at Reed College. Currently, he is Professor of Religion at Carleton College.

One of his former students, Taliesin Myrddin Namkai-Meche, along with Rick Best and Micah David-Cole Fletcher, defended two young Muslim girls in the 2017 Portland train attack.

== Education ==
GhaneaBassiri received his B.A. summa cum laude from Claremont McKenna College in 1994. He holds an A.M. (1998) and PhD (2003) from the Committee on the Study of Religion at Harvard University.

== Written work ==
He is the author of Competing Visions of Islam in the United States: A Study of Los Angeles which is the first in-depth study of Los Angeles County's large Muslim population. The book was published in 1997. His other book, A History of Islam in America was published in July 2010. It is a widely acclaimed historical examination of the centuries-old presence of Muslims in the United States. Cambridge University press referred to it as a "pioneering work that opens a new window onto American history".

He is the co-editor of All Religion Is Inter-Religion, which engages the work of Steven M. Wasserstrom to analyze the ways inter-religious relations have contributed both historically and philosophically to the constructions of the category of “religion” as a distinct subject of study.

Selections from his scholarship on "American Muslim Activism Following the Soviet Invasion of Afghanistan" has been included in The Bloomsbury Reader on Islam in the West, edited by Edward E. Curtis. The Cambridge Companion to American Islam, edited by Juliane Hammer, Omid Safi includes a chapter by GhaneaBassiri on "Religious Normativity and Praxis among American Muslims."

== Recent activities ==
Along with Leah Wright Rigueur, author of The Loneliness of the Black Republican: Pragmatic Politics and the Pursuit of Power, he spoke at the Saint Louis University on Friday, January 20, 2017 as part of the "History, Social Justice, and the Age of Trump" discussion.

On May 30, 2017 he appeared on The Takeaway radio show to remember his student Taliesin Myrddin Namkai-Meche who died in the 2017 Portland train attack and discuss the response of the Portland community following the incident.
