= Manuela Delsors Mangrané =

Spanish painter

- Born: 1918; Tortosa
- Died: 2001 (aged 82–83)
- Occupation: artist

Manuela Delsors Mangrané (Tortosa 1918–2001), also known as Manolita Delsors, was a painter from Tortosa, Catalonia. She rose to prominence in the 1940s and early 1950s, but little is known of her life and work after this period.

== Artistic career ==
Manuela Delsors is an artistic disciple of the painters Agustí Baigés and Víctor Moya. The first known record of Manuela Delsors’ paintings is her participation in the exhibition of Tortosa artists in April 1941 in homage to Antonio Cervo and Agustín Baigés, who were murdered during the Civil War. This exhibition provided a showcase for her portraits, drawings and still lifes. The following year, in October 1942, Manuela Delsors presented a solo exhibition at Tortosa Library. One of the works displayed was Nostalgia. That same year she participated in the National Fine Arts Exhibition held in Barcelona, in which she presented a still life painting. She also held a solo exhibition in 1942 at the Sala Gaspar gallery in Barcelona, presenting a collection of portraits such as Portrait of My Mother, Portrait of My Sister, Avelina Armengol, Daniel Mangrané and other paintings including Dancers, Roses and Chinaware, Cherries and Daisies, White Cockerel and two still lifes.

In 1945 the poet, artist and journalist Josep Maria Junoy presented the catalogue of Manuela Delsors’ first exhibition in Barcelona, highlighting her great talent as a portrait painter. This major exhibition featured about thirty paintings including the portraits of her mother and sister, still lifes and figures. In January 1946 Manuela presented a solo exhibition at the Sala Gaspar gallery in Barcelona. In April 1948 she held an exhibition at the Galeria Argos gallery in Barcelona with several portraits. This successful exhibition strengthened her reputation and the economic value of her work. In 1954 she exhibited at the Cercle Català cultural centre in Madrid. This was probably her last known public exhibition.

Little is known of her work after this period but she dedicated part of her time to producing portraits for private clients such as Paquita Rico and Carmen Sevilla, two of the most well-known Spanish film stars in the twentieth century who were also famous dancers and singers.

== Family ==
She was the daughter of the lawyer Juan Antonio Delsors Piñol and Maria de la Cinta Mangrané Escardó. She was also the niece of the Tortosa-born politician, Daniel Mangrané.

== Known exhibitions ==
- 1941: Participates in the exhibition of Tortosa artists in tribute to Antonio Cerveto and Agustín Baiges
- 1942: Exhibition at Tortosa Library
- 1942: National Fine Arts Exhibition, Barcelona.
- 1942: Solo exhibition at the Sala Gaspar gallery in Barcelona
- 1945: Major exhibition in Barcelona with a total of thirty works displayed
- 1946: Presents a solo show at the Sala Gaspar in Barcelona
- 1948: Portrait exhibition at the Galeria Argos gallery in Barcelona
- 1954: Exhibition at the Cercle Català cultural centre in Madrid
