= Hessel Museum of Art =

Museum at Bard College

Coordinates: 42.0201°N 73.9141°W

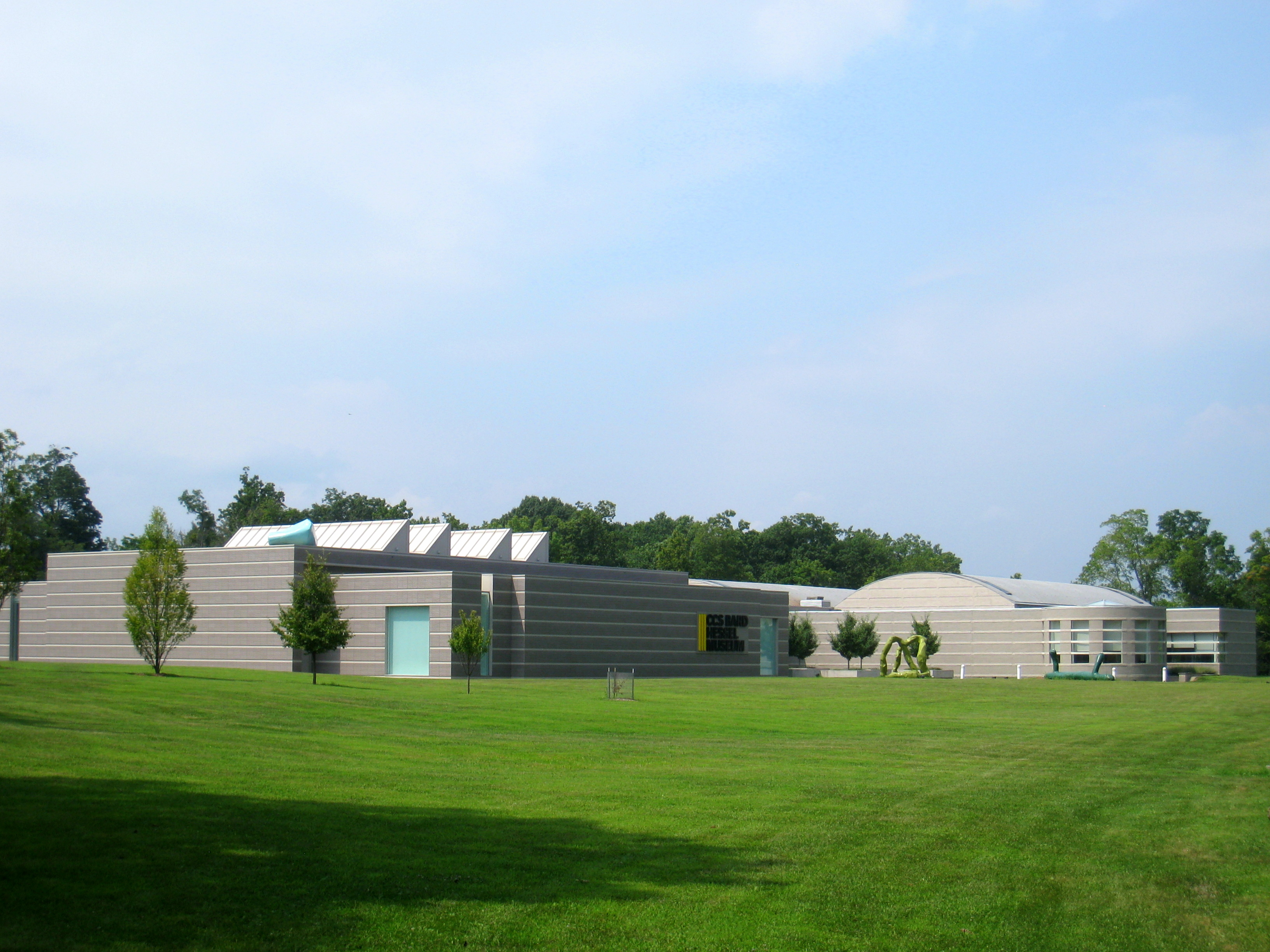
- Established: November 2006
- Location: Bard College, Annandale-on-Hudson, New York, United States
- Type: Art museum
- Collections: Contemporary art
- Collection size: 3,000
- Executive director: Tom Eccles
- Director: Ian Sullivan
- Curator: Lauren Cornell
- Architect: Jim Goettsch
- Website: ccs.bard.edu/museum

The CCS Hessel Museum of Art is an art museum located on the campus of Bard College, in Annandale-On-Hudson, New York. The museum was built in 2006. The Hessel Museum is housed in the Center for Curatorial Studies (CCS). The Museum draws from the Marieluise Hessel Collection of Contemporary Art, which contains more than 1,700 objects on permanent loan to Bard. The Hessel Museum activates the collection for research for students, faculty and the general public through exhibitions, publications, and events – on site and through digital resources.

== History ==
The Center for Curatorial Studies, Bard College was expanded and renovated in 2006 to include the Hessel Museum of Art, 17,000 feet of galleries built to accommodate its growing collections and programs. The Hessel Museum of Art opened on November 12, 2006, in Annandale-on-Hudson, New York. The CCS facility, which houses a two-year graduate program in curatorial studies, comprises several interconnected parts, including a library and archive in addition to the Hessel Museum.

The Hessel Museum of Art is named for CCS Bard founder and donor Marieluise Hessel.

In 2014, Martin and Rebecca Eisenberg donated nearly 200 artworks to the Center for Curatorial Studies. The gift includes works by Ricci Albenda, Trisha Baga, Uta Barth, John Bock, Matthew Brannon, Patty Chang, Phil Collins, Anne Collier, Martin Creed, Aaron Curry, Moyra Davey, Verne Dawson, Marlene Dumas, Roe Etheridge, Karl Haendel, Rachel Harrison, Richard Hawkins, Karen Kilimnik, Michael Krebber, Friedrich Kunath, Henry Taylor, Rirkrit Tiravanija, and Sue Williams, among many others.

== Architecture ==
The Hessel Museum shares a lobby with Bard's Center for Curatorial Studies, which houses the graduate program. Goettsch and Partners, original designers of the Center, returned to design the expansion in 2006, which now features the Hessel Museum of Art, which houses Marieluise Hessel's collection of contemporary art. Conceived with Hessel's collection in mind, the museum's square plan centers on two halls that accommodate installations. Their shared perimeter is lined by sequences of smaller spaces and a pair of single-entrance rooms.

== Monographic exhibitions ==
In addition to group exhibitions, the Hessel Museum has shown a number of monographic exhibitions, including presentations of works by Liam Gillick, Amy Sillman, Rachel Harrison, Blinky Palermo (in collaboration with Dia:Beacon), Sky Hopinka, Daniel Steegmann Mangrané, Dara Birnbaum, Martine Syms, and others.

== Student exhibitions ==
Students in CCS Bard’s graduate program are required to curate two types of exhibitions over the course of the two-year program. In First Year: Curatorial Practice, a year-long, practice-based course, first year students have the opportunity to curate works from the Marieluise Hessel Collection in their first semester.
