= Peter Zellner =

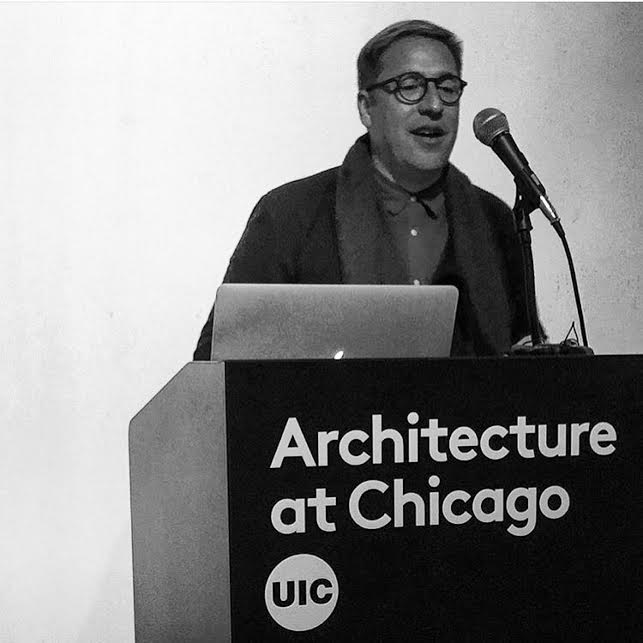
Peter Zellner lectures at the University of Illinois at Chicago, School of Architecture, Design, and the Arts

Peter Zellner (born August 3, 1969) is an American/Australian designer, professor, author, urban theorist and educator. He is the principal of ZELLNERandCompany. Between 2014 and 2015 he led AECOM's Los Angeles design studio. His work ranges from large scale city planning projects to residential design.

== Biography ==
Zellner was born in Manhattan, New York. He earned his Bachelor of Architecture with Honors from the Royal Melbourne Institute of Technology (RMIT) in 1993 and a Master of Architecture from Harvard University in 1999 where he was a participant in the Harvard Project on the City led by Rem Koolhaas.

After graduating from RMIT, Zellner established his design studio in Melbourne Australia in 1994. Zellner began teaching at RMIT in the Faculty of the Built Environment in 1994, and built his first project, Snow House in 1995. After completing his graduate studies at Harvard, Zellner taught at SCI-Arc in 1999 for one year and then returned to practice at Gensler as a Senior Consultant and later at Davis Brody Bond as a Senior Designer.

In 2004 Zellner established his own studio in Los Angeles, ZELLNERPLUS. Between 2004 and 2014 the firm designed several notable public and private art galleries, residences, institutional facilities and corporate workspaces in Los Angeles, San Francisco, Mexico and New York.

In January 2014 Zellner was appointed Design Principal and Studio Design Lead with the AECOM Los Angeles Design Studio. In 2015 Zellner established Zellner Naecker Architects with architect Paul Naecker. In 2016 Zellner established ZELLNERandCompany.

His built projects include the Matthew Marks Gallery in West Hollywood, Los Angeles and the Casa Anaya in Tijuana, B.C. Mexico.

As a teacher for twenty years, Zellner has held visiting professorships at UC Berkeley, the University of Florida at Gainesville and Ecole Spéciale d'Architecture in Paris. Zellner taught design and theory as a faculty member at the Southern California Institute of Architecture (SCI-Arc) from 1999 to 2015 where he coordinated the school's Future Initiatives Urban Design program between 2008 and 2014. In the fall of 2016, Zellner founded the Free School of Architecture, a tuition and salary free, not-for-profit organization.

Zellner's work has been featured in publications such as Architectural Record, The New York Times and Domus. He is the author of numerous essays and books including Hybrid Space (Thames & Hudson, 2000) and Pacific Edge (Thames & Hudson, 1998). He has curated exhibitions such as Sign as Surface at Artists Space and Whatever Happened to Los Angeles at SCI-Arc. A model and drawings of the Krist House by Zellner are held in the permanent architecture collection of Fonds régional d'art contemporain, FRAC CENTRE, Orléans, France.
