= Sky Hopinka =

Ho-chunk artist and filmmaker (born 1984)

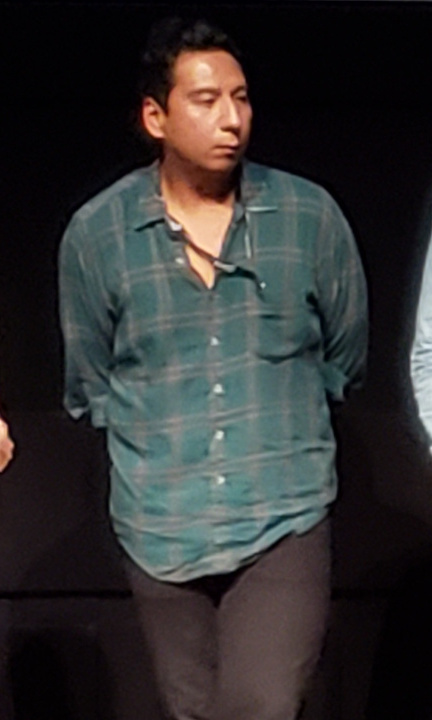
- Sky Hopinka in 2018
- Born: 1984 (age 41–42); Ferndale, Washington, US
- Citizenship: Ho-Chunk Nation; American
- Education: Portland State University, University of Wisconsin-Milwaukee
- Known for: Video art, film, animation
- Style: Experimental
- Awards: Guggenheim Fellowship (2020); MacArthur Fellowship (2022)
- Website: www.skyhopinka.com

Sky Hopinka (born 1984) is a Native American visual artist and filmmaker who is a member of the Ho-Chunk Nation and a descendant of the Pechanga Band of Indians. Hopinka was awarded a MacArthur Fellowship in 2022.

== Early life and education ==
Hopinka was born in Ferndale, Washington, and moved to Southern California as a teenager.

Hopinka's undergraduate education was at Portland State University (PSU), where he became interested in documentary film. He received a Bachelor of Arts in liberal arts. While at PSU, he started to take interest in Indigenous language revitalization.

In 2013, Hopinka moved to Milwaukee, Wisconsin, the homeland of the Ho-Chunk Nation, and enrolled at the University of Wisconsin-Milwaukee, where he received a Master of Fine Arts degree in film, video, and new genres.

== Career ==
Hopinka's work deals with personal interpretations of homeland and landscape; the correlation between language and culture in relation to home and land. Hopinka has said: "Deconstructing language [through cinema] is a way for me to be free from the dogma of traditional storytelling and then, from there, to explore or propose more of what Indigenous cinema has the possibility to look like."

His film and video work has been featured at Media City Film Festival, the Museum of Modern Art, New York, the Walker Art Center, the Tate Modern, the Whitney Biennial, Hessel Museum of Art at Bard College, Sundance Film Festival, ImagineNATIVE Film and Media Arts Festival, Toronto International Film Festival, Ann Arbor Film Festival, New York Film Festival, among others.

Hopinka organized a film program called What Was Always Yours and Never Lost focused on indigenous experimental cinema. The film series began in 2016 and was later shown at the 2019 Whitney Biennial.

== Teaching ==
Hopinka is former associate professor at Simon Fraser University in British Columbia, where he taught film, video and animation. He is currently assistant professor of Film and Electronic Arts at Bard College. He has also taught Chinuk Wawa, an Indigenous language of the Lower Columbia River Basin.

== Awards and honors ==
- 2022, MacArthur Fellowship
- 2021, residency fellowship, Forge Project, Taghkanic, N.Y.
- 2020, John Simon Guggenheim Foundation fellowship
- 2020, MacDowell (artists' residency and workshop) fellowship
- 2019, Media City Film Festival's Chrysalis Fellowship to work on post-production of małni—towards the ocean, towards the shore (2020)
- 2018–19, Radcliffe Institute for Advanced Study at Harvard University fellowship to work on to post-production work on a feature-length experimental film, titled Imał. This film has been described as "wandering through a neomythological approach to explore an Indigenous presence of language and culture in the Pacific Northwest".
- 2017, Mary L. Nohl Fund Fellowship, 2017
- 2016, More with Less Award, Images Festival
- 2015, Third Prize, Media City Film Festival
- 2015, Tom Berman Award for Most Promising Filmmaker, Ann Arbor Film Festival

== Collections ==
- Whitney Museum of American Art, New York City
- Museum of Modern Art, New York City
- Memorial Art Gallery, Rochester, New York
- National Gallery of Art, Washington, D.C.
