= Francesca Trivellato =

Italian historian

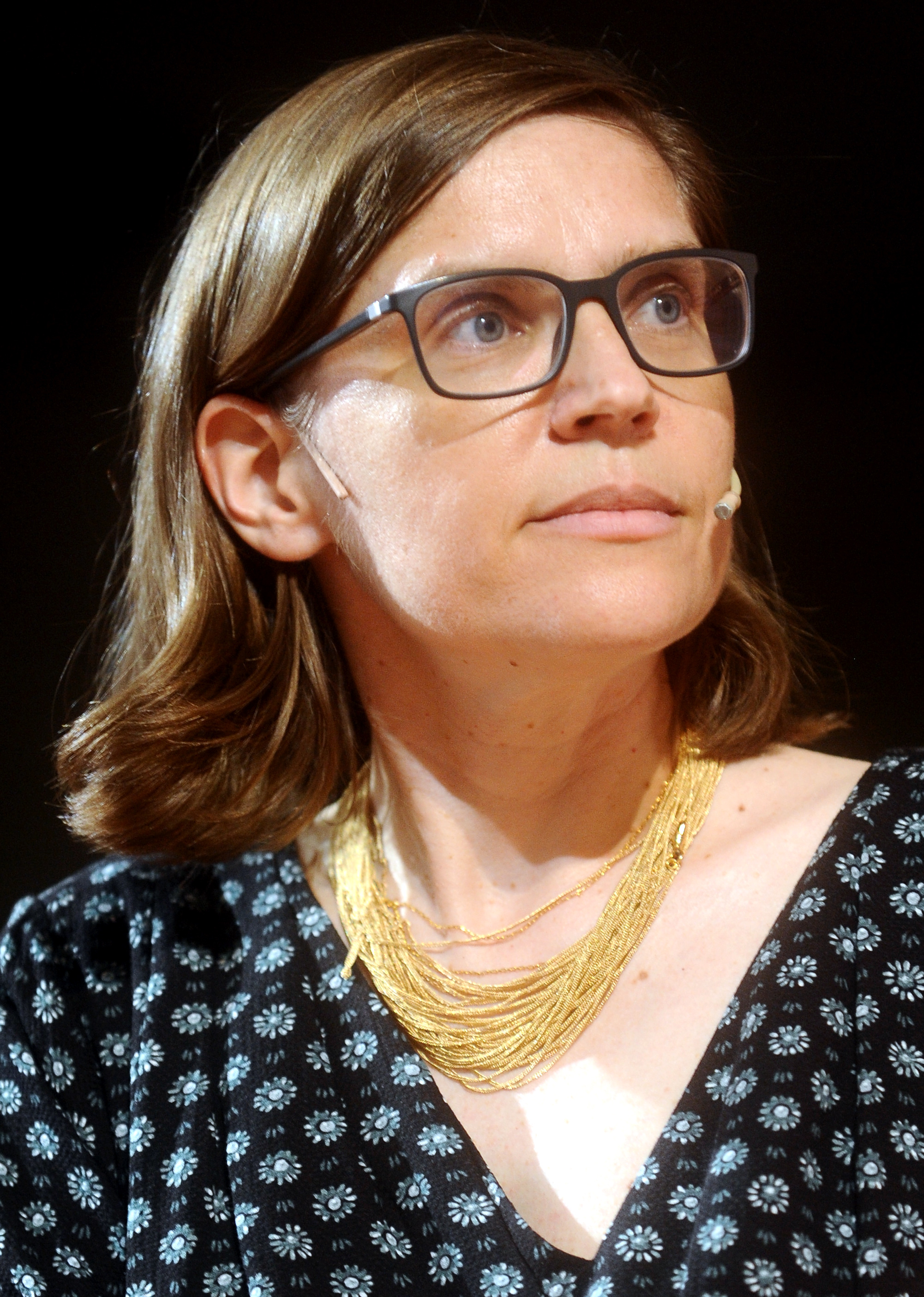
Francesca Trivellato at the Festival of Economics in Trento in 2018

Francesca Trivellato (born 1970) is an Italian historian, focusing on cultural, economic and social history in the early modern period. Her publications have covered Italian history, Jewish history and trade and cultural networks. She is currently the Andrew W. Mellon Professor in the School of Historical Studies at the Institute for Advanced Study.

== Biography ==
Trivellato was born in Padua. She received a BA in history from the Ca' Foscari University of Venice in 1995, where she worked under the supervision of Giovanni Levi. During her time as a BA student, she spent a year at the University of California Berkeley. She took a PhD in social history from Bocconi University, Milan in 1999 and a PhD in history from Brown University, Rhode Island, in 2004. At Brown she worked under the supervision of Anthony Molho.

Trivellato began working at Yale University as an assistant professor in history in 2004 and in 2007 became a full professor. In 2012, she became the Frederick W. Hilles Professor at Yale University and in 2017 the Barton Biggs professor. In 2018, Trivellato joined the Institute for Advanced Study in Princeton, New Jersey as the Andrew W. Mellon Professor at the School for Historical Studies.

Her 2009 book, The Familiarity of Strangers: The Sephardic Diaspora, Livorno, and Cross-Cultural Trade in the Early Modern Period won the 2010 Leo Gershoy Award, a Jordan Schnitzer Book Award and was long-listed for the Cundill Prize.

She was awarded with a Guggenheim Fellowship in 2012. She has held fellowships from the Radcliffe Institute for Advanced Study, the American Academy in Berlin and at the Institute for Advanced Study in Princeton, New Jersey. She was a visiting professor at the Ecole des Hautes Etudes en Sciences Sociales (EHESS), Monash University (Melbourne), Sciences Po (Paris) and Stanford.

- Jacques Barzun Prize (2020)

== Publications ==
=== Books ===
- The Familiarity of Strangers: The Sephardic Diaspora, Livorno, and Cross-cultural Trade in the Early Modern Period (2009)
- The Promise and Peril of Credit: What a Forgotten Legend about Jews and Finance Tells Us about the Making of European Commercial Society (2019)

=== Edited volumes ===
- (with Leo Halevi and Cátia Antunes) Religion and Trade: Cross-Cultural Exchanges in World History, 1000–1900 (2014)
- (with Jonathan Karp) Jews in Early Modern Europe (2019)
