= Dornith Doherty =

American artist and photographer (born 1957)

- Born: 1957 (age 68–69); Houston, Texas, US
- Education: Yale University, Rice University
- Known for: Photographic series and installations
- Notable work: "Archiving Eden"
- Awards: Guggenheim Fellowship, Fulbright, Japan Foundation
- Website: Dornith Doherty

Dornith Doherty, Seedling Cabinet III, from "Archiving Eden," Digital chromogenic lenticular print, 62" H x 42" W, 2019.

Dornith Doherty (born 1957) is an American artist and educator based in the Dallas–Fort Worth area. Her long-form projects primarily employ photography, scientific imaging and video and explore ecological, philosophical and cultural questions related to the natural world, landscape, environmental stewardship and genetic resource preservation. Her work often involves travel and research-based collaborations with biologists, botanical and environmental institutes, and archives, as in the case of her global seed banking project, "Archiving Eden." Commenting on that work, Elizabeth Avedon wrote, "As an expeditionary photographer, Doherty is equipped with an eye to document raw, unknown territory. Her work leads us to remote places most will never experience, capturing things we would never likely see. On her return, she reshapes what was discovered into poetic images that illuminate questions about life and time."

Doherty has been awarded a Guggenheim Fellowship, Fulbright Fellowship and Japan Foundation grant. Her work belongs to the public collections of the Museum of Fine Arts, Houston (MFAH), Crystal Bridges Museum of American Art, Spencer Museum of Art, and Amon Carter Museum of American Art, among others. She has exhibited at venues including the Smithsonian National Museum of Natural History, Royal Albert Memorial Museum (England), Denver Art Museum, MFAH, and Tucson Museum of Art.

== Education and career ==
Doherty was born and raised in Houston, Texas. She graduated with a dual major BA (Spanish Language and Literature, French; 1980) from Rice University, while also working with photographer Geoff Winningham. She followed with photography studies at Yale University with Tod Papageorge, Thomas Roma and Richard Benson, earning an MFA in 1988.

After graduating, Doherty taught photography at the Herron School of Art in Indianapolis before joining the art faculty of the University of North Texas (UNT) in 1996; she continues to teach there. She has received the Society for Photographic Education Insight Award (2025) and the UNT's Eminent Professor Award (2026).

Doherty has had solo exhibitions at institutions including the Galveston Art Center, Amon Carter Museum, Museum of Contemporary Art Toronto, National Academy of Sciences, Dayton Institute of Art, Jardín Botánico de Medellín, and Los Angeles County Arboretum. She has been affiliated with the Moody Gallery (Houston) and the Conduit Gallery and Holly Johnson Gallery (both Dallas), among others.

== Work and reception ==
Critics note in Doherty's work a blend of scientific rigor, poetic sensitivity and an interest in examining the nature of representation and how it conditions perception, constructs memory and identity, and organizes knowledge through systems such as archives. Critic John Zotos remarked, "[Doherty's] work registers beyond the merely photographic. At any given moment her pieces are fine art photography, conceptual art, geometric art and abstract art that comment on beauty, the natural world and environmental politics … she brings critical lenses to bear upon reality."

=== Early landscape still lifes ===
Doherty's early series focused on site-specific photographic still lifes that recalled shadow boxes or natural history museum dioramas. These projects merged photography's documentary and expeditionary modes with aesthetic interventions employing assemblage to reinterpret culturally constructed landscapes. Over roughly a decade, she photographed national parks in Costa Rica, the United States, Japan and Mexico bereft of people, then layered nature specimens and cultural artifacts onto the images or projected images onto arrangements of objects.

The Temporal Screens series (2003–05) considered the profoundly different approaches to landscape in the East and West as reflected by the historic gardens of Kyoto, Japan. In Rio Grande: Burnt Water/Agua Quemada (2002–08), Doherty examined the Rio Grande River as a complex site traversing common and divergent cultures of the U.S. and Mexico, natural, rural and urban landscapes, and issues of ecology, water access, immigration and economic inequality. The series' vivid and elegiac vignettes were created by superimposing images of the landscape onto arrangements of objects collected onsite to evoke the life and history of the river, and then re-photographing the illuminated still lifes.

=== "Archiving Eden" ===
Doherty's "Archiving Eden" (2008–present) project was inspired by the impending completion of the monumental Svalbard Global Seed Vault, a botanical backup "Noah's Ark" in Norway undertaken as a doomsday precaution to preserve global crop diversity in light of accelerating climate and extinction threats. Involving collaborations with more than twenty seed banks including Svalbard, the U.S. National Center for Genetic Resources Preservation and the Millennium Seed Bank in England, the project yielded exhibitions, a 2013 TEDx talk, and a monograph.

"Archiving Eden" features two broad types of work. Documentary images capture a quotidian institutional world embodying the scientific method: Svalbard's primordial, remote Arctic landscape; logistics of architecture, technology and security; and clinical collection rooms and vaults. Ghostly x-ray images revealing the architecture of seeds, plantlets and clones—produced using equipment at the facilities—convey a sense of poetry and wonder at the power and resilience of tiny, fragile life forms.

Doherty presents the x-ray material both straightforwardly and in reworked, vibrant digital collages and animations created by multiplying, splicing, inverting or rearranging the images in her studio; the new constructions suggest evolutionary or new genetic creations. Critics describe the collages as conveying a "spiritual" or "celestial" dimension in their geometric arrangements and forms, which evoke mandalas, biomorphic glyphs, dispersal and natural patterns, as well as scientific grids and typologies (e.g., Seedling Cabinet III, 2019). The collages range from monolithic prints to architectural installations to lenticular-printed pieces. As viewers move, the latter works (e.g., More Than This, a collage of 4,800 seeds) achieve a 3-D effect that evokes how the seeds change during preservation processes of freezing or drying.

Dornith Doherty, Establishing Wetlands in Inírida/Elaphoglossum papillosum (Estableciendo humedales en Inírida/Elaphoglossum papillosum), from "Illuminations: Ferns of Colombia," Archival pigment print, dimensions variable, 2023.

=== Botanical center projects ===
Doherty often partners with botanical centers, as in Illuminations: Ferns of Colombia (2018–present, Jardín Botánico de Medellín), a collaboration with the Botanical Research Institute of Texas. The photographic project conveyed the urgency of plant discovery in an era of ecological and social disruption in Colombia by capturing chance visual relationships between drying ferns and the Colombian newspaper pages used to press them. It included 10' x 8' prints, a 64-foot installation of transparent artworks along a building façade, large collages on glass panels installed in the garden, and a three-channel video embedded into a custom-built vertical fern garden wall. Roundabout (Circuition) (2021–23) was a collaboration with the Stephen and Peter Sachs Museum of the Missouri Botanical Garden involving agrobiodiversity in viticulture.

The outdoor, interactive installation Archiving Eden: Exchange (Los Angeles Arboretum, 2025) highlighted the shared responsibility of safeguarding biodiversity. Its transparent rectangular structure was covered with a colorful, topographical map-inspired mosaic created from more than 5,200 magnified X-ray images of California wildflower seeds. Visitors were invited to remove and keep an X-ray tile from the wall in exchange for a single seed provided by a wildflower foundation; by its close, the installation was transformed into a living seed bank containing enough seeds to save a species.

== Collections and awards ==
Doherty's work belongs to the public collections of the Amon Carter Museum, Art Museum of Southeast Texas, Brandts Museum (Denmark), Centro de Fotografía Isla de Tenerife (Spain), Crystal Bridges Museum, Dayton Art Institute, Lamar University, Martin Museum of Art, Milwaukee Art Museum, Minneapolis Institute of Arts, Museum of Fine Arts, Houston, National Academy of Sciences, National Center for Genetic Resources Preservation, and Spencer Museum of Art, among others.

Doherty was awarded fellowships or grants from the John S. Guggenheim Foundation (2012), Japan Foundation (2003), Fulbright Program (1994), Indiana Arts Commission and Society for Contemporary Photography (both 1993), among others. In 2016, she was named the year's Texas State Artist in 2D work by the Texas Commission on the Arts. She has been an artist-in-residence or artist affiliate at the Botanical Research Institute of Texas, Cary Institute of Ecosystem Studies, Museum of Contemporary Art Toronto, and U.S. Department of the Interior.
