= Eve Aschheim =

American painter (born 1958)

Eve Aschheim (born 1958) is an American abstract painter and printmaker. Her work explores the intersection of drawing, painting, and digital media, often characterized by layered compositions and a focus on the process of creation. Aschheim's art has been exhibited in numerous solo and group exhibitions, and she has received several awards and fellowships for her contributions to contemporary art.

She is also a professor at Princeton University, where she teaches visual arts.

== Life and career ==
A native of New York City, Aschheim lived in California and Singapore as a child. She studied art at the University of California, Berkeley, where she received her BA in 1984, working primarily with artists Elmer Bischoff, Joan Brown and Chris Brown. In 1987 she received her MFA at the University of California, Davis, under the instruction of Wayne Thiebaud, Harvey Himelfarb, Squeak Carnwath, Mike Henderson, Manuel Neri, and Robert Arneson. She began teaching as an adjunct lecturer in the Visual Arts Program at Princeton University in 1991 and she became full-time in 2001. From 2003 to 2007 she served as director of the Visual Arts Program, Aschheim's paintings and drawings are abstract and geometric. She is a member of American Abstract Artists.

Aschheim was married to John Yau, with whom she has a child. She lives in Manhattan.

== Exhibitions ==
Recent solo exhibitions of Aschheim's work include "Lines without Outlines", “T” Space, (Rhinebeck, NY, 2017 and Barbara Walters Gallery, Sarah Lawrence College 2018), Lori Bookstein Fine Art, NYC (2016), and Galerie Inga Kondeyne, Berlin (2015, with Hanns Schimansky). Solo museum exhibitions of her work include the Weatherspoon Art Museum, Greensboro, NC, the Bannister Gallery, Rhode Island College, the New York Studio School, and Skidmore College, Saratoga Springs, NY. Aschheim has exhibited regularly in Europe at Galerie Rainer Borgemeister, Berlin, Galleri Magnus Aklundh, Malmo, Sweden, and Galerie Inga Kondeyne, Berlin.

== Awards ==
During her career she has received fellowships from the New York Foundation for the Arts, the National Endowment for the Arts, the Elizabeth Foundation, The Joan Mitchell Foundation, and the Pollock-Krasner Foundation, and she has been awarded the Purchase Award and the Richard and Hinda Rosenthal Award, both from the American Academy of Arts and Letters. She received a Guggenheim Fellowship in 2012. In 2017 she was elected an Academician of the National Academy of Design.

== Collections ==
Three of her works, including one formerly owned by the Corcoran Gallery of Art, are in the collection of the National Gallery of Art, while six are owned by the Museum of Modern Art. Her work is also in the collection of the Museum of Contemporary Art, North Miami. Additional collections: Arkansas Art Center, Little Rock, AR; Boise Art Museum, Boise, ID; Fogg Art Museum, Harvard University; Hamburger Bahnhof, Berlin, Germany; Colorado Springs Fine Art Center; The Hood Museum of Dartmouth College, NH; Kupferstichkabinett, Nationalgalerie, Berlin; Kunstmuseum Bonn, Germany; The Lannan Foundation, Santa Fe, New Mexico; The New Mexico Museum of Art, Santa Fe, NM ; The New-York Historical Society; The Pierpont Morgan Museum and Library Contemporary Drawings Collection, New York City; The Pollock Gallery, Southern Methodist University, Dallas, TX; Princeton University Art Museum; University of Alaska, Museum of the North, Fairbanks, AK; University of New Mexico Art Museum, Albuquerque; University Museum of Contemporary Art, University of Massachusetts, Amherst; The San Diego Museum of Art; Yale University Art Museum
