= Julie Tolentino =

American artist and dancer

Julie Tolentino is a visual artist and performance installation maker. Her work is influenced by an array of visual, archival, and movement strategies.

== Life ==
Tolentino was born in San Francisco to a Filipino/Salvadoran family. She began formal dance training in ballet, modern, jazz and Contemporary dance, as well as Afro-Haitian and Flamenco. In 1980s, Tolentino moved to New York where she lived for over twenty-five years. She/They moved to the Mohave Desert and created an off-grid house/studio.

== Work ==
Tolentino was a member of the activist group ACT UP and appeared in the 1989 "Kissing Doesn’t Kill: Greed and Indifference Do" campaign with Lola Flash by the AIDS awareness artist-activist collective Gran Fury. Tolentino posed with Madonna in a series of homo-erotic photos in the book, SEX, and was a featured artist for an artist book by Rodarte photographed by Catherine Opie. From 1990–2002, Tolentino was a member of David Roussève's Dance Theatre Company, Reality.

Tolentino founded the Clit Club, a queer and pro-sex lesbian nightclub which was operational from 1990–2012. She was an AIDS activist, caregiver, events coordinator, and prominent supporter of lesbian visibility. In her own words, "My work has an inherent base in the experience of being a survivor, activist, and friend/helper/caregiver ... as I focus on the accumulation of 'small' moments and the simplicity, tenderness, reverence of these experiences as well as how they grow into sometimes overwhelming and chaotic times." Tolentino co-wrote the Lesbian AIDS Project's Women's Safer Sex Handbook, and was a founding member of ACT UP New York's House of Color Video Collective. Currently, she is the Provocations co-editor for The Drama Review (TDR) with MIT Press.

Since 1998, Tolentino has presented solo and group installations and performance work in the Whitney Biennial, New Museum, PARTICIPANT INC, The Kitchen, and Performa in New York; the Haus der Kulturen der Welt, Berlin; La Batofar, Paris, France; Momenta and Monkey Town Gallery; Madre Museo, Naples, Italy; Walker Arts Center; the Los Angeles Contemporary Exhibitions;

In 2013, Tolentino staged the solo exhibition Raised by Wolves at Commonwealth and Council in Los Angeles, which included over 50 intimate, interactive performances alongside a series of site-specific sculptures. In 2019, the artist mounted her second exhibition at the Koreatown gallery, REPEATER, an "immersive installation incorporating sculpture, video, and 108 hours of performance."

In 2019 Tolentino created the performance REPEATER, a performance that totaled to 108 hours over the course of 6 weeks at Commonwealth and Council. The artist performed in the space every Thursday, Friday, and Saturday from noon to six. The room was darkened with white carpet. Objects occasionally used in performance were spread throughout the room including a sawhorse covered in black latex gloves, mirrors on casters, wire sculptures, etched mirror cubes, and large neoprene bags.

Tolentino was included in the 2022 Whitney Biennial. For the exhibition they collaborated with Ivy Kwan Arce to create a work with glass orbs, satellites, and performance.
