= David Churchman =

American academic

David Churchman (born 1938) is a California State University Professor and Chairman Emeritus of Behavioral Science and Professor of Humanities recognized for numerous educational innovations.

== Biography ==
Raised in Teaneck, New Jersey, David Churchman completed his bachelor's and master's degrees at the University of Michigan and his doctorate at the University of California, Los Angeles. Before accepting the appointment at California State University, he served as an infantry company commander and regimental assistant adjutant, social worker in California, high school teacher in Morocco and Pennsylvania, research associate at University of Southern California, program officer at National Science Foundation, and designed a culturally-based preschool curriculum for Native American children for Tribal American Consulting Corporation. He has lived in or traveled to over 125 countries as an educator, researcher, or tourist. He taught in Morocco, received a doctoral fellowship from the U.S. Department of State, has been a Fulbright Scholar in Cyprus, Ukraine and at the Nobel Peace Institute in Norway, and a Malone Scholar in Saudi Arabia, and conducted comparative research on zoo visitors in Australia, Singapore and the United States. He is married to Altantsetseg Agvandorj, originally from Mongolia, and has one married son with two sons of his own.

While teaching in Pennsylvania, he developed an eleventh-grade curriculum that integrated topics across all subjects. Shortly after completing his doctorate, he devised the evaluation system for National Drug Abuse Training Center. While at USC he was the evaluation specialist on the team that created the Emmy-winning PBS-TV program, Freestyle, which encouraged young girls to study mathematics and science.

While at California State University, with two others he expanded his course on negotiations into one of the first graduate degrees in the country in Conflict Management in 1982, chairing it until retiring in 2003. Seven years later, working with the campus Director of distance learning he again broke new ground by combining interactive television and the Internet to make the degree accessible worldwide, enabling his department to produce 10% of all degrees awarded by the university with 2% of the faculty budget. In addition, he helped to initiate the California Academy of Mathematics and Science and to design and initiate a degree in Travel and Tourism, and updated the masters program in gerontology. In 1982, after an apprenticeship as a movie exotic animal trainer working primarily with big cats, elephants, and raptors, he co-founded Wildlife on Wheels with Millicent Wood, which presented live wild animal environmental education programs to approximately 100,000 children each year in the Los Angeles basin, did rescue work on oiled seabirds after some three-dozen oil spills including Exxon Valdez, and occasionally provided animals for television and movies.

He was a founding director of Birute Galdikas’ Orangutan Foundation and was the environmental representative on the California Citizens’ Advisory Panel for the Bureau of Land Management. For a dozen years, he wrote a bi-monthly column on theoretical and applied military problems for Fire and Movement under the pseudonym of the Armchair General. He is the author or co-author of over $6 million in successful grant proposals and over 200 papers, articles, chapters and books including Negotiation: Process, Tactics Theory, Why We Fight: The Origins, Nature and Management of Human Conflict, and Developing Graduate Theses and Projects in the Humanities.

He retired to Oregon in 2003, where he is a member of the Oregon Selective Service Board and Rotary International and continues to write, and to volunteer for the Oregon Shakespeare Festival and local Community Emergency Response Team.

=== David Churchman Works with Wildlife - Picture Gallery ===
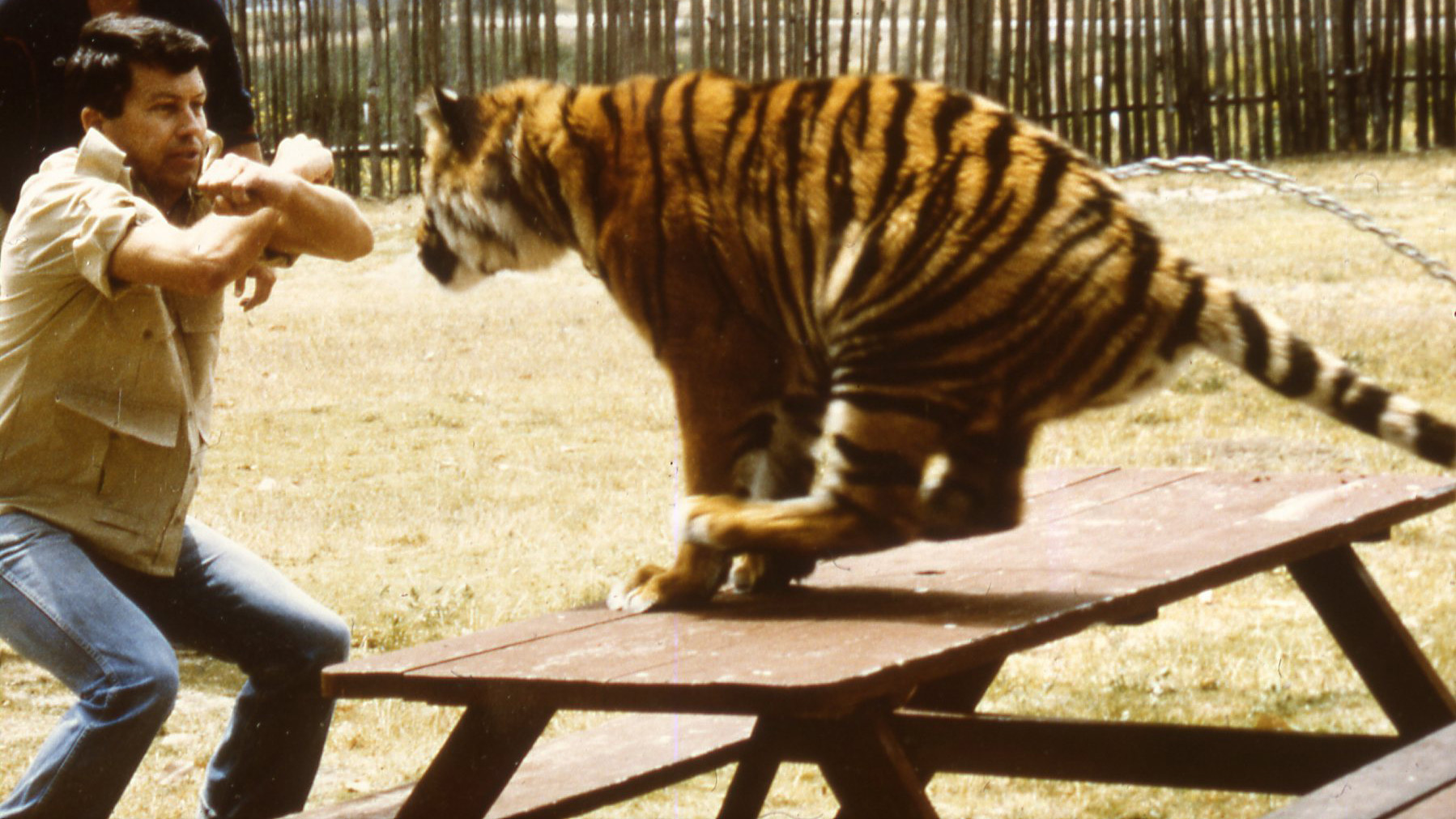
Training a tiger to do "hits" for movies

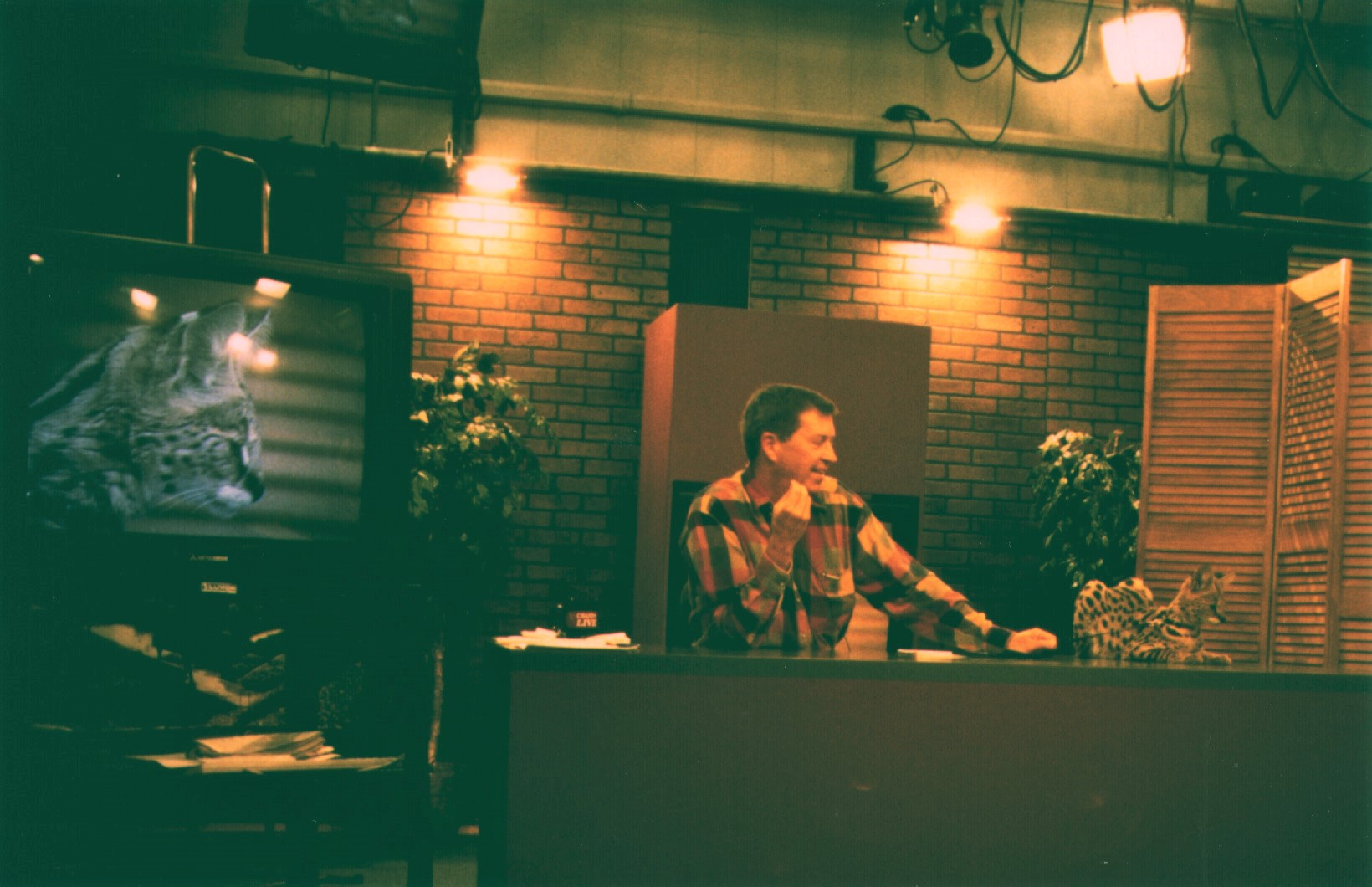
Teaching a televised class with guest Serval, a small African cat

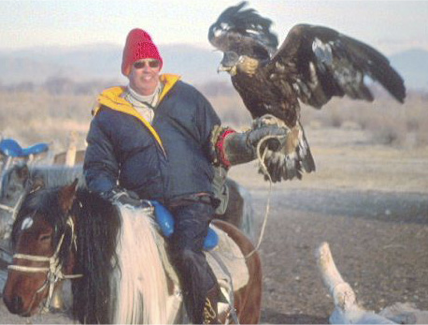
Eagle hunting in Mongolia

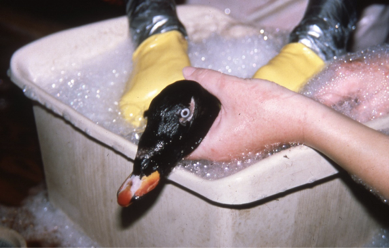
Cleaning a duck after an oil spill
