= Daniel Wiener =

American sculptor (born 1954)

- Born: 1954 (age 71–72); Cambridge, Massachusetts, United States
- Occupation: Sculptor
- Known for: 1982-present

Daniel Wiener (born 1954) is an American sculptor currently living and working in New York. He is the recipient of a Guggenheim Fellowship and a New York Foundation for the Arts Grant.

== Education and work ==
Wiener attended Brown University and the University of California, Berkeley (B.A. 1977) as well as the Whitney Museum Independent Study Program (1982-1983).

Since the early 1980s Wiener has been known for his multicolored, multi-textured sculptures that straddle the abstract and the representational. Blake Gopnik remarked that, "Wiener’s work escapes being just another instance of formalist abstraction. It seems deeply immersed in real-world materials and forms, as works linked to 'low' craft often do.". Early on in his career Wiener showed a deftness for texture, for example making hard elements appear soft, or vice versa, which in turn played with the viewers' tactile responses to the work. Early forms, though not quite representational, were neither fully abstract. An early review by David Pagel in Artforum describes, "A loopy parade of pre-oedipal playthings surrounded the visitor to Daniel Wiener’s jam-packed exhibition of unnameable sculptural objects."

Over the years, Wiener's amorphic objects inched towards becoming more 'nameable' ones, as they began adopting more anthropomorphic or utilitarian qualities. Of this shift Kathleen Whitney noted, "The small, almost figurative details in his current imagery represent an evolution from his previous work, which was always referential, psychological, and biomorphic in nature." Such consistent qualities have also drawn comparisons to the work of Claes Oldenburg, Jean Dubuffet and Mike Kelley.

Wiener's primary material is Apoxie-Sculpt, a resin that, that sets into a claylike texture and preserves the saturated, wet look of acrylic paint. In a 2015 review in The New York Times of his exhibition Kooks and Villains at Lesley Heller Gallery, critic Roberta Smith stated that, "This veteran sculptor excels at manipulating [the] malleable material." Made up of both freestanding furniture-referencing objects and wall reliefs faces, the works in the exhibition showed Wiener's ability to generate a great variety of forms from the same material starting point. In addition to sculpture, Wiener's practice also includes ink drawings, watercolors, and animations. His works on paper- which possess many of the color qualities found in his sculptures- address how color may dictate shape, prompting one critic to state that, "Daniel Wiener is in essence a painter’s sculptor."

== Exhibitions ==
Wiener has exhibited nationally and internationally with solo exhibitions at Lesley Heller Gallery, New York, NY; Acme Gallery, Santa Monica, CA; Holly Solomon Gallery, New York, NY; Germans Van Eck Gallery, New York, NY; The McKinney Avenue Contemporary, Dallas, TX; Feigen Gallery, Chicago, IL; Vadstrup & Bie, Copenhagen, Denmark; and Barbara Farber, Amsterdam, Holland; among others.

His work has been included in group exhibitions at a range of venues including: BRIC Arts Media, Brooklyn, NY; Mixed Greens, New York, NY; Jeff Gleich Gallery, Paris, France; Nevada Institute of Contemporary Art, Las Vegas, NV; Oakland Museum of California, Oakland, California; Art in General, New York, NY; MoMA PS:1, Long Island City, NY; SculptureCenter, Long Island Island; NY.

== Awards and fellowships ==
- 2017 Dieu Donné Workspace Residency
- 2015 Tree of Life Grant
- 2013 Alpert Award Ucross Residency
- 2012 Guggenheim Fellowship
- 2005 Pilchuck Glass School Residency
- 1995 New York Foundation for the Arts Grant
- 1981 Yaddo Residency

== Public collections ==
- Brown University, Providence, Rhode Island
- Museum of Contemporary Art San Diego, San Diego, California
- Santa Cruz Museum of Contemporary Art, Santa Cruz, California
- Museum van Hedendaagse Kunst, Gent, Belgium
- Peco Energy, King of Prussia, Pennsylvania
