= Dave McKenzie (artist) =

Dave McKenzie is a visual and performance artist born in Kingston, Jamaica. Recent solo exhibitions include “Dave McKenzie: Everything’s Alright, Nothing’s Okay!” at the Rosenwald-Wolf Gallery at the University of the Arts, Philadelphia, PA; “Dave McKenzie,” at the Aspen Art Museum in Aspen, Colorado; “Screen Doors on Submarines,” REDCAT, Los Angeles; and “Momentum 8: Dave McKenzie,” The Institute of Contemporary Art, Boston. McKenzie's work was included in “Etched in Collective History,” at the Birmingham Museum of Art, Birmingham, AL; “Radical Presence: Black Performance in Contemporary Art,” at the Contemporary Arts Museum Houston, Houston, TX; “Prospect.1” New Orleans, LA; and in other group exhibitions at the RISD Museum, Providence, RI; the New Museum, New York, NY; the Indianapolis Museum of Art, Indianapolis, IN, in “The Studio Museum in Harlem, NY; The Kitchen, New York, NY; and at the Brooklyn Museum of Art, Brooklyn, NY. He received a Foundation for Contemporary Arts Grants to Artists award (2018).

== Education ==
In 2000, he earned a BFA in printmaking from the University of the Arts in Philadelphia, Pennsylvania, and attended the Skowhegan School of Painting and Sculpture.
