= Lisa Saltzman =

American photographer

- Born: New York
- Website: lisasaltzmanphoto.com

Lisa Saltzman is an American photographer known for both her commercial and fine art photography.

== Career ==
Saltzman began her photographic career running an advertising and promotional merchandise company in which she created much of the work she produced. Her affinity for the arts was inspired by her parents who are collectors and art patrons. Later on, she studied contemporary arts at Christie's and the International Center of Photography. She has had a commercial photography career, including being elected a board member of the New York chapter of the American Photographic Artists. Her commercial clients include The Guggenheim Museum, Estée Lauder, MAC Cosmetics, Rimmel, and HBO.

She has made abstract, anonymous portraits of NYC dwellers caught in motion; dark, moody staged portraits of various models; and abstract street photography shot through translucent materials to create various levels of obfuscation.

== Awards ==
- 2016 – Honor of Distinction (3rd place) – 12th B&W Spider Awards, Fine Art Professional
- 2017 – Honorable Mention – Prix de la Photographie Px3, Fine Art Professional
- 2018 – 2nd Place, Merit of Excellence – 13th B&W Spider Awards, Abstract Professional

== Exhibitions ==
=== Group shows ===
- 2016 – Black + White 2016, Center for Fine Art Photography, Fort Collins, CO
