= Matthew Marks Gallery =

Art gallery in New York City

Coordinates: 40°44′55.82″N 74°0′18.85″W

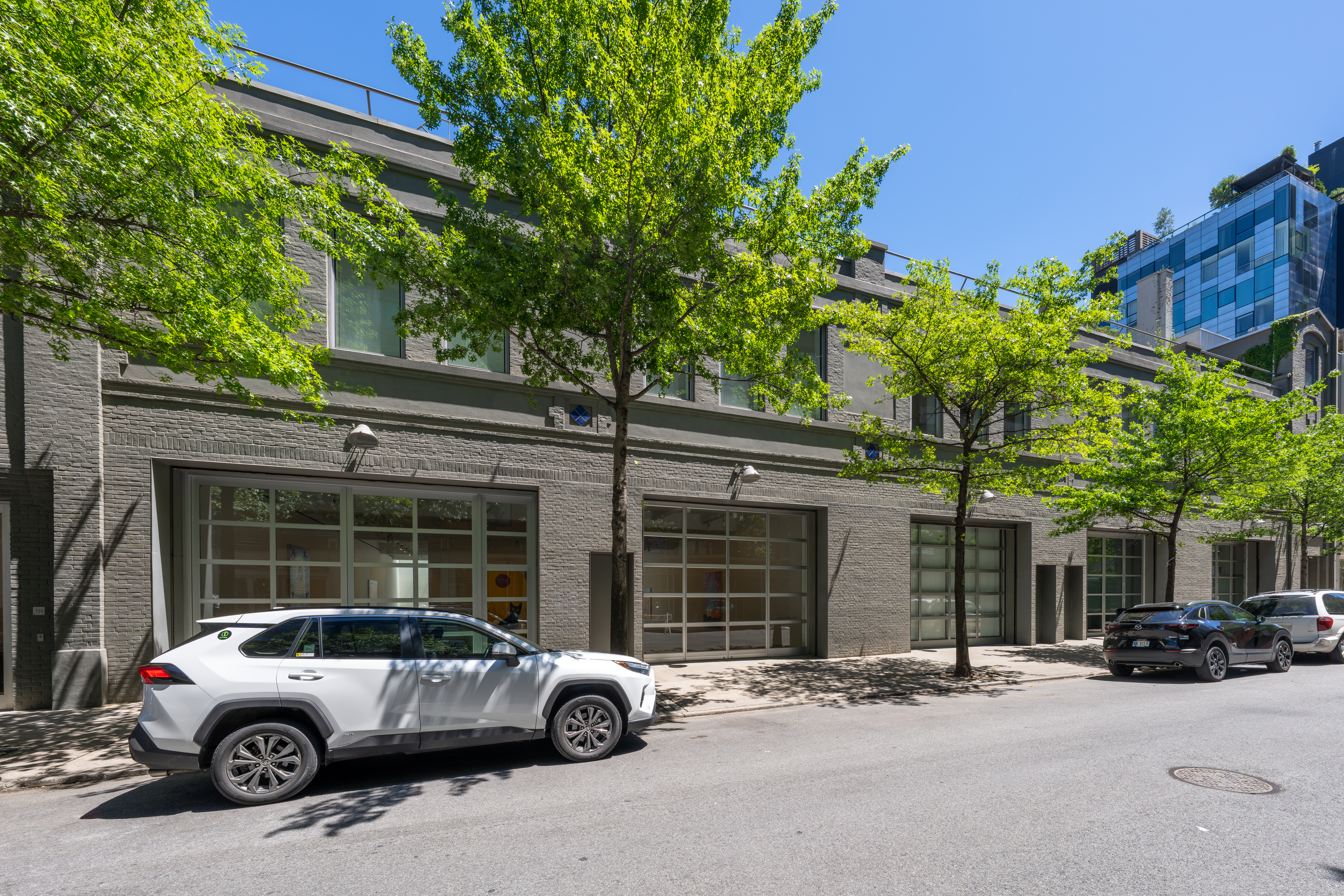

Matthew Marks is an art gallery located in the New York City neighborhood of Chelsea and the Los Angeles neighborhood of West Hollywood. Founded in 1991 by Matthew Marks, it specializes in modern and contemporary painting, sculpture, photography, installation art, film, and drawings and prints. The gallery has three exhibition spaces in New York City and two in Los Angeles.

== History ==
Matthew Marks worked for the Pace Gallery in New York City and Anthony d'Offay in London prior to opening his own gallery. After working for three years at d'Offay, Marks moved back to New York City to open his own gallery, a 1,000 square feet (93 m^{2}) space on Madison Avenue. The Matthew Marks Gallery had its first exhibition, Artists' Sketchbooks, in February 1991, including Louise Bourgeois, Francesco Clemente, Jackson Pollock, and Cy Twombly.

Matthew Marks Gallery opened its first space in Chelsea — a converted single-story garage with skylights at 522 West 22nd Street — in 1994, with a show of Ellsworth Kelly. In 1996, the gallery teamed up with two other galleries – Gladstone Gallery and Metro Pictures – to acquire and divide up a 29,000 sq ft (2,700 m^{2}) warehouse at 515 West 24th Street. By 1997, the gallery closed its space on Madison Avenue. Over the following years, two more spaces in Chelsea were added. Since 1998, Matthew Marks Gallery and another gallery—first Pat Hearn Gallery (1998), later Greene Naftali Gallery (2008, 2018)—have organized "Painting: Now and Forever", a large-scale, ongoing survey of contemporary painting, every 10 years.

In 2012, Matthew Marks Gallery opened two locations in West Hollywood, Los Angeles, both designed by Peter Zellner.

== The Armory Show ==
In 1994, the Gramercy International Art Fair, now called The Armory Show, made its debut in New York's Gramercy Park Hotel. Four dealers and gallerists, Pat Hearn, Colin de Land, Matthew Marks and Paul Morris, worked together to bring in a younger generation of downtown artists who were working through the recession that plagued the 1980s. Mark Dion's Lemonade Stand (1996), Andrea Fraser's Museum Highlights: A Gallery Talk (1989), May I Help You (1991), and Renée Green's The Pigskin Library (1990) debuted at the art fair.

== Artists ==
Matthew Marks represents living artists, including:

- Darren Almond (since 2000)
- Nayland Blake (since 1993)
- Leidy Churchman (since 2018)
- Vija Celmins (since 2015)
- Alex Da Corte (since 2021)
- Trisha Donnelly (since 2015)
- Katharina Fritsch (since 1994)
- Robert Gober (since 2002)
- Gary Hume (since 1991)
- Jasper Johns (since 2005)
- Simone Leigh (since 2021)
- Julien Nguyen (since 2019)
- Charles Ray (since 2006)
- Terry Winters (since 1996)
- Peter Fischli David Weiss (since 1998)

In addition, the gallery manages various artist estates, including:

- Peter Cain
- Ellsworth Kelly (since 1992)
- Michel Majerus
- Ken Price (since 2002)
- Anne Truitt

In the past, the gallery has worked with the following artists and estates:

- Nan Goldin (1992–2018)
- Andreas Gursky (1996–2010)
- Roni Horn (from 1992)
- Peter Hujar
- Brice Marden (1991–2017)
- Tony Smith (until 2017)
- Hiroshi Sugimoto
- Sam Taylor-Wood (from 2000)
