= Kölnischer Kunstverein =

Art museum in Cologne, Germany

Coordinates: 50°56′10″N 6°56′38″E

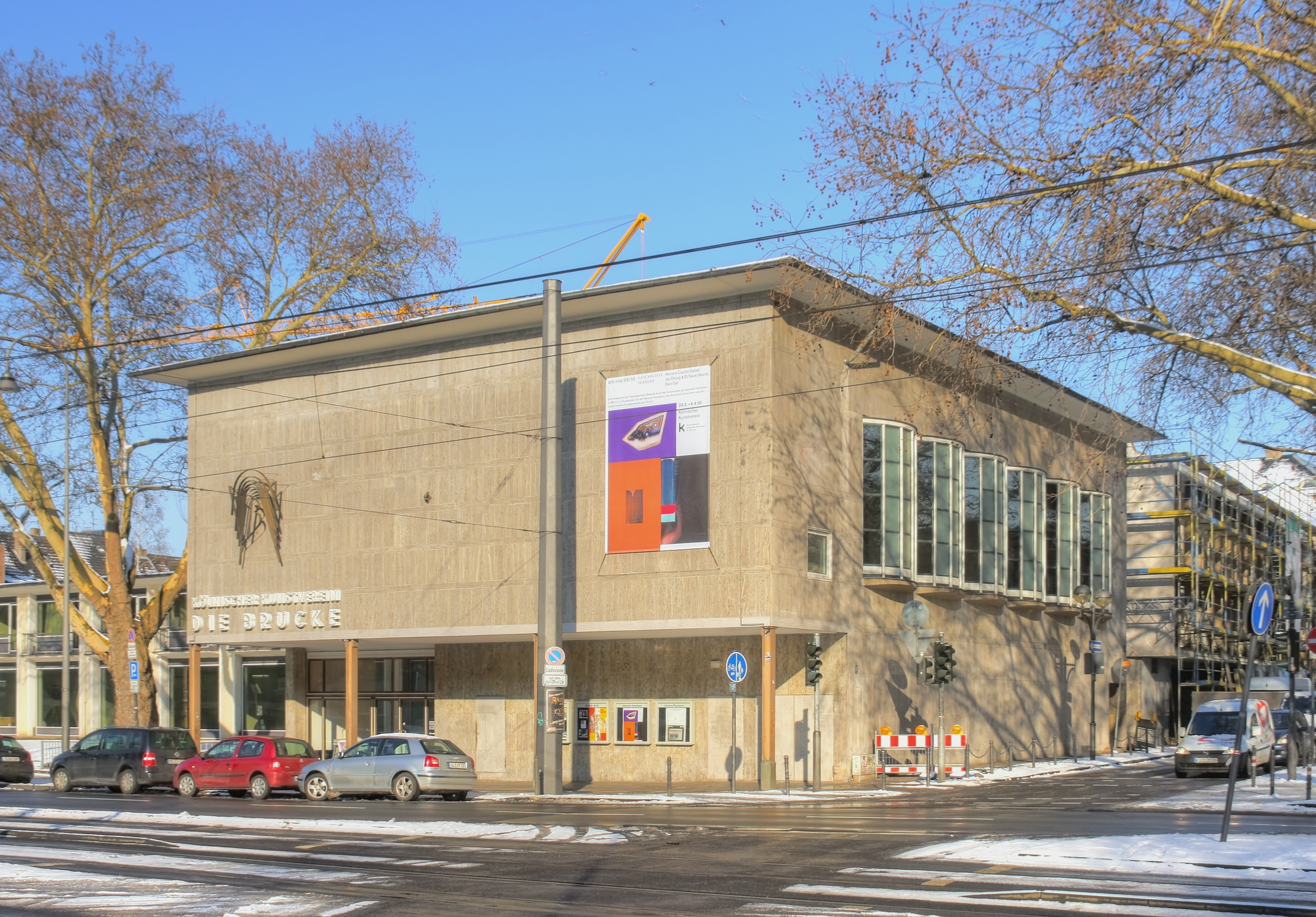
"The Bridge house"

Kölnischer Kunstverein

The Kölnischer Kunstverein is an art museum in Cologne, North Rhine-Westphalia state, Germany. It is named after the historical art society of the same name.

The Kölnischer Kunstverein was a "Kunstverein" established in Cologne in 1839 and is one of the oldest institutions for contemporary art in Germany.

In the 20th century, the Kölnischer Kunstverein held exhibitions of works by Hans Arp in 1919, Paul Klee in 1932, and Fluxus artists in the 1970s.

The building that housed the Kölnischer Kunstverein and its exhibitions was demolished in 2002. The Kölnischer Kunstverein now generally refers to that building and the history of the society.
