= Daniel Steegmann Mangrané =

Catalan visual artist (born 1977)

- Born: 1977 (age 47–48); Barcelona
- Occupation: Artist

Daniel Steegmann Mangrané (born 1977) is an artist living in Rio de Janeiro. He has used several techniques and materials, and is interested in nature and climate crisis as a field of research and work. His work has been presented in several biennales like Lyon, Berlin, New York, Paris, Porto Alegre and São Paulo, and is present in international collections like Fundació La Caixa, Serralves Museum and Barcelona Museum of Contemporary Art.

== Solo exhibitions ==
- Museu de Arte Moderna, Rio de Janeiro (2015)
- Medellín Museum of Modern Art (2016)
- Serralves Foundation, Porto (2017)
- Fundació Antoni Tàpies, Barcelona (2018)
- Center for Curatorial Studies, Bard College, New York State (2018) (curated by Lauren Cornell)
- Nottingham Contemporary (2019)
- Institut d'art contemporain, Villeurbanne/Rhône-Alpes (2019)
- Hangar Bicocca, Milan (2019)
- Kunsthalle Münster (2020)
- Barcelona Contemporary Art Museum (2023)
