= Olivia Remie Constable =

American historian

- Born: June 13, 1961; Boston, Massachusetts, US
- Died: April 16, 2014 (aged 52); Indiana, US
- Spouse: Matthew Bell
- Children: 2
- Awards: John Simon Guggenheim Memorial Foundation Fellowship

Academic background
- Education: BA, Near Eastern Languages and Literature, 1983, Yale University; PhD, Near Eastern Studies, 1989, Princeton University
- Thesis: At the edge of the West: international trade and traders in Muslim Spain (1000-1250). (1989)

Academic work
- Institutions: University of Notre Dame; Columbia University

Olivia Remie Constable (1961–2014) was an American historian. She was the Robert M. Conway Director of the Medieval Institute and professor of history at the University of Notre Dame.

== Early life and education ==
Remie Constable was born on June 13, 1961, in Boston to parents Evhy and Giles Constable. At the age of 16, she participated in an archaeological dig at the New Mexican Salmon Ruins as one of the youngest workers there. She earned her Bachelor of Arts degree in Near Eastern Languages and Literature from Yale University in 1983 and her PhD in Near Eastern Studies from Princeton University in 1989.

== Career ==
Upon receiving her PhD, Remie Constable joined the faculty at Columbia University until 1995 when she accepted a position at the University of Notre Dame (UND). While at UND, Remie Constable published her first book titled Trade and Traders in Muslim Spain: The Commercial Realignment of the Iberian Peninsula 900-1500 which received the 1998 John Nicholas Brown Prize. The book explored Iberian international trade from the tenth to the fifteenth century, with a specific focus on Muslim and Christian countries.

In 2003, Remie Constable published her third book titled Housing the Stranger in the Mediterranean World: Lodging, Trade, and Travel in Late Antiquity and the Middle Ages through the Cambridge University Press. As a result of her academic achievements, Remie Constable was appointed the Robert M. Conway Director of the Medieval Institute and elected a Fellow of the Medieval Academy of America in 2009. In the same year, she was one of two members from the United States elected to sit on the Bureau of Medieval Institutes Federation Board for a five-year term. Remie Constable also received a John Simon Guggenheim Memorial Foundation Fellowship to study Medieval and Renaissance History in 2012.

Remie Constable died on April 16, 2014, as the result of cancer. Her final book To Live Like a Moor: Christian Perceptions of Muslim Identity was published posthumously in 2018 through the University of Pennsylvania Press. In her honor, the Medieval Academy of America established the Olivia Remie Constable Award to fund a junior faculty member, adjunct, or unaffiliated scholar's research and travel.

== Selected publications ==
- Trade and Traders in Muslim Spain: The Commercial Realignment of the Iberian Peninsula 900-1500 (1994)
- Medieval Iberia: Readings from Christian, Muslim, and Jewish Sources (1997)
- Housing the Stranger in the Mediterranean World: Lodging, Trade, and Travel in Late Antiquity and the Middle Ages (2003)
- To Live Like a Moor: Christian Perceptions of Muslim Identity in Medieval and Early Modern Spain (2018)
