= Matt Connors (artist) =

American artist (born 1973)

- Born: 1973 (age 52–53); Chicago, U.S.
- Education: Bennington College, Yale School of Art
- Known for: Painting
- Movement: Abstract painting

Matt Connors (born 1973, Chicago) is an artist working predominantly in abstract painting. He lives and works between New York and Los Angeles. His work is represented by Xavier Hufkens in Brussels, Herald St. in London, and Ortuzar Projects in New York.

== Background ==
Matt Connors studied Fine Art at Bennington College before completing his MFA at Yale University School of Art in New Haven, graduating in 2006. His work draws upon the history of painting and processes, particularly minimalism and abstraction, but is also influenced by design, poetry, writing and music. In 2012, Connors published the award-winning book A Bell is a Cup and in 2015 he was a resident at the [Chinati Foundation], Marfa, Texas. In 2024 Connors was awarded the Rome Prize in Visual Arts at the American Academy in Rome.

== Exhibitions ==
Connors' work has been exhibited at MoMA PS1, New York, L'Almanach - Le Consortium - Dijon, Kunsmuseum Bonn, Kunsthalle Düsseldorf, the Walker Art Center, Minneapolis, Xavier Hufkens, The Modern Institute, Glasgow and the Museum of Contemporary Art, Detroit.

== Collections ==
His artwork is part of the public collections of the Museum of Modern Art, New York, the Hammer Museum, Los Angeles, the Walker Art Center, Minneapolis, the Dallas Museum of Art and the San Antonio Museum of Art in Texas.
