= Adrienne Edwards =

American curator, scholar, and writer

Adrienne Edwards is a New York–based art curator, scholar, and writer. Edwards is currently the Engell Speyer Family Curator and Director of Curatorial Affairs at the Whitney Museum of American Art.

== Career ==
Edwards curated performance commissions at Performa from 2010 to 2018. From 2016 to in 2018, Edwards worked as curator at large at the Walker Art Center in Minneapolis. In 2016, she curated a show Blackness in Abstraction, at Pace Gallery. In 2019, Edwards with Danielle A. Jackson curated an exhibition at the Whitney: Jason Moran, the first museum survey devoted to the MacArthur-winning pianist and conceptualist. Edwards received a Ph.D. in performance studies from New York University. She previously taught art history and visual studies at New York University and The New School.

=== Whitney Biennial 2022 ===
In October 2019, the Whitney Museum announced that Adrienne Edwards and David Breslin would curate the 2022 Whitney Biennial. She is the official co-curator alongside David Breslin for Quiet as It's Kept, the eighteenth iteration of the landmark exhibition. The 2022 Whitney Biennial officially opens to the public on April 6, 2022.

=== Writing ===
Edwards authored the catalog for Blackness in Abstraction, the group exhibition she organized at Pace Gallery; as well as, contributing to the "Carrie Mae Weems: The Kitchen Table Series" and Ellen Gallagher's catalog Accidental Records. Edwards was the performance reviews editor for the journal of feminist theory Women & Performance.

== Other activities ==
Edwards chaired the juries that selected Kapwani Kiwanga for the Frieze Artist Award (2018) and Simone Leigh and Sonia Boyce for awards at the Venice Biennale (2022). In 2019, she nominated Yto Barrada for the Prince Pierre Foundation's International Contemporary Art Prize; the prize ultimately went to Arthur Jafa though.

Other activities include:

- Institute for Contemporary Art at VCU, Member of the Advisory Board (since 2019)
- Denniston Hill, Member of the Advisory Board
