= Diego Rivera Gallery =

Art gallery in San Francisco, US

Coordinates: 37.803909°N 122.417219°W

The Diego Rivera Gallery houses Diego Rivera's 1931 mural, The Making of a Fresco Showing the Building of a City. It is located on the campus of the California Academy of Studio Arts (CASA), the former San Francisco Art Institute (SFAI) campus. It served as SFAI’s lecture hall and main exhibition space, later became the student-directed art gallery, and closed permanently in 2021.

== History ==
Located off the courtyard of the 1926 Bakewell & Brown campus of the California Academy of Studio Arts (CASA), the Diego Rivera Gallery is a rectangular hall with a gabled roof peak, roughly 32 to 35 feet tall and is approximately 1,500 to 2,000 square feet. It was originally used as a social hall and dining room with an attached kitchen for the California School of Fine Arts (CSFA; San Francisco Art Institute). In 1930, San Francisco Art Association (SFAA) President William Gerstle commissioned Diego Rivera to paint the mural at the CSFA campus. The dining room was relocated to a smaller area off the courtyard, and the space was redesignated as a lecture hall and main exhibition gallery. This allowed the preparatory work for the fresco to begin in the larger lecture/gallery, which required an added "furred" wall in front of the structural concrete support wall to ensure the plaster adhered well and to protect the fresco from dampness that could seep through the wall.

Initially, Rivera was offered a more modest location for the mural on the second-floor courtyard wall. He would receive a fee of $1,500, but he found that location “not at all suitable”. He required the much larger central wall in the larger space to realize his vision and would paint the 32.6-foot (9.93-meter)-tall by 29.81-foot (9.08-meter)-wide wall for the same price. By the time the work was completed, for reasons not quite clear, he was paid $2500, plus another $500 for his preparatory drawings. He began painting the fresco on May 1, 1931, completed it when he signed and dated the mural in the lower-right section on May 31, 1931, and a reception and formal unveiling were held on August 11th.

== Mural ==
Diego Rivera’s The Making of a Fresco Showing the Building of a City is a buon fresco, that is colored with hand-ground metal oxide pigments mixed with water and applied with a brush to wet plaster in what’s called a giornata, the area painted in a single day. This site-specific and self-referential work of art that depicts a "mural within a mural" showing both the construction of a modern city and the act of creating the fresco itself. As if the whole project is under constant construction, a trompe-l'œil wooden scaffolding lies in front, dividing the space into three sections. The center section focuses on the working class, with a giant portrait of a blue-collar worker spanning the height of the mural in progress. Rivera himself sits on the scaffolding, his back to us, as his workers put down more fresh plaster for him to paint. Directly under Rivera, on the bottom level of the center section, architect, patron, and board member of the San Francisco Art Association (SFAA) Timothy Pflueger is shown on the left, looking at architectural plans. Next to him is William Gerstle, SFAA President, who commissioned the work. On the right, pipe in hand, is Arthur Brown, a noted Bay Area architect who designed the campus. Flanking the giant blue-collar worker are the two other sections showing construction workers using their skills to build the city, while others work in specialized crafts such as engineering and drafting.

The mural became known as The Making of a Fresco Showing the Building of a City; that name was given after Rivera finished the work and independently of the artist, and there is no record of the artist giving it that title or any other. Because the mural was conceived and executed for an art school, Rivera saw it as less about building any particular city and more about the creative act of construction and planning, whether in a building or a mural.

=== Covering and uncovering ===
With enrollment down and a reputation for being a conservative art school, the school’s board, under the San Francisco Art Association (SFAA), brought in Douglas MacAgy, director of the San Francisco Museum of Art (now the San Francisco Museum of Modern Art), to reinvent the California School of Fine Arts (CSFA) as a place for a modern art education. They made MacAgy the director in 1945. As part of CSFA’s initiative to usher in the Modern Art era, MacAgy envisioned the Diego Rivera lecture/gallery as a dedicated space for modernist exhibitions. To support that use, he had a drop ceiling installed in the high-ceilinged space and had the mural covered with an added wall. Although it is not quite clear when exactly this happened, we know that by 1950 this was how the school’s dedicated gallery space looked. The false ceiling and wall remained until 1957, when both were removed. That left a lower wall below the main body of the mural, covering only the legs of the painted trompe-l'œil wooden scaffolding that extended to the gallery floor. This also created more wall space for exhibitions of hanging work while allowing the mural to be viewed once again. In the late 1960s, a full-length curtain on a track was installed so the mural could be easily covered when desired, to focus on the exhibited work. Around 1982, the curtain and lower wall were removed at the request of a conservationist working on the mural, and neither was replaced.

=== Conservation ===
The Diego Rivera mural requires ongoing attention due to surface grime and the effects of aging. The grime and aging layers cause the colors to fade and the fine brushwork to be lost, and they physically damage the plaster surface. To prevent further deterioration of the work, periodic cleaning and some surface repair will be required. Bloch and Dimitroff started the work in 1986, and their notes recorded a student prank in which a hammer and sickle was painted over the worker's red badge. The white residue (thought to be toothpaste or something similar) used to paint the badge was removed by Bloch and Dimitroff. Inge-Lise Eckmann did some further conservation work on the fresco in 1997 and returned to the work from 2001 to 2004. In 2021, the Mellon Foundation awarded SFAI a $200k grant to fund the conservation, digitization, research, and public programming. Site & Studio Conservation did the conservation work, which also included a lighting and climate control investigation. Cultural Heritage Imaging was brought in to do the archival digitization and high-resolution 3D documentation (producing orthomosaics and Digital Elevation Models). The work was completed prior to SFAI's April 2023 bankruptcy filing.

=== Landmark status ===
By 2020, the San Francisco Art Institute (SFAI) faced impending closure due to a $19.7 million debt from a defaulted loan for an expansion of its Fort Mason satellite campus and budget deficits. With all other options no longer feasible, the school looked to its most valuable asset: the Diego Rivera 1931 mural, The Making of a Fresco Showing the Building of a City, valued at $50k, as a way to keep the school operational. It was reported that Star Wars filmmaker George Lucas had serious interest in it, as he wanted it for his yet-to-open Lucas Museum of Narrative Art in Los Angeles. After much public outcry over the murals' proposed removal, San Francisco Supervisor Aaron Peskin argued that selling the artwork would harm San Francisco's cultural heritage. He blocked the potential sale of Diego Rivera's 1931 mural by sponsoring legislation to designate the mural itself as a city landmark. On January 12, 2021, the San Francisco Board of Supervisors voted unanimously to initiate landmark designation as San Francisco Landmark No. 294. This designation restricts the mural’s removal or sale.

The Making of a Fresco Showing the Building of a City (1931) is one of four fresco murals in the San Francisco Bay Area painted by Mexican artist Diego Rivera.

== Student gallery ==
The gallery provided an opportunity for BFA, MFA and Post-Baccalaureate students to present their work in a gallery setting, to use the space for large-scale installations, or to experiment with artistic concepts and concerns in a public venue. Exhibitions changed weekly and were open on Tuesdays. About 40 shows per year were scheduled, and close to 200 students were exhibited each year.

In ex-faculty member Charles Boone's time at SFAI, he attended nearly every opening reception.

Following the closure of San Francisco Art Institute in 2022, the gallery was permanently closed.
