= Eva Díaz (art historian) =

Art historian

- Born: 1977 (age 48–49); Puerto Rico
- Education: Princeton University, University of California, Berkeley
- Occupations: Art historian, university teacher, writer
- Employer: Pratt Institute
- Notable work: After Spaceship Earth: Art, Techno-utopia, and Other Science Fictions, The Experimenters: Chance and Design at Black Mountain College
- Website: evadiaz.net

Eva Díaz is an art historian, critic, and writer. She is a professor of contemporary art at Pratt Institute in Brooklyn, New York.

== Early life and education ==
Eva Díaz was born in 1977 and grew up in Puerto Rico. She received her B.A. from the University of California, Berkeley in 1998, followed by an M.A. (2003) and a Ph.D. (2009) from Princeton University. She attended the Telluride Association Summer Program, the Whitney Independent Study Program (ISP), and was also a faculty member at the Whitney ISP from 1999–2008.

== Career ==
Her book The Experimenters: Chance and Design at Black Mountain College was published by University of Chicago Press in 2015. Focusing on the notion of experimentation at Black Mountain College, the book analyzes the works and teachings of Josef Albers, John Cage, and R. Buckminster Fuller, was reviewed widely and was cited in The New York Times and The Wall Street Journal.

Her second book After Spaceship Earth: Art, Techno-utopia, and Other Science Fictions was published by Yale University Press in 2025, and concerns the legacy of R. Buckminster Fuller in contemporary art, and ways of exploring futurity and ecological justice beyond the current tendency toward the privatization of outer space exploration.

She is the editor of Dorothea Rockburne (2024), published by Dia Art Foundation and Yale University Press, which focuses on Rockburne's prolific career, and in particular the artist's interests in topology and set theory.

Díaz has curated numerous exhibitions, including at the Asheville Art Museum, Smack Mellon, as well as a film series on Puerto Rican science fiction at the Rockaway Film Festival, and has contributed to publications such as Aperture, Art in America, Artforum, Frieze, Grey Room. Harvard Design Magazine, New Left Review, and October. She has made media appearances on the Getty Recording Artists Podcast hosted by Ahmed Best, the E-Flux podcast hosted by Elvia Wilk (author of Oval), PBS, and The Brian Lehrer Show. The importance of her work in the field of contemporary art and art criticism has been profiled in E-Flux, among other publications.

She also worked as a curator at Art in General, and has taught or lectured at schools including MIT, Sarah Lawrence College, Parsons School of Design, Yale University, the School of Visual Arts, as well as the Whitney ISP.

== Awards ==
Díaz is the recipient of the Andy Warhol Foundation Arts Writers Grant from Creative Capital, grants from the Graham Foundation, the Mellon Foundation, the Huntington Library, the Jacob K. Javits Fellowship, and a College Art Association Fellowship. She was a Getty Scholar at the Getty Research Institute in 2023–2024.

== Publications ==
- Diaz, Eva and Beth Stryker (2006). Mind the Gap. Smack Mellon, New York. OL23037401M
- Diaz, Eva (2015). The Experimenters: Chance and Design at Black Mountain College. University of Chicago Press. ISBN 978-0-226-06798-8
- Diaz, Eva, ed. (2024). Dorothea Rockburne. Yale University Press. ISBN 978-0-300-27890-3
- Diaz, Eva (2025). After Spaceship Earth: Art, Techno-Utopia, and Other Science Fictions. Yale University Press. ISBN 978-0-300-27570-4
