= Anderson Ranch Arts Center =

- Formation: 1966
- Founder: Paul Soldner
- Type: Nonprofit art center
- Location(s): 5263 Owl Creek Road, Snowmass Village, Colorado, United States
- Coordinates: 39.2142°N 106.937°W
- Website: andersonranch.org

Anderson Ranch Arts Center is a nonprofit arts organization founded in 1966 and located in Snowmass Village, Colorado, United States. The center hosts an artist residency program, summer arts workshops and a January workshop intensive.

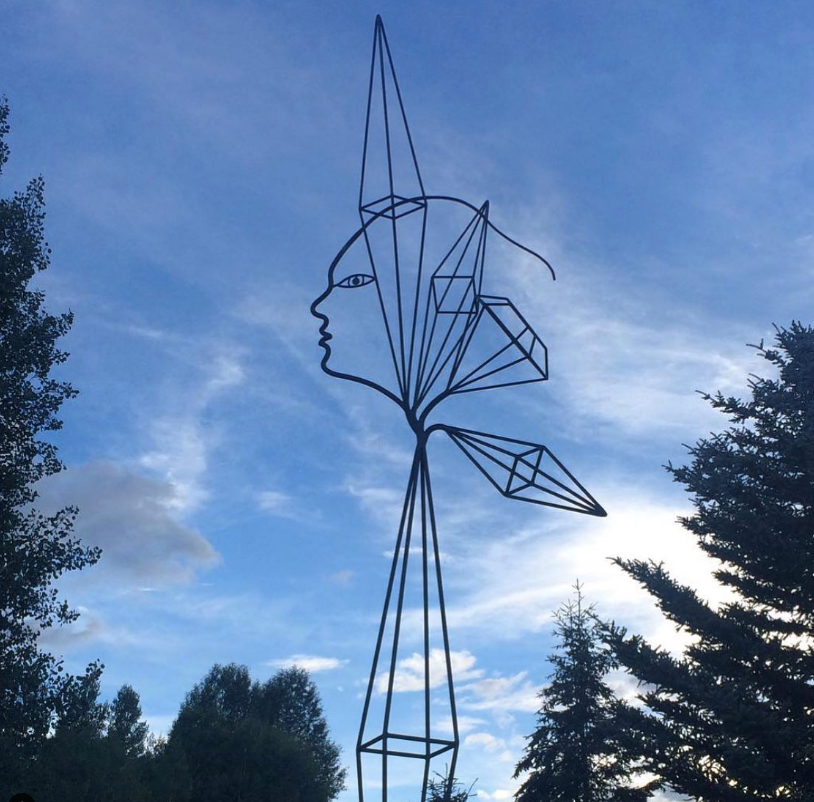
James Surls sculpture on campus.

== About ==
The campus is five acres in size with working studio space in historic buildings for ceramics, painting, printmaking, drawing, photography and new media, sculpture, furniture making and woodworking as well as a digital fabrication lab, library, café, gallery and a lecture hall. The Ranch invites visiting artists, critics and curators year-round.

Anderson Ranch hosts many public events throughout the year, such as the Summer Series: Featured Artists & Conversations, Lunchtime Auctionettes, Guest Faculty Lectures, the Annual Art Auction and Recognition Dinner, as well as indoor and outdoor exhibitions. The Aspen Art Museum and Aspen Institute are nearby significant arts institutions located in the Roaring Fork Valley.

== History ==
Located in the Rocky Mountains, just 8 miles west of Aspen, Colorado, the art center was formerly a working sheep ranch settled by Swedish immigrants in the late 19th century. Hildur Hoaglund Anderson, born in 1907 in Aspen, was the youngest child of the family that built and lived in the current campus buildings. Anderson Ranch became a community and enclave for visual artists in 1966 when it was founded by ceramic artist Paul Soldner. Other early artists involved were Dennis Hopper, Sally Mann, Daniel Rhodes, Jim Romberg, Toshiko Takaezu, James Surls, and Charmaine Locke. The center became a nonprofit in 1973 and started offering an artist residency program in 1985. In 1990, the campus buildings and barns were relocated to their current locations designed by architect Harry Teague. Takashi Nakazato, a 13th-generation master potter from Karatsu, Japan, where he is recognized as a living national treasure, has been creating ceramics at Anderson Ranch in a designated Visiting Artist studio since 1994.

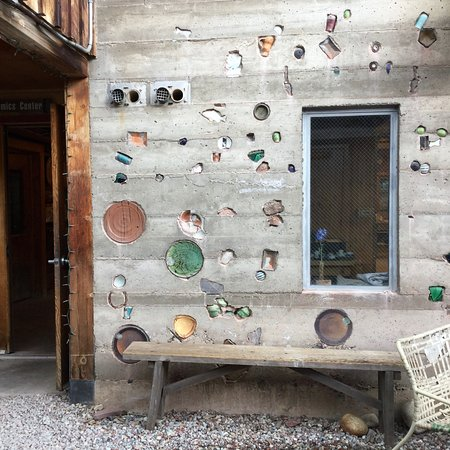
Soldner Ceramics Center studio wall with inlayed ceramics outside the kiln yard.

The ceramics program has a long artistic connection with the New York State College of Ceramics at Alfred University and the furniture and woodworking program has a similar creative history with San Diego State University and RISD. Past summer faculty have included Mickalene Thomas, Catherine Opie, Judy Pfaff and Wendy Maruyama, among many others. Anderson Ranch is amongst the few remaining arts and crafts schools across the U.S. located in historically unique architecture like Haystack Mountain School of Crafts in Maine, Penland School of Craft in North Carolina and Arrowmont School of Arts and Crafts in Tennessee.

Since 1978, Anderson Ranch Editions has published limited edition prints in etching, lithography, woodcut, and silkscreen with visiting artists including Steve Locke, Tom Sachs, Hiroki Morinoue, Nina Katchadourian, Roy Dowell and Laurie Anderson. One of the lithographs Anderson created with Bud Shark at Anderson Ranch became the cover art for her second studio album Mister Heartbreak released in 1984.

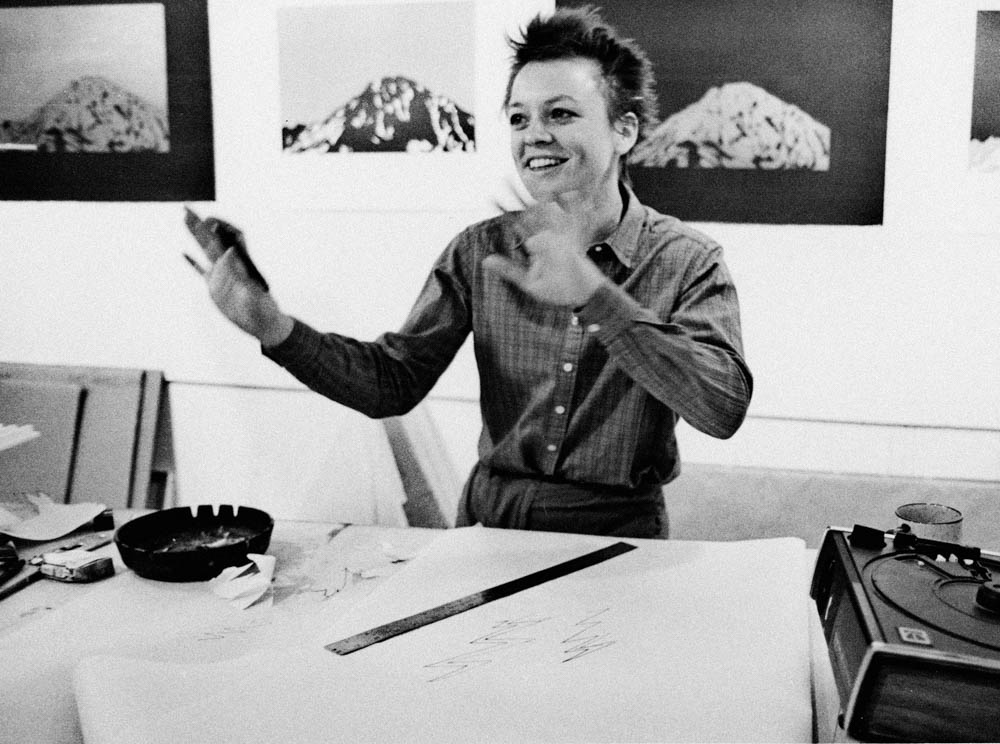
Laurie Anderson working in the Patton Print Shop in 1982.

Since 2019, the art center has hosted a curator-in-residence. The inaugural curator was Helen Molesworth from 2019–2021. Douglas Fogle was curator-in-residence from 2022–2023. The outdoor sculpture gardens on campus have displayed works by Isamu Noguchi, Sanford Biggers, Letha Wilson and Hank Willis Thomas.

== International Artist Award ==
Since 1997, the International Artist Award is given to globally-recognized artists who demonstrate the highest level of artistic achievement and whose careers have fundamentally influenced contemporary art. Past honorees include:

- 2025: Titus Kaphar
- 2024: Charles Gaines
- 2023: Christian Marclay
- 2022: Yinka Shonibare
- 2021: Simone Leigh
- 2019: Nick Cave
- 2018: Ai Weiwei
- 2017: Wangechi Mutu
- 2016: Carrie Mae Weems
- 2015: Frank Stella
- 2014: Theaster Gates
- 2013: Bill Viola
- 2012: Kara Walker
- 2011: Laurie Simmons & Carroll Dunham
- 2010: Betty Woodman & George Woodman
- 2009: Cindy Sherman
- 2008: George Condo
- 2007: Enrique Martínez Celaya
- 2005: Vik Muniz
- 2004: Laurie Anderson
- 2003: Maya Lin
- 2002: Elizabeth Murray & Robert Holman
- 2001: Christo & Jeanne-Claude
- 2000: Peter Voulkos
- 1999: Betye Saar
- 1998: Sam Maloof
- 1997: Paul Soldner
