= Oval (disambiguation) =

An oval is a curve resembling an egg or an ellipse.

Oval, The Oval, or variations may also refer to:

== Arts and entertainment ==
- Oval (musical project), German electronic music project
- Oval (novel), a 2019 novel by Elvia Wilk
- The Oval (TV series), a 2019 TV series on BET created by Tyler Perry

== Mathematics and technology ==
=== Computing ===
- Open Vulnerability and Assessment Language

=== Mathematics ===
- Cassini oval
- Oval (projective plane)

== Places and venues ==
=== Populated areas ===
==== Singapore ====
- The Oval, Singapore, a road within Seletar Aerospace Park off Seletar Aerospace Drive

==== United Kingdom ====
- Oval, London, a district in South London
  - Oval (ward), an electoral ward
- Oval Road, a street in Camden Town, London

==== United States ====
- Oval, North Carolina, an unincorporated community
- Oval, Pennsylvania, a census-designated place
- Oval City, Ohio, an unincorporated community
- Oval Park, Visalia, California, a neighborhood

=== Lawns ===
- Old Oval, also known as the Kenneth A. Shaw Quadrangle since 2010, a central lawn on the Syracuse University campus
- Oval (Stanford University), an oval-shaped sunken lawn on the Stanford University campus, Stanford, California, United States
- The Oval (Ohio State University), a large green area in the center of the university

=== Sports venues ===
==== Cricket ====
- Adelaide Oval, in Australia
- Kensington Oval, in Barbados
- Kensington Oval, Dunedin, a cricket ground in New Zealand
- The Oval, in London
- The Oval (Llandudno), a cricket ground in Llandudno, Conwy, Wales
- University of Otago Oval, a cricket ground in New Zealand

==== Football ====
- Perth Oval, in Australia
- The Oval (Belfast), in Northern Ireland
- The Oval (Eastbourne), in England
- The Oval (Wednesbury) (defunct), in England

==== Ice skating ====
- Guidant John Rose Minnesota Oval, a multi-use ice facility in Minnesota, United States
- Olympic Oval, a speed skating rink in Calgary, Alberta, Canada
- Oval Lingotto, an indoor arena in Turin, Italy
- Speed skating rink
- Utah Olympic Oval, a speed skating rink in Salt Lake City, Utah, United States

==== Other sports venues ====
- The Oval (Prestwick), a public park and sports facility in Scotland
- The Oval (Caernarfon), a multi-use stadium in Caernarfon, Wales
- The Oval (Wirral), an athletics stadium in Bebington, Merseyside, England
- Oval track, in automobile racing

=== Other places ===
- Oval Office, the official office of the President of the United States
- Oval tube station, situated near the Oval cricket ground in London, England
- The Oval (Limassol), a commercial use high-rise building in Limassol, Cyprus

== Sports ==
- Cricket oval, a type of sporting ground
- Australian rules football playing field

== Other uses ==
- Oval sticker, unofficial name of the International vehicle registration code

== See also ==
- Ellipse (disambiguation)
