= Geri Montano =

American artist from California

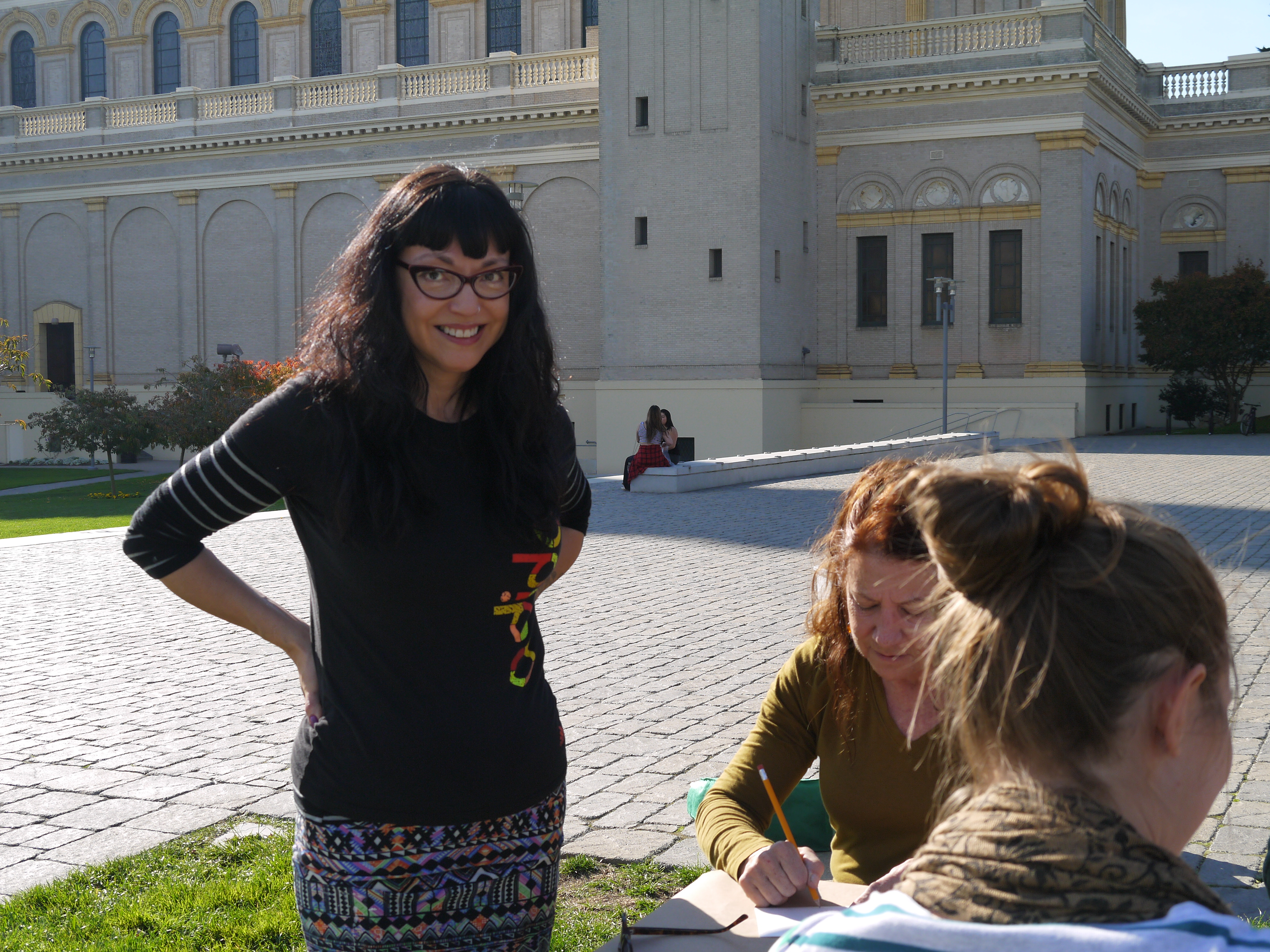
- Geri Montano leads an art activity, along with artist and writer Tyler Peyron who also leads a poetry/spoken word workshop
- Born: Geralyn Marie Montano
- Citizenship: American
- Education: San Francisco Art Institute
- Website: gerimontano.com

Geri Montano, otherwise known as Geralyn Marie Montano, is a contemporary American artist who incorporates themes of Native American heritage, feminism, and societal issues into her work.

== Biography ==
She attended the San Francisco Art Institute, where she graduated with a BFA degree in interdisciplinary arts in 1997. She currently works as an art instructor for Creativity Explored in San Francisco.

== Exhibitions ==
=== Solo ===
- "Resistance in the Land of Red Apples" at Humboldt State University (November 2018)
- "Traded Moons" at Galeria de la Raza (throughout April 7 - May 12 of 2012)
  - second showing - "FAX" at the San Francisco Arts Commission Gallery (2012)

=== Group ===
- "Cinco y Cinco/Five and Five" at the Mexican Museum (2016)
- "Processing War and Trauma" at the Kearny Street Workshop (San Francisco, CA in 2013)
- "N.D.N. Native Diaspora Now" in the Galeria de la Raza (San Francisco, CA in 2012)
- "Chicana/o Biennial" at the MACLA (San Jose, CA in 2012)
- "PACHANGA" in the Galeria de la Raza (San Francisco, CA in 2011)
- "Doll Sculpture Show" in the Seattle Center (Seattle, WA in 2002)
- "Requiem for Mother" at the San Francisco Arts Institute - Diego Rivera Gallery (San Francisco, CA in 1997)
- "Student Sculpture Show" at the San Francisco Arts Institute - Diego Rivera Gallery (San Francisco, CA in 1996)

== Permanent collections ==
- A is for Apple; I is NOT for Indian, Crocker Art Museum
- Three Moons and the Fruit of her Womb, Crocker Art Museum
- Moon Dreaming, the Mexican Museum

== Honors and awards ==
- Native American Arts & Cultural Traditions—Creative Capacity grant (2011)
- Native American Arts & Cultural Traditions grant from the San Francisco Arts Commission (2012)
