= Elision (disambiguation) =

Elision is the omission of one or more sounds in a word or phrase.

Elision may also refer to:

- Elision (music), a concept in the analysis of 18th- and 19th-century Western music
- ELISION Ensemble, a chamber ensemble specialising in contemporary classical music
- Elision (French), the suppression of a final unstressed vowel
- Copy elision, a compiler optimization technique that eliminates unnecessary copying of objects

== See also ==
- Elisionism, a philosophical standpoint encompassing various social theories
- Ellipsis (disambiguation)
- Elysian (disambiguation)
- Elysium (disambiguation)
