= Helen Molesworth =

American curator of contemporary art (born 1966)

- Born: 1966 (age 59–60); Chickasaw, Alabama
- Citizenship: American
- Known for: art historian and curator
- Spouse: Susan Dackerman

Academic background
- Education: University at Albany, Cornell University
- Thesis: At Home with Duchamp: The Readymade and Domesticity (1998)

Helen Anne Molesworth (born 1966 in Chickasaw, Alabama) is an American curator of contemporary art based in Los Angeles. From 2014 to 2018, she was the Chief Curator at The Museum of Contemporary Art (MOCA) in Los Angeles.

== Early life and education ==
Raised in Flushing, Queens, and Forest Hills, Queens, by a textile artist mother, who worked in the menswear industry, and an English professor father, who taught at Queens College, Molesworth graduated from Stuyvesant High School.

After graduating from the State University of New York at Albany, Molesworth entered the Whitney Museum’s Independent Study Program. In 1997, she earned a Ph.D. in Art History from Cornell University.

== Career ==
=== Early career ===
As head of the Department of Modern and Contemporary Art at the Harvard University Art Museums, she presented an exhibition of photographs by Moyra Davey and ACT UP NY: Activism, Art, and the AIDS Crisis 1987–1993. While Curator of Contemporary Art at the Baltimore Museum of Art from 2000 to 2002, she arranged Work Ethic, which traced the problem of artistic labor in post-1960s art. From 2002 to 2007 she was the Chief Curator of Exhibitions at the Wexner Center for the Arts where she organized the first U.S. retrospectives of Louise Lawler and Luc Tuymans, as well as Part Object Part Sculpture, which examined the influence of Marcel Duchamp's erotic objects.

=== ICA Boston, 2010–2014 ===
From 2010 to 2014 Molesworth was the Barbara Lee Chief Curator at the Institute of Contemporary Art (ICA) Boston, where she assembled one person exhibitions of artists Steve Locke, Catherine Opie, Josiah McElheny, and Amy Sillman, and the group exhibitions Leap Before You Look: Black Mountain College 1933–1957, Dance/Draw, and This Will Have Been: Art, Love & Politics in the 1980s.

=== MOCA LA, 2014–2018 ===
Molesworth was the Chief Curator at The Museum of Contemporary Art (MOCA), Los Angeles, 2014–2018. After her arrival in Los Angeles in 2014 she reinstalled MOCA's permanent collection galleries, co-organized a survey exhibition of Kerry James Marshall that traveled to Chicago, New York, and Los Angeles, organized Anna Maria Maiolino’s first US retrospective, and forged a partnership between MOCA and The Underground Museum. Her final exhibition at MOCA was a 2018 exhibition One Day at a Time: Manny Farber and Termite Art, which traced the legacy of Farber's "termite art" ideology on a wide range of contemporary artists, including many from Molesworth's own curatorial history.

In March 2018, Molesworth was abruptly fired from MOCA, due to what the museum called "creative differences." Catherine Opie, a MOCA board member, reported that museum director Philippe Vergne had said he fired Molesworth for "undermining the museum." Molesworth has long spoken publicly about the lack of diversity and equity in art institutions and the difficulties she has encountered in mounting exhibitions by non-male artists and artists of color—in a lecture to the UCLA Design Media Arts department on January 18, 2018, she said: "I don’t think there’s any way for MOCA to not be a white space. Not gonna happen. The DNA is too deep. We don’t have anyone of color on our board. Let’s start right there." In a 2019 Cultured Magazine article by Sarah Thornton, Moleswoth said of the incident: "It was a total debacle."

=== Recent career ===
From 2019 to 2021, Molesworth was the curator-in-residence at Anderson Ranch Arts Center in Colorado.

Molesworth has organized shows about the artists Noah Davis in 2020 and Ruth Asawa in 2021 at David Zwirner Gallery. Also in 2021, she curated the exhibition "Feedback" at the Jack Shainman Gallery's The School space in Kinderhook, housed in a former high school. The 21-artist show examined the history taught in American schools through the issues left insufficiently addressed in educational curricula, most notably race, and continues Molesworth's critique of institutional spaces and power structures.

In 2022, Molesworth was awarded the Clark Prize for Excellence in Arts Writing alongside Hilton Als by the Clark Art Institute. There were two winners that year, the most in a single year since the prize's founding, due to the societal shutdown caused by the COVID-19 pandemic.

In 2023, Molesworth curated "Face to Face: Portraits of Artists by Tacita Dean, Brigitte Lacombe, and Catherine Opie" at the International Center of Photography, which focused on intimate portrait photography of various cultural figures by the three artists. Later that same year, a collection of her essays, Open Questions: Thirty Years of Writing about Art, curated from various exhibition catalogues and publications such as Artforum, was published by Phaidon Press.

== Other activities ==
Molesworth is the author of numerous catalogue essays and her writing has appeared in publications such as Artforum, Art Journal, Documents, and October. The recipient of the Bard Center for Curatorial Studies’s 2011 Audrey Irmas Award for Curatorial Excellence, she is currently at work on a book about "what art does."

Molesworth was a jury member for the College Art Association’s Distinguished Artist Award for Lifetime Achievement (2012), The New School’s Vera List Prize for Art and Politics (2014), the Prix Canson (2016), the Suzanne Deal Booth / FLAG Art Foundation Prize (2018), and the PinchukArtCentre’s Future Generation Art Prize (2018). In 2016, she was a member of the jury which selected Njideka Akunyili Crosby as recipient of the Prix Canson.

Molesworth was the commencement speaker for the UCLA School of the Arts and Architecture in June 2018. In 2022, she hosted the six-part podcast, Death of an Artist, about the death of Cuban-American artist Ana Mendieta, wife of Carl Andre; the series made several "best of 2022" lists, including those of The Economist and The Atlantic. She has since interviewed artists and thinkers for David Zwirner Gallery's "Dialogues" podcast. She also leads art conversations as the host of the gallery's video series "Program".

== Personal life ==
On August 13, 2006, Molesworth married art historian Susan Dackerman in Cambridge, Massachusetts.

== Selected exhibitions ==
- Kerry James Marshall: Mastry. 2016, Museum of Contemporary Art in Chicago; 2016–2017, Met Breuer; 2017, Museum of Contemporary Art Los Angeles.
- Leap Before You Look: Black Mountain College 1933–1957. 2015–2016, Institute of Contemporary Art, Boston; 2016, Hammer Museum. Curated by Helen Molesworth with Ruth Erickson. The Hammer Museum's presentation organized by Anne Ellegood with MacKenzie Stevens and January Parkos Arnall.
- MOCA: The Art of Our Time. 2015, Museum of Contemporary Art Los Angeles.
- Amy Sillman: One Lump or Two. 2013–2014, Institute of Contemporary Art, Boston.
- This Will Have Been: Art, Love & Politics in the 1980s. 2012, Museum of Contemporary Art, Chicago. Helen Molesworth guest curator.
- Catherine Opie: Empty and Full. 2011, Institute of Contemporary Art, Boston.
- Luc Tuymans. 2009, Wexner Center for the Arts; 2010, Dallas Museum of Art; 2010–2011, Museum of Contemporary Art in Chicago. Curated by Madeleine Grynsztejn and Helen Molesworth

== Selected publications ==
- Open Questions: Thirty Years of Writing about Art (Donna Wingate, editor.) London: Phaidon, 2023. ISBN 978-1-83866-605-7
- DEATH OF AN ARTIST. A podcast in conjunction with Pushkin Industries and Somethin' else and Sony evaluating the significance of women and non-white persons in modern art through the life and tragic death of artist Ana Mendieta.
- One Day at a Time: Manny Farber and Termite Art, Molesworth, Helen. Prestel, 2018. ISBN 978-3-7913-5766-9
- Duchamp—By Hand, Even, Molesworth, Helen. Wien Verlag für moderne Kunst, 2017. ISBN 978-3-903153-98-1
- Leap Before you Look : Black Mountain College, 1933–1957, Molesworth, Helen. Boston: Institute of Contemporary Art in association with Yale University Press, 2015. ISBN 978-0-300-21191-7
- Molesworth, Helen. "How to Install Art as a Feminist." Modern Women: Women Artists at The Museum of Modern Art. Ed. Connie Butler, Ed. Alexandra Schwartz. Published by The Museum of Modern Art, New York. 2014.
- Amy Sillman: One Lump or Two, Molesworth, Helen. New York: DelMonico Books Prestel, 2013.
- Louise Lawler, Molesworth, Helen. Cambridge, Massachusetts: MIT Press, 2013. ISBN 978-0-262-51835-2
- Klara Lidén Bodies of Society, Molesworth, Helen. New York: New Museum, 2012.
- This Will Have Been: Art, Love & Politics in the 1980s, Molesworth, Helen. Chicago: Museum of Contemporary Art Chicago; New Haven: Yale University Press, 2012.
- Catherine Opie: Empty and Full, Molesworth, Helen, ed. Stuttgart: Hatje Cantz, 2011.
- Dance/Draw: The Institute of Contemporary Art Boston, Molesworth, Helen. Ostfildern: Hatje Cantz, 2011.
- Luc Tuymans exh. cat. Palais des beaux-arts de Bruxelles, 18 février-8 mai 2011, Molesworth, Helen. Bruxelles: Ludion, DL 2011.
- Part Object Part Sculpture, Molesworth, Helen, ed., Penn State Press, 2005.
- Body Space, Molesworth, Helen. Baltimore Museum of Art, 2001.
- Work Ethic, Molesworth, Helen. Baltimore Museum of Art, 2003.
