= Ellipses =

Ellipses is the plural form of two different English words:

- Ellipse, a type of conic section in geometry
- Ellipsis, a three-dot punctuation mark (...)

Ellipses may also refer to:

- Ellipses, a French publication under the direction of Aymeric Chauprade

== See also ==
- Ellipse (disambiguation)
- Ellipsis (disambiguation)
