= Catherine Opie =

American fine-art photographer (born 1961)

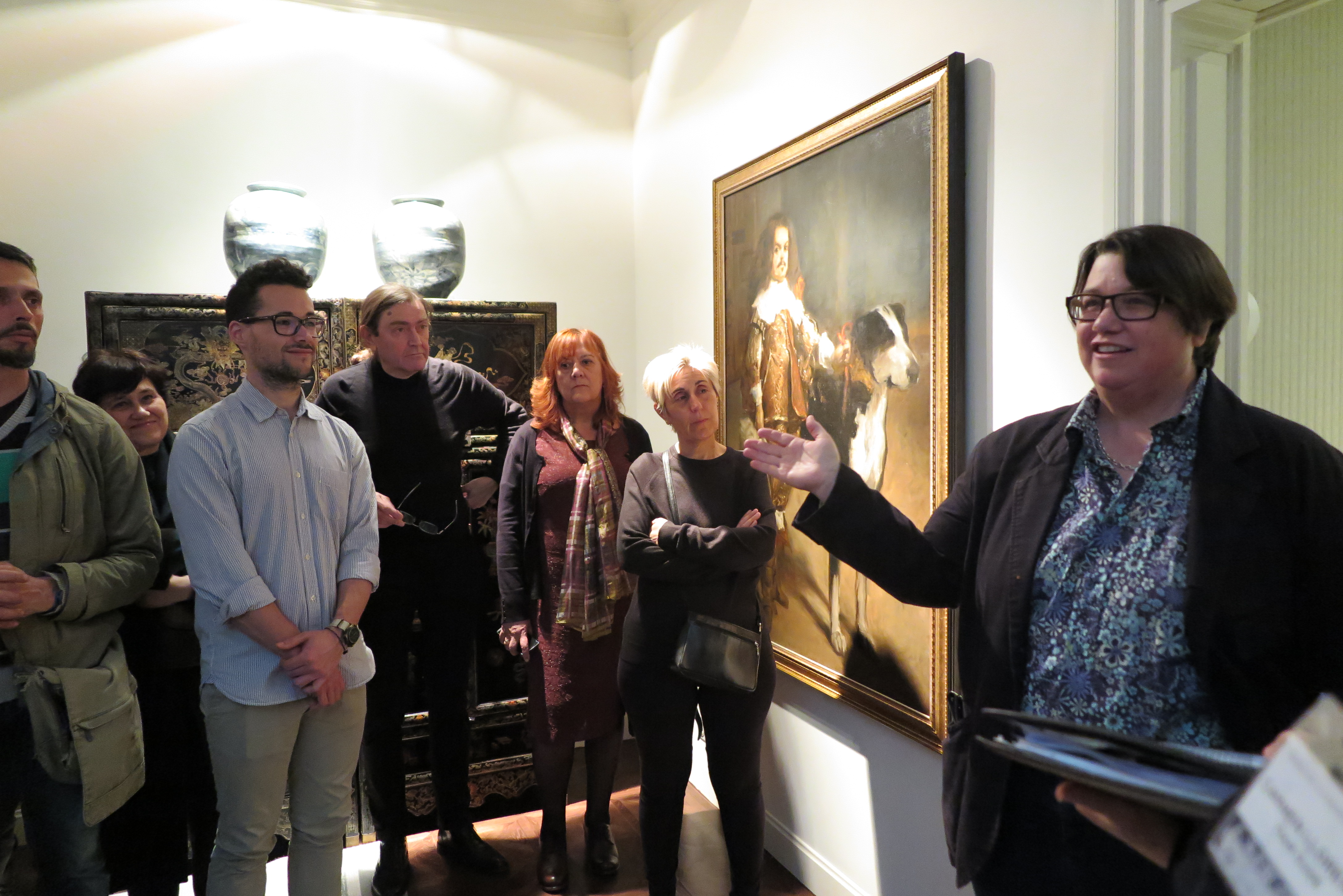
- Born: 1961 (age 64–65); Sandusky, Ohio, United States
- Education: San Francisco Art Institute (BFA); California Institute of the Arts (MFA)
- Known for: Portrait, landscape, and studio photography
- Notable work: Being and Having (1991); Portraits (1993—1997); Domestic (1999)
- Awards: United States Artists Fellowship (2006); Women's Caucus for Art Lifetime Achievement Award (2009); Guggenheim Fellowship (2019)

Catherine Sue Opie (born 1961) is an American fine-art photographer. Specializing in portrait, studio, and landscape photography, Opie creates pieces relating to sexual identity. She is known for her portraits exploring the Los Angeles leather dyke community.

Opie's work is held at the Museum of Modern Art and the Solomon R. Guggenheim Museum. She has won awards including the United States Artists Fellowship (2006) and the Women's Caucus for Art Lifetime Achievement Award (2009).

Opie is a professor emeritus at the University of California, Los Angeles (UCLA).

== Early life and education ==
Opie was born in Sandusky, Ohio in 1961. She spent her early childhood in Ohio.

On her 9th birthday, Opie received a Kodak Instamatic camera and began taking photographs of her family and community. One of her first photographs was a self-portrait of herself flexing. At age 14, she created her own darkroom. Her family moved from Ohio to California in 1975.

Opie earned a Bachelor of Fine Arts from the San Francisco Art Institute in 1985.

She later received a Master of Fine Arts degree from the California Institute of the Arts (CalArts) in 1988. Opie's thesis project, entitled Master Plan (1988), examined the way landscapes were being used in California which disturbed her. The project looked into construction sites, advertisement schemes, homeowner regulations, and the interior layout of homes within the community of Valencia, California.

== Career ==
=== Photography ===
In 1989, Opie moved to Los Angeles, California, and began working as an artist. She supported herself with a job as a laboratory technician at the University of California, Irvine. Opie and her then-partner, painter Julie Burleigh, constructed working studios in the backyard of their home in West Adams, Los Angeles.

As of 2026, Opie's studio is at The Brewery Art Colony.

=== Teaching ===
Opie's teaching career began in 2001 at the University of California, Los Angeles (UCLA). In 2019, UCLA announced Opie as the university’s inaugural endowed chair in the art department.

Opie taught photography workshops at Anderson Ranch Arts Center and Fine Arts Work Center.

=== Board member ===
At the Hammer Museum, Opie was on the first Artist Council (a series of sessions with curators and museum administrators) and served on the board of overseers.

Along with fellow artists John Baldessari, Barbara Kruger, and Edward Ruscha, Opie served as a member of the board for the Museum of Contemporary Art, Los Angeles. In 2012, they all resigned; however, they joined the museum's 14-member search committee for a new director after Jeffrey Deitch's resignation in 2013. Opie returned to the board in support of the museum's new director, Philippe Vergne, in 2014.

Opie was also on the board of the Andy Warhol Foundation for the Visual Arts.

Along with Richard Hawkins, Opie curated a selection of work by the late artist Tony Greene at the 2014 Whitney Biennial in New York City.

== Work ==
John and Scott (1993), from the Portraits series (1993-1997), at the Rubell Museum DC in 2022

Opie's work is characterized by formal rigor, technical expertise, art history references, and socio-political commentary. She mixes traditional photography with unconventional subjects. For example, she explores abstraction in the landscape through the placement of the horizon line in the Icehouses (2001) and Surfers (2003) series. She has printed photographs using Iris prints, instant film, and photogravure. Examples of art history references include the use of bright color backgrounds in portraits that reference the work of Hans Holbein the Younger and full-body frontal portraits that reference the work of August Sander. Opie also depicted herself with her son in the traditional pose of Madonna and Child in Self Portrait/Nursing (2004).

Opie's earlier work relies more heavily on documentary photography as opposed to allegory, yet in both she uses powerful and personal iconography. For instance, the portrait Self Portrait/Pervert (1994) uses blood on herself to confront ideas about normality. The symbolism used in this work is a recurring statement for Opie, also seen in another work entitled Self-portrait/Cutting (1993).

Opie first became known for her series with Being and Having (1991) and Portraits (1993–1997), which portray queer communities in Los Angeles and San Francisco. Being and Having includes 13 colour photographs of Opie's lesbian friends and looks at the performance of gender identity and masculinity, with visual references to 17th-century Old Master portraiture. In Portraits (1993–1997), Opie presents a variety of identities among the queer community, such as drag kings, cross-dressers, and trans men. The images reference Renaissance paintings of saints and characters. Also exploring ideas of the outward portrayal of identity, in Dyke (1993), Opie portrayed her friend Steakhouse, who has the word "dyke" tattooed on her neck. This photograph was also the first time Opie used a fabric background for her portraits, again alluding to Old Master paintings. She has said that she sees this photograph as existing within the history of painting, rather than photography. Opie has said that "Portraiture, for me, has always been about creating a visual representation of people who wouldn't otherwise be seen."

A common theme in her work is the concept of community. Opie has stated that "portraiture literally creates a history of one’s community." She has made portraits of groups including LGBT people, surfers, and high school football players. Her work is informed by her identity as an out lesbian. Her work also explores how the idea of family varies between straight and LGBTQ communities, with that LGBTQ people often basing their families on close friendships and community while straight people focus on their nuclear biological families. She is also interested in how identities are shaped by our surrounding architecture.

Her project American Cities (1997–2006) is a collection of panoramic black-and-white photographs of American cities. This series is similar to an earlier work of hers, Domestic (1995–1998), which documented her 2-month RV road trip, portraying lesbian families engaging in everyday household activities across the country.

Drawing inspiration from the transgressive photography of Robert Mapplethorpe, Nan Goldin, and feminist sex radicals, Opie has also explored controversial topics and imagery in her work. In her O folio—7 photogravures from 1999—Opie compiled extreme close-ups of sadomasochist pornographic images she had taken for On Our Backs.

In 2011, Opie photographed the home of Elizabeth Taylor in Bel Air, Los Angeles. Taylor died during the project and never met Opie. Opie took 3,000 images for the project; 129 comprised the completed study. The resultant images were published as 700 Nimes Road. Collector Daily noted the "relentless femininity of Taylor's taste" in the images contrasted with Opie's self-declared "identity as a butch woman" in Opie's foreword to 700 Nimes Road, and Opie's "status as an ordinary mortal" in comparison to Taylor's stardom.

Opie's first film, The Modernist (2017), is a tribute to French filmmaker Chris Marker's 1962 film La Jetée. Composed of 800 still images, the film features Pig Pen (aka Stosh Fila)—a genderqueer performance artist—as the protagonist. The Modernist has been described as an ode to Los Angeles that also questions the legacy of modernism in America. The twenty-two-minute film is about a performance artist who wants his own home and has fallen in love with the architecture of Los Angeles. Unable to purchase a place to live, the artist starts burning down the architecture of LA.

Opie is influenced heavily by photographer Lewis Hine.

== Personal life ==
Opie was previously in a relationship with painter Julie Burleigh. They lived together in West Adams, Los Angeles.

In 2001, Opie gave birth to a boy named Oliver through artificial insemination.

== Publications ==
=== Photobooks ===
- 700 Nimes Road. By Catherine Opie, with essays by Hilton Als, Ingrid Sischy, Prestel, Munich, 2015. ISBN 978-3791354255
- Catherine Opie: Keeping an Eye on the World. Buchhandlung Walter König, König, 2017.
- Catherine Opie, By Catherine Opie, with essays by Hilton Als, Douglas Fogle, Helen Molesworth, Elizabeth A.T. Smith, interview by Charlotte Cotton. Phaidon Press, New York, 2021. ISBN 978-1838662189

=== Exhibition catalogues ===
- Catherine Opie: In Between Here and There. Saint Louis, MO: Saint Louis Art Museum, 2000. (With an essay by Rochelle Steiner).
- Catherine Opie. The Photographers' Gallery, London, 2000.
- Catherine Opie: Skyways and Ice Houses. Walker Art Center 2002.
- 1999 / In and Around Home. The Aldrich Contemporary Museum of Art, Ridgefield, CT, and the Orange County Museum of Art, Newport Beach, CA, 2006.
- Chicago (American Cities). Museum of Contemporary Art, Chicago, 2006.
- Catherine Opie: An American Photographer. Guggenheim Museum, New York, NY, 2008. ISBN 978-0892073757
- Catherine Opie: Empty and Full. The Institute of Contemporary Art, Boston and Hatje Cantz, Stuttgart, 2011. ISBN 978-3775730150

=== Commentary ===
- Catherine Opie. Essays by Kate Bush, Joshua Decter & Russell Ferguson. The Photographers' Gallery, London, 2000.

== Selected museum works ==
- Master Plan (Floor Series) (1986-1988), Orange County Museum of Art, Costa Mesa, California
- Burnt House from Burlington and Ninth Street (1990), Museum of Contemporary Art San Diego
- Being and Having (1991), Museum of Modern Art, New York
- Angela Scheirl (1993), Museum of Fine Arts, Houston; and Museum of Modern Art, New York
- Dyke (1993), Museum of Modern Art, New York; Solomon R. Guggenheim Museum, New York; Tang Teaching Museum, Saratoga Springs, New York; and Whitney Museum, New York
- Jo (1993), Rubell Museum, Miami and Washington, D.C.; and Worcester Art Museum, Worcester, Massachusetts
- Mike and Sky (1993), Museum of Modern Art, New York; Rubell Museum, Miami and Washington, D.C.; and Whitney Museum, New York
- Pig Pen (1993), Crystal Bridges Museum of American Art, Bentonville, Arkansas; and Wadsworth Atheneum, Hartford, Connecticut
- Self Portrait/Cutting (1993), Los Angeles County Museum of Art; Museum of Contemporary Art, Los Angeles; Solomon R. Guggenheim Museum, New York; and Whitney Museum, New York
- Untitled #1, from the series Freeway (1993-1994), Tang Teaching Museum, Saratoga Springs, New York
- Untitled #5, from the series Freeway (1993-1994), J. Paul Getty Museum, Los Angeles; and Yale University Art Gallery, New Haven, Connecticut
- Untitled #16, from the series Freeway (1993-1994), Nevada Museum of Art, Reno, Nevada
- Untitled #20, from the series Freeway (1993-1994), Whitney Museum, New York
- Untitled #27, from the series Freeway (1993-1994), Museum of Contemporary Art, Los Angeles
- Crystal Mason (1994), Groninger Museum, Groningen, Netherlands; and Rubell Museum, Miami and Washington, D.C.
- Richard (1994), Montreal Museum of Fine Arts
- Ron Athey (1994), Museum of Fine Arts, Boston; and Whitney Museum, New York
- Self Portrait/Pervert (1994), Solomon R. Guggenheim Museum, New York
- Trash (1994), Mildred Lane Kemper Art Museum, St. Louis
- Vaginal Davis (1994), Museum of Fine Arts, Boston
- Flipper, Tanya, Chloe, & Harriet, San Francisco, California (1995), Museum of Fine Arts, Houston; Tate, London; and Whitney Museum, New York
- Dyke Deck (1996), Hood Museum of Art, Hanover, New Hampshire; Museum of Fine Arts, Boston; Rhode Island School of Design Museum, Providence, Rhode Island; and Yale University Art Gallery, New Haven, Connecticut
- Divinity Fudge (1997), Sheldon Museum of Art, Lincoln, Nebraska
- Untitled #1, from the series Mini-malls (1997-1998), Museum of Contemporary Art Chicago; and Museum of Contemporary Art, Los Angeles
- Melissa & Lake, Durham, North Carolina (1998), Solomon R. Guggenheim Museum, New York; and Tate, London
- Tammy Rae & Kaia, Durham, North Carolina (1998), Saint Louis Art Museum; and Walker Art Center, Minneapolis
- Freedom, Oklahoma (1999), Victoria and Albert Museum, London
- Untitled, Divinity (2000), Seattle Art Museum
- Untitled #1, from the series Wall Street (2000-2001), Museum of Contemporary Art Chicago
- Untitled #11, from the series Wall Street (2000-2001), Samuel P. Harn Museum of Art, Gainesville, Florida; and Tate, London
- Untitled #9, from the series Icehouses (2001), Los Angeles County Museum of Art; and Walker Art Center, Minneapolis
- Untitled #10, from the series Icehouses (2001), Museum of Contemporary Art, Los Angeles; and Walker Art Center, Minneapolis
- Self Portrait/Nursing (2004), Solomon R. Guggenheim Museum, New York
- Fall, Winter, Spring, Summer (Lake Michigan) (2004-2005), Museum of Contemporary Art Chicago
- Football Landscape #3 (Notre Dame vs. St. Thomas More, Lafayette, LA) (2007), Modern Art Museum of Fort Worth, Fort Worth, Texas
- Kate (Bike) (2007), San Francisco Museum of Modern Art
- Saint-Gilles-du-Gard (2007), Carnegie Museum of Art, Pittsburgh
- Football Landscape #13 (Twentynine Palms vs. Big Bear, Twentynine Palms, CA) (2008), Los Angeles County Museum of Art
- Inauguration portfolio (2009), Hirshhorn Museum and Sculpture Garden, Smithsonian Institution, Washington, D.C.; Los Angeles County Museum of Art; and Museum of Contemporary Art, Los Angeles
- Jewelry Boxes #6, from the portfolio 700 Nimes Road (2010-2011), Library of Congress, Washington, D.C.; and Louisiana Museum of Modern Art, Humlebæk, Denmark
- Elizabeth (2013), Institute of Contemporary Art, Boston
- Thelma and Duro (2017), National Portrait Gallery, London
- monument/monumental (2020), The Broad, Los Angeles

== Awards ==
- Los Angeles Museum of Contemporary Art/Citibank Private Bank Emerging Artist Award (1997)
- CalArts Alpert Award in the Arts (2003)
- The Aldrich Contemporary Art Museum Larry Aldrich Award (2004)
- United States Artists Fellowship (2006)
- Women's Caucus for Art Lifetime Achievement Award (2009)
- Archives of American Art Medal (2016)
- National Academy Museum Elected Academician (2016)
- Guggenheim Fellowship (2019)

== In popular culture ==
Her name appears in the lyrics of the Le Tigre song "Hot Topic".
