= Molly Gregory =

American artist (1914–2006)

- Born: 1914; Framingham, Massachusetts, U.S.
- Died: November 21, 2006 (aged 91–92); Hingham, Massachusetts, U.S.
- Education: Bennington College
- Occupations: Furniture maker and teacher
- Known for: Woodworking

Mary "Molly" Gregory (1914–2006) was an American furniture maker and teacher. She is known for teaching at Black Mountain College and for the furniture she created.

== Biography ==
Gregory was born in 1914 in Framingham, Massachusetts, where she grew up. She studied at Bennington College, graduating in 1936. She then taught at The Cambridge School of Weston for several years.

In 1941, Gregory relocated to North Carolina where she studied and taught at Black Mountain College (BMC) until 1947. While at BMC Gregory briefly ran the woodshop during World War II, when many men of teaching age were serving in the military. Molly also took over management of the farm during World War II, successfully producing a surplus of vegetables that she canned at Asheville Farm School for Black Mountain College's winter stores. Gregory also participated in the construction of the Studies Building and supervised the construction of furniture throughout the BMC campus.

Gregory left BMC to pursue her career as a furniture maker, returning to New England to create commissioned furniture in Vermont and Massachusetts. She taught woodworking at the Belmont Day School, Concord Academy, and Shady Hill School.

Gregory was a practicing Quaker. She died on November 21, 2006, in Hingham, Massachusetts.

Her work is included in the collections of the Asheville Art Museum and the Los Angeles County Museum of Art
