= Richard Hawkins (artist) =

American artist

Richard Hawkins (born 1961) is an American artist. Born in Mexia, Texas, he lives and works in Los Angeles. His works are held by museums including the Whitney Museum of American Art, the Museum of Modern Art, and the Art Institute of Chicago.

He received a Bachelor of Fine Arts from the University of Texas at Austin in 1984 and a Master of Fine Arts from the California Institute of the Arts (CalArts) in 1988. After graduating from CalArts, Hawkins worked for a time as a short story writer. Hawkins' art largely consists of sculpture and collage. His works combine "ubiquitous pop-culture images and objects with arcane references and quotes." He is gay, and his sexuality also informs his artwork. According to art historian Richard Meyer, Hawkins' "mash-up [of] avant-garde, kitsch and kink [...] challenge[s] us to rethink our hierarchies of value and visual pleasure."

Hawkins was instrumental in reviving the work of artist Tony Greene, including co-curating (with Catherine Opie) an exhibition of Greene's work that was included in the 2014 Whitney Biennial exhibition in New York.

== Exhibitions ==
- Third Mind, Art Institute of Chicago (2010)
- Third Mind, Hammer Museum (2011)
- Hijikata Twist, Tate Liverpool (2014)
- Potentialities, Kunsthalle Wien (2025)
