= Camp Rockmont for Boys =

Historic district in North Carolina, United States

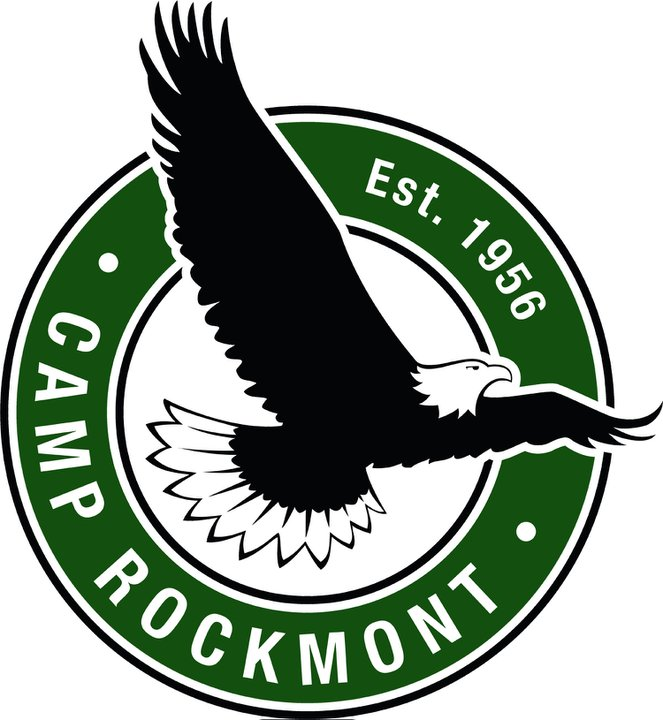
- Strength and Gentleness, Force and Refinement, Mastery of Body, Servitude to God
- Location: Black Mountain, NC
- Established: 1956
- Coordinating Director: Austin Ashcraft
- Associate Director: Daniel Weatherby
- Program Director: Justin Bennett
- Assistant Director: Elias Longenecker
- Website: www.rockmont.com

Camp Rockmont for Boys is an American Camp Association accredited Christian residential boys' summer camp in Black Mountain, North Carolina. Rockmont was founded in 1956 on the former campus of Black Mountain College. There are four "classic" sessions held each summer (13 days), as well as a one week starter session. Within the classic sessions are a three and four week option for more experienced campers. Capacity for each session is about 400 boys, with each session varying slightly depending on enrollment.

== History ==
Rockmont was founded in 1956 by George Pickering on the campus of Black Mountain College, which had recently closed. He remained owner of the camp until he was convicted of molesting children that were enrolled there. It was founded as a boys-only Christian camp, and carried an American Indian theme. This Native American theme continued until 2000, at which time the theme was dropped, but still holds roots to it through the ceremonial "council".

== Structure ==
=== Age Division ===
Rockmont is rather large for a summer camp, with around 400 boys per session ranging from ages 6 to 16. The camp is divided up into different groups based on age and each boy is placed in a cabin with 7 to 14 boys his age and 1 or 2 counselors. Campers spend a large amount of time with their cabin, including sleeping in the same cabin and eating with their counselors in the dining hall. The cabins are numbered from youngest to oldest: 1 through 40, 6.5 (65), 18.5 (185), 42, 43 and 44. (41 is skipped numerically in honor of old camp lore.)

Each cabin is part of a larger "tribe", which generally include 6 to 8 cabins. The 6 tribes, from youngest to oldest, are Buckeye, Birch, Hickory, Hemlock, Poplar, and Sycamore. Tribes often do activities together, and sometimes compete against or with other tribes in games. Each tribe has a Tribal Director (TD) assigned to it, whose purpose is to plan, run, and manage activities, as well as to support the cabin staff within their tribe.

Each tribe is also part of another larger camp. The camp is divided into junior camp, better known as Bear Camp (Camp for younger children), intermediate camp (Deer Camp), and senior camp (Mountain Camp). The Buckeye and Birch tribes make up Bear Camp, the Hickory and Hemlock tribes form Deer Camp, and the Poplar and Sycamore tribes form Mountain Camp.

=== Sessions ===
Rockmont is open for 5 sessions each summer, for a total of 9 weeks. The shortest stay (6 days) is Starter camp, usually attended by first time, younger campers. The 4 "classic camp" sessions are Classic 1 through 4. Base camp is the three week option, and Summit camp is the longest stay at four weeks.

== Experience ==
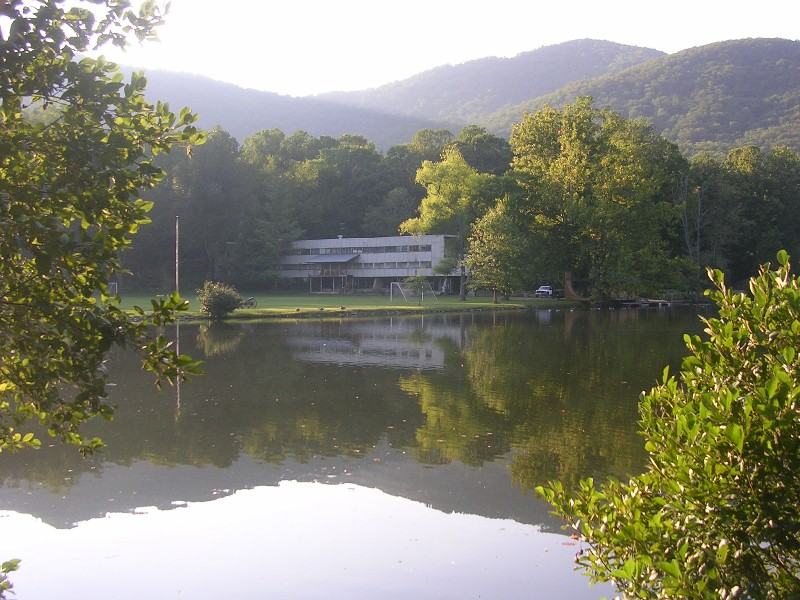
The main offices for Camp Rockmont, known as the Ship

Rockmont offers a range of different activities for campers to take part in, from traditional sports such as Soccer and Basketball, to shooting skills such as Archery and Riflery, as well as creative activities like Ceramics and Rocketry. Campers sign up for 6 of these activities before they attend in the summer, and each day visit 2 of their 4 "skills". Beyond that, each day also includes 1 to 2 "tribal activities", which are usually large group games such as Gladiator (Capture the Flag), Behind Enemy Lines, Invasion or Battleball (Dodgeball). Campers also get a free period every day, called Free Swim, and a Rest Period following Lunch.

Rockmont also puts a focus on Christian ideals. Counselors give devotions to their cabins every night, usually talking about a bible verse or telling a personal story relating to it. As well, every morning each tribe participates in a "Morning Watch", in which the tribe sings camp songs, and the Tribal Director gives a devotion to the tribe. Also important to the Christian ideal of the camp is the council system.

=== Council ===
Every Sunday, each camp gathers at their "council ring" and recognizes campers for ways throughout the week that they grew and became closer to God. Every Council has a traditional rule of silence and usually must hold that silence until back to their cabin. Council is made up of Tribal Directors, Camp Directors, and Paladins, all hold "council names". The Paladins, is a group of campers (within Mountain Camp) that can be chosen and receive a ring as well as serve in council. Paladins are known to serve for life, as Paladins who return as councilors still hold the name and ring. Much of the Paladin initiation and selection is shrouded in mystery as the men who do serve are sworn to secrecy. The only publicly known challenge of becoming a Paladin is 24 hour silence, where the pledge can not speak or make (purposeful) grunts, hums, etc.

== Registration ==
Camper registration costs about $1700 per week, though this amount varies with the session chosen. Campers never need to pay any money at camp, though they are allowed to use money from an account set up by the parents to purchase items at the camp store.

== Related organizations ==
=== Rockmont Alumni Association ===
The Rockmont Alumni Association (RAA) is an organization founded by former Camp Rockmont Director and current CEO, R. David Bruce. In 2006, the RAA hosted a reunion to celebrate the Camp's 50th summer of operation. The event's success prompted the RAA to begin hosting similar events every 5 years starting in August, 2010.

=== Camp Diversity Foundation ===
The Camp Diversity Foundation (CDF) is a non-profit organization based in Black Mountain, North Carolina which aims to provide a Christian summer camp experience to financially disadvantaged children. The CDF uses Camp Rockmont's facilities to host its one-week "Adventure Camp" at the end of Camp Rockmont's regular camp season.

The Camp Diversity Foundation is promoted by the Rockmont Alumni Association, and receives financial support from its members.
