= Douglas Fogle =

American art curator (born 1964)

Douglas Fogle (born 1964 or 1965) is an American art curator.

He has been a curator at Anderson Ranch Arts Center in Aspen, Colorado, Carnegie Museum of Art in Pittsburgh, Pennsylvania, and Walker Art Center in Minneapolis. He was the curator of the Hammer Museum in Los Angeles, California from 2009 to 2012..

== Hammer Museum ==
While Fogle was the chief curator at the Hammer museum, he added to the Hammer Contemporary Collection, including videos by Doug Aitken and Barbara Kruger, paintings by Lari Pittman and Ed Ruscha, and a large cut-paper silhouette work by Kara Walker, as well as a multimedia installation by Charles Gaines.

== Later work ==
In 2025, he was the curator of Marlene Dumas: Cycladic Blues at the Museum of Cycladic Art, Athens, Greece and Friends in a Field: Conversations with Raoul De Keyser at Mu.ZEE, Ostend, Belgium. In 2022 to 2025, he curated Thomas Demand: The Stutter of History at UCCA Edge, Shanghai, which also showed at Jeu de Paume, Paris in 2023, Israel Museum, Jerusalem in 2023, Museum of Fine Arts Houston in 2024, and Taipei Museum of Fine Arts in 2025. In 2026, he curated an exhibit of the films of Bruce Conner at the Marciano Art Foundation.
