= Frank Weise =

American architect and urban activist

- Born: Frank Weiss; August 10, 1918; Brooklyn, New York, U.S.
- Died: January 31, 2003 (aged 84); Philadelphia, Pennsylvania, U.S.
- Education: University of Pennsylvania (B.Arch.); Harvard University (M.Arch.)
- Occupation: Architect
- Practice: Private practice, Philadelphia
- Projects: Washington Mews; Camac Village; Head House Square restoration

Frank Weise (born Frank Weiss; August 10, 1918 – January 31, 2003) was an American architect based in Philadelphia, Pennsylvania. He was known for his modernist and later postmodern-influenced designs, as well as for his civic activism in urban planning. Weise designed dozens of mid-century modern homes in the Philadelphia region and led a successful campaign in the 1960s to alter the route of Interstate 95, preserving access between the city’s historic neighborhoods and the Delaware River waterfront. He was also a founding figure of two Philadelphia cultural institutions, the Wilma Theater and the Theater of the Living Arts.

== Early life and education ==
Weise was born in Brooklyn, New York, as Frank Weiss, and moved with his family to Philadelphia at a young age. He attended Simon Gratz High School. He studied architecture at the University of Pennsylvania, earning a Bachelor of Architecture degree in 1942, graduating with honors and receiving awards in freehand drawing and a first medal from the Beaux-Arts Institute of Design.

After completing his undergraduate studies, Weise pursued graduate education at Harvard University, receiving a Master of Architecture degree in 1945. While at Harvard, he studied under modernist architects Walter Gropius and Marcel Breuer. In the same year, he also attended Black Mountain College in North Carolina, where he studied design at the experimental art and design school.

== Career ==
After completing his studies, Weise briefly worked in the Philadelphia office of architects George Howe and Louis I. Kahn, contributing to wartime housing projects during World War II. Following the war, he relocated to Chicago, where he worked under planner Reginald Isaacs on the master plan for Michael Reese Hospital. He later joined the firms Skidmore, Owings & Merrill and Loebl, Schlossman & Bennett. In 1949, while at Loebl, Schlossman & Bennett, Weise was part of the design team for Park Forest, Illinois, an early planned suburban community for returning veterans.

Weise returned to Philadelphia in 1949 and established his own architectural practice. Between 1949 and 1962, he completed approximately thirty custom residences in the Philadelphia region, including modern rowhouses in Center City neighborhoods such as Washington Square West and single-family homes in Roxborough, Wynnefield, and the Main Line suburbs.

In the mid-1960s, Weise designed two urban infill townhouse developments: Washington Mews (near 11th and Lombard Streets) and Camac Village (along the 1200 blocks of Lombard and Pine Streets and the 400 block of South Camac Street). One of his few institutional commissions was District Health Center No. 6, a public health clinic at Girard Avenue and North 4th Street in Philadelphia.

=== Urban planning advocacy ===
In the 1960s, Weise became a prominent advocate for urban planning reform in Philadelphia. After reviewing a scale model of the proposed elevated Interstate 95 along the Delaware River, he organized a committee of architects to challenge the design. Their advocacy contributed to the decision to construct portions of the highway as a depressed roadway rather than a viaduct, preserving pedestrian access and sightlines between historic neighborhoods and the waterfront, including the area around Penn's Landing.

=== Preservation and cultural work ===
During the 1970s, Weise played a major role in the restoration and adaptive reuse of Head House Square in Society Hill, revitalizing one of Philadelphia’s oldest market complexes. In the 1980s, he contributed to early planning studies for the preservation and adaptive reuse of Eastern State Penitentiary.

Weise was also active in Philadelphia’s cultural life. He was a founding member of the Wilma Theater and the Theater of the Living Arts (TLA). In 1965, he served as architect for renovations to the TLA’s historic building on South Street, converting it into a modern performance venue.

=== Teaching ===
Weise held teaching appointments at several institutions, including serving as a visiting professor at the University of Michigan. He also taught at Moore College of Art and the Philadelphia Museum College of Art.

== Death ==
Weise died on January 31, 2003, at the age of 84. News reports cited the cause of death as a cerebral hemorrhage.

== Architectural style ==
Weise’s work evolved from early mid-century modernism toward a contextual, historically referential approach. Influenced by mentors such as Kahn and Gropius, his early residential designs emphasized functional layouts, clean lines, and modern materials. Later projects incorporated arches, curved surfaces, and historic forms, anticipating postmodern architectural trends while remaining sensitive to urban context and scale.

== Notable works ==
- 307 South Chadwick Street (Philadelphia) – Weise’s home and studio, extensively redesigned between 1966 and 2003; listed on the Philadelphia Register of Historic Places in 2023.
- Washington Mews – mid-1960s townhouse development, Philadelphia.
- Camac Village – 1960s urban townhouse development, Philadelphia.
- District Health Center No. 6 – public health clinic, Philadelphia.
- Theater of the Living Arts Renovation (1965) – South Street, Philadelphia.
- Head House Square Restoration – Society Hill, Philadelphia.

== Legacy ==
Weise’s legacy is closely tied to Philadelphia’s architectural and urban development. His advocacy against elevated highway construction influenced the design of I-95 and anticipated later waterfront reconnection efforts. His preservation work at Head House Square and Eastern State Penitentiary helped shape Philadelphia’s modern preservation movement. In 2013, the University of Pennsylvania Architectural Archives acquired his professional records, preserving his drawings and papers for research. In 2023, his Chadwick Street residence was designated a historic place, recognizing it as his most significant work.
