= Elysian Fields =

The Elysian Fields, also called Elysium, are the final resting place of the souls of the heroic and the virtuous in Greek mythology and religion.

Elysian Fields may also refer to:

== Places ==
- Elysian Fields, Hoboken, New Jersey, site of the first organized baseball game
- Elysian Fields, Mississippi
- Elysian Fields, Texas
- Avenue of the Elysian Fields, Champs-Élysées, major thoroughfare in Paris
- Elysian Fields Avenue, New Orleans, a setting and a symbolic element in A Streetcar Named Desire

== Art, fiction, and media ==
=== Music ===
- Elysian Fields, an American art rock band
- Beyond Elysian Fields, a 2004 album by Hugh Cornwell (formerly the Stranglers)
- "Elysian Fields", a song from the 1994 Megadeth album Youthanasia
- "Elysian Fields", a song from the 2006 God Is An Astronaut EP A Moment of Stillness
- "The Garden of Elysian", a song from the 2019 Local Natives album Violet Street
- "Elysian Fields", a song by Andy Moor and Carrie Skipper
- "Elysian Fields", a song by Suicideboys
- Elysian Fields, a music festival held the first weekend of August in Boyce, Virginia

=== Other media ===
- Elysian Fields Quarterly, a literary baseball journal
- The Man from Elysian Fields, a 2001 movie starring Andy Garcia
- Elysium (film), a 2013 movie starring Matt Damon
- Elysian Fields, destination of Blanche Dubois in the 1947 play A Streetcar Named Desire by Tennessee Williams
- Elysian Fields, secret society in the television series House of Cards
- Elysian Fields, development company in the 2011 video game L.A. Noire
- Elysian Fields, floating nightclub in the 2012 film Beasts of the Southern Wild
- Elysian Fields, highway in the 2013 game Grand Theft Auto V
- Elysian Fields appear in the 2018 film The House That Jack Built
- Disco Elysium, a 2019 detective role-playing game
- Elysian Fields, an idyllic place in the 1960 novel The Moviegoer by Walker Percy

== See also ==
- Elysian (disambiguation)
