= Black Mountain College =

Former liberal arts college in North Carolina

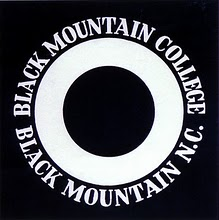
- Type: Private liberal arts college
- Active: 1933–1957
- Director: John Andrew Rice (until 1940)
- Administrative staff: about 30
- Students: about 1,200 total
- Location: Black Mountain, North Carolina, United States
- Website: blackmountaincollege.org
- Black Mountain College Historic District
- U.S. National Register of Historic Places
- U.S. Historic district
- Location within North Carolina Location within the United States
- Nearest city: Black Mountain, North Carolina
- Area: 586.9 acres (237.5 ha)
- Built: 1923
- Architectural style: Bungalow, craftsman, International Style
- NRHP reference No.: 82001281
- Added to NRHP: October 5, 1982

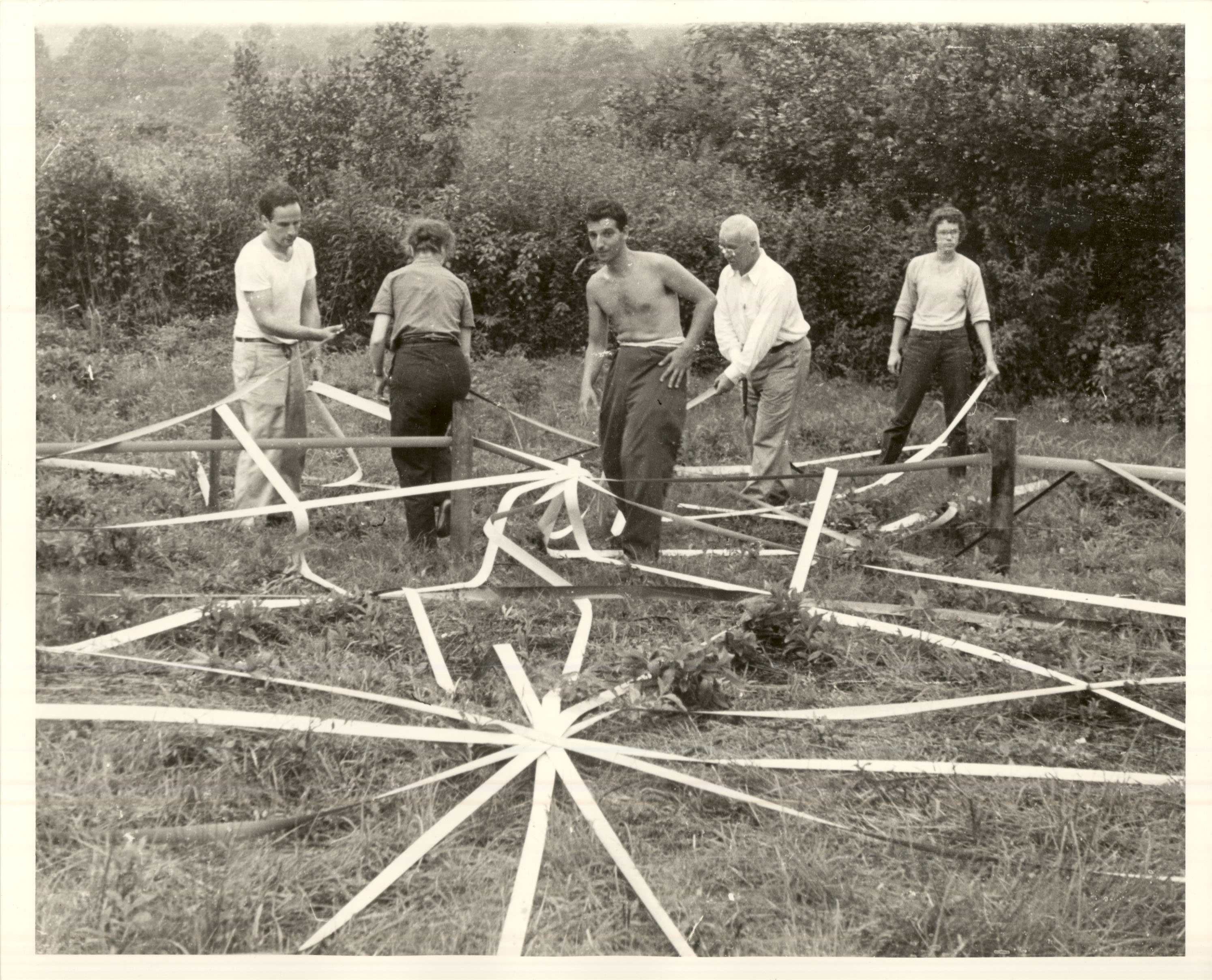
Buckminster Fuller and students assemble a geodesic dome, 1948

Black Mountain College (BMC) was a private liberal arts college in Black Mountain, North Carolina, United States. It was founded in 1933 by John Andrew Rice, Theodore Dreier, and several others. The college was ideologically organized around John Dewey's educational philosophy, which emphasized holistic learning and the study of art as central to a liberal arts education.

Many of the college's faculty and students were or would go on to become highly influential in the arts, including Josef and Anni Albers, Ruth Asawa, John Cage, Robert Creeley, Merce Cunningham, Max Dehn, Elaine de Kooning, Willem de Kooning, Buckminster Fuller, Walter Gropius, Ray Johnson, Franz Kline, Robert Motherwell, Charles Olson, Robert Rauschenberg, M. C. Richards, Dorothea Rockburne, Michael Rumaker, Ben Shahn, Aaron Siskind, Cy Twombly, Knute Stiles, Frank Weise, Benjamin Forrest Williams, and Stefan Wolpe.

The school closed in 1957 due to funding issues; Camp Rockmont for Boys now sits on the campus' site. The history and legacy of Black Mountain College are preserved and extended by the Black Mountain College Museum + Arts Center in nearby Asheville, North Carolina.

== History ==
Black Mountain College was founded in 1933 by John Andrew Rice, Theodore Dreier, Frederick Georgia, and Ralph Lounsbury, who were dismissed as faculty from Rollins College in a seminal academic freedom incident, specifically for refusing to sign a loyalty pledge, for which Rollins was formally censured by the American Association of University Professors. The institution was established to "avoid the pitfalls of autocratic chancellors and trustees and allow for a more flexible curriculum," and "with the holistic aim 'to educate a student as a person and a citizen," according to historian Eva Díaz. The school was originally funded through a $10,000 gift from "Mac" Forbes, a former Rollins College faculty member, after the founders were unable to raise funds from traditional sources.^{:7}

Black Mountain was experimental in nature and committed to an interdisciplinary approach, prioritizing art-making as a necessary component of education and attracting a faculty and lecturers that included many of America's leading visual artists, composers, poets, and designers. During the 1930s and 1940s the school flourished, becoming well known as an incubator for artistic talent. Notable events at the school were common; it was here that the first large-scale geodesic dome was made by faculty member Buckminster Fuller and students, where Merce Cunningham formed his dance company, and where John Cage staged his first musical happening. In the 1950s, the focus of the school shifted to the literary arts under the rectorship of Charles Olson. Olson founded The Black Mountain Review in 1954 and, together with his colleague and student Robert Creeley, developed the poetic school of Black Mountain poets.

In 1952, a seminal pottery workshop took place that commingled Eastern and Western traditions and sensibilities, influencing many mid-20th century studio potters.

The College was an important incubator for the American avant-garde. It proved to be an important precursor to and prototype for many subsequent alternative colleges in the United States, including College of the Atlantic, Naropa University, the University of California, Santa Cruz, Marlboro College, Evergreen State College, Hampshire College, Shimer College, Prescott College, Goddard College, World College West (1973–1992), the New College of Florida, and Warren Wilson College. Bennington College in Bennington, Vermont, based on the same philosophy, was founded one year before Black Mountain College.

== Structure ==
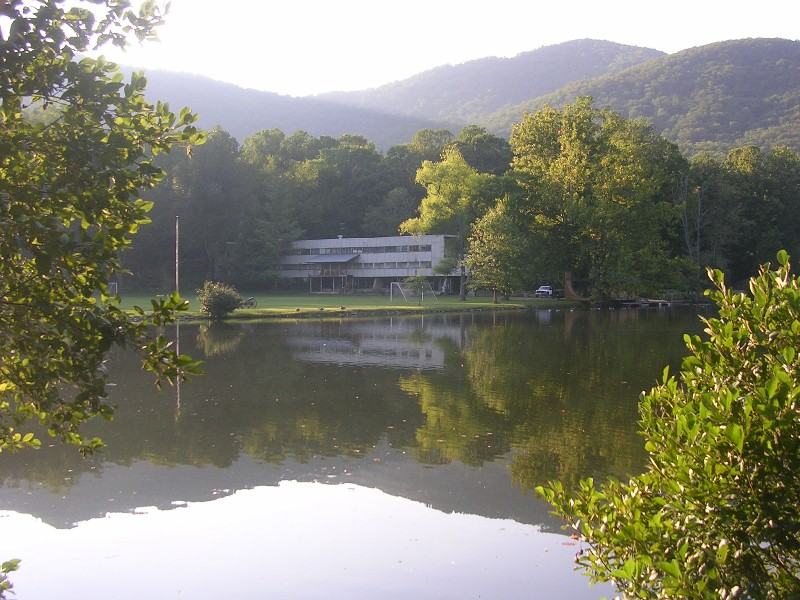
Main Building of the former Black Mountain College, on the current grounds of Camp Rockmont

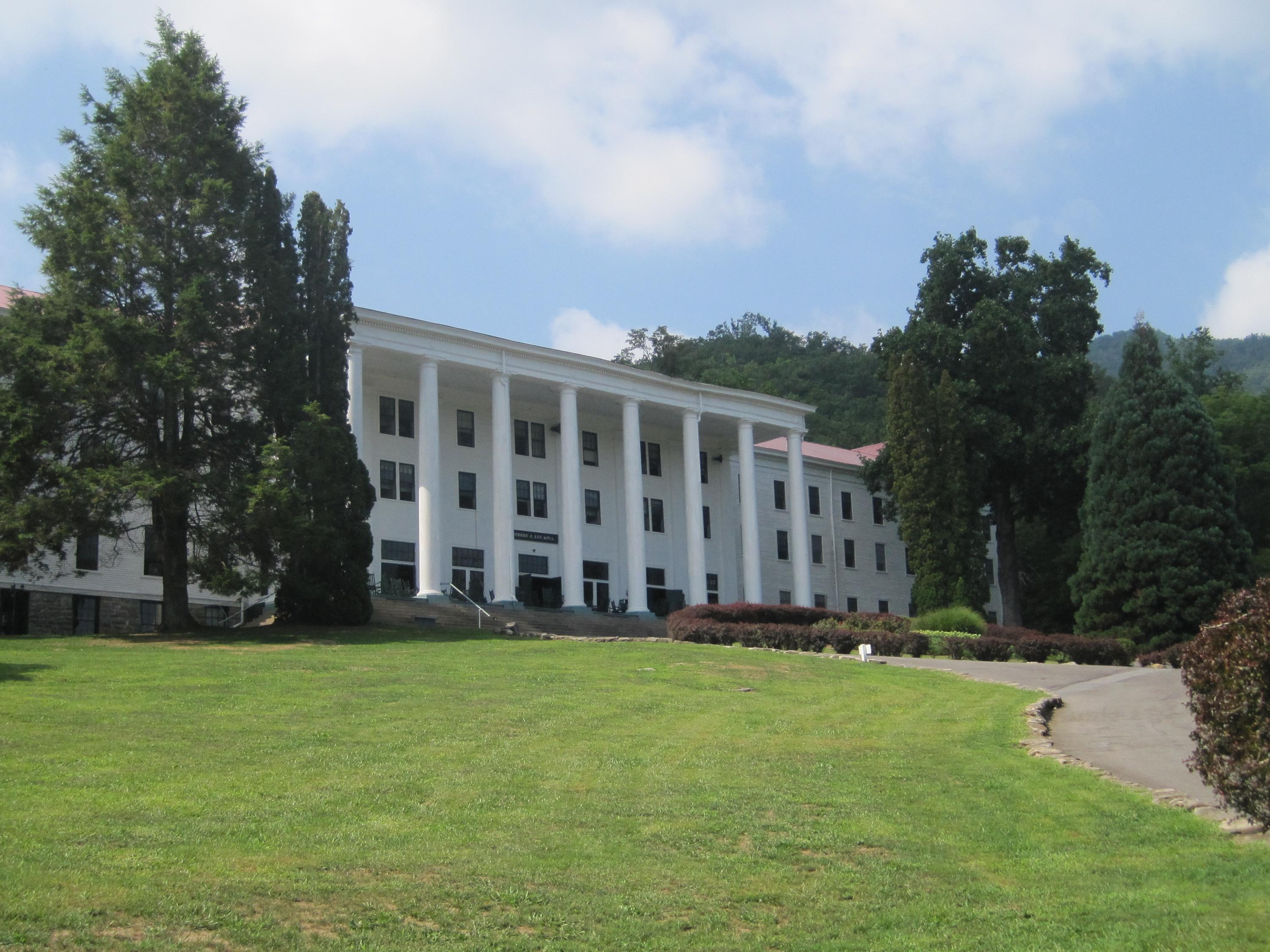
From 1933 to 1941, Black Mountain College was located at the YMCA Blue Ridge Assembly.

The school operated using non-hierarchical methodologies that placed students and educators on the same plane. Revolving around 20th-century ideals about the value and importance of balancing education, art, and cooperative labor, students were required to participate in farm work, construction projects, and kitchen duty as part of their holistic education.

The students were involved at all levels of institutional decision-making. They were also left in charge of deciding when they were ready to graduate, which notoriously few ever did. There were no course requirements, official grades (except for transfer purposes), or accredited degrees. Graduates were presented with handcrafted diplomas as purely ceremonial symbols of their achievement.

The liberal arts program offered at Black Mountain was broad, and supplemented by art making as a means of cultivating creative thinking within all fields. While Josef Albers led the school, the only two requirements were a course on materials and form taught by Albers and a course on Plato.

== Sociopolitical context ==
In 1933, the Nazi Party shut down the Bauhaus in Germany, a similarly progressive arts-based educational institution. Many of the school's faculty left Europe for the US, and a number of them settled at Black Mountain, most notably Josef Albers, who was selected to run the art program, and his wife Anni Albers, who taught weaving and textile design.

Adolf Hitler's rise to power and the subsequent persecution taking place in Europe led many artists and intellectuals to flee and resettle in the US, populating Black Mountain College with an influx of both students and faculty.

In addition, the college was operating in the South during the period of legal racial segregation at other colleges and universities in the region. While not immune from racial tensions, the student Alma Stone Williams, an African-American woman who enrolled at Black Mountain College in 1944, is considered by some to be the first black student to enroll in an all-white institution of higher education in the South during the Jim Crow era. Notable African-American instructors included Carol Brice and Roland Hayes during the 1945 Summer Music Institute; Percy H. Baker, hired on full-time in 1945; Jacob Lawrence and Gwendolyn Knight during the 1946 Summer Art Institute; and Mark Oakland Fax for the Spring 1946 quarter. The Julius Rosenwald Fund provided African-American teachers' salaries as well as student scholarships.

== Locations ==
The college originally rented the YMCA Blue Ridge Assembly buildings south of Black Mountain, North Carolina, founded and owned by another progressive educator, Willis D. Weatherford.

In 1937, it purchased a 667-acre (270 ha) property across the valley at Lake Eden.^{:8} This property, developed by E.W. Grove (of the Grove Park Inn and Grove Arcade in Asheville) as a summer resort for residents of his nearby Grovemont neighborhood, included a gate house, dining hall, sleeping lodges, several cottages and other structures.

In May 1941, following the end of their lease at Blue Ridge Assembly, the College moved its operations to Lake Eden, where it remained until its closing in 1957.^{:8} Over these 16 years, College faculty, staff, and students established a working farm and constructed new buildings, including the iconic Studies Building designed by architect A. Lawrence Kocher, music rehearsal cubicles (Paul Beidler), the Service Building (Lawrence Kocher), the Science Building (Paul Williams, Dan Rice, and Stan Vanderbeek), the Minimum House (designed by students), the Jalowetz House (Lawrence Kocher), and the Quiet House (a memorial to Mark Dreier designed by Alex "Bill" Reed).

The property was later purchased and converted to an ecumenical Christian boys' residential summer camp (Camp Rockmont). This has been used for years as the site of the Black Mountain Festival, the Lake Eden Arts Festival (LEAF), and Black Mountain College Museum + Arts Center's {Re}HAPPENING. A number of the original structures are still in use as lodgings or administrative facilities, and two frescoes painted by Jean Charlot remain intact on the site.

== Closing ==
Black Mountain College closed in 1957, eight years after Albers left to direct the first design department at Yale University. The college suspended classes by court order due to debts; the school was unable to sustain itself financially given the greatly decreased number of students. In 1962, the school's books were finally closed, with all debts covered.

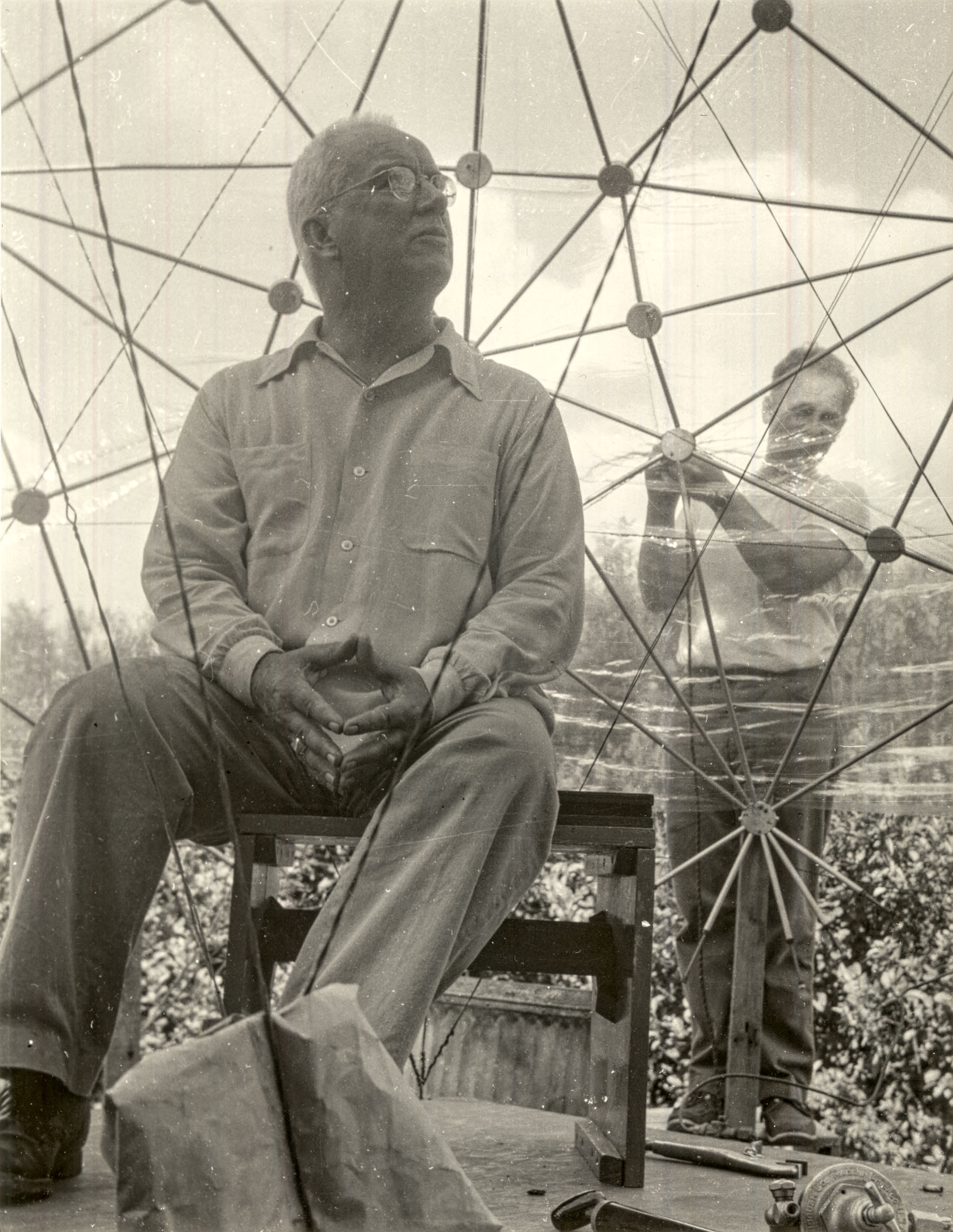
Buckminster Fuller at Black Mountain College in 1949

== Legacy ==
The Black Mountain College Museum + Arts Center, founded in 1993 in Asheville, continues the legacy of Black Mountain College through talks, exhibitions, performances, collection and preservation, and an annual fall conference that examines the college's history and impact.

The Journal of Black Mountain College Studies is a multidisciplinary open-access digital publication that publishes articles, essays, and creative work related to the school and the individuals associated with it.

Black Mountain College was the subject of the museum exhibition Leap Before You Look: Black Mountain College 1933–1957, which opened at the Institute of Contemporary Art, Boston on October 10, 2015. The show was curated by Helen Molesworth with Ruth Erickson. The show later exhibited at the Hammer Museum from February 21 to May 15, 2016. The accompanying catalog included contributions from curators and scholars such as Brenda Danilowitz, Eva Díaz, Nancy Perloff, Alice Sebrell, Jenni Sorkin, and Gloria Sutton, among others.

Black Mountain College was featured in Nicholas Sparks' novel, The Longest Ride (2013) and the 2015 movie adaptation of the same name.

== Notable people ==
=== Alumni ===
- Hazel Larsen Archer
- Ruth Asawa
- Jane Mayhall
- John Wieners
- Jonathan Williams

=== Faculty ===
- Anni Albers
- Josef Albers
- Max Dehn
- Molly Gregory

== See also ==
- California Academy of Studio Arts
- Cornish College of the Arts

== General and cited references ==
- Bennis, Warren & Biederman, Patricia Ward (1997). "Experiment at Black Mountain". Organizing Genius: The Secrets of Creative Collaboration. Addison Wesley. pp. 142–170. ISBN 0-201-57051-3.
- Shape of Imagination: Women of Black Mountain College. Asheville, NC: Black Mountain College Museum + Arts Center. 2008. ISBN 978-0977413812.
- Bloch, Mark. (January 2012). "Black Mountain College and Its Legacy @ Loretta Howard Gallery". White Hot Magazine.
- Collier, Caroline, ed. (2005). Starting at Zero: Black Mountain College, 1933–1957. Arnolfini Gallery and Cambridge University. ISBN 978-0-907738-78-7.
- Díaz, Eva (2015). The Experimenters: Chance and Design at Black Mountain College. The University of Chicago Press. ISBN 978-0-226-06798-8.
- Fortini, Amanda (July 7, 2022). "Why Are We Still Talking About Black Mountain College?". The New York Times.
- Duberman, Martin (December 17, 1971). Black Mountain An Exploration in Community. W.W. Norton. ISBN 0393309533.
- Harris, Mary Emma (2002). The Arts at Black Mountain College. The MIT Press. ISBN 978-0-262-58212-4.
- Katz, Vincent, ed. (2003). Black Mountain College: Experiment in Art. Cambridge, Massachusetts: The MIT Press. ISBN 9780262112796. OCLC 50518822.
- Lane, Marvin, ed. (c. 1990). Black Mountain College: Sprouted Seeds: An Anthology of Personal Accounts. University of Tennessee Press. ISBN 978-0-87049-663-9.
- Molesworth, Helen, ed. (2016). Leap Before You Look: Black Mountain College 1933–1957. Institute of Contemporary Art in Association with the Yale University Press. ISBN 978-0-300-21191-7.
- Rumaker, Michael (2003). Black Mountain Days. Black Mountain Press. ISBN 0-9649020-8-7.
- Schwabsky, Barry (March 14, 2016). "The Weirdness and Joy of Black Mountain College". The Nation: 27–30. Archived from the original on August 18, 2016. (exhibit review)
