= Roy Dowell =

California contemporary visual artist

Roy Dowell (b. 1951) is an American contemporary visual artist, based in California.

== About ==
He was born in 1951 in New York City and his work combines collage and painted elements, and elements of mass media to create abstract compositions.

Dowell has had a solo installation at the Los Angeles County Museum of Art. His work is in the collections of that museum, and of the Los Angeles Museum of Contemporary Art, the Hammer Museum of UCLA, Berkeley Museum of Art and the Oakland Museum.

In 1990, Dowell established a graduate fine arts department at Otis College of Art and Design in Westchester. In 2010, the Ben Maltz Gallery of the school showed "The Story of O", with work by twenty graduates of the department. He was a "critic's pick" in the May 2010 issue of ARTnews.

He has been awarded a J. Paul Getty Fellowship in the Visual Arts, and has served as artist in residence at the Anderson Ranch Arts Center, Snowmass, Colorado.

He is partnered to artist Lari Pittman.
