= Ellipsis (disambiguation) =

An ellipsis is a punctuation mark comprised a series of dots: ...

"Ellipsis" may also refer to:

== Arts and media ==
- Ellipsis (narrative device), a literary plot technique whereby events are omitted
- Ellipsis (Scorn album), a 1995 electronica remix
- The..., a 2010 release by South Korean boyband JYJ
- "...", a song from the 2012 Flobots album The Circle in the Square
- Ellipsis (Biffy Clyro album), a 2016 alt-rock release
- Ellipsis (film), a 2024 Spanish mystery thriller
- ..., a deluxe expanded edition of the 2025 Kesha album Period
- ... (poetry collection), a poetry collection by Fady Joudah

== Computing ==
- Ellipsis (computer programming), a computer language token usually indicating a range of values
- Ellipsis button, a graphical user interface component

== Grammar ==
- Ellipsis (linguistics), the omission from a clause of words otherwise syntactically required by remaining elements
- Verb phrase ellipsis, an elliptical construction in which a verb phrase has been left out (elided)

== See also ==
- Elision (disambiguation)
- Ellipse (disambiguation)
- Ellipses (disambiguation)
- Elliptical (disambiguation)
- Three dots (disambiguation)
