= Elliptical =

Elliptical may mean:

- having the shape of an ellipse, or more broadly, any oval shape
  - in botany, having an elliptic leaf shape
  - of aircraft wings, having an elliptical planform
- characterised by ellipsis (the omission of words), or by concision more broadly
- elliptical trainer, an exercise machine
- in slang, a derogatory term for people of Portuguese descent

== See also ==
- Ellipse (disambiguation)
- Ellipsis (disambiguation)
