= Alma Stone Williams =

African-American musician, educator, music scholar, and pioneer in racial integration

- Born: Alma Stone; April 26, 1921; Athens, GA
- Died: November 5, 2013 (aged 92); Savannah, GA
- Education: Spelman College; Atlanta University; Black Mountain College; Juilliard School; University of Maryland
- Occupations: Professor, Musician, Music teacher
- Known for: First African-American student to attend the Black Mountain College, 1944

Alma Stone Williams (April 26, 1921 - November 5, 2013) was a musician, educator, music scholar, and pioneer in racial integration. Williams attended the 1944 Summer Music Institute. She was the first African-American student to be enrolled at Black Mountain College and the first black student to openly integrate a Southern white college.

== Education ==
Alma Stone Williams was highly educated. She attended Spelman College at the age of 15, majoring in English and music, and graduating valedictorian. Afterwards, she received her M.A. degree in English from Atlanta University. Williams began her teaching career at Penn School on St. Helena Island in South Carolina. Afterwards, educator Horace Mann Bond hired Williams to teach at Fort Valley State College; furthermore, he nominated her to attend Black Mountain College in the summer of 1944. In the spring of 1944, Mrs. Williams received her first scholarship from the Rosenwald Fund to make her attendance at Black Mountain possible.

In 1944, Williams became the first black student at Black Mountain College, ten years before the United States Supreme Court's decision in Brown v. Board of Education of Topeka declaring state laws establishing separate public schools for black and white students to be unconstitutional. In a 2008 profile in the Asheville, North Carolina Urban News; Williams commented on her pioneering desegregation:

"Pioneering did not frighten me. I was accustomed to studying and living with white teachers at Spelman and to reaching for high standards in all areas."

In 1945, after attending Black Mountain College, Williams received a second Julius Rosenwald Fellowship to attend Juilliard in New York City. Later on, Williams received a second master's degree in musicology, from the University of Maryland, where she wrote an acclaimed master's thesis on Brahms.

== Career & retirement ==
At Fort Valley State College, where she returned to teach, Williams married a professor, Russell Williams Sr. They eventually settled in Orangeburg, SC where he taught at South Carolina State, and she taught part-time at Claflin University and South Carolina State and gave private music lessons to many children. Her primary instrument was piano, although she also played organ. She taught piano and was also valued as an accompanist for singers. After her husband's early death, she took a full-time position in English at South Carolina State, while continuing to teach privately and raising their five children. The family later moved to Savannah, Georgia where Mrs. Williams joined the Humanities faculty at Savannah State. Alma Stone Williams retired with two decades experience as a highly respected professor of English and Humanities at Savannah State.

In retirement, Williams was co-founder of SONATA (Sponsors of New and Talented Artists), an organization that provides funds for children of Savannah to study music with former members of the Savannah Symphony Orchestra and other music professionals.

== Legacy ==
Williams is featured in "Fully Awake," a documentary about Black Mountain College released in 2008. As of 2013, there were two other films in process about Williams.

Williams' account of her time at Black Mountain College is included in the publication Black Mountain College: Sprouted Seeds: an Anthology of Personal Accounts.

Letters and ephemera relating to Alma Stone Williams' life and her integration of Black Mountain College are held in the collections of the State Archives of North Carolina's western regional branch, the Asheville Art Museum archives, and the Black Mountain College Museum + Arts Center.

== See also ==
- Desegregation
