= Lauren Silva =

American painter

- Born: 1987 (age 38–39); Vallejo, California
- Known for: Visual Art

Lauren Silva (born 1987 in Vallejo, California) is an American painter based in New York City, United States.

== Career ==
Lauren Silva obtained a Bachelor in Visual Art from the University of California, Los Angeles. At UCLA, Silva was mentored by painting professor Lari Pittman.

Silva is a visiting critic in the Visual Arts department at Columbia University, where she obtained her Master of Fine Arts. Silva mainly produces painted work on silk and large-scale paintings in abstracted forms. Roberta Smith of the New York Times called her "a painter to watch" as her painting exhibits "astuteness and aplomb." She writes, "Ms. Silva's elaborately layered compositions force various techniques, styles and spatial notions into carefully orchestrated collisions."

Silva is currently pursuing a Master of Business Administration at Columbia Business School.

== Awards ==
- 2013 Toby Devan Lewis Award, Columbia University, New York, NY
- 2011-13 Visual Arts Fellowship, Columbia University, New York, NY
- 2011 Scholarship, Skowhegan School of Painting and Sculpture, Skowhegan, ME 2009-10 Emma B. Keller Award
