= Tony Greene (artist) =

Tony Greene (1955, San Francisco, CA - 1990, Los Angeles, CA) was a visual artist whose work combines photographic imagery with an overlay of thickly applied decorative patterns or calligraphic letterforms. Rarely exhibited during his lifetime (he died of AIDS-related illness at age 35), his work has subsequently staged what the Los Angeles Times describes as "a remarkable posthumous comeback," including a mini-retrospective of Greene's work as part of the 2014 Whitney Biennial exhibition, and additional exhibitions held in Chicago and Los Angeles during 2014, including the UCLA Hammer Museum's biennial "Made in LA" exhibition.

Greene was awarded an MFA degree from California Institute of the Arts in 1987. His classmates there included the artists Richard Hawkins and Catherine Opie, who jointly curated Greene's 2014 exhibition in the Whitney Biennial.

David Evans Frantz, curator at ONE National Gay & Lesbian Archives curated a "show within a show" in the Hammer Museum's Made in LA Biennial, featuring Tony Greene's opulent paintings from 1987 to 1990, alongside queer and activist artists, documents, and ephemera in dialogue with his work.
