= Ellipse (disambiguation) =

In mathematics, an ellipse is a geometrical figure.

Ellipse may also refer to:

- MacAdam ellipse, an area in a chromaticity diagram
- Elliptic leaf shape
- Superellipse, a geometric figure

As a name, ellipse, elliptic, or elliptical may also be:

- The Ellipse, an area in Washington, D.C., United States
- Ellipse Animation, a French animation studio.
- Elipse, a Yugoslav rock band
- Ellipse, a 2009 album by Imogen Heap
- "Ellipse", a song from the album In Silence We Yearn by Oh Hiroshima
- Explorer Ellipse, an American homebuilt aircraft design
- La société Ellipse, a French aircraft manufacturer
- Elliptic, a British blockchain analytics firm
- Elliptical trainer, a stationary exercise machine

== Similar terms ==
- Ellipsis, a punctuation mark
- Ellipsis, a rhetorical suppression of words to give an expression more liveliness
- Eclipse, an astronomical event
- Ellipsoid, a two-dimensional surface analogous to the one-dimensional ellipse curve

== See also ==
- Ellipsis (disambiguation)
- Elliptical (disambiguation)
- Oval (disambiguation)
