= Lari Pittman =

American painter

- Born: 1952 (age 73–74); Glendale, California
- Known for: Visual Art
- Notable work: Like You (1995), Fly Carpet with Magic Mirrors for a Distorted Nation (2013), Wholesomeness, Beloved and Despised, Continues Regardless (1989)
- Movement: Contemporary art
- Spouse: Roy Dowell
- Awards: Honorary Doctorate Rhode Island School of Design, Skowhegan Medal Skowhegan School of Painting and Sculpture, Fellowship National Endowment for the Arts
- Website: http://www.regenprojects.com/artists/lari-pittman

Lari George Pittman (born 1952 in Glendale, California) is a Colombian-American contemporary artist and painter. Pittman is an Emeritus Distinguished Professor of Painting and Drawing at the UCLA School of the Arts and Architecture.

== Early life ==
Pittman's American father met his Colombian mother while the former was working abroad in the latter's homeland. At the age of five, Pittman's family moved back to Colombia, returning to California in 1963. In contrast to his childhood in Colombia, Pittman's experience in the United States keeps him alert to "the overwhelming hatred that is exhibited by the American population and through actual legislation against homosexuals.”

== Career ==
Pittman received his MFA from Cal Arts in 1976 studying with Elizabeth Murray, Vija Celmins, and Miriam Schapiro. Afterwards, Pittman began working in the interior design business with Angelo Donghia, where he worked with music and entertainment clientele. Pittman was the singular male student within the Feminist program in the 1970s. During this time, Pittman began showing his work at Rosamund Felsen Gallery. Pittman asserts, "One of my strongest memories from those years is of how patterning and color were so relentlessly gendered." He continues, "I’d show somebody a textile or something, and a common answer would be, no, that’s too feminine, or it’s too masculine. Always within the framework of gender construction binaries. In 1985, Pittman was shot at his Silver Lake apartment and recovered from gun shot wounds. This experience would forever impact his work and further his determination to paint large-scale.

In David Pagel's interview with Pittman, he concludes that Pittman's paintings include "imaginary organic forms, runaway arrows, and arabesques, transform ornamentation into a contemporary narrative of life and death, love and sex." He also believes "Pittman's operatic pictures propose that the world's complexities does not override passion, sincerity, and individuality." When talking about his own work, Pittman states: "at times, I purposefully orchestrate the work so that you do have that comfortable laughter when looking at it—it's full-hearted and enjoyable internally—but it's also a laughter linked to nervousness. And that's the laughter I particularly like cultivating, parlor laughter, where there's always the subtext of conversation going on, but everyone is very agreeable." Mayer Russ of Architectural Digest writes, "Pittman’s obsessions—political and personal trauma, with an incisive eye on the lamentable state of current world affairs—is a welcome tonic to the glittery, Koons-and-Hirst-variety theatrics that often dominate contemporary art discourse." Pittman targets colonial dismemberment in his newest body of work.

As a Professor of Painting at UCLA, Pittman mentored artists including Amadour, Elliott Hundley, Lauren Silva, and Toba Khedoori. In 1998, he was part of the search committee that selected Ann Philbin as director of the Hammer Museum.

== Exhibitions ==
In 1996 Pittman's work was the subject of a mid career survey at the Los Angeles County Museum of Art. Describing his work as "encumbered, tethered, tied-in, [and[ chaperoned,” Leah Olmen of ArtNews asserts Pittman's work is about "History and sexuality, memory and experience, philosophy and poetry, humor and rage share the stage in exquisite imbalance, the whole a manifesto against reductionism and an endorsement."

In 2016, The Huntington exhibited Lari Pittman: Mood Books, an exhibit of six monumental illustrated books.

In 2019, Pittman had a solo retrospective show titled "Declaration of Independence" at the Hammer Museum in Westwood, Los Angeles. Christopher Knight of the Los Angeles Times recalled, "For the first time, the Hammer has turned over virtually all its main exhibition spaces to a comprehensive survey of a single artist — a testament to his singular achievement and broad influence." Knight expands, "Pittman’s work is often discussed in terms of its radical commitments to adornment. Spectacular gardens, decorated eggs, blue and white porcelains, Dutch still lifes and Spanish interiors, ladies and gentlemen taking tea in drawing rooms — the list is endless, stuffed into jam-packed paintings."

Pittman's first solo show in South Korea opened at Lehmann Maupin in Seoul.

Pittman is currently represented by Regen Projects in Los Angeles.

== Collections ==
Pittman is included in several esteemed art collections including the Eli and Edythe Broad collection at The Broad in Los Angeles, United States.

== Personal life ==
Pittman considers himself to be an atheist. At CalArts, Pittman met his partner Roy Dowell with whom he has lived ever since. Together Pittman and Dowell lived in a 1952 Richard Neutra home called the "Dorothy Serulnic Residence" and an adjacent Michael Maltzan home. Flea (musician) of the Red Hot Chili Peppers purchased the property in 2019 for $4.25 million. The Neutra house is currently on the market again. Pittman currently resides in the Los Feliz neighborhood of Los Angeles.

== Awards and honors ==
Board Memberships:

- 2015 – 2018: MOCA, Los Angeles, Artist on the Board of Trustees
- 2008 – present: Hammer Museum, Los Angeles, Board of Overseers

Awards:

- 2013 International Association of Art Critics United States Exhibition Award Winner
- 2012 International Association of Art Critics Award
- 2011 Hammer Museum Gala in the Garden Honoree
- 2006 Rhode Island School of Design Honorary Doctorate
- 2004 Pacific Design Center Stars of Design 2004 Award for Art
- 2002 Skowhegan School of Painting and Sculpture Skowhegan Medal
- 1999/2000 Flintridge Foundation Award for Visual Artists
- 1993 National Endowment for the Arts Fellowship Grant in Painting
- 1990 California Arts Council Arts Fellowship Grant in Painting
- 1989 National Endowment for the Arts Fellowship Grant in Painting
- 1989 J. Paul Getty Trust Fund for the Visual Arts Fellowship Grant in Painting
- 1987 National Endowment for the Arts Fellowship Grant in Painting
- 1986 Art Matters, Inc. Grant

== Public collections ==
- Akron Art Museum, Akron, OH
- Albright-Knox Art Gallery, Buffalo, NY
- Amorepacific Museum of Art, Seoul, Korea
- Art Institute of Chicago, Chicago, IL
- Astrup Fearnley Museum of Modern Art, Oslo, Norway
- The Broad, Los Angeles, CA
- Carnegie Museum of Art, Pittsburgh, PA
- Chapman University, Orange, CA
- Fondazione Sandretto Re Rebaudengo, Torino, Italy
- The Frances Young Tang Teaching Museum and Art Gallery, Skidmore College, Saratoga *Springs, NY
- Sammlung Goetz, Munich, Germany
- Harvard Art Museums, Cambridge, MA
- Los Angeles County Museum of Art, Los Angeles, CA
- Marciano Art Foundation, Los Angeles, CA
- Museum of Contemporary Art Chicago, Chicago, IL
- Museum of Contemporary Art, Los Angeles, CA
- Museum of Contemporary Art, Monterrey, Mexico
- Museum of Modern Art, New York, NY
- Museo Jumex, Mexico City, Mexico
- National Gallery of Art, Washington, D.C.
- Newport Harbor Art Museum, Newport Beach, CA
- Palm Springs Art Museum, Palm Springs, CA
- Peter Norton Family Foundation, Santa Monica, CA
- Phoenix Art Museum, Phoenix, AZ
- Rhode Island School of Design Museum, Providence, RI
- The Rose Art Museum, Brandeis University, Waltham, MA
- San Francisco Museum of Modern Art, San Francisco, CA
- Santa Barbara Museum of Art, Santa Barbara, CA
- Sheldon Memorial Art Gallery, Lincoln, NE
- Hammer Museum, Los Angeles, CA
- Weatherspoon Art Museum, The University of North Carolina, Greensboro, NC
- The Whitney Museum of American Art, New York, NY
- Yale University Art Gallery, New Haven, CT
- Zabludowicz Collection, London, UK
