= Dorothea Rockburne =

Canadian-American painter (born 1929)

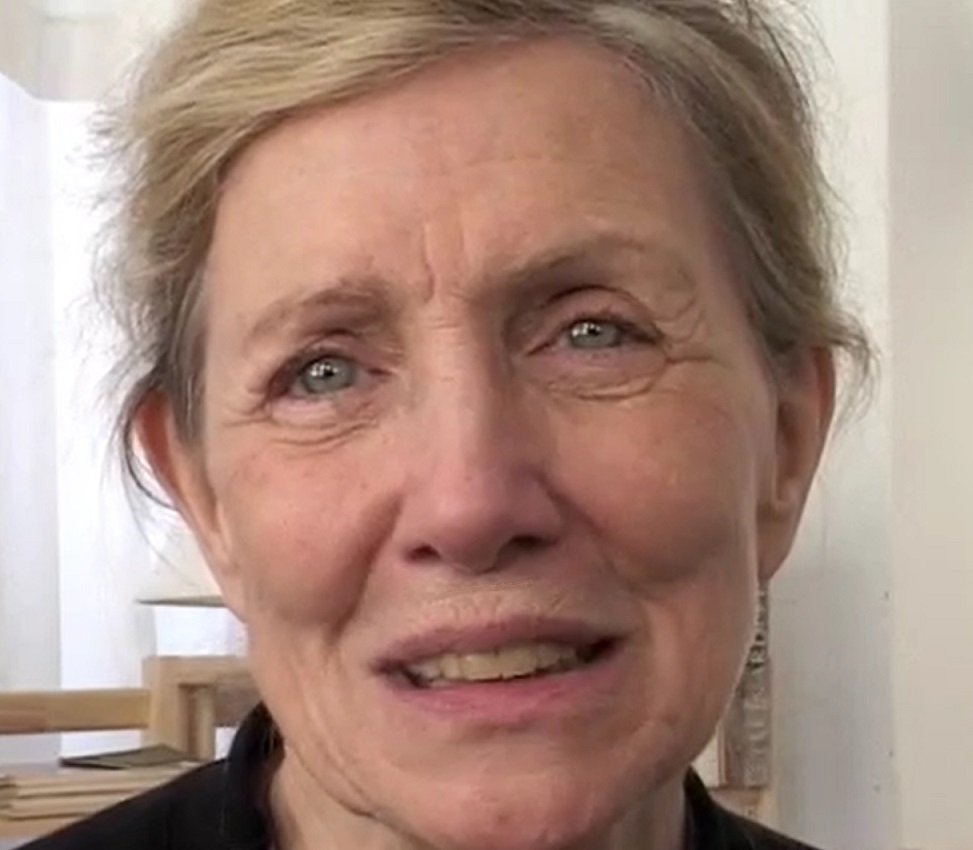
- Rockburne in Speaking Portraits c.2003
- Born: 1929 (age 96–97); Montreal, Quebec, Canada
- Education: Black Mountain College
- Known for: Mathematician, Astronomer, Abstract Artist
- Website: dorothearockburne.com

Dorothea Rockburne (born 1929) is a Canadian abstract painter, drawing inspiration primarily from her deep interest in mathematics and astronomy. Her work is geometric and abstract, seemingly simple but very precise to reflect the mathematical concepts she strives to concretize. "I wanted very much to see the equations I was studying, so I started making them in my studio," she has said. "I was visually solving equations." Her attraction to Mannerism has also influenced her work.

== Career ==
In 1950, Rockburne moved to the United States to attend Black Mountain College, where she studied with mathematician Max Dehn, a lifelong influence on her work. In addition to Dehn, she studied with Franz Kline, Philip Guston, John Cage, and Merce Cunningham. She also met fellow student Robert Rauschenberg. In 1955, Rockburne moved to New York City where she met many of the leading artists and poets of the time. She was influenced by the minimalist dances of Yvonne Rainer and the Judson Dance Theater.

Balance (1985) at the Whitney Museum in 2023.

Throughout her career, she created paintings that expressed mathematical concepts. In 1958, a solo show of her work was critically and financially successful but deemed "not good enough" by Rockburne herself. She did not publicly show her work again for more than a decade, turning her attention to dance and performance art by 1960. Rockburne participated in performances at the Judson Dance Theater and took classes at the American Ballet Theatre. During that time she supported her daughter, Christine, by working as a waitress and a studio manager for her friend Robert Rauschenberg. Bykert Gallery, in New York, which also represented Chuck Close and Brice Marden, began showing her work in 1970.

Rockburne's series of installations, Set Theories, included works such as Intersection, which attempted to merge two of her other pieces of art (Group and Disjunction) to illustrate the mathematical concept of intersection. The series later led to her experimentation with new concepts and materials, such as Gold Section and carbon paper. In 2011, a retrospective exhibition of her work was shown at the Parrish Art Museum in Water Mill, New York, and in 2013, the Museum of Modern Art hosted a solo show of her drawings.

Dorothea Rockburne: Drawing Which Makes Itself (The Museum of Modern Art)
- https://www.youtube.com/watch?v=AN2DJxMLFOw

Rockburne is a member of the American Academy of Arts and Letters, National Academy of Design, and The Century Association. In 2016, Rockburne earned a doctorate degree at Bowdoin College. In 2009 Rockburne became an Honorary Vice President of the National Association of Women Artists, the first women's professional fine art organization founded in the United States. She is also a member of the American Abstract Artists.

Rockburne's work was included in the 2021 exhibition Women in Abstraction at the Centre Pompidou.

== Works ==
- Fire Engine Red. 1967. Wrinkle finish paint (oil) on aluminum. University of Michigan Museum of Art, Ann Arbor.
- Scalar. 1971. Chipboard, crude oil, paper and nails. Museum of Modern Art, New York.
- Locus. 1972. Series of six relief etching and aquatints on folded paper. Museum of Modern Art, New York.
- Golden Section Painting #6. 1975. Kraft paper and blue pencil on linen. University of Michigan Museum of Art, Ann Arbor.
- Cosmic Moment, 1997. Reflection hologram, 15 11/16 × 11 11/16 in. J. Paul Getty Museum.
- Triangle, 1978. Vellum paper, varnish, glue, color pencil, ragboard; 42 3/4 x 33 in. Museum of Contemporary Art, Los Angeles.
- F.P.I. 19, 1973. Pen on folded paper, 29 x 40 in. Museum of Contemporary Art, Los Angeles.
- Robe Series, The Descent, 1976. Gesso, varnish, glue, and oil on linen, 55 1/2 × 36 in. Philadelphia Museum of Art.
