= Steve Locke =

American artist (born 1963)

- Born: 1963 (age 62–63); Cleveland, Ohio, U.S.
- Education: Massachusetts College of Art and Design
- Website: www.stevelocke.com

Steve Locke (born 1963) is an American conceptual artist who explores figuration and perceptions of the male figure, and themes of masculinity and homosexuality through drawing, painting, sculpture and installation art. He lives and works in upstate New York and in Brooklyn where he teaches at Pratt Institute.

== Early life and education ==
Locke was born in Cleveland, Ohio, and raised in Detroit, Michigan. He is African-American. He spent the summer of 2002 at Skowhegan School of Painting and Sculpture in Skowhegan, Maine. He received his MFA from the Massachusetts College of Art and Design in 2001 and holds Bachelor's degrees from Boston University and Massachusetts College of Art and Design.

== Career and work ==
Steve Locke, there is no one left to blame, 2013, ICA Boston

Locke’s art explores the meaning applied to male portraiture. His works comprise several portraits of men - for almost a decade, he has reworked the particular gesture of a man with his tongue hanging out of his open mouth. "It’s hard to make a painting of a man and not have him look important. So I came up with this weird gesture," Locke explained in an interview with the Institute of Contemporary Art, Boston. "I like that they’re not heroic, and not attached to any body," he said of his pieces, which straddle the line between sculpture and painting. "They’re floating around in the atmosphere, waiting to possess somebody, or get inside your head and transform you." He aims to "make paintings of men who were vulnerable, or exposed, without using the obvious trope of nudity." His work provokes broader social, sexual and art historical conversations.

Locke is a former professor at Massachusetts College of Art and Design in Boston, and currently teaches at the Pratt Institute. Locke was awarded the Art Matters grant, visiting Istanbul in 2007 to see the Blue Mosque and the Hagia Sophia with a specific interest in exploring themes such as patterning, decoration, calligraphy, and wall painting. In 2008, he was the visiting professor and artist in residence at the Savannah College of Art and Design. In 2024, he joined the Board of Governors at Skowhegan School of Painting and Sculpture.

Since his first solo exhibition in 1996, Guys with Ties and other Portraits – New Paintings, at the Noonan Gallery in Cambridge, MA, Locke has been the subject of several exhibitions. These include 'Some Men at the Patricia Doran Gallery in Boston, MA (2000), Rapture/New Work at Samsøn Projects in Boston (2009), Companions at Mendes Wood in São Paulo, Brazil (2009), there is no one left to blame, curated by Helen Molesworth at the Institute of Contemporary Art in Boston, traveled to the Museum of Contemporary Art Detroit (2013), and that last time we touched the water at the Hudson Opera House in Hudson, NY (2015). In 2016, Locke was the Artist-in-Residence at the Isabella Stewart Gardner Museum in Boston, where he was soon afterwards invited to create a site-specific artwork for the museum's façade. The work, called Three Deliberate Grays for Freddie (A Memorial for Freddie Gray), was created to address contemporary issues on race and violence in America, and was installed in 2018.

Locke has been in several group exhibitions including Feedback at Jack Shaman Gallery in Kinderhook, NY, superSalon at Samsøñ Projects in Boston, MA (2004) White Boys, curated by Hank Willis Thomas and Natasha L. Logan, at the Cantor Fitzgerald Gallery Haverford College (2013), and Recent Acquisitions at the Leslie-Lohman Museum of Art (2013). He was awarded the Pollock-Krasner award in 2014. In 2020, he was awarded a Guggenheim Fellowship, and in 2022 he received the Rappaport Prize from the deCordova Sculpture Park and Museum. He is represented by Alexander Gray Associates in New York, and LaMontagne Gallery in Boston, Massachusetts.

== Publications ==
- Steve Locke: homage to the auction block, Boston, MA: LaMontagne Gallery, 2020
- There is no one left to blame, Boston, MA: Steve Locke: Samsøn publications, ©2014
- Steve Locke: there is no one left to blame, Boston, MA: The Institute of Contemporary Art/Boston, 2013
