= Letha Wilson =

American artist

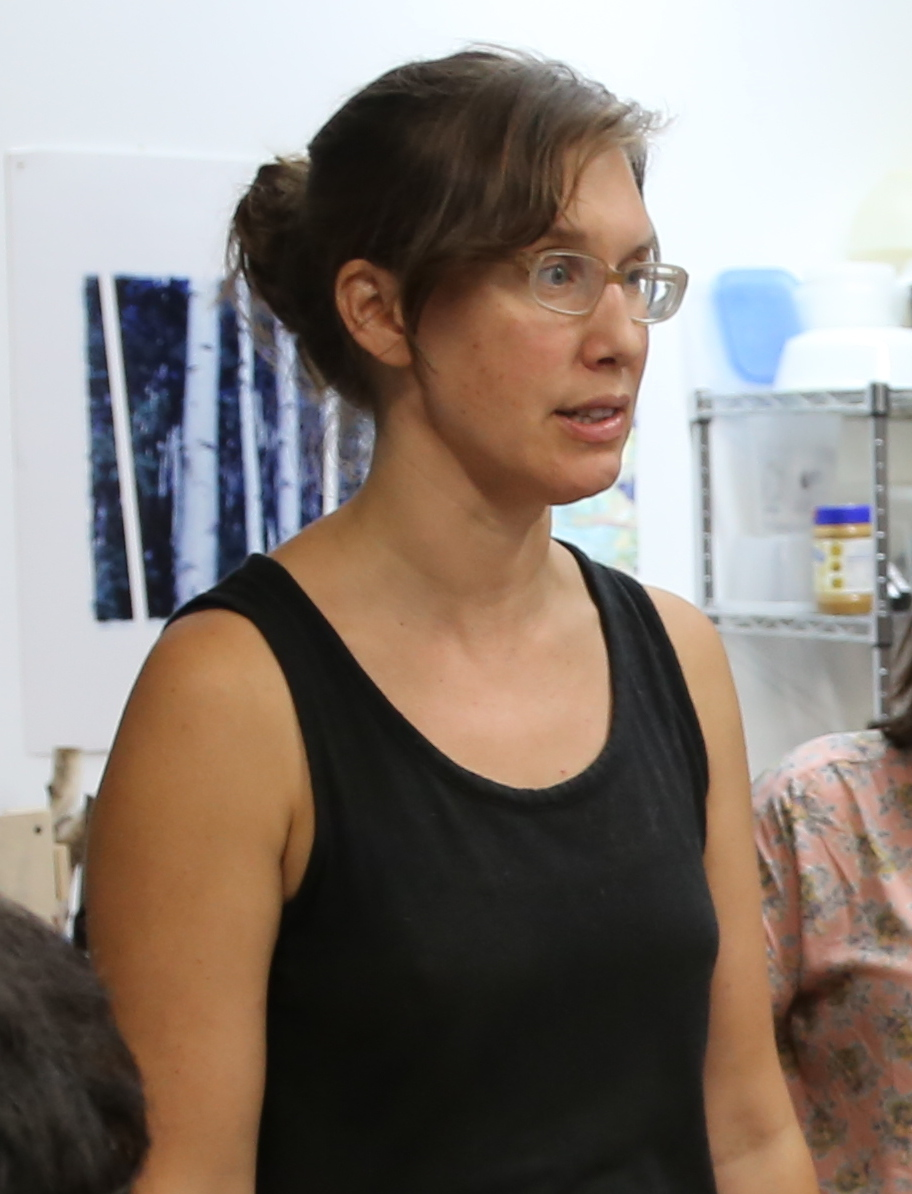
- New York Arts Practicum visits Letha Wilson, 2014
- Born: 1976 (age 49–50); Honolulu, Hawaii, U.S.
- Education: BFA, Syracuse University; MFA, Hunter College
- Occupation: Artist

Letha Wilson (born 1976) is an American artist working in photography and sculpture. She received her BFA from Syracuse University and her MFA from Hunter College. She currently lives in Brooklyn, NY. Her work has been exhibited at The Studio Museum in Harlem, Bronx Museum of the Arts, Bemis Center for Contemporary Art, International Center of Photography, and Hauser & Wirth, among others.

In 2013, Wilson was the recipient of a New York Foundation for the Arts Fellowship in Photography. Wilson was also awarded a Jerome Foundation Travel Grant in 2014. She has attended residencies at the Skowhegan School of Painting and Sculpture. In July 2018, Wilson was recognized by Artsy through her inclusion on their list 'These 20 Female Artists Are Pushing Sculpture Forward'.

== Artwork ==
Wilson often combines large-scale landscape photographs with sculptural elements of metal and concrete, challenging the two-dimensional nature of traditional photography. She is influenced by the landscape of the American West and by the land artists of the 1960s and 1970s, such as Michael Heizer. In the creation of her work, she often cuts or folds her photographic prints. She works with both darkroom and digital photography, as well as with C-prints and emulsion transfers.

== Exhibitions ==
=== Selected solo shows ===
2026 "Letha Wilson", Grimm Gallery, New York, NY

2023 "Ground Spell", Richard and Dolly Maas Gallery, Purchase College, State University of New York at Purchase, Purchase, NY

2022 "Folds and Faults", Higher Pictures Generations, Brooklyn, NY

2021 "Valley of Fire", Galerie Christophe Gaillard, Paris, FR

2019 "Cross Country", GRIMM Gallery, Amsterdam, NL

2018 "Horizon Eyes" at GRIMM Gallery in New York City.

2017 "Platform 19: Letha Wilson", deCordova Sculpture Park and Museum, Lincoln, MA

=== Selected group shows ===
2020 "New Visions: The Henie Onstad Triennial for Photography and New Media", Henie Onstad Kunstsenter, Oslo, Norway

2019 "New Landscapes: Contemporary Responses to Globalization", Hood Museum of Art, Dartmouth College, Hanover, NH.

2018 "Fold and Unfold: Kate Steciw and Letha Wilson", at MACRO, Museo d'Arte Contemporanea, Rome, Italy's

2018 "Anna Atkins Refracted: Contemporary Works", Stephen A. Schwarzman Building, The New York Public Library, New York, NY

2017 "In The Abstract" at Massachusetts Museum of Contemporary Art (MASS MoCA), North Adams, MA

2016 "The sun placed in the abyss", Columbus Museum of Art, Columbus, OH

2014 "What is a Photograph?", International Center of Photography, New York, NY

== Awards ==
2022 Windgate Artist in Residence, Purchase College, State University of New York

2021-2022 Anna Ballarian Visiting Artist, Rochester Institute of Technology, Rochester, NY

2019 New York Foundation for the Arts Fellowship in Photography

2014 The Jerome Foundation Visual Arts Travel and Study Grant

2013 New York Foundation for the Arts Fellowship in Photography (Deutsche Bank Fellow)
