= Elysian (disambiguation) =

Elysian, Elysium, or Elysian Fields of Ancient Greek mythology, was a conception of the afterlife in Ancient Greek mythology where mortals related to the gods, the heroic and the virtuous, could rest in a blessed and happy life after death.

Elysian may also refer to:

- Elysian, Chicago, a 60-story skyscraper
- Elysian, Minnesota, a city, United States
- Lake Elysian, Minnesota, an unincorporated community, United States
- The Elysian, a 17-storey skyscraper in Cork, Ireland
- Elysian Brewing Company, a brewery in Seattle, Washington, United States
- Elysian, an Armstrong Whitworth Ensign aircraft
- MY Elysian, a yacht built in 2014 by Lürssen

== See also ==
- Elysian Charter School, Hoboken, New Jersey
- Elysian Fields (disambiguation)
- Elysian Heights, Los Angeles, California
- Elysian Park, a park in Los Angeles, California
- Elysian Township, Le Sueur County, Minnesota
- Elysian Valley, Los Angeles, California
