= California Academy of Studio Arts =

Nonprofit arts institution in California, US

California Academy of Studio Arts (CASA), is a nonprofit, non-accredited fine arts institution and interdisciplinary studio program, located on the historic former campus of the San Francisco Art Institute (SFAI).

== History and development ==
In September 2023, a nonprofit consortium, BMA Institute (BMAI), led by philanthropist Laurene Powell Jobs, including Brenda Way, founder and artistic director of San Francisco’s Oberlin Dance Collective, and David Stull, President of the San Francisco Conservatory of Music, announced its plan to purchase the former San Francisco Art Institute (SFAI) campus at 800 Chestnut, with the stated intention of continuing its use as an arts institution. Jobs would provide the preliminary endowment to buy the property and fund the new organization. On November 9th, the San Francisco Planning Commission unanimously approved changing the zoning at 800 Chestnut to a nonprofit, non-accredited arts‑education Special Use District, paving the way for BMAI to realize its vision for the former arts campus. In December, the US Bankruptcy Court overseeing the San Francisco Art Institute approved an agreement allowing the newly formed BMAI nonprofit to pay off the SFAI's accumulated debt of roughly $20 million and purchase the 93,000-square-foot Russian Hill campus, all its assets, including the land, library, and the landmark 1931 Diego Rivera mural The Making of a Fresco, Showing the Building of a City, for a total amount of around $30 million.

=== Architectural restoration ===
Financial difficulties left the former SFAI campus in disrepair and neglect. The property comprises two attached architectural features: the original historic landmark, a 1926 Spanish colonial building (designed by Bakewell & Brown), and the 1960s Brutalist addition (designed by Paffard Keatinge-Clay), both of which suffered structural problems and wear and tear that required rehabilitation and modernization. In August 2024, BMA-Institute announced that Jensen Architects had been selected to lead the campus improvements and historical rehabilitation and develop a strategy to move forward. In March 2025, Page & Turnbull, an architecture firm specializing in historic preservation and planning, was contracted to handle the historic preservation and rehabilitation to ensure all proposed designs complied with local preservation laws for the two attached historic buildings, filing an application with the San Francisco Planning Department to obtain approval for the extensive renovation and adaptive reuse plans for the former San Francisco Art Institute (SFAI) campus. Interior architecture and design collaborators Laplace began working alongside Jensen in June to design the internal environments and layouts for the communal dining space, residential artist quarters, and interior meeting areas while maintaining the campus's original character and creative atmosphere.

=== Arts education program ===
In early 2024, BMA-Institute assembled an advisory group of arts leaders, led by curator, critic, and art historian Hans Ulrich Obrist and CASA Director Abbye Churchill, to conduct global "Listening Forums" and gather insights from the creative community before unveiling the institution's curriculum in June 2025. BMA-Institute then announced that the campus at 800 Chestnut will operate as the California Academy of Studio Arts (CASA), loosely based on the studio-oriented, unaccredited learning environment of Black Mountain College.

Plans are to open the Russian Hill campus once construction is complete, as early as 2027 or as late as 2030. CASA has said it will offer an annual, tuition-free, studio-based program for up to 30 emerging visual artists. It will also offer public access to exhibitions, artist talks, lectures, live performances, and the historic 1931 Diego Rivera mural.
