= Buon fresco =

Fresco painting technique

Buon fresco (Italian for 'true fresh') is a fresco painting technique in which alkaline-resistant pigments, ground in water, are applied to wet plaster. It is distinguished from the fresco-secco (or a secco) and finto fresco techniques, in which paints are applied to dried plaster.

== Description ==
The buon fresco technique consists of painting with pigment ground in water on a thin layer of wet, fresh, lime mortar or plaster, for which the Italian word is intonaco. Because of the chemical makeup of the plaster, a binder is not required. However, some artists used lime as a binding medium for pigment to slow the drying process of the plaster and continue working for longer periods of time.

After a number of hours the plaster reacts with the air in a process called carbonatation. This chemical reaction fixes the pigment particles at the plaster's surface in a protective crystalline mesh known as the lime crust.

The advantage of buon fresco is its durability. In fresco-secco, by contrast, the color does not become part of the wall and tends to flake off over time. The chief disadvantage of buon fresco is that it must be done quickly without mistakes.

The painter plasters and paints only as much as can be completed in a day, which explains the Italian term for each of these sections, giornata, or a day's work. The size of a giornata varies according to the complexity of the painting within it. A face, for instance, might take an entire day, whereas large areas of sky can be painted quite rapidly. Buon frescoes are usually done in sections because of the time limitations plaster provides.

== History ==
Frescoes dating from the 17th century BC using this technique have been found in the excavations of Akrotiri on the island of Santorini in Greece, changing our beliefs about art in prehistoric times. One of the first painters in the post-classical period to use this technique was the Isaac Master in the Upper Basilica of Saint Francis in Assisi.

In medieval and Renaissance Italy, a wall to be frescoed was first prepared with a rough, thick undercoat of plaster known as the arriccio. When this was dry, assistants copied the master painter's composition onto it with reddish-brown pigment or charcoal. The artist made any necessary adjustments. Artists that used the buon fresco technique include Raphael, Masaccio, and Michaelangelo. Many renaissance artists painted buon frescoes as backgrounds or under-paintings before they painted seccos on the dry plaster. It takes many days for the carbonization of intonaco, so days would have to elapse between painting the buon fresco and fresco-secco. Some ingredients used in secco were incompatible with the wet plaster and could result in incorrect pigmentation.

== See also ==
- Fresco painting (techniques)
- Fresco paintings (works)

== Notes ==
=== References ===
- Stokstad, Marilyn; Art History, 2011, 4th ed., ISBN 0-205-79094-1
- Tsuji, Shigeru. “The Origins of Buon Fresco.” Zeitschrift Für Kunstgeschichte, vol. 46, no. 2, 1983, pp. 215–22. JSTOR, https://doi.org/10.2307/1482206. Retrieved 12 October 2024.
