= Oval City, Ohio =

- Unincorporated community
- Location within Ohio Location within the United States
- Coordinates: 40°53′45″N 81°19′38″W
- Country: United States
- State: Ohio
- County: Stark
- Elevation: 1,122 ft (342 m)
- Time zone: UTC-5 (Eastern (EST))
  - Summer (DST): UTC-4 (EDT)
- Area codes: 330, 234
- GNIS feature ID: 1057422

Oval City is an unincorporated community in Plain Township, Stark County, Ohio, United States.
