= Susan Dackerman =

Art historian, professor and author

- Born: January 10, 1964 (age 62); New York City
- Education: Vassar College; Bryn Mawr College
- Occupation: Art Historian

Susan Dackerman (born 1964) is an American art historian. Dackerman worked at the Baltimore Museum of Art, Harvard Art Museums, Getty Research Institute, and Stanford University.

== Early life and education ==
Born in New York City in 1964, Dackerman attended public schools on Long Island, received an A.B. in History of Art from Vassar College and a Ph.D. in Art History from Bryn Mawr College.

== Career ==
Susan Dackerman began her career at the Baltimore Museum of Art in 1995 as an Assistant Curator, eventually becoming an Associate Curator (1998-99), and finally served as Curator, Department of Prints, Drawings, Photographs, and Illustrated Books from 1999 to 2004. From 2005 through 2015, Dackerman served as Carl A. Weyerhaeuser Curator of Prints at the Harvard Art Museums, where she directed collaborative exhibition projects and produced publications, involving faculty, students, conservators, librarians, and museum educators. Dackerman also participated in the planning for the architectural renovation and re-installation of the Harvard Art Museums building.

From 2015 to 2017, Dackerman was a Getty Scholar at the Getty Research Institute (GRI) in Los Angeles. As GRI Consortium Professor in 2017, Dackerman taught the graduate seminar, “Art and Anthropology,” to students from an association of southern California universities. In 2017, Dackerman was appointed director of Cantor Center for Visual Arts at Stanford University where she oversaw the artistic program and operations of the university's art museum.

In November 2020, Dackerman resigned as director of Cantor Arts Center after an external investigation reported that she had created a toxic work environment leading to high staff turnover.

== Publications ==
- Dürer's Knots: Early European Print and the Islamic East, Princeton University Press, 2024.
- A Gallery Guide to the Melancholy Museum: Love, Death, and Mourning at Stanford – A Mark Dion Project, edited by Susan Dackerman and Paula Findlen, Cantor Arts Center, Stanford University, 2019
- “Dürer’s Melencolia I: An Allegory of Creation,” in Inspired: Essays in Honor of Susan Donahue Kuretsky, Poughkeepsie: Frances Lehman Loeb Center at Vassar College, 2018
- Jasper Johns: A Catalogue Raisonné of the Monotypes, with Jennifer Roberts, Matthew Marks Gallery and Yale University Press, 2017
- Corita Kent and the Language of Pop, edited by Susan Dackerman, with essays by Julia Bryan-Wilson, Susan Dackerman, Richard Meyer, and Jennifer Roberts, Cambridge: Harvard Art Museums with Yale University Press, 2015
- Prints and the Pursuit of Knowledge in Early Modern Europe, edited by Susan Dackerman, with essays by Susan Dackerman, Lorraine Daston, Katharine Park, Suzanne Karr Schmidt, and Claudia Swan, Cambridge: Harvard Art Museums with Yale University Press, 2011
- “Dürer’s Etchings: Printed Drawings?” in The Painter-Etcher in Early Modern Europe, Pennsylvania State University Press, 2006
- Painted Prints: The Revelation of Color in Northern Renaissance and Baroque Engravings, Etchings, and Woodcuts, edited by Susan Dackerman, with essays by Susan Dackerman and Thomas Primeau, The Baltimore Museum of Art and Pennsylvania State University Press, 2002
