= Oval (novel) =

2019 novel by Elvia Wilk

- First edition (publ. Soft Skull
- Author: Elvia Wilk
- Subject: Experimental housing, architectural transformations, designer drugs, and wealth inequality
- Genre: Dystopian fiction
- Set in: Near-future Berlin
- Publication date: 2019

Oval is a 2019 dystopian fiction novel by Elvia Wilk.

== Summary ==
In a near-future Berlin, a young couple move into an experimental housing community on an artificial mountain advertised, receiving free rent on condition of signing a non-disclosure agreement about the conditions in the community with the corporation that runs it. However, the situation takes a turn for the worse when one half of the couple announces that he has invented a drug that promotes generosity and intends to use it as a cure for inequality.

== Themes ==
In an interview with Berlin Art Link, Wilk stated that the inspiration for the artificial mountain in the novel came from a proposed development of Tempelhofer Feld, which she called a "dramatic and megalomaniac statement for visible un-development, which poses an alternative to the constant imperative to densify and maximize urban space." She added that "much of the book is occupied with tracing architectural transformations and tracking how the control of space is central to power struggle in most cities."

Katy Waldman of The New Yorker stated that the novel presents "capitalism as a metastasizing dream," adding that it shows a society that lives in "the end stage of something, whether it’s capitalism or humanity or the earth itself." Kristen Iversen of Nylon stated that the book explores how "the ruling class' adoption of the language of reform and revolution has neutralized it," calling the world of the novel "a late-stage capitalism nightmare."

== Reception ==
Kirkus Reviews called the novel "deeply weird and unsettlingly hilarious," saying that it presented "a near future that’s too plausible for comfort." Michael Friedrich of the Los Angeles Review of Books described the novel as belonging to the postmodernist tradition, saying that it presented a "blistering diagnosis of how today’s social structures have shaped us," adding that it was "astute at rendering the social comedy of our malaise." Alex Ronan of The Nation stated that the book "exquisitely depicts the exhaustion of trying to maintain your footing among the reality distortions of 21st-century companies like Google," but added that "Wilk struggles with the book’s central arc, the titular designer drug with big promises." Jason Sheehan of NPR described the novel as a "slow-growing, smoldering fire that doesn't really dig in and become something until the very, very, very end," saying that while he appreciated the use of the absurd in the book, "the road she took to get there just wasn't interesting enough to make the trip worthwhile."
