= List of New Museum Triennial Artists =

New Museum Triennial
- Wikimedia list article
- Location: New Museum, New York City

This is a list of artists selected for the New Museum Triennial exhibitions of contemporary art, at the New Museum in New York City, USA.

== 2009 ==
The first New Museum Triennial "The Generational Triennial: Younger than Jesus" curated by Massimiliano Gioni was on view from April 8 until July 12, 2009.

- AIDS-3D
- Ziad Antar
- Cory Arcangel
- Tauba Auerbach
- Wojciech Bakowsky
- Dineo Seshee Bopape
- Mohamed Bourouissa
- Kerstin Brätsch
- Cao Fei
- Carolina Caycedo
- Chu Yun
- Keren Cytter
- Mariechen Danz
- Faye Driscoll
- Ida Ekblad
- Haris Epaminonda
- Patricia Esquivias
- Mark Essen
- Ruth Ewan
- Brendan Fowler
- Luke Fowler
- LaToya Ruby Frazier
- Cyprien Gaillard
- Ryan Gander
- Liz Glynn
- Loris Gréaud
- Shilpa Gupta
- Emre Hüner
- Matt Keegan
- Tigran Khachatryan
- Kitty Kraus
- Adriana Lara
- Elad Lassry
- Liu Chuang
- Guthrie Lonergan
- Tala Madani
- Anna Molska
- Ciprian Muresan
- Ahmet Ögüt
- Adam Pendleton
- Stephen G. Rhodes
- James Richards
- Emily Roysdon
- Katerina Šedá
- Josh Smith
- Ryan Trecartin
- Alexander Ugay
- Tris Vonna-Michell
- Jakub Julian Ziolkowski
- Icaro Zorbar

== 2012 ==
The second New Museum Triennial "The Ungovernables" curated by Eungie Joo and Ryan Inouye was on view from February 15 until April 22, 2012.

- Dave McKenzie
- Danh Vo
- Wu Tsang
- Public Movement
- Nicolás Paris
- Slavs and Tatars
- Mounira Al Solh
- Jonathas de Andrade
- Minam Apang
- CAMP
- Julia Dault
- Abigail DeVille
- House of Natural Fiber
- Hu Xiaoyuan
- Invisible Borders
- Iman Issa
- Hassan Khan
- Lee Kit
- Cinthia Marcelle
- Bona Park
- Gary-Ross Pastrana
- Pratchaya Phinthong
- Amalia Pica
- Rita Ponce de León
- The Propeller Group
- Gabriel Sierra
- Rayyane Tabet
- Pilvi Takala
- Mariana Telleria
- Antonio Vega Macotela
- Adrián Villar Rojas
- El Payasito
- Ala Younis
- Masao Adachi
- Koji Wakamatsu
- Doa Aly
- Cevdet Erek
- Kamal Mufti
- Kemang Wa Lehulere

== 2015 ==
The third New Museum Triennial "Surround Audience" curated by Lauren Cornell and Ryan Trecartin was on view from February 25 until May 24, 2015.

- Nadim Abbas
- Lawrence Abu Hamdan
- niv Acosta
- Njideka Akunyili Crosby
- Sophia Al-Maria
- Ketuta Alexi-Meskhishvili
- Ed Atkins
- Olga Balema
- Frank Benson
- Sascha Braunig
- Antoine Catala
- Aslı Çavuşoğlu
- José León Cerrillo
- Onejoon Che
- Tania Pérez Córdova
- Verena Dengler
- DIS
- Aleksandra Domanović
- Casey Jane Ellison
- Exterritory
- Geumhyung Jeong
- Ane Graff
- Guan Xiao
- Shadi Habib Allah
- Eloise Hawser
- Lena Henke
- Lisa Holzer
- Juliana Huxtable
- Renaud Jerez
- K-HOLE
- Shreyas Karle
- Kiluanji Kia Henda
- Josh Kline
- Eva Kotátková
- Donna Kukama
- Firenze Lai
- Oliver Laric
- Li Lia
- Rachel Lord
- Basim Magd
- Nicholas Mangan
- Ashland Mines
- Shelly Nadashi
- Eduardo Navarro
- Steve Roggenbuck
- Avery K. Singer
- Daniel Steegmann Mangrané
- Martine Syms
- Lisa Tan
- Luke Willis Thompson
- Peter Wächtler

== 2018 ==
The fourth New Museum Triennial "Songs for Sabotage" curated by Gary Carrion-Murayari and Alex Gartenfeld was on view from February 13, 2018 until May 27, 2018.

- Cian Dayrit
- Violet Dennison
- Tomm El-Saieh
- Janiva Ellis
- Claudia Martínez Garay
- Haroon Gunn-Salie
- Matthew Angelo Harrison
- Tiril Hasselknippe
- Inhabitants with Margarida Mendes
- KERNEL (founded in 2009, Athens, Greece, by Pegy Zali, Petros Moris, and Theodoros Giannakis)
- Manolis D. Lemos
- Zhenya Machneva
- Chemu Ng’ok
- Gresham Tapiwa Nyaude
- Daniela Ortiz
- Lydia Ourahmane
- Hardeep Pandhal
- Dalton Paula
- Julia Phillips
- Song Ping
- Anupam Roy
- Manuel Solano
- Diamond Stingily
- Song Ta
- Wilmer Wilson IV
- Shen Xin

== 2021 ==
The fifth New Museum Triennial "Soft Water Hard Stone" curated by Margot Norton and Jamillah James was on view from 28 October, 2021 until January 23, 2022.

- Haig Aivazian
- Evgeny Antufiev
- Alex Ayed
- Nadia Belerique
- Hera Büyüktaşçıyan
- Gabriel Chaile
- Gaëlle Choisne
- Krista Clark
- Kate Cooper
- Cynthia Daignault
- Tomás Díaz Cedeño
- Jes Fan
- Jeneen Frei Njootli (Vuntut Gwitchin)
- Goutam Ghosh
- Harry Gould Harvey IV
- Clara Ianni
- Kahlil Robert Irving
- Arturo Kameya
- Laurie Kang
- Bronwyn Katz
- Ann Greene Kelly
- Kang Seung Lee
- Amy Lien and Enzo Camacho
- Angelika Loderer
- Tanya Lukin Linklater (Alutiiq)
- Sandra Mujinga
- Gabriela Mureb
- Brandon Ndife
- Erin Jane Nelson
- Ima-Abasi Okon
- Christina Pataialii
- Thao Nguyen Phan
- Nickola Pottinger
- Rose Salane
- Blair Saxon-Hill
- Samara Scott
- Amalie Smith
- Iris Touliatou
- Ambera Wellmann
- Yu Ji
