= Braunig =

Braunig is a German language surname. It stems from the male given name Bruno – and may refer to:

- Sascha Braunig (1983), Canadian painter
- Werner Bräunig (1934–1976), German author
