= Rummelplatz =

Novel by Werner Bräunig

Rummelplatz (Fairground) is a novel written by Werner Bräunig in the GDR between 1959 and 1966. The novel was first published posthumously in 2007. An English translation by Samuel P. Willcocks was published by Seagull Books in 2016.

The novel's plot centers on East Germany's early years. Set in the fictive town of Bermsthal in the Ore Mountains, it recounts the lives of miners in a uranium mine owned by the Soviet SAG Wismut. The novel ends with the June 17, 1953 uprising.

Bräunig drew on his own experiences as a miner in Wismut when writing the novel. At the 11th Plenum of the SED in 1965, Rummelplatz was criticized by party leadership, making it impossible for the work to published. The novel was first published posthumously in 2007 by the Aufbau Verlag and was nominated for the Leipzig Book Fair Prize in the same year.

== Editions ==
Werner Bräunig, Rummelplatz. Berlin: Aufbau Verlag, 2007. ISBN 978-3-351-03210-4.

== Translation ==
Werner Bräunig, Rummelplatz. London: Seagull Books, 2016. 978-0-857-42305-4.
