= Wismut (company) =

Mining company in East Germany

The Hammer and Schlegel logo of Wismut

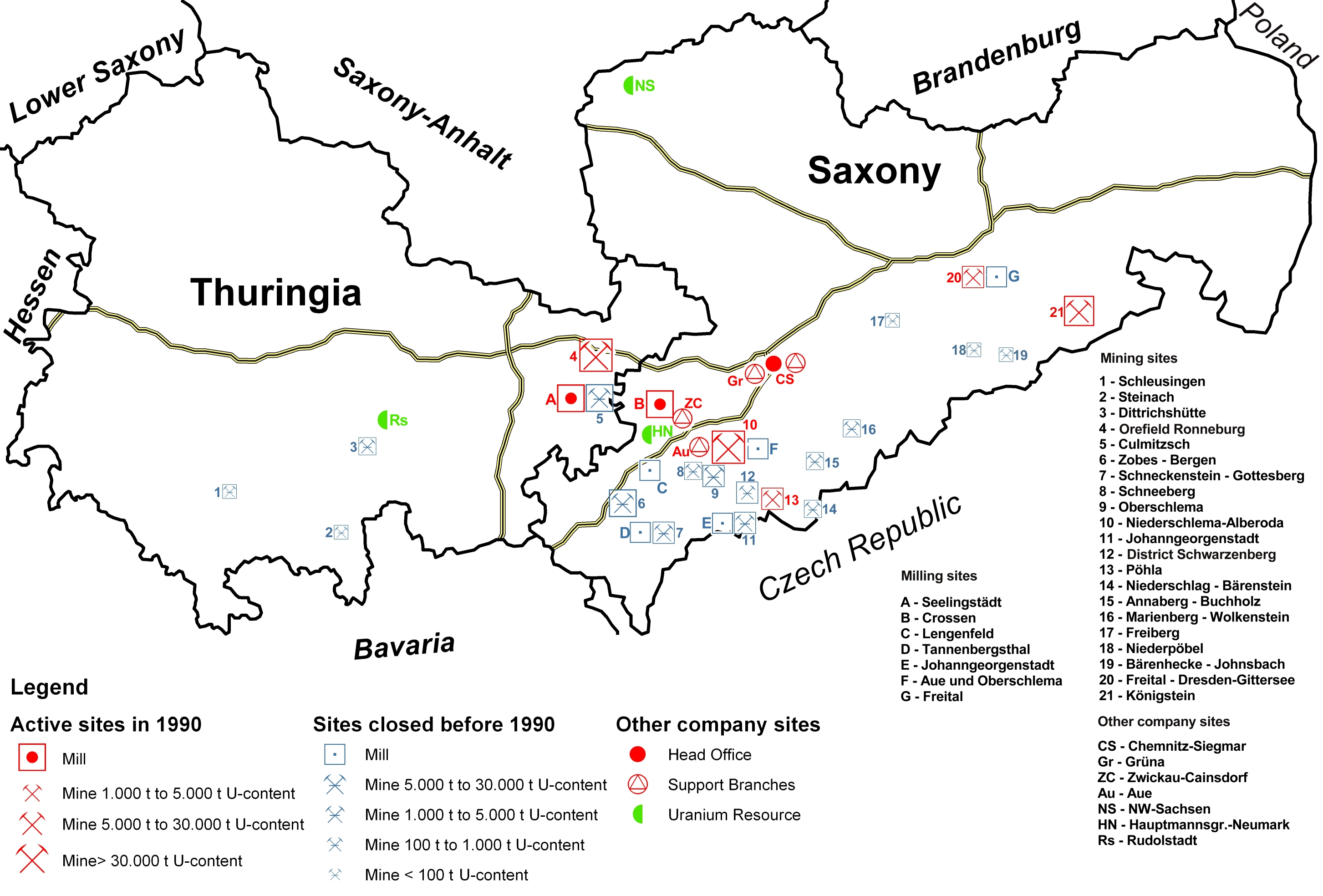
Locations of Wismut in Saxony and Thuringia

SAG/SDAG Wismut was a uranium mining company in East Germany during the time of the Cold War. It produced a total of 230,400 tonnes of uranium between 1947 and 1990 and made East Germany the fourth largest producer of uranium ore in the world at the time. It was the largest single producer of uranium ore in the entire sphere of control of the USSR. In 1991 after German reunification it was transformed into the Wismut GmbH company, owned by the Federal Republic of Germany, which is now responsible for the restoration and environmental cleanup of the former mining and milling areas. The head office of SDAG Wismut / Wismut GmbH is in Chemnitz-Siegmar.

== History ==
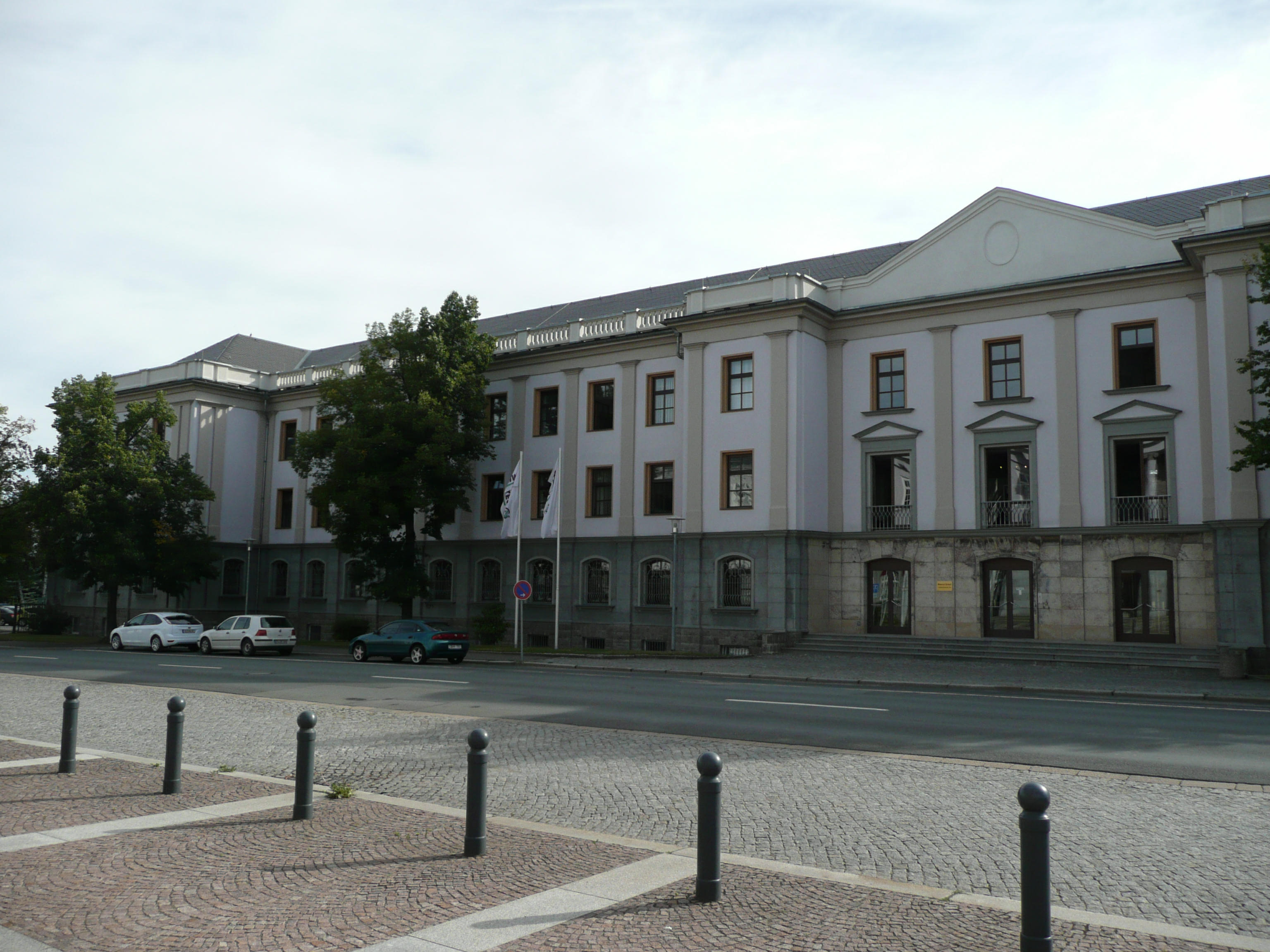
Head office of Wismut GmbH in Chemnitz-Siegmar

The Ore Mountains (German: Erzgebirge; Czech: Krušné hory) in southern East Germany at the border with the Czech Republic are closely connected to the history of uranium exploitation. The metal was discovered in a sample from a silver mine in the mountain range, and uranium was produced first as a by-product in the early 19th century and later as a main product from the 1890s on. The chemists Marie and Pierre Curie discovered the elements radium and polonium in pitchblende tailings from a Czech uranium mine in these mountains. Radioactive waters were used in several towns for health treatment.

The uranium mines in the Erzgebirge, in the south-eastern provinces of Thüringen and Sachsen were the sites of a number of NKVD mining camps employing forced labor. Wismut AG was the Soviet company that ran the uranium mines. Stalin gave greatest priority to this mining project in his competition with the United States to produce nuclear weapons. On April 4, 1946, the Council of Ministers of the Soviet Union decided to place the uranium mining under the control of the NKVD. Regular mining operation for uranium started in the summer of 1946. Lavrentii Beria, Soviet Minister of Internal Affairs, chief of the NKVD, who was directly responsible for the Soviet atom bomb project, appointed NKVD Major General Mikhail M. Maltsev, a veteran commander of GULAG labor camps in the USSR and recipient of the highest Soviet decorations, to lead this enterprise. He was under the direct command of Colonel General Ivan Serov, head of the NKVD/MVD in the Soviet Zone of Occupation and Beria's deputy.

Maltsev applied GULAG discipline methods in the early days of the Wismut operation, such as withdrawing food rations from miners who did not fulfill their quotas or the use of military tribunals for those workers accused of alleged sabotage. But unlike the GULAG forced labor camps in Siberia, it was difficult to hide the abuses of labor in the Erzgebirge, a fairly densely settled region of East Germany. To maintain secrecy and security, however, in early 1947, the mining districts became closed military zones, banning even the East German government party, SED, from activities there. Wismut, as it was under the political control of the NKVD, dealt with all important issues between the company and its German employees. The Soviet military employees in Wismut, on the other hand, were under the authority of the Ministry of State Security, Minister Viktor Abakumov, who had frequent conflicts with Serov.

The NKVD maintained a strict security system in the Wismut mines. NKVD/MVD troops guarded not only the mines, but the total Wismut zone of mines as well. having up to 15,000 troops there. These troops were under the command of the NKVD military head of Wismut. There were additional armed military units stationed in the uranium mining districts. Military and NKVD checkpoints were present at all approaches to this zone. The mines were surrounded by wooden fences and watch towers, and access to them was only through a guarded gate. There were also NKVD posts at district or town levels at the fourteen Wismut mines. A special NKVD group, commanded by a Major Malygin, was very important in its work at all the pits and plants of Wismut. He had the task of investigating all cases of espionage and diversion and reported directly to General Serov.

The uranium industry grew in the early years after the war at an extraordinary rate, reaching its highest number of employees in autumn 1950 with over 200,000 workers. Wismut AG became the largest enterprise in the Soviet Zone of Occupation. The initial program of compulsory labor was eventually supplanted by volunteer labor, responding to higher wages and better working and living conditions. Wismut health records indicate that at least 20,000 miners died of or suffered from lung disease "induced by exposure to radiation and dust".

At the end of 1953 the company was liquidated and the Soviet-East German stock company Wismut (SDAG Wismut) was newly founded, with the Soviet Union and the German Democratic Republic each owning 50%. Working and technological standards improved significantly in the following years. Uranium exploration and mining concentrated in the first years after World War II on the old mining areas of the Ore Mountains and adjacent Vogtland mountains. Many uranium occurrences had long been known there and were accessible using the old adits and shafts from the silver and base metal mining of former centuries. In 1950 the giant ore deposit of Ronneburg and the medium-sized Culmitzsch deposit (both in eastern Thuringia) were discovered and in 1965 the Königstein deposit in the Elbe Sandstone Mountains. The peak of uranium production by the Wismut company occurred from the mid-1960s to the early 1970s, reaching nearly 7,000 tonnes of uranium per year, after which it declined to 3,500 tonnes in the last normal production year, 1989.

Political and economic changes in East Germany and the subsequent reunification of Germany led to the cessation of uranium mining in December 1990. The Federal Republic of Germany assumed ownership of the East German and Soviet stocks of the company and transformed the company into Wismut GmbH in 1991. This new company is responsible for restoring the former mining and milling sites, for which the government approved a total budget of around 6.4 billion euro, but higher costs are anticipated. This activity includes securing/filling underground cavities, covering dumps and tailings, treating mine water and removal/decontamination of the buildings at the mine and milling sites. In 2011 the restoration program was extended to the year 2022.

== Mining ==
=== Ore Mountains and Vogtland ===
The Ore Mountains (German: Erzgebirge) and Vogtland were the first exploration targets for uranium and host the largest number of deposits mined by Wismut. All deposits in these mountain ranges are hydrothermal vein-style mineralisations in Palaeozoic metasedimentary and igneous rocks and Variscan age granites. Most deposits are situated in the western Ore Mountains and the neighbouring Vogtland region, whereas the central and eastern Ore Mountains contain only a few smaller deposits.

The deposits are related to deep crustal northwest-trending fault structures, with the most important being the Gera-Jáchymov fault zone containing most of the larger deposits, including Jáchymov on the Czech site of the Ore Mountains, Johanngeorgenstadt, Pöhla-Tellerhäuser, Schneeberg-Schlema-Alberoda in the German part of the Ore Mountains, and Ronneburg black shale-type mineralisation in Thuringia. The size of the mineralisations ranges from very small deposits with some hundred kilogrammes of uranium content and a few mineralised veins, up to the giant deposit of Schneeberg-Schlema-Alberoda containing nearly 100,000 tonnes of uranium and about 2,000 mineralised veins. There are three major vein types carrying uranium: uranium-quartz-calcite veins (270 million years old), dolomite-uranium veins (Triassic age) and BiCoNi-Ag-U veins (Tertiary age). Only the first type is a primary mineralisation, while the latter two carry remobilised pitchblende from the older vein types. The BiCoNi-Ag-U mineralisation had been mined since the 15th century for its content of silver, bismuth, cobalt and nickel. The heavy black mineral often occurring in these veins was useless to the miners of former times and was named 'Pechblende' (pitchblende) because of its color. This word is still used for the most important uranium mineral ore in all veins types, but coffinite deposits also occur. In the oxidation zones of the deposits there is a wide range of secondary uranium minerals. The distribution of uranium minerals in the veins varies considerably with the highest concentration of uranium in places where they crosscut reducing host lithologies like carbon-rich schist and skarn. The width of the veins ranges from a few centimeters to several meters, with an average ore grade of 0.1% of uranium. Lenses of massive pitchblende occur locally with a width of over 1 m. The most important deposits are described below.

==== Schneeberg-Schlema-Alberoda (Objects 02/03/09; mining division Aue) ====
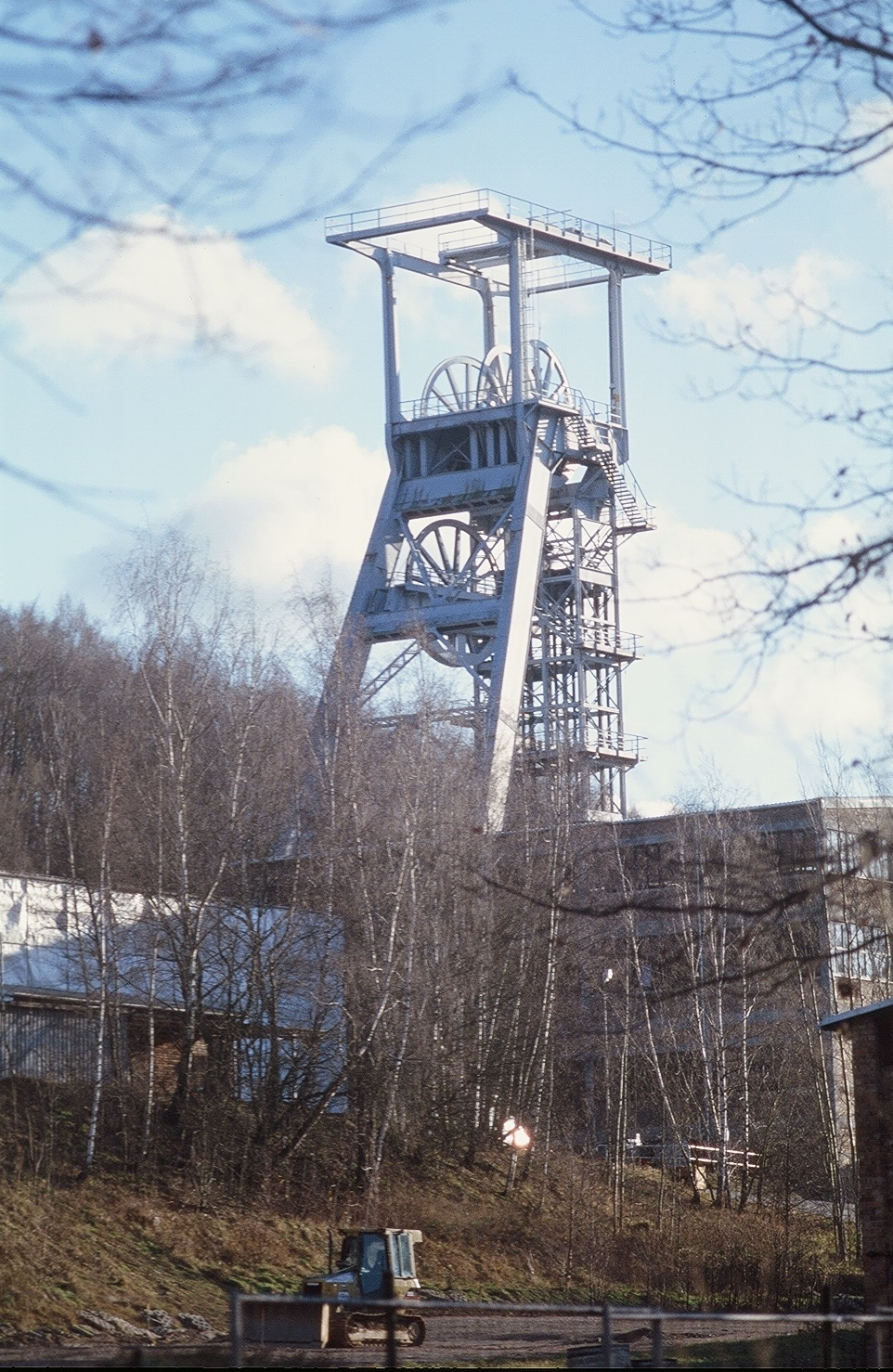
Shaft 371 in Hartenstein (Ore Mountains), former main shaft on the Niederschlema-Alberoda deposit

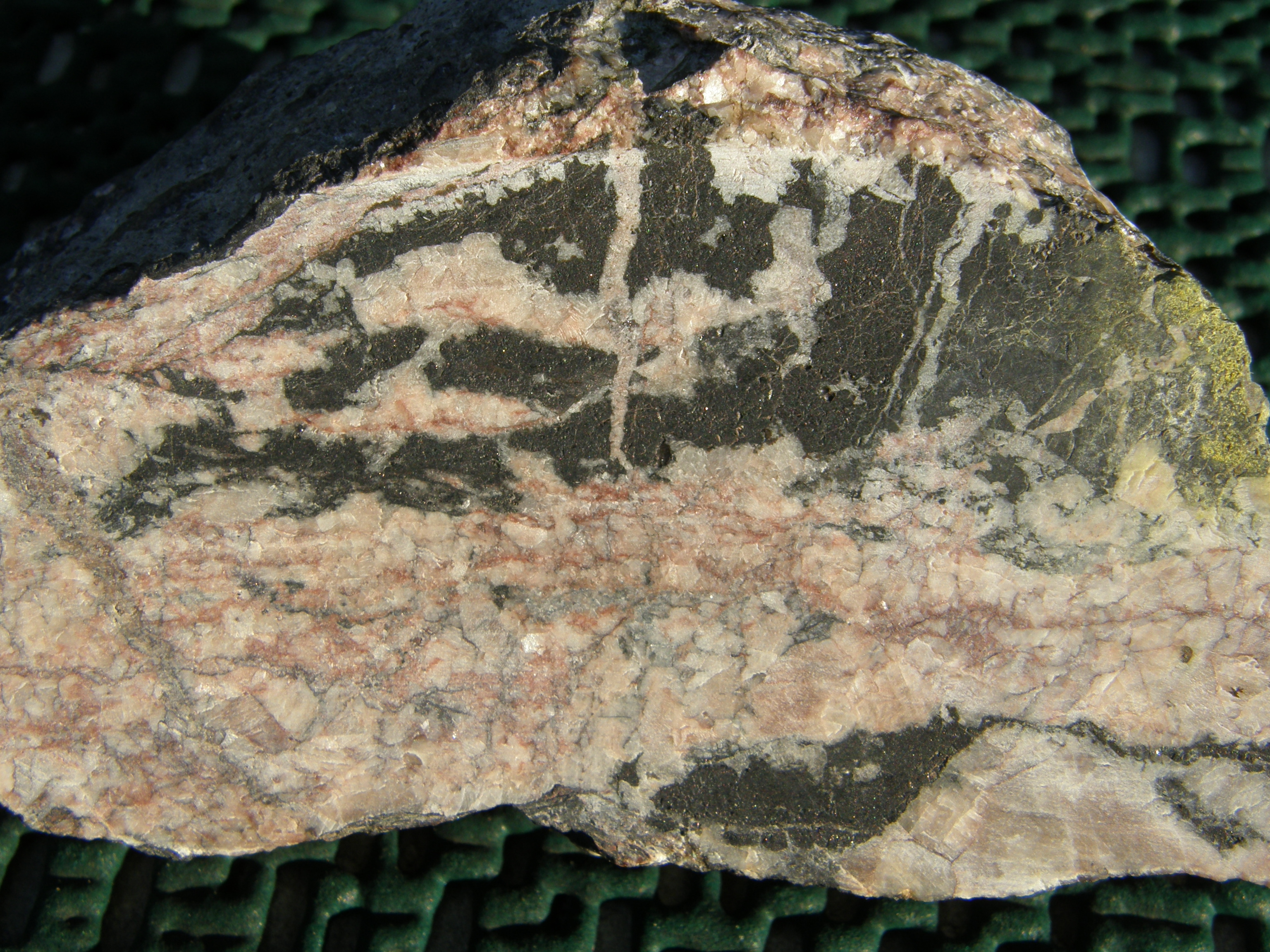
Uranium ore (pitchblende in dolomite) from the vein-type deposit Niederschlema-Alberoda

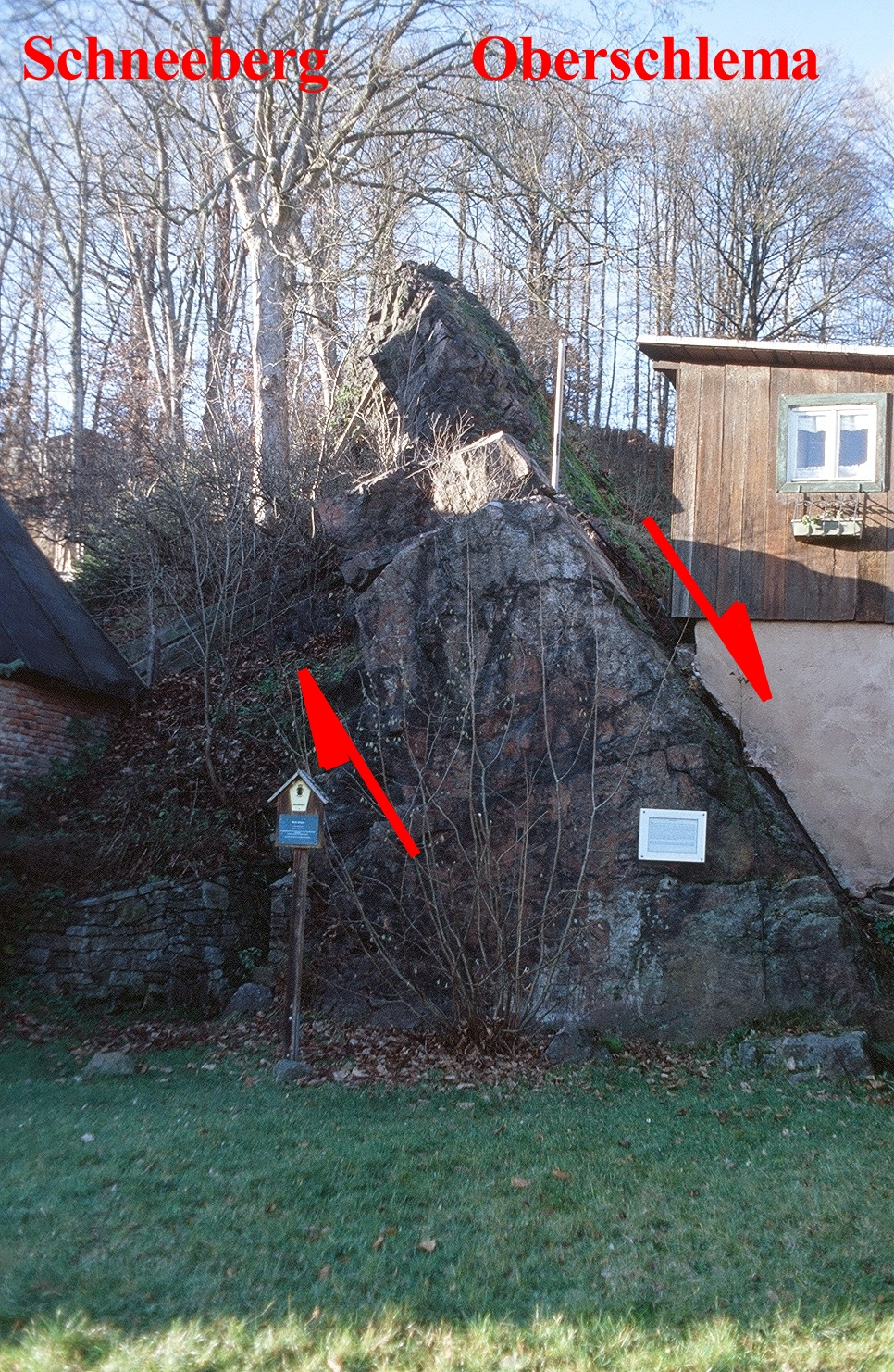
Roter Kamm fault in Bad Schlema: The hematite-quartz mineralised fault is the geological boundary between the Schneeberg and Schlema-Alberoda deposits.

This ore field was the largest deposit in the Ore Mountains. It is situated about 20 km south of Zwickau in the western Ore Mountains. Schneeberg was an important mining center since the 15th century, producing silver, cobalt, nickel and bismuth, and the town of Oberschlema was known for its strongest naturally occurring radioactive waters at the beginning of the 20th century. A radium health center was established in the town in 1914.

After the Second World War, Soviet scientists started exploring the old mining areas for uranium, and mining commenced in 1946 even before SAG Wismut was established in 1947. Schneeberg at the southern end of the deposit became Object 03 and Oberschlema Object 02. Subsequently, the blind (no mineralisation reaches the surface) northern part of the ore field (Niederschlema-Alberoda) was discovered and mining started there in 1949. Object 09 was established to mine the Niederschlema-Alberoda part of the ore field.

Mining in Schneeberg continued until 1954 reusing many shafts from previous silver and cobalt mining. Up to that time, about 200 tonnes of uranium was extracted from Schneeberg. Oberschlema was mined to depths of over 700 m. Mining ceased in 1960 after producing more than 7,000 tonnes of uranium. A high density of veins near the surface and the 'wild' mining methods of the 1940s and 1950s caused the complete destruction of Oberschlema. Most houses were so badly damaged and the subsurface so unstable that the entire small town was removed in the 1950s. Today the former mining area hosts a radon health center reestablished in the 1990s. After a restructure of the company in the 1960s, Object 09 became Bergbaubetrieb Aue (mining division Aue). It developed into the single largest producer of uranium within SAG/SDAG Wismut with a peak production of 4,000 tonnes of uranium in 1965. In the last normal production year, 1989, it produced about 550 tonnes. This deposit was the first of all Wismut deposits to be supplied with large modern mining shafts and powerful ventilation in the mid-1950s . The most important shafts where Shaft 38 (Niederschlema), Shaft 366 (Aue-Alberoda) and Shaft 371 (Hartenstein). The latter went into production in 1959 and was the main shaft of the deposit up to the end of production in 1990. Shaft 371 possessed an automated sorting plant used to separate different classes of ore and to increase the overall ore grade. High grade ore was sent directly to the Soviet Union without further processing, while ore containing less than 1% uranium was shipped to the mill at Crossen near Zwickau. This was done until 1980; afterwards all ore was milled, with the sorting plant raising the average ore grade to 0.4% before it was sent to Crossen for processing. An unsuccessful attempt was also made to produce base metals, silver and selenium as by-products. Shaft 371 was connected to the -540 and -990 m level (the depth is related to the Markus Semmler adit dewatering the upper part of the deposit into the Zwickauer Mulde river). Deeper levels were connected by blind shafts. The deepest level opened in 1988 was the -1800 m level, nearly 2,000 m underground, making the mine the deepest in Europe. The mining method used was the same as in the centuries before, although with more modern equipment: galleries were driven along strike of the mineralised vein on a lower and upper level (vertical distance 30 to 45 m). These were connected by small shafts from the lower to the upper level. Then the vein was mined upward using drilling and blasting. The ore was transported to the lower level and brought to the main shafts by rail cars, while the stope was filled with waste rock, as possible. After a vein was mined out, the entrances were sealed to prevent radon from the old stopes from entering areas with active mining. This method was used in all vein type deposits of the Ore Mountains. The total production from Niederschlema-Alberoda was over 72,000 tonnes of uranium. Together with the production from Schneeberg and Oberschlema, production losses and unmined resources, the total uranium content was about 96,000 tonnes of uranium, making Schneeberg-Schlema-Alberoda the largest vein-style uranium deposit in the world.

After the political changes production slowed down in 1990 and eventually stopped on 31 December 1990. Together with the closure of the uranium mine at Pöhla and the tin mines at Altenberg and Ehrenfriedersdorf this ended the 800-year-old history of metal mining in the Ore Mountains. After the end of production, the newly formed Wismut GmbH as successor of SDAG Wismut started restoration of the area. Flooding of the mine started in 1991 and in 1997 the water reached the -540 m level as the uppermost level of shaft 371. At this point, the mine was opened for the public as the deepest tourist mine in Europe. A water treatment plant was erected with a final capacity of 1,300 m^{3} per hour, removing uranium, radium, arsenic and iron from the contaminated mine water before releasing it into the Zwickauer Mulde river. Underground work, especially in Oberschlema, is being carried out to secure near-surface galleries and shafts from collapse and to provide safe airways for radon-containing mine air to prevent it from uncontrolled movement into populated areas of the region. The huge waste rock dumps were either relocated or recontoured and covered with 80 cm of clay and 20 cm of top soil. In 2008, most of the underground work was finished and nearly all shafts were sealed. Most dumps are poorly restored. Shaft 382 with a depth of 1,400 m will stay open (although it is flooded) and provide a controlled path for radon-bearing air to escape from the mine. There is still some uranium being won as a consequence of the restoration program; it is being purchased by the US with long-term contracts.

Like most deposits in the western Ore Mountains, the Schneeberg-Schlema-Alberoda deposit is situated on the Gera-Jachymov fault zone. This major geological structure with a length of several hundred kilometres strikes NW-SE, running from the central Bohemian Massif in the Czech Republic to central Germany. The main element of this fault zone in the Ore Mountains is the Roter Kamm ('Red Ridge') fault carrying a young quartz-hematite mineralisation, but no uranium. This fault forms the boundary between the Schneeberg and Oberschlema deposits, having a vertical displacement of about 400 m. The second controlling element for the deposit are Variscan granites, which underlie the deposit. The mineralised veins are within the exocontact of the granite, although the oldest uranium mineralisation is about 20 Ma younger than those granites. The third controlling factor is a heavily deformed unit of Ordovician to Silurian meta-sedimentary rocks. This so-called Loessnitz-Zwoenitz-Trough runs east–west, broadening toward the east. This rock unit is formed by quartzites, meta-black shales, amphibolites and skarns. It is contained within phyllites, which form the major rock type in this area of the Ore Mountains. The rocks of the Loessnitz-Zwoenitz-Trough are called the 'productive series', because they carry nearly all of the mineralisation. Although the vein structures can be followed from the productive series into the phyllites and granites, no significant mineralisation has been observed outside of it. The ore field contains about 1,800 mineralised veins. Uranium-bearing veins run approximately northwest to southeast, parallel to the Roter Kamm fault.

The oldest type of mineralisation consists of quartz, calcite, fluorite, pitchblende and minor hematite. The age of this primary mineralisation is about 270 Ma and it was the most important type in Oberschlema. About 100 Ma later a second uranium mineralisation formed. Veins of this type contain dolomite, calcite, pitchblende, minor sulphides and selenides (especially clausthalite). This mineralisation event did not bring new uranium into the deposit but remobilised uranium from the older mineralisation. These dolomite-uranium veins were the major uranium formation in Niederschlema-Alberoda. A third uranium-bearing vein type contains quartz, calcite, Co- and Ni-arsenides, native bismuth, silver and pitchblende. Like the dolomite veins, there was no input of new uranium but only remobilisation. These were the most important veins in Schneeberg, not only for uranium but also for Ag and Co-Ni production. Telescoping is also a common feature with different types of mineralisation being found stuck together in the same part of the vein.

Beside the uranium-bearing mineralisation types, there are about one dozen different styles of other mineralisation ranging from Sn-W, Pb-Zn, fluorite-barite to quartz-hematite. They had no economic importance but contributed to the large variety of the several hundred minerals known from the deposit. Especially in the oxidation zones of Schneeberg and Oberschlema, many rare secondary minerals are found, with many of them being newly discovered there. For example, in samples from a single ore shot in Schneeberg five new uranium minerals were discovered in 1871, namely walpurgite, zeunerite, troegerite, uranospinite and uranosphaerite.

==== Zobes and Bergen (Object 06) ====
Zobes is a small village in the Vogtland mountains. Between 1949 and 1961 the second largest vein-type deposit of the Wismut company was mined there. The geology is very similar to that of Schneeberg-Schlema-Alberoda with similar types of veins and host rocks. But the size is much smaller, the total uranium content is roughly 5,000 tonnes. Unlike most other deposits in the Ore Mountains and Vogtland region, there was no historical mining preceding the activities of Wismut. Because of the smaller size of the deposit and the relative low population mining did not impact the area as it did at other deposits mined by Wismut. Only the dump of shaft 362 is left today, others have been removed as construction material and low grade ore. The small uranium deposit Bergen was mined only few kilometers away and was connected underground to the Zobes mines. While the Zobes deposit was in meta-sedimentary rocks, Bergen was an intragranitic deposit. It was recognised worldwide for its excellent and large crystals of secondary uranium minerals like uranocircite. There is also a mineral named after the deposit: bergenite. A part of the Bergen deposit was later mined for granite as construction material in a large open cut.

==== Johanngeorgenstadt (Object 01) ====
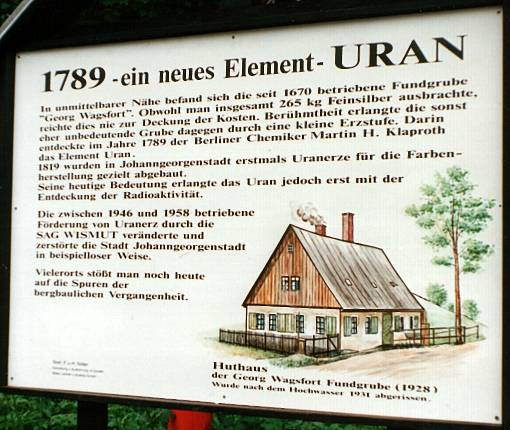
Sign near former Georg Wagsforth mine, from where the pitchblende specimen originates in which uranium was discovered

Johanngeorgenstadt is situated in the westernmost part of the Ore Mountains directly on the border to the Czech Republic and on the boundary between the Vogtland and Ore Mountains. It is famous because in 1789, the chemist M.H. Klaproth discovered the element uranium in a sample from the town's Georg Wagsforth silver mine. About 160 years later, the town became Wismut's Object 01 and the old town center was completely destroyed because of intense near-surface underground mining for uranium. Of the old town center, only the church survived this part of town history while all other houses had to be removed because of severe damage. Mining took place from 1946 to 1958 and about 3,500 tonnes of uranium were extracted. The deposit extended over the border into Czechoslovakia. While the Czechoslovak uranium company carried out own exploration and mining on its site of the deposit, one vein was mined by Wismut under Czech territory under contract between the East German and Czechoslovak governments.

The deposit is situated on the western edge of the Gera-Jachymov fault zone. It is located in the exocontact of the Eibenstock granite underlying the deposit. The granite itself carries only minor U-Bi veins; most mineralisation is contained in veins in micaschist. Major mineralisation styles are quartz-carbonate-pitchblende and quartz-calcite-arsenide-Ag-pitchblende veins.

The Wismut GmbH is not responsible for recultivating mining areas which did not belong to the company in 1991 when it was formed out of the SDAG Wismut and there are no funds included in the initial 6.4 billion euro budget for cleaning up those areas. Because most of the smaller deposits in the Ore Mountains and Vogtland were mined out in the 1950s and 1960s and the old mining sites were transferred to the local authorities after mining stopped, there were no plans of Wismut GmbH to recultivate the areas in their original restoration program. However, after negotiations between the state of Saxony, the German federal government and Wismut GmbH contracts were made and funds were provided to restore these old areas, including Johanngeorgenstadt. In this town activities of Wismut GmbH include mainly contouring, relocation and covering of dumps, and securing hazardous underground mining areas.

==== Pöhla (mining division Aue) ====
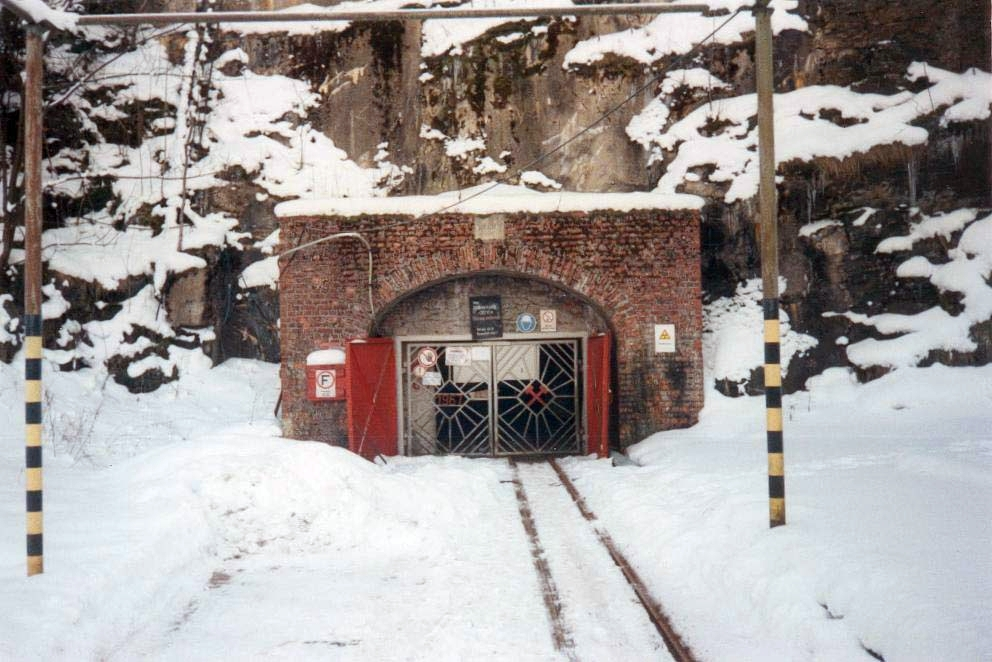
The main adit of the former Pöhla uranium mine, today a visitor mine

Pöhla is a small village in the western Ore Mountains at the base of the Fichtelberg, the highest mountain in eastern Germany. Mining in the area started centuries ago but mining activity remained minor in the area until after World War II. Wismut started exploration in the 1940s and mined small mineralisations in the area containing a few tonnes of uranium. A shaft was sunk at Pöhla-Globenstein but found only very little uranium mineralisation. However, a magnetite-skarn mineralisation was discovered and shaft ownership was transferred to an east German iron company for exploration purposes. During exploration in the 1960s, drillings showed radioactive anomalies in areas named Hämmerlein and Tellerhäuser south of Pöhla. It was decided to explore these deposits underground using an adit, which was started in 1967. The portal of the adit was in a valley outside Pöhla. At about 3 km the adit cut the mineralisation at Hämmerlein. It showed that there was just a minor uranium mineralisation there, which was mined out during exploration phase resulting in a production of 15 tonnes of uranium. However, significant tin mineralisation was discovered in skarns and schists. Further, the skarns also contained zinc, magnetite, indium and cadmium. This mineralisation was intensively explored during the 1970s and studies were made to set up a major tin mine. However, although resources were high and ore grades were better than in the producing tin mines in East Germany at that time, the mineralogy was very complex, preventing the usage of proven milling technologies. Wismut developed a special milling technology for the complex tin ore but it proved to be too expensive and the project was stopped.

From Hämmerlein, the main adit was driven further during the 1970s to investigate the mineralisation at Tellerhäuser, which was cut at about 7.5 km adit length. This uranium mineralisation was much larger than at Hämmerlein and two blind shaft were sunk to deeper parts of the deposits. Mining started in 1983 and 1,200 tonnes of uranium were produced until the end of production in 1990. Like Hämmerlein, Tellerhäuser also showed a significant tin mineralisation in skarns as well as magnetite. Some of the magnetite was mined as an additive to concrete for nuclear power plants constructed by the East German government in the 1980s. Small amounts of silver were also extracted, but high arsenic contents of the silver ore made processing very expensive and production of silver was stopped in the late 1980s. An ore shoot with massive native arsenic and silver was made in 1990 shortly before the end of uranium mining. Some tons of the material were mined, but no processing was done.

The positive results regarding base metals at Hämmerlein and Tellerhäuser led to a reinvestigation of tin, tungsten and further resources at Globenstein and significant mineralisation was discovered in the 1980s. But like Hämmerlein, the complex mineralogy prevented further projects so far.

After production ceased, the area was recultivated, including flooding the mine, removing the mine buildings and covering the waste rock area. A water treatment plant was set up to remove uranium, radium and arsenic from the mine water. Because of the low water flow from the mine, it was possible to replace the initial active chemical water treatment plant with a passive biological unit (wetland). The adit is still open to the Hämmerlein part of the deposit and is operated by a private society as a visitor's mine. Wisutec GmbH, a daughter company of the Wismut GmbH, holds the exploration license for the Pöhla-Globenstein area at the moment (2013).

==== Schneckenstein and Gottesberg (Object 06) ====
These two deposits in the Vogtland mountains were operated by Object 06 of SAG/SDAG Wismut. Mining for tin and silver had a long tradition in the area, as did the production of gem-quality topaz. When Wismut started exploration and mining in the area there was still active mining for tin. Before Wismut discovered the nearby uranium mineralisations, it had already taken over the processing plant from the tin mine Tannenbergsthal on top of the Schneckenstein mountain in 1948. It investigated the tin mine itself but no uranium mineralisation was found. However, about 2 km from the tin mine the company discovered a uranium mineralisation which was mined from 1950 to 1960, producing about 1,000 tonnes of uranium. After uranium resources were depleted the mine was transferred to another mining company that started mining barite on a fault zone parallel to the uranium veins. Tin mining ceased in 1964 and barite mining in 1991. On the other side of the valley further uranium mineralisations were discovered and named Gottesberg. In contrast to the Schneckenstein mineralisation, which is hosted by metasedimentary rocks, veins at the little Gottesberg deposit are within granites. The small deposit was mined for a few years in the 1950s, producing about 70 tonnes of uranium. The Gottesberg area also hosted tin mines and is today under exploration license by a private German exploration company.

==== Schwarzenberg (Object 08) ====
Object 08 mined a dozen small deposits around Schwarzenberg in the western Ore Mountains between Aue and Johanngeorgenstadt. The largest deposit is the 'Weißer Hirsch' mine (Shaft 235) in Antonsthal, which produced about 700 tonnes of uranium until 1959. The other deposits yielded between 2 and 230 tonnes of uranium, resulting in a total local production of 1,100 tonnes. The dump material of the 'Weißer Hirsch' mine is currently being recycled as construction material.

==== Further deposits in the Ore mountains ====
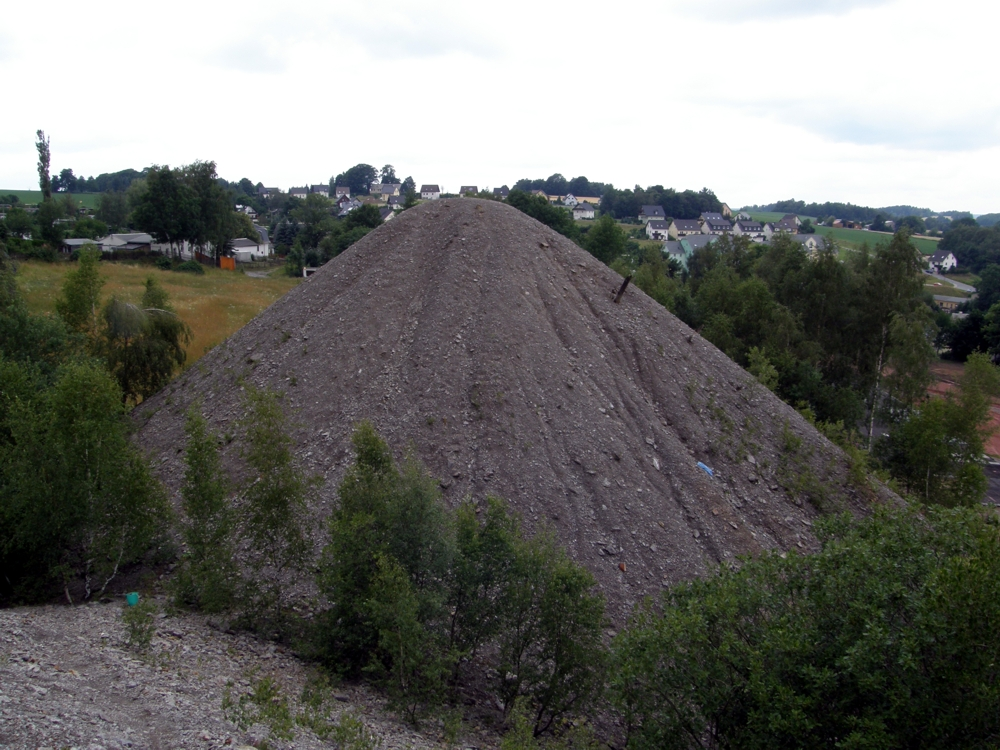
Dump of shaft 116, one of the most important uranium mines in Annaberg-Buchholz

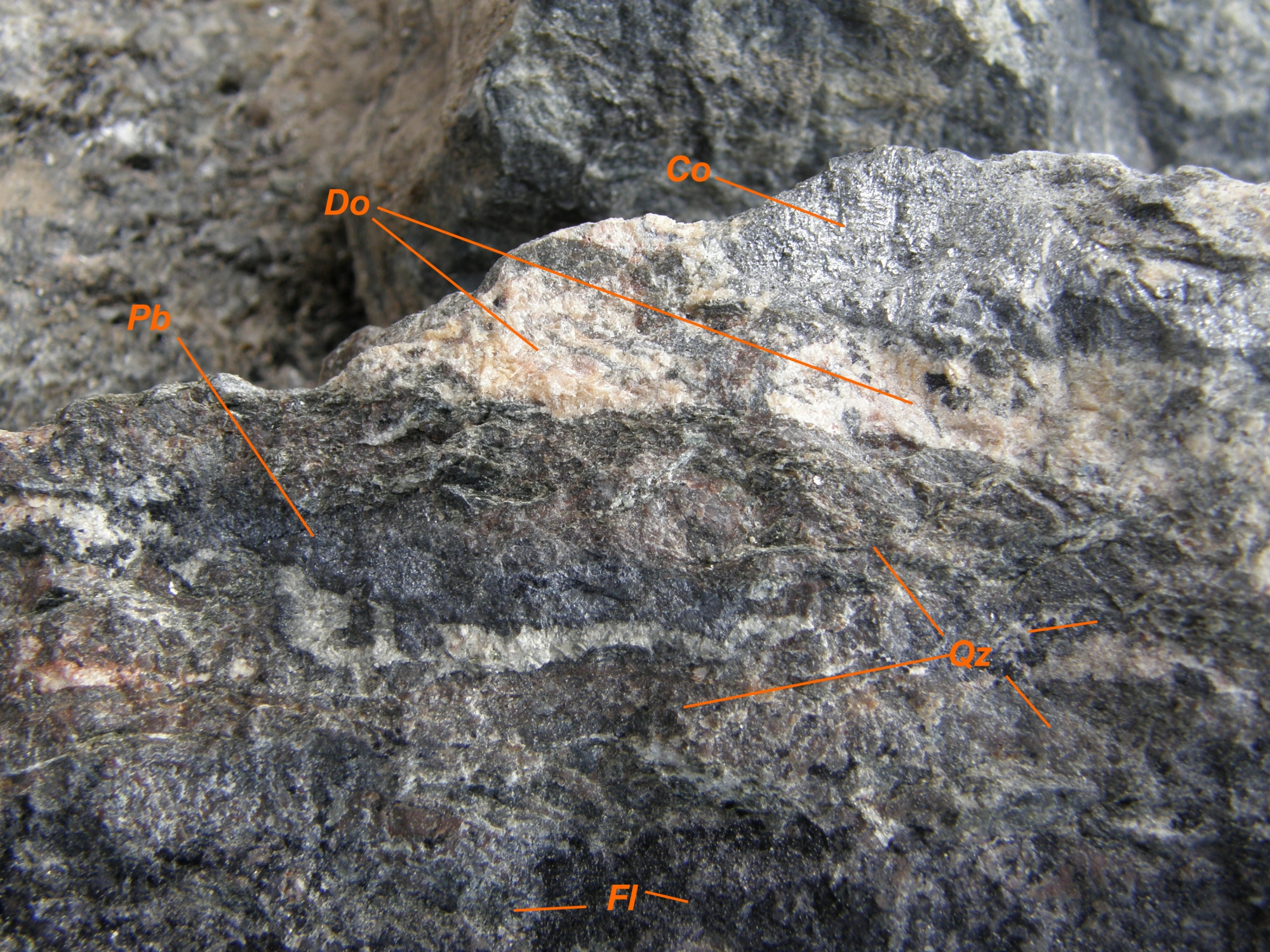
Uranium-Cobalt ore from shaft 139 in Marienberg

Annaberg-Buchholz in the central Ore Mountains is one of the famous historical silver mining towns of the Ore Mountains. Uranium mining by SAG Wismut commenced in 1947 and took place until 1958. About 450 tonnes of uranium were produced.

The Niederschlag-Bärenstein deposit is situated in the central Ore Mountains close to the border to the Czech Republic. There was an unsuccessful attempt to open a uranium mine in the 1930s. Uranium mining by SAG Wismut started in 1947 and ended in 1954, producing about 140 tonnes of uranium. The vein containing most of the mineralisation contains a fluorite-barite mineralisation below the uranium mineralised parts. A private company wanted to start mining this mineralisation in 2010.

Marienberg is also an old silver mining town founded in the 16th century in the central Ore Mountains. Wismut mined about 120 tonnes of uranium between 1947 and 1954. A large resource of fluorite is left. A shaft from the uranium mining era today provides thermal water for heating purposes.

The eastern Ore Mountains host only very small uranium mineralisation which produced only 50 tonnes in total. Mining took place at Bärenhecke, Niederpöbel, Johnsbach and Freiberg. The latter was the historically most important deposit of the Ore Mountains, and had produced silver since the 12th century. However, it contributed only very little to the uranium production of SAG Wismut. The deposit, which produced at least 6,000 tonnes of silver, contained just 5 tonnes of mineable uranium.

=== Thuringia ===
Eastern Thuringia developed in the 1950s into one of the major mining centers of Wismut, hosting the giant ore field of Ronneburg and the medium-sized deposit of Culmitzsch. Although the mineralisation at Ronneburg is hosted by the Gera-Jáchymov fault and it is likely its formation is linked to the vein-style deposits in the Ore Mountains sitting on the same structure, it is a completely different kind of mineralisation. This led to many problems in the first decade of mining.

==== Ronneburg (Object 90) ====
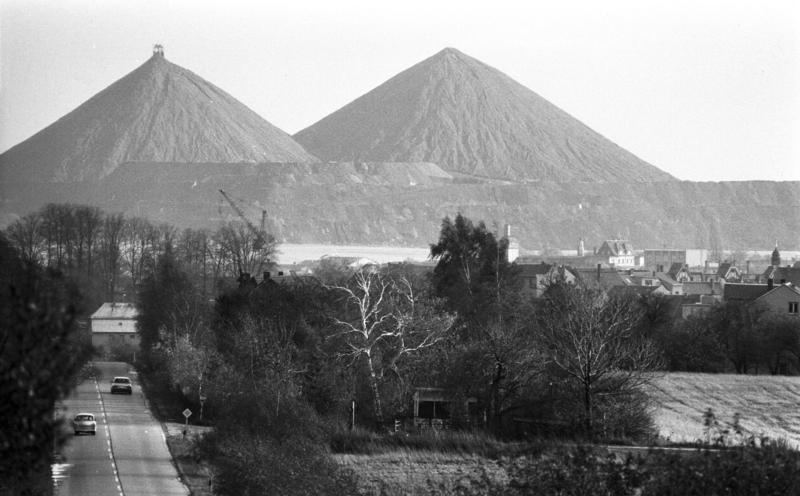
Waste rock dump at Ronneburg in 1990

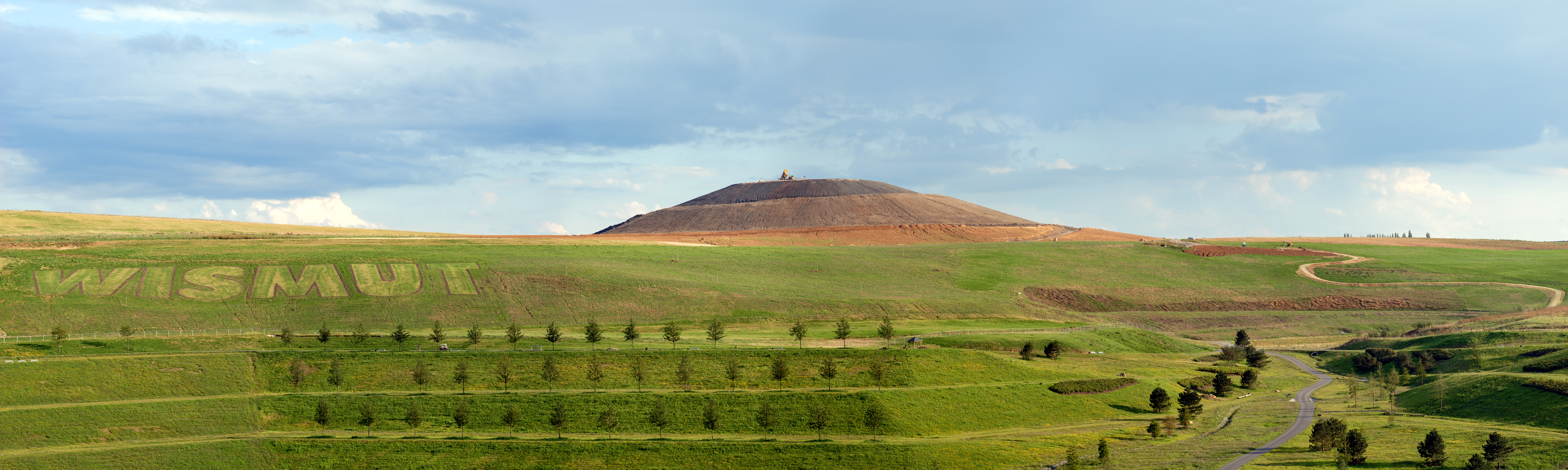
Recultivated mining area at Ronneburg

Ronneburg is a small town close to the BAB 4 Autobahn. It is situated about 10 km east of the next major city Gera. Ronneburg hosted a small radon spring, but it was not as famous as those in the Ore Mountains. Exploration in the area started in 1949, and the first shafts were sunk in 1950. The deposit was operated by Object 90 with its head office in Gera. During the 1950s exploration work at Ronneburg contributed the most uranium to the resource base of Wismut, showing the significance of the newly discovered deposit. However, there were many difficulties with mining of the deposit because that particular style of mineralisation was unknown to the East German and Soviet mining experts.

The mineralisation is hosted by Palaeozoic meta-black shales and Meta-basalts. Uranium mineralisation occurs in irregular shaped bodies of highly variable size and uranium content (in average 70 tonnes of uranium per body). The uranium minerals (mainly pitchblende) occur as impregnations, thin veinlets or in breccia zones in these bodies. The deposit was formed by remobilisation of uranium already enriched in the black shales by synsedimentary processes. Remobilisation was caused by hydrothermal and supergene processes leading to the further enrichment of uranium. The background uranium content in the black shales is 40 to 60 ppm. Like the major vein-style uranium deposits in the western Ore Mountains, the Ronneburg deposit is located on the Gera-Jachymov fault zone, which is called the Crimmitschau fault zone in this particular area.

The black shales also contain high amounts of sulfides (marcasite, pyrite) and carbon. Wismut tested several different methods to mine this deposit in the 1950s and 1960s. Some seemed to work, but during the 1950s many fires started in the mines. Sabotage was first considered as the cause, but the increasing number of fires showed that there must be another reason, which was found in the sulphur and carbon content of the black shales in combination with wrong mining methods. The initial mining methods led to many fractures in the rocks, which allowed oxygen to enter the rock. The resulting oxidation of sulfides produced enough heat to spontaneously start fires in the carbon-rich material. These fires became such a major problem that whole parts of the underground area had to be sealed off and production was heavily impacted. This also led to the decision to mine part of the deposit using an open pit, which seriously affected the Ronneburg area. However, in the 1960s special mining technology was developed involving backfilling of the stopes using drillings from the surface. Since then, underground fires have not been a major problem.

In the late 1960s the company was restructured and Object 90 was split up into several mining division: Bergbaubetrieb (mining division) Schmirchau (underground), Bergbaubetrieb Paitzdorf (underground), Bergbaubetrieb Reust (underground) and Bergbaubetrieb Lichtenberg (open pit). Open pit mining ended in 1976 when the pit reached a final depth of 300 m. Exploration for new areas of mineralisation led to the formation of two further mining divisions at the northern part of the deposit in 1974 (Bergbaubetrieb Beerwalde) and 1982 (Bergbaubetrieb Drosen). The mineralisation dips downward in a northern direction which resulted in deeper mining depths. The shafts of the northernmost mine Drosen reached nearly 900 m.

The grade of the ore mined was 0.08% uranium on average with a cut-off of 0.02% uranium. However, restricted zones of high grade mineralisation with more than 1% uranium occurred. An ore treatment plant was tested in Schmirchau to increase the grade before shipping to the mills, but this proved not to be effective. Most of the ore was sent without further treatment to the mills at Seelingstädt and Crossen. Small amounts of uranium were also produced by underground in-situ leaching and heap leaching of low grade ore and even waste rock. The mined resources of the ore field were 113,000 tonnes of uranium, of which about 100,000 tonnes were produced (the difference are production losses). The total resource of the deposit is about 200,000 tonnes of uranium (mined and unmined reserves as well as inferred and speculative resources).

After production ceased in 1990 recultivation work began. The mine dumps were the largest task in this mining area. It was decided to relocate most of the dump material of the southern mining divisions (Schmirchau, Reust, Paitzdorf, Lichtenberg) into the open pit Lichtenberg and to relocate those of the Korbußen mine (part of the Beerwalde mining division) and Drosen to the major dump at Beerwalde. To accomplish this task, Wismut GmbH ordered and operated the largest fleet of Caterpillar mine trucks in Europe. After relocation was finished, the dumps were covered. The southern mining area with the refilled Lichtenberg open pit was part of the 2007 federal garden exhibition Gera-Ronneburg.

==== Culmitzsch (Object 90) ====
The Culmitzsch deposit is about 15 km south of Ronneburg. It also belonged to Object 90 in Gera. However, it had a totally different geology than the Ronneburg ore field. Culmitzsch is a sedimentary deposit in Permian sandstone, siltstone and limestone. There are two ore horizons containing disseminated pitchblende and coffinite. An interesting feature is pseudomorphosis of uranium minerals after wood. Specimens still show the cell structure of the wood but are made of pitchblende. The deposit was mined from 1950 to 1967 in three open pits named Culmitzsch, Trünzig and Sorge-Katzendorf. The average ore grade was 0.06% and total production from the three pits was about 11,000 tonnes of uranium. The deposit extends further north from the mined area. This part of the deposit, called Gera-Süd, was explored underground, but difficult geotechnical conditions prevented the mining of this resource. The Culmitzsch and Trünzig open pits were used as tailings management facilities after they were mined out by the Seelingstädt mill, which was established in 1961 near the deposit.

==== Further deposits in Thuringia ====
In the southern part of Thuringia called the Thuringian Forest, mining of three small uranium deposits was undertaken in the 1950s. The largest deposit was Dittrichshütte and was mined underground with several small shafts producing about 112 tonnes of uranium from a black-shale-type mineralisation. Steinach was also a small black-shale-type deposit, mined in a small open cut producing about 40 tonnes of uranium. The Schleusingen mineralisation was hosted by Triassic sandstones and was mined underground, producing 14 tonnes of uranium.

=== Königstein (Königstein mining division) ===
Königstein is situated about 40 km southeast of Dresden in the Elbe Sandstone Mountains. Königstein castle is one of the major attractions in this touristic area. Exploration for uranium started in the early 1960s for sandstone hosted uranium mineralisation similar to the ones discovered further south in the Czech Republic. Finally a major mineralisation was discovered in 1963, hosted by Cretaceous sandstones with disseminated uranium minerals in Rollfront-type ore bodies. However, there are also small veins containing barite and pitchblende and the nature of this deposit is under discussion. Most likely it is a combination of a sedimentary style and hydrothermal mineralisation. Construction of the mine started immediately after the discovery and two main shaft along with several ventilation shafts were sunk to depths up to 300 m. Mining started in 1967 and it developed into one of the main producers of SDAG Wismut in the 1970s, with more than 1,000 tonnes of uranium per year in this decade. The ore mined was transported by a cable way down to the Elbe river valley from where it was transported by rail to the mill at Seelingstädt. Besides conventional mining using drilling, blasting and transport of the ore to the mill, already in 1969 studies were started on unconventional production methods for low grade ore using leaching. The low permeability of the sandstone prevented usual in-situ leaching from drillings. Therefore, different methods were developed to blast the ore underground, seal the blasted blocks, and press sulphuric acid into them. Heap leaching was also carried out as well as uranium extraction from mine water before it was released into the Elbe River. In 1984 conventional ore production ceased and only unconventional methods were used from that year on. Production sunk to about 450 tonnes uranium per year, but the Königstein mining division produced at the lowest costs of all Wismut mining divisions. The uranium bearing solution from leaching was transported by rail to the Seelingstädt mill where the final concentrate was produced. Total production of uranium until 1990 was about 18,000 tonnes, with 12,250 tonnes by conventional mining and 5,750 tonnes by unconventional methods.

In 1990 production ceased, as in the other mining divisions. However, the hydrogeological situation was difficult because of the high amount of uranium-bearing solution in the sandstone units hosting the mineralisation. Above that unit there are three aquifers supplying water to the cities of Pirna and Dresden. Therefore, large amounts of water had to be treated before the mine could finally be flooded. The uranium extracted in this cleaning process was sold to an American company in solution form. The total production of uranium from the mine water treatment between 1991 and 2008 can be estimated to be 1,000 t.

=== Freital / Dresden-Gittersee ('Willi Agatz' mining division) ===
This mining area covers parts of the cities Dresden (part Gittersee) and Freital. Mining for hard coal in the area is known to date from the 16th century. In 1949 Wismut studied radioactive anomalies in parts of the coal field and took over some mines. Mine ownership alternated several times between Wismut and the local hard coal mining company. In the early 1950s, when the coal field belonged to the hard coal mining company, two new main shafts in Dresden-Gittersee were sunk to depths of about 700 m and the mine was renamed 'Willi Agatz', after a leader of the East German communist party. In 1968 production of coal for energy production was eventually stopped and the mine was transferred a last time to SDAG Wismut. From that time on coal was only mined for its uranium content. The deposit was depleted in 1989 after producing about 3,700 tonnes of uranium since 1949 and 40 million tonnes of hard coal since the 16th century. It was the last Saxonian hard coal mine to be shut down. The uranium-bearing coal was milled at small local plants in Freital when Wismut first was active in the area in the 1950s. After 1968 the coal was milled at Crossen.

Restoration of the area after 1991 was carried out by the Königstein division of Wismut GmbH. The deposit is connected by a several kilometer long adit to the Elbe River in Dresden. This adit was built in the 19th century to ship coal directly from the underground part of the mines to the river, although it was never used for this purpose. However, the adit had to be refurbished by Wismut GmbH as one of the major tasks at the deposit in order to provide for secure dewatering of the mining area. Furthermore, the dumps had to be covered, including ash dumps from the firing of uranium-bearing coal in former times.

Seven coal seams are present in the Permian (Rotliegend) volcano-sedimentary rocks of the Döhlen basin. Three of these seams carry in restricted parts a uranium mineralisation, which was mined by the Wismut. Uranium was introduced into the coal-forming organic material in early stages by surficial waters. The source for the uranium was most likely local volcanic rock units. At a later stage, some remobilisation took place, producing uranium mineralised veinlets in the host rocks of the coal seams. The average ore grade was 0.11% uranium.

=== Unmined deposits ===
The SAG/SDAG Wismut carried out exploration in the whole German Democratic Republic. Several uranium mineralisations were discovered but finally not mined because of the small amount or high costs. The largest unmined resource was discovered in the late 1970s and early 1980s north of Leipzig, hosted by carboniferous volcano-sedimentary rock units. This uranium occurrence near Delitzsch consists of several separate mineralisations. An inferred resource of 6,660 tonnes was taken into the resource base of Wismut and studies were made for underground exploration. However, the high costs prevented realisation. Wismut also discovered a significant supplies of tungsten, niobium, rare-earth elements and phosphate in the area, which is being reinvestigated by a private company since 2008.

Wismut explored a black shale-type uranium mineralisation below the villages of Hauptmannsgrün and Neumark, Saxony west of Zwickau. It led to 2,500 tonnes of inferred uranium resources being added to the resource base of Wismut, but because of the complex nature and small size of the deposit it was decided to not mine it. Another unmined black-shale-type resource is in Rudolstadt in the Thüringer Wald area with inferred resources of 1,300 tonnes.

Several small uranium mineralisations were also explored in the Ore Mountains outside the mined deposit areas. Together they account for another 11,200 tonnes of inferred resources, which were added to the SDAG Wismut resource base.

== Milling ==
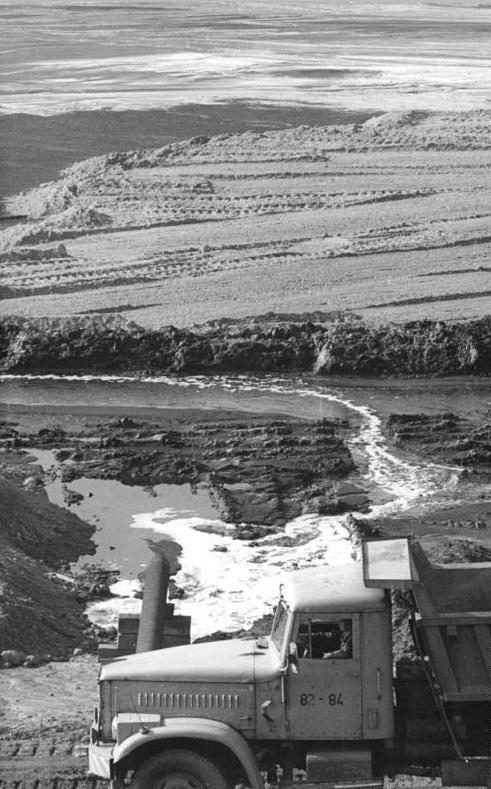
Tailings of Seelingstädt mill in 1990

In the early years of mining, sorting of ore started in the vein style deposits directly on the stopes. High grade ore containing more than 1% uranium was handpicked and later automatically separated and shipped to the Soviet Union without further processing until 1980. Ore containing less than 1% (Fabrikerz - factory ore) was sent to mills. In the early years of SAG Wismut, it simply took over existing plants for processing its uranium ores. These were the mill of a tungsten mine in Lengefeld (Vogtland), the mill of the Tannenbergsthal (Vogtland) tin mine, a plant processing cobalt ore to produce colours at Oberschlema, a nickel processing plant at Aue, and some industrial areas at Freital. Further, a new mill was erected at Johanngeorgenstadt. These small mills produced different concentrates: mechanical, wet-mechanical and chemical (yellowcake). A total of 18 million tonnes of ore were processed in these smaller mills, and the last was shut down in 1962. Milling was concentrated at two central milling sites situated between Zwickau and Ronneburg.

The mill at Crossen (a northern suburb of Zwickau) was erected in 1950 using the site of a former paper mill. It was called Object 101 / Factory 38 (later renamed Aufbereitungsbetrieb 101 - milling division 101) and processed ore from all major Wismut deposits. It produced mechanical as well as chemical concentrates and used for the latter one an alcalic-based technology resulting in yellowcake containing more than 70% uranium. The mill processed a total of 74.7 million tonnes of ore, producing 77,000 tonnes of uranium before it was shut down in 1989. Experimental milling was also carried out to process silver and tin ore from the deposits at Niederschlema-Alberoda and Pöhla.

In 1961 the most modern milling plant (called Aufbereitungsbetrieb 102 - milling division 102) started production at Seelingstädt. It was built near the open pits of the Culmitzsch deposit which it used as tailings management facilities. It processed the majority of ore from Ronneburg, ore and solutions from Königstein, and also ore from the Ore Mountains. Depending on the chemistry of the ore it used both acid and soda-alcalic processes to produce yellowcake. It processed in total 108.8 million tonnes of ore producing concentrate containing 86,273 tonnes of uranium.

About 216,000 tonnes of uranium were delivered in chemical and mechanical concentrates from the mills to the Soviet Union and about 15,000 tonnes were shipped in unprocessed high-grade ore directly from the mines.

The restoration of the tailings storage facilities at the milling sites is a major issue for Wismut GmbH. The tailings at both sites have a total volume of 152 million m^{3} and contain between 50 and 300 g/t uranium and between 50 and 600 g/t arsenic. The activity of radium in the tailings has a total value of 1.5*10^{15} Bq.

== Other company branches ==
Besides the direct mining and milling divisions, Wismut also owned several other company divisions. The Central Geological Service in Grüna near Chemnitz was responsible for exploration work as well as special geological tasks. This service also carried out work for other mining companies in East Germany. In Chemnitz-Siegmar there was a plant for constructing and maintaining the vehicle fleet of the company. In Zwickau-Caisndorf and Aue there were major factories producing equipment for the milling and mining divisions. They also provided equipment to other mining companies in East Germany and Eastern Europe. Wismut had also its own transport branch responsible for bringing workers to their work places. The construction branch was responsible for all building tasks within the company and also carried out public contracts. The company also operated sand pits, both for its construction needs but mostly to get material to refill stopes at Ronneburg. Some of these divisions were liquidated in 1990 because there was no need for them any more. Other were taken out of the Wismut GmbH because no restoration was required on these sites; these and formed DFA GmbH, which was subsequently privatised.

In 2002 Wismut GmbH founded a subsidiary, Wisutec GmbH. This company is responsible for consulting and marketing the restoration technologies developed by Wismut GmbH. It also owns the exploration rights for the tungsten-tin base metal deposit at Pöhla-Globenstein.

== Impact on employees ==
Although the Ore Mountains had a nearly 700-year-old mining history when uranium mining started after World War II, mining had nearly ceased in the area. Thus, there was neither a qualified work force nor mining equipment which could be used. However, after World War II unemployment was high in Germany, and the Soviet occupation zone administration in East Germany ordered the employment centers across the country to supply them with workers. Within a few years thousands of people from all across Germany and refugees from the formerly German regions now part of Poland and the Soviet Union were drafted to work in the uranium mining centers. People were ordered to start working in the uranium mines otherwise there would be strict sanctions for them. At the end of the 1940s, more than 100,000 people worked for SAG Wismut. This also included women, although they did not work on the stopes but operated machinery (locomotives, hoisting machines) at the mines, worked in the mills, laboratories and administration. In contrast to the Czech Republic and the Soviet Union, no prisoners were forced to work in the mines. But most of these people had never worked in the mining industry before and had no qualifications for this work. This and the lack of mining equipment caused the mines to be operated like centuries previously, with a high number of fatal work accidents. Forced drafting of workers ended in 1949, however security measures on the mine sites remained very strict. Between 1951 and 1953, 73 miners accused of espionage and sabotage were deported to the USSR and executed.

The low safety and technology standards meant significant health risks for the miners. Drill hammers arriving for use at the mines in the late 1940s did not allow wet drilling, which led to the exposure of thousands of miners to dangerous quartz dust. Furthermore, narrow galleries in combination with a lack of proper ventilation led to high concentrations of radon and its decay products in the mines. The quartz dust and radon were responsible for the two most serious work related diseases, silicosis and lung cancer. By beginning of 1997, 14,592 cases of silicoses and 5,275 of lung cancer were officially recognised as work-related disease for miners at Wismut. It is estimated that there were 200 fatal accidents between 1946 and 1948 and 376 in the years between 1949 and 1964, including 33 miners being killed in a fire at a mine in Schlema in 1955. The total number of fatal accidents including the estimates for the early years is 772.

During the 1950s the technological equipment and the skill of the Wismut work force improved dramatically. Exposure to radon and quartz dust was significantly reduced by improving mining methods, equipment, ventilation and training the miners. But by then it was already too late for the health of thousands of miners who starting working earlier in the company. During the 1950s, the work force of the company shrank to about 45,000 and stabilised at this level to the end of the 1980s. During these later years, Wismut had one of the best educated work forces of all companies in East Germany, with the highest number of academic degrees per employee.

Miners were organised in the Wismut Industrial Union, which ran sports teams and an orchestra.

== Mining disaster hoax ==
In November 1949, news stories about a mining disaster on site at Johanngeorgenstadt were run in American and West German media. The reports alleged a death toll in the thousands and mass arrests of German miners and staff by Soviet police. In reality, there indeed was a fire on the day of the reported disaster. 40 miners and troops were treated for smoke poisoning and one miner, a pump operator, had been found dead the day following the incident.

== Resources ==
The following table presents the Wismut resources as of 1 January 1991. All values are in tonnes uranium (not uranium oxide). Total unmined resources are a combination of known reserves plus inferred resources. The total uranium potential is the total of unmined and mined resources .

After 1990 there was a little mining in Ronneburg, Niederschlema-Alberoda and Pöhla to reduce the contact surface between uranium ore and groundwater after flooding the mines. In Königstein the mine water cleaning process still produces uranium today, which is sold to international customers. The total production after 1990 is about 1,500 tonnes uranium and is not included in the table.

| Deposit / Occurrence | Years of production | Type | Production | Mined resources | Reserves C_{1} + C_{2} | Inferred resources | Total unmined resources | Total uranium potential | Other resources |
|---|---|---|---|---|---|---|---|---|---|
| uranium field Ronneburg (East Thuringia) | 1950 - 1990 | black shale | ? | 112,914.0 | 51,820.0 | 35,423.0 | 87,243.0 | 200,157.0 | |
| Schmirchau / Reust | 1952–1990 / 1957–1988 | black shale | ? | 65,264.9 | 6,622.8 | 1,512.9 | 8,144.7 | 73,409.6 | |
| Paitzdorf | 1954–1990 | black shale | ? | 22,562.5 | 6,186.5 | 0.0 | 6,186.5 | 28,749.0 | |
| Stolzenberg | 1954-1957 | black shale | ? | 175.5 | 0.0 | 0.0 | 0.0 | 175.5 | |
| Lichtenberg | 1958–1976 | black shale | ? | 14,115.3 | 0,0 | 0,0 | 0,0 | 14,115.3 | |
| Beerwalde (including Korbußen) | 1974-1990 | black shale | ? | 7,658.4 | 15,912.7 | 0,0 | 15,912.7 | 23,571.1 | |
| Drosen | 1982–1990 | black shale | 2,941.1 | 3,137.7 | 23,098.0 | 3,760.4 | 26,858.4 | 29,996.1 | |
| Paitzdorf Flanken | exploration area | black shale | 0.0 | 0.0 | 0.0 | 367.0 | 367.0 | 367.0 | |
| Zeitz-Baldenhain | exploration area | black shale | 0.0 | 0.0 | 0.0 | 16,000.0 | 16,000.0 | 16,000.0 | |
| Kauern | exploration area | black shale | 0.0 | 0.0 | 0.0 | 453.0 | 453.0 | 453.0 | |
| Prehna | exploration area | black shale | 0.0 | 0.0 | 0.0 | 8,531.0 | 8,531.0 | 8,531.0 | |
| Untitz | exploration area | black shale | 0.0 | 0.0 | 0.0 | 2000.0 | 2000.0 | 2000.0 | |
| Crimmitschau Fault Zone | exploration area | black shale | 0.0 | 0.0 | 0.0 | 2,560.0 | 2,560.0 | 2,560.0 | |
| Lichtenberg-North | exploration area | black shale | 0.0 | 0.0 | 0.0 | 230.0 | 230.0 | 230.0 | |
| uranium field Schlema (western Ore Mountains) | 1946–1990 | vein | 80,413.5 | 90,554.4 | 1,032.0 | 5,017.0 | 6,049.0 | 96,603.4 | Ag, Co, Ni, Bi, Pb, Zn, Se, Fe |
| Niederschlema-Alberoda | 1949–1990 | vein | 73,105.0 | 82,609.4 | 1,032.0 | 1,017.0 | 2,049.0 | 84,658.4 | Ag, Co, Ni, Bi, Pb, Zn, Se |
| Oberschlema | 1946–1960 | vein | 7,098.9 | 7,945.0 | 0.0 | 0.0 | 0.0 | 7,945.0 | Cu, Fe |
| Schneeberg | 1946–1956 | vein | 209.7 | >210 | 0.0 | 0.0 | 0.0 | >210 | Ag, Co, Ni, Bi |
| Bernsbach | exploration area | vein | 0.0 | 0.0 | 0.0 | 4000.0 | 4000.0 | 4000.0 | |
| Königstein (Elbe Sandstone Mountains) | 1967–1990 | sedimentary (sandstone) | 17,756.0 | 19,257.0 | 4,304.0 | 4,251.0 | 8,555.0 | 27,812.0 | |
| uranium field Culmitzsch (eastern Thuringia) | 1951–1967 | sedimentary (sandstone, siltstone and limestone) | ? | 11,956.0 | 0.0 | 3,350.0 | 3,350.0 | 15,306.1 | |
| Culmitzsch | 1955–1967 | sedimentary (sandstone, siltstone and limestone) | ? | 9,216.6 | 0.0 | 0.0 | 0.0 | 9,216.6 | |
| Sorge-Trünzig | 1951–1957 | sedimentary (sandstone, siltstone and limestone) | ? | 2,292.4 | 0.0 | 0.0 | 0.0 | 2,292.4 | |
| Gauern | 1953–1957 | sedimentary (sandstone, siltstone and limestone) | ? | 427.7 | 0.0 | 0.0 | 0.0 | 427.7 | |
| Gera-Süd | exploration area | sedimentary (sandstone, siltstone and limestone) | ? | 19.4 | 0.0 | 3,350.0 | 3,350.0 | 3,369.0 | |
| Zobes (Vogtland mountains) | 1949–1963 | vein | 4,673.1 | 5,031.0 | 0.0 | 0.0 | 0.0 | 5,031.0 | Cu, W |
| Freital (Döhlen basin near Dresden) | 1947-53; 1952–55; 1968-89 | sedimentary (hard coal) | 3,691.0 | 3,977.0 | 0.0 | 0.0 | 0.0 | 3,977.0 | hard coal |
| Johanngeorgenstadt (western Ore Mountains) | 1946–1958 | vein | 3,585.0 | 4,100.0 | 0.0 | 0.0 | 0.0 | 4,100.0 | Ag, Bi, Co, Ni |
| mining area Pöhla | 1957–1990 | vein | 1,217.0 | 1,322.0 | 765.5 | 4,577.4 | 5,342.9 | 7,882.0 | magnetite, Sn, Zn, W, In, Cd, Ag, As |
| Tellerhäuser | 1983–1990 | vein | 1,203.6 | 1,307.5 | 765.5 | 4,577.4 | 5,342.9 | 7,854.0 | magnetite, Sn, Zn, W, In, Cd, Ag, As |
| Hämmerlein | exploration area | vein | 12.8 | 14.0 | 0.0 | 0.0 | 0.0 | 14.0 | Sn, Zn, W, In, Cd |
| Globenstein | 1957–1960 | vein | 0.6 | 0.6 | 0.0 | 0.0 | 0.0 | 0.6 | magnetite, Sn, W |
| mining area Schwarzenberg (western Ore Mountains) | 1947–1959 | vein | 1,346.5 | 1,445.8 | 0.0 | 0.0 | 0.0 | 1,445.8 | magnetite, Sn, Zn, W |
| Antonsthal (Weißer Hirsch) | 1949–1959 | vein | 747.7 | 826.8 | 0.0 | 0.0 | 0.0 | 828.8 | magnetite, Sn, Zn, W |
| Seifenbach | 1947–1955 | vein | 230.0 | 280.0 | 0.0 | 0.0 | 0.0 | 280.0 | |
| Tannenbaum (September) | 1948–1955 | vein | 90.0 | 100.0 | 0.0 | 0.0 | 0.0 | 100.0 | |
| Neuoberhaus | 1947–1955 | vein | 62.0 | 70.0 | 0.0 | 0.0 | 0.0 | 70.0 | |
| Mai | 1949–1955 | vein | 50.0 | >50.0 | 0.0 | 0.0 | 0.0 | >50.0 | |
| Unruhe-Halbe Meile | 1950–1953 | vein | 47.0 | 55.0 | 0.0 | 0.0 | 0.0 | 55.0 | |
| Tellerhäuser-Kaffenberg | 1950–1954 | vein | 42.0 | 50.0 | 0.0 | 0.0 | 0.0 | 50.0 | |
| Rabenberg (Juni) | 1949–1955 | vein | 32.0 | >32.0 | 0.0 | 0.0 | 0.0 | >32.0 | |
| Raschau-Grünstaauml | 1950–1954 | vein | 22.0 | 25.0 | 0.0 | 0.0 | 0.0 | 25.0 | |
| Rittersgrün (Segen Gottes) | 1948–1954 | vein | 20.4 | 24.0 | 0.0 | 0.0 | 0.0 | 24.0 | |
| Erla-Crandorf | 1948–1954 | vein | 12.3 | 15.0 | 0.0 | 0.0 | 0.0 | 15.0 | |
| Breitenbrunn (Margarethe) | 1946–1951 | vein | 7.0 | >7.0 | 0.0 | 0.0 | 0.0 | >7.0 | |
| Bermsgrün | 1950-1953; 1956 | vein | 2.1 | >2.1 | 0.0 | 0.0 | 0.0 | >2.1 | |
| Schneckenstein (Vogtland mountains) | 1949–1959 | vein | 953.2 | 1,136.3 | 0.0 | 0.0 | 0.0 | 1,136.3 | |
| Annaberg-Buchholz (central Ore Mountains) | 1947–1958 | vein | 450.0 | 520.0 | 0.0 | 0.0 | 0.0 | 520.0 | Ag, Co, Bi, Ni |
| Bergen (Vogtland mountains) | 1949–1959 | vein | 162.4 | 197.0 | 0.0 | 0.0 | 0.0 | 197.0 | |
| Niederschlag-Bärenstein (central Ore Mountains) | 1947–1954 | vein | 132.7 | 155.0 | 0.0 | 0.0 | 0.0 | 155.0 | fluorite, barite |
| Marienberg (central Ore Mountains) | 1947–1954 | vein | 121.0 | >121.0 | 0.0 | 0.0 | 0.0 | >121.0 | fluorite, barite, Ag, Co, Ni, Bi |
| Dittrichshütte (southern Thuringia) | 1950–1953 | black shale | 112.6 | 163.4 | 0.0 | 0.0 | 0.0 | 163.4 | |
| Gottesberg (Vogtland mountains) | 1949–1955 | vein | 56.4 | 68.6 | 0.0 | 0.0 | 0.0 | 68.6 | Sn, W |
| Steinach (southern Thuringia) | 1953–1954 | black shale | 43.6 | 59.7 | 0.0 | 0.0 | 0.0 | 49.7 | |
| Niederpöbel (eastern Ore Mountains) | 1948–1953 | vein | 30.3 | >30.3 | 0.0 | 0.0 | 0.0 | 30.3 | |
| Bärenhecke (eastern Ore Mountains) | 1949–1954 | vein | ? | 44.2 | 0.0 | 0.0 | 0.0 | 44.2 | |
| Schleusingen (southern Thuringia) | 1950–1953 | sedimentary (sandstone) | 14.0 | 27.0 | 0.0 | 0.0 | 0.0 | 27.0 | |
| Freiberg (eastern Ore Mountains) | 1948–1950 | vein | ? | 5.4 | 0.0 | 0.0 | 0.0 | 5.4 | |
| NW Saxony | exploration area | volcanic | 0.0 | 0.0 | 0.0 | 6,660.0 | 6,660.0 | 6,660.0 | W, REE, Nb, Ta, phosphate |
| Kyhna-Schenkenberg | exploration area | volcanic | 0.0 | 0.0 | 0.0 | 2,500.0 | 2,500.0 | 2,500.0 | |
| Werben | exploration area | volcanic | 0.0 | 0.0 | 0.0 | 2,500.0 | 2,500.0 | 2,500.0 | |
| Serbitz | exploration area | volcanic | 0.0 | 0.0 | 0.0 | 1,000.0 | 1,000.0 | 1,000.0 | |
| "southern mineralisation" | exploration area | volcanic | 0.0 | 0.0 | 0.0 | 660.0 | 660.0 | 660.0 | |
| Hauptmannsgrün-Neumark (Vogtland mountains) | exploration area | black shale | 0.0 | 0.0 | 0.0 | 2,270.0 | 2,270.0 | 2,270.0 | |
| Erzgebirge and Vogtland mountains | exploration area | vein | 0.0 | 0.0 | 0.0 | 11,200.0 | 11,200.0 | 11,200.0 | |
| NW Pöhla | exploration area | vein | 0.0 | 0.0 | 0.0 | 6,050.0 | 6,050.0 | 6,050.0 | |
| central Ore Mountains | exploration area | vein | 0.0 | 0.0 | 0.0 | 2,384.0 | 2,384.0 | 2,384.0 | |
| western Erzgebirge (excluding Schlema and Pöhla) | exploration area | vein | 0.0 | 0.0 | 0.0 | 1,471.0 | 1,471.0 | 1,471.0 | |
| eastern Erzgebirge | exploration area | vein | 0.0 | 0.0 | 0.0 | 1,295.0 | 1,295.0 | 1,295.0 | |
| Rudolstadt (southern Thuringia) | exploration area | black shale | 0.0 | 0.0 | 0.0 | 1,300.0 | 1,300.0 | 1,300.0 | |
| Wismut total to 1990 | 1947–1990 | / | ca. 230,000 | 251,510.0 | 57,922.0 | 74,078.0 | 132,000.0 | 383,510.0 | Sn, W, Zn, Fe, Cu, Bi, Co, Ni, Ag, As, In, Cd, REE; Nb; Ta, phosphate, barite, fluorite |

== Industrial artwork collection ==
During the companies active life, it commissioned about 4,300 artworks to be made of its operations, often in the style of socialist realism and often portraits of workers. After German reunification in 1990, the foundation cleaning up environmental damage took responsibility for the artwork, but the collection remains inaccessible to the public in the former headquarters building. An inventory has been published by the Dresden Institute for Cultural Studies.

== In literature ==
The novel Rummelplatz, by Werner Bräunig, deals with work in the Soviet owned uranium mines of the Wismut AG and covers the time span from the foundation of the GDR in 1949 to the uprising in East Germany on June 17, 1953.

== See also ==
- Uranium ore deposits
- Ore genesis
- Uranium
- List of uranium mines
- Uranium mining
- Nuclear fuel cycle
