= Fall River Museum of Contemporary Art =

Museum in Massachusetts, United States

Coordinates: 41.7006°N 71.1524°W

Fall River Museum of Contemporary Art (FR MoCa) is a contemporary art organization in Fall River, Massachusetts. Directed by artists Harry Gould Harvey IV and Brittni Ann Harvey. It first operated in the first floor of a former mill on Bedford Street.

Dissent Magazine wrote about the gallery: "None of it is in service to American aristocracy; the class politics here are lived rather than simply aesthetic."

== History ==
The museum was first opened during the COVID-19 pandemic, in October 2020. In 2023, the gallery moved to 44 Troy Street. The museum interfaces with the classes on social practice and studio art that Harry Gould Harvey IV and Brittni Ann Harvey teach together at local high schools.

== Programming ==
The gallery's inaugural show Group Exhibition #1, featured work by artists Allyson Vieira, Flannery Silva, Brittni Ann Harvey, Michael Assiff, Gregory Kalliche, Zachary John Martin, Susan Mohl Powers, Jeffrey Alan Scudder, and Faith Wilding. It took place as part of Fall River's FABRIC arts festival.

The exhibition Group Exhibition #2 took place in 2021, and featured art by Kaws & Barbara Kruger, Richard Renaldi, and Norbert Garcia Jr.

The exhibition Group Exhibition III featured art by Bella Carlos, Dorothy Carlos, Tom Forkin, Christopher K. Ho, Brian Oakes, Tim Simonds and Marisa Takal.

In 2025, the exhibiton [See] [Saw] [Sound] [Wave] took place. Included were recorded works by Alvin Lucier, Pauline Oliveros, and Laurie Spiegel, a sound installation by Erik DeLuca, and lithographs and sound-dampening, wall-mounted textile panels by Aviva Silverman. According to writer Caitlan Anklam, the exhibition "centers on a social sculpture created by Harry Gould Harvey IV and his collaborators. A pair of whisper mirrors constructed of white plaster are positioned on opposite edges of the gallery, rectangular structures with concave centers that are so large you need to use a step stool to lean into them. Once you do, you can speak at a whisper to someone else across the gallery, in the other mirror, the sound traveling fifty-five feet across the space."
