= Aviva Silverman =

American artist and activist (born 1986)

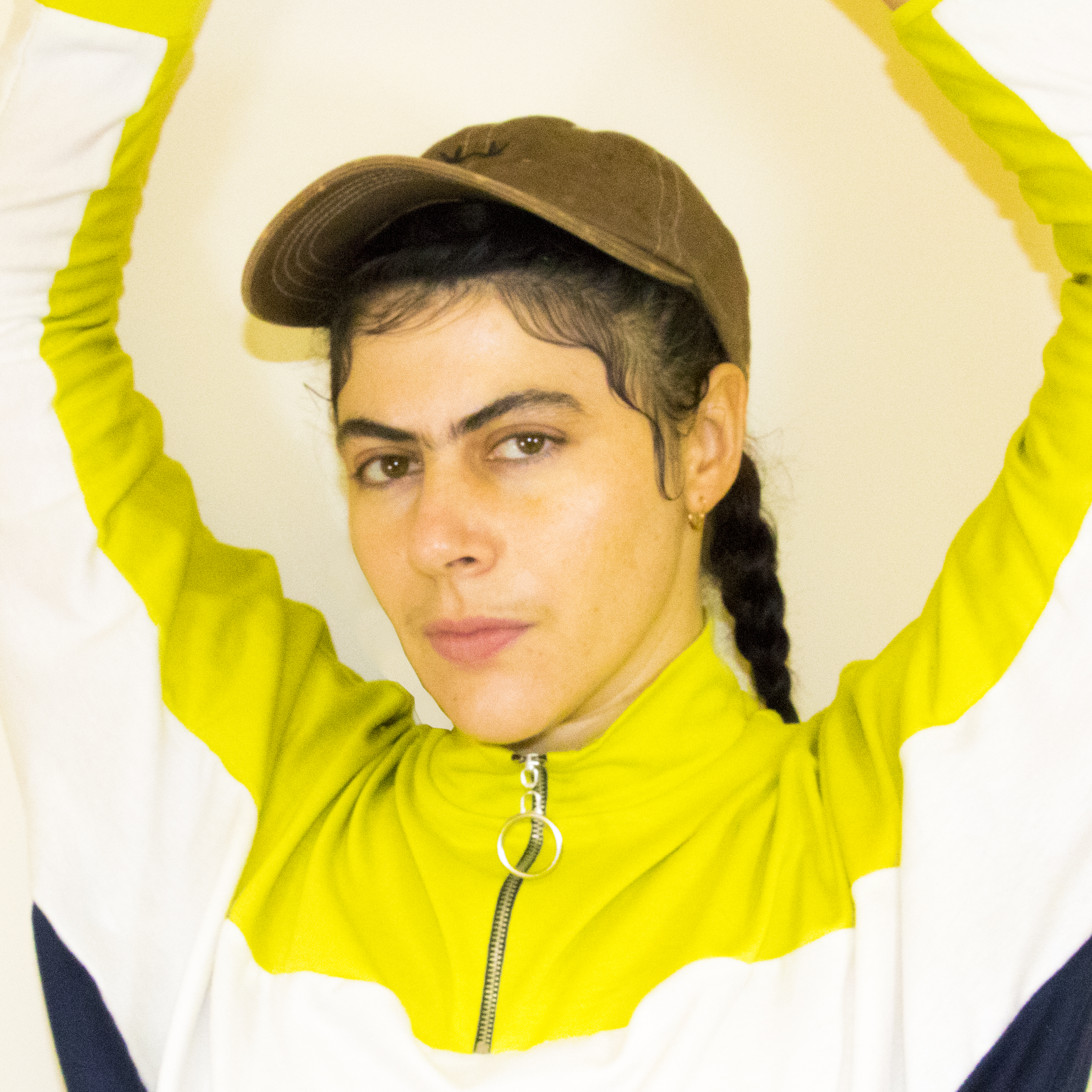
- Portrait of Aviva Silverman
- Born: April 8, 1986 (age 40); New York, New York
- Education: Maryland Institute College of Art
- Movement: Sculpture, interspecies performance art, installation, and activism
- Website: https://www.avivasilverman.com

Aviva Silverman (born April 8, 1986) is an American artist and activist who works in sculpture and performance. Their practice makes use of religion, gender nonconformity, miniatures, and nonhuman actors to investigate existing forms, in particular, technologies of spiritual and political surveillance. Silverman has exhibited at numerous galleries and museums including MoMA P.S.1, Atlanta Contemporary, and the Swiss Institute. Their work has appeared in Artforum, The New Yorker, BBC Radio, Art in America, Flash Art, and Art Papers.

== Early life and education ==
Silverman was born in New York City, in 1986, to Jo Baker and Larry Silverman. Silverman was raised in Reform Judaism, under the rabbinical leadership of Rabbi Elyse D. Frishman. Silverman's mother was a textile designer and a faux-finish decorator, who painted the Fashion Cafe, Queen Latifah's mother's house, and the United Synagogue of Hoboken, N.J. During high school, amid their mother's battle with metastatic cancer, Silverman became a competitive swimmer. They won three state championships, competed in the Maccabiah Games and in the Junior Olympics, in Princeton, New Jersey. Silverman attended the Maryland Institute College of Art, majoring in sculpture. Fellow classmates included the fashion historian/stylist Gabriel Held, director Giselle Bailey, and artist Jacolby Satterwhite.

== Work ==
After graduating, Silverman joined Pierre Huyghe's studio, working on his Zoodram series, which was shown at Marian Goodman Gallery. Silverman left shortly after the piece resulted in a genocide of exotic fish. From 2011 to 2014, Silverman assisted the post-human experimental architecture studio Reversible Destiny, under Madeline Gins, helping edit Gins' poems, collaborating on the perfume Man Repellant, and working on her final book, Alive Forever, Not If But When, which remains unpublished.

Between 2011 and 2016, Silverman created "Dog Plays," a series of performance pieces involving nonhuman (canine) actors from whom prerecorded human voices were projected. Among the human voice actors were Vaginal Davis, who played Charles Dickens, Karl Holmquist as Steven Wright, Eileen Myles as Mark Zuckerberg, Geo Wyeth, Aisha Mirza, and more. Silverman acted the role of the drummer in "Apartment (Mother Courage)" at The Whitney Museum of American Art in 2015.

In 2017, Silverman published the book Is It Soup Yet?, with an introduction by the food writer and Great British Baking Show series four runner-up Ruby Tandoh.

In 2019, as part of a solo exhibition with the Swiss Institute, Silverman hosted a panel on gender-nonconforming narratives within the Bible, with activists Cyrus Dunham and Abby Stein. Later that year, Silverman hosted a lecture at the Volksbühne, in Berlin, with the Theater of the Oppressed's Barbara Santos and the game designer Emily Shinada.

== Themes ==
Silverman's art "embraces mysticism and narratives of protection and redemption" and is "interested in how we give form to entities that are understood to be bodiless and genderless." Their work has employed dogs, glassblowing, Americana, deformed nativity figurines, taxidermic birds, and cosplay angels. They are influenced by Donna Haraway, David Hammons, Adrian Piper, and David Wojnarowicz.

== Personal life ==
Silverman is involved in prison-abolition and Palestinian-justice organizing, and is a collective member of the Trans Oral History Project, a community archive devoted to the collection, preservation and sharing of trans histories .
