= Cian Dayrit =

Filipino visual artist

- Born: 1989 (age 36–37); Manila, Philippines
- Occupation: Visual artist

Cian Dayrit (born 1989) is a Filipino multimedia artist.

== Early life and education ==
Dayrit was born in 1989 in Metro Manila, Philippines. He graduated from the University of the Philippines Diliman's Fine Arts program in 2011.

== Work ==
Dayrit's interdisciplinary practice explores colonialism and ethnography, archaeology, history, and mythology. He has exhibited at venues such as the Metropolitan Museum of Manila.

Dayrit's first solo exhibition, The Bla-Bla Archaeological Complex, opened at the Jorge B. Vargas Museum in 2013. The show examined the role that varying strategies of display and representation, such as archaeological and architectural structures, play in understanding history. The show explored issues of identity, heritage, and nationhood.

Dayrit's second and third solo exhibitions, Polycephalous and Spectacles of the Third World, continue his inquiry into, "origins and histories, and their representations in visual apparatuses, from the map, curiosity cabinet, and on to the museum."

In late 2017, Artnet announced that Dayrit would be featured in the 4th New Museum Triennial titled Songs for Sabotage at the New Museum in New York in 2018. The Triennial, co-curatored by Gary Carrion-Murayari and Alex Gartenfeld, explored, "interventions into cities, infrastructures, and the networks of everyday life, bringing together objects that could potentially create shared, or common, experiences."

Dayrit was featured in the 11th Berlin Biennale in Berlin in 2020.

His practice has been written in the Encyclopaedia of Philippine Art by the Cultural Center of the Philippines.

== Exhibitions ==
=== Solo exhibitions ===
- The Bla-Bla Archaeological Complex, U.P. Vargas Museum, Quezon City, Philippines, 2013
- Polycephalous, Art Informal, San Juan City, Philippines, 2014
- Spectacles of the Third World, Tin-Aw Gallery, Makati, Philippines, 2015
- Busis Ibat Ha Kanayunan (Voices from the Hinterlands), Bellas Artes Projects, Makati, Philippines, 2018
- Beyond the God's Eye, Nome Gallery, Berlin, Germany, 2019

=== Group exhibitions ===
- Omega, Tam-Awan Village Gallery, Baguio City, Philippines, 2013
- Applied Savagery, Now Gallery, Makati, Philippines, 2013
- The President’s Office, U.P. Vargas Museum, Quezon City, Philippines, 2013
- Paperviews 14: On Immanence, Project Space Pilipinas, Lucban, Quezon Province, Philippines, 2014
- Exposition, Lopez Memorial Museum, 2016
- Almost There, Jorge B. Vargas Museum, Quezon City, Philippines, 2017
- Shelf Life of Being, MONO8, Manila, Philippines, 2021

== Awards ==
- Finalist, Ateneo Art Awards - Fernando Zóbel Prizes for Visual Art (2014)
- Winner, Ateneo Art Awards - Fernando Zóbel Prizes for Visual Art (2017)
- Recipient, Cultural Center of the Philippines Thirteen Artists Awards (2018)
