= Bergenite =

Rare uranyl phosphate of the more specific phosphuranylite group

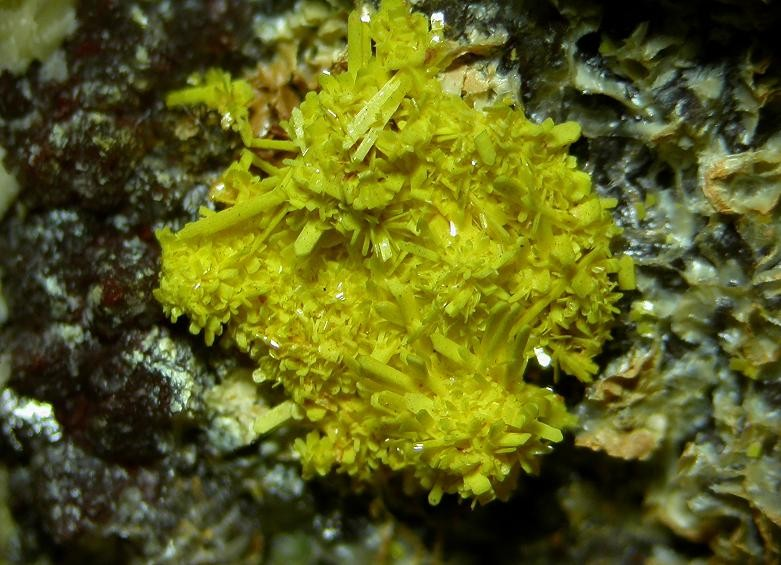

General
- Category: Uranyl phosphate mineral
- Formula: Ca_{2}Ba_{4}[(UO_{2})_{3}O_{2}(PO_{4})_{2}]_{3}·16(H_{2}O) or (Ba,Ca)_{2}(UO_{2})_{3}(PO_{4})_{2}(OH)_{4}·5.5(H_{2}O)
- IMA symbol: Bgn
- Strunz classification: 8.EC.40
- Crystal system: Monoclinic
- Crystal class: Prismatic (2/m) (same H-M symbol)
- Space group: P2_{1}/c

Identification
- Color: Yellow to greenish yellow
- Crystal habit: Acicular, tabular
- Mohs scale hardness: 2–3
- Streak: yellow white
- Diaphaneity: semitransparent
- Density: 4.1
- Optical properties: Biaxial (-)
- Refractive index: n_{α} = 1.660 n_{β} = 1.700 - 1.710 n_{γ} = 1.722
- Birefringence: δ = 0.062
- Other characteristics: Radioactive, Occurrence: secondary uranium phosphate mineral

Bergenite is a rare uranyl phosphate of the more specific phosphuranylite group. The phosphuranylite-type sheet in bergenite is a new isomer of the group, with the uranyl phosphate tetrahedra varying in an up-up-down, same-same-opposite (uuduudSSOSSO) orientation. All bergenite samples have been found in old mine dump sites. Uranyl minerals are a large constituent of uranium deposits.

The phosphuranylites are one of the two major groups of the uranyl series, and are the most extensive of the uranium minerals. Uranyl phosphates include 45 different minerals, at least 16 of which belong to the phosphuranylite type topology, including dumontite, vanmeersscheite, upalite, and the most characteristic, phosphuranylite. As explained by Frost et al., the uranyl phosphates display diverse chemical and structural features, which often exhibit the geochemical conditions present during formation.

== Structure and composition ==
The chemical composition given by Locock and Burns was determined by qualitative electron microprobe examination on a JEOL JXA-8600 Superprobe at a voltage of 15 kV and current of 0.9 nA. The ideal composition of Bergenite is Ca_{2}Ba_{4}[(UO_{2})_{3}O_{2}(PO_{4})_{2}]_{3}(H_{2}O)_{16}. Calcium and barium substitute for each other, with the precise filling of the Ba(1) site 96.8% Ba and 3.2% Ca, and the Ba (2) site containing 87.9% Ba and 12.2% Ca, with Frost (2007) assuming no vacancies and only Ca and Ba substitution. These results give the idealized formula of Ba4/3Ca2/3. A microprobe analysis gave oxide percentages of P_{2}O_{5} 10.96%. UO_{3} 62.54%, BaO13.96%, CaO 2.44%, and HrO 10.06%.

Uranyl minerals in general are very complicated, with two-thirds of the 173 species’ structures unknown. Bergenite, like other phosphuranylite minerals, consists of uranyl phosphate sheets. Bergenite’s uranyl phosphate sheet is a new geometrical isomer of the group which differs in the orientation of the phosphate tetrahedra, and contains H_{2}O along with calcium and barium cations in the interlayer. The structure was determined by direct methods. As proposed by Frost et al., Uranyl pentagonal dipyramids share edges with each other, and are then connected to uranyl hexagonal dipyramids on both sides. The hexagonal dipyramids then link with phosphate tetrahedra to form sheets that connect to adjacent pentagonal chains. The phosphate tetrahedra holding the uranyl chains together display an up-up-down-up-up-down, same-same-opposite orientation (uuduudSSO).

Two formula units of the unit cell contain three UO_{2}O_{5} pentagonal dipyramids, two UO_{2}O_{5} hexagonal dipyramids, and three PO_{4} tetrahedra. The Ba(1) site is in 11-fold coordination with oxygen atoms from UO_{2} polyhedra, and Ba(2) site is in tenfold coordination with UO_{2} ions and H_{2}O. Also included in the structure of bergenite are hydrogen bonded water molecules, with the network displaying very weak to strong H-bonds. The inconsistency of the bonds originally caused confusion as to whether it was H_{2}O or OH within the mineral, but further observations of Raman spectra proved it to be water. It is the placement of the water molecules that determines the stability of the structure. The positions of the hydrogens in the unit cell remain undiscovered.

== Physical properties ==
Bergenite forms as a dark yellow crust with well-developed, small thin needle-like crystals. An original description of bergenite is the orthorhombic symmetry and a density greater than 4.1 g/cm^{3}.

== Geologic occurrence and location ==
Phosphuranylites usually precipitate from solution containing uranium, phosphorus, potassium, and calcium. Most phosphuranylite, and all bergenite specimens, are generated from the waste of various mines. This is a low-temperature and often low-pressure process. Bergenite occurs in fractures of quartz, muscovite, and plagioclase, especially along cleavage planes.

Bergenite was first discovered at a now deserted mine dump of the SDAG Wismut shaft 254 in Mechelgrun, Vogtland Mining District, Saxony, Germany near the city of Bergen, Lower Saxony. Other samples have also been found in uranium deposits in the Black Forest, Germany, and in graphitic uranium ore in South Korea.

== Special characteristics ==
Uranyl phosphates are looked at for environmental concerns, for they are related to hydration-oxidation of used nuclear fuel. As Burns suggests, uranyl minerals affect the concentration of uranium in groundwater and surrounding systems.

== See also ==
- Beraunite
