= Harry Gould Harvey IV =

American artist based in Fall River

- Born: 1991 (age 34–35); United States
- Occupation: Artist
- Known for: Contemporary art, assemblage, photography
- Spouse: Brittni Ann Harvey

Harry Gould Harvey IV (born 1991) is an American artist living and working in Fall River, MA, known for working with themes of mysticism, ecology, and history. Along with his wife, Brittni Ann Harvey, he co-directs the Fall River Museum of Contemporary Art.

== Early life ==
Harvey is a high school dropout. Besides being an artist, Harvey has worked as a welder, bronze patina finisher, and carpenter. As a teenager, he began to take photos in the context of the hardcore and punk music scene. Early in his career, he worked as a photojournalist, shooting for outlets such as Bloomberg Business Week.

== Career ==
Drawing on his background and upbringing, Harvey often uses detritus from his Massachusetts town of Fall River for artworks. For instance, in his 2023 exhibition Sick Metal he used wood from fallen trees to create frames for his drawings. Harvey's art is in the permanent collection of Kadist.

Harvey was included in the 2021 edition of the New Museum Triennial, Soft Water Hard Stone. Writing for the New York Times, critic Holland Cotter described Harvey as "maker of quasi-mystical assemblages" and "one of this Triennial’s finds."

In 2025, he began to be represented by PPOW Gallery in New York City.
