= BiCoNi Formation =

The BiCoNi Formation is a hydrothermal lode formation, in which bismuth, cobalt, nickel and uranium ores have coalesced. It occurs mainly in the Ore Mountains and is the youngest formation in the hydrothermal sequence (polymetalliferous (kb) formation, iron-barite (eba) formation, precious brownspar (eb) formation, fluorite-barite (fba) formation, BiCoNi formation). Due to its combination with uranium, it is occasionally also called the bismuth-cobalt-nickel-uranium formation.

== Genesis ==
The BiCoNi Formation emerged during the contact metamorphic restructuring of sedimentary slate in the course of Variscan granite intrusions during the Subhercynian-Austrian (Austrisch) cycle about 100–80 million years ago. It is the product of an intracrustal, epithermal paragenesis. It runs in quartz lode types as the primary ores or cobalt and nickel, which usually occur together with arsenides, native bismuth and pitchblende.

== Use ==
The BiCoNi Formation has been intensively mined since the Late Middle Ages for bismuth, later cobalt and nickel, and, since the late 19th century, also for uranium. In the second half of the 20th century it was intensively mined by SDAG Wismut.

== Literature ==
- Oscar Walter Oelsner (1958), Die erzgebirgischen Granite, ihre Vererzung und die Stellung der BiCoNi-Formation innerhalb dieser Vererzung, Geologie (in German), vol. Jg. 7, Berlin, pp. 682–701
- G. Leithold; et al. (1962), Kammer der Technik, Fachverband Bergbau (ed.), Taschenbuch Bergbau: Tiefbau (in German), vol. III, Leipzig: Deutscher Verlag für Grundstoffindustrie, pp. 30–35
- U. Lipp, S. Flach, Landesamt für Umwelt, Landwirtschaft und Geologie (ed.), Wismut-, Kobalt-, Nickel- und Silbererze im Nordteil des Schneeberger Lagerstättenbezirkes, Bergbau in Sachsen (in German), vol. 10
- Axel Hiller, Werner Schuppan (31 December 2007), Landesamt für Umwelt, Landwirtschaft und Geologie (ed.), Geologie und Uranbergbau im Revier Schlema-Alberoda, Bergbau in Sachsen (in German), vol. 14 (1. ed.)
