= Frank Benson (artist, born 1976) =

American sculptor

Frank Benson (born 1976 in Norfolk, Virginia) is an American sculptor and photographer based in Brooklyn, New York City, New York. Benson earned his BFA from the Maryland Institute College of Art in 1998. He then studied under among others artist Charles Ray at UCLA from which in 2003 he received his MFA.

From April 2013 until March 2014 Benson's work "Human Sculpture (jessie) was displayed on the New York City High Line as part of the exhibition "Busted".

Benson gained widespread attention for his piece in the 2015 New Museum Triennial "Surround Audience", a realistic sculpture of the transgender artist and poet Juliana Huxtable whose work was also included in the exhibition.
