= Schneckenstein =

Coordinates: 50°24′48″N 12°27′04″E

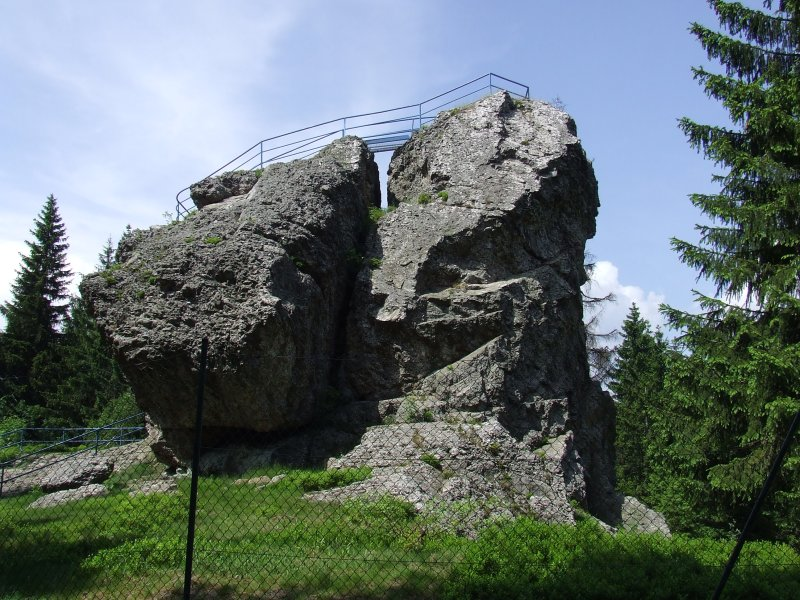

Highest point
- Elevation: 883 m (2,897 ft)

Geography
- Location: Saxony, Germany

The Schneckenstein is 23-metre-high rock formation near the village of the same name in Saxony, southeastern Germany. Its summit is 883 metres above sea level.
