= Chu Yun =

Chinese conceptual artist (born 1977)

- 储云
- Born: 1977 (age 47–48)
- Occupation: Artist

Chu Yun (Chinese: 储云; pinyin: Chǔ Yún; born 1977) is a Chinese conceptual artist.
