= Karl Holmqvist =

Swedish artist

Karl Holmqvist (born 1964), is a Swedish artist known for his text based works, poetry and readings. Holmqvist has exhibited at the ICA - Institute of Contemporary Arts 2009, CAM - Chelsea Art Museum, 2009, The Living Art Museum, Reykjavik (2008), Tensta Konsthall (2008) Manifesta 7 - Comitato Manifesta 7, Bolzano (2008) and at PERFORMA 05 - Performa, New York City, NY (2005)
