= Firenze Lai =

Firenze Lai Ching Yin (Chinese: 黎清妍; born 1984) is an artist, an illustrator, an editorial designer and the co-founder of Hulahoop Gallery of Hong Kong. She is a graduate from the painting program of Hong Kong Art School (HKAS). Her works frequently depict anonymous figures as subjects, and explore the issues of psychological landscapes, the mind and body, human relationships, collectiveness, and social experiences and space. Her paintings were exhibited in various international locations including the 10th Shanghai Biennale (2014), the 2015 New Museum Triennial, and the 57th Venice Biennale (2017), as well as different local venues such as Para Site and Tai Kwun Contemporary. Another medium that she worked closely with are sketches and drawings, which she compiled in several published monographs along with selections of her paintings. Her illustrations are also known to be featured regularly in Mao Pao Weekly.

== Biography ==
=== Early life ===
Firenze Lai was born in 1984 in Hong Kong to a working-class family living in a public housing estate. Her family of six relied on her mother who worked at a snake soup restaurant to sustain financially. Lai recalled that her mother always had to disassemble toxin-containing snake meat with bare hands at work, which had left her with rough hands and "deformed, incomplete" fingers. This early observation on the uniqueness and abnormalities of human bodies was developed into an interest in studying figures.

Since Lai's mother was often caught up at work, Lai and her elder sisters used to spend their free time exploring around Tsing Yi, the neighborhood which they resided in. From the age of five, she would travel across the Stonecutters' Bridge and Cheung Tsing Bridge overlooking the Rambler Channel with her siblings and even alone. As her interest to wander continued, her exploration radius gradually expanded throughout her childhood.

=== Education ===
In 2006, Lai graduated from Hong Kong Art School (HKAS), the education division of Hong Kong Arts Centre (HKAC), with a major in painting. During her years at HKAS, she would stay awake to draw throughout the night.

=== Career ===
==== Illustration ====
Since 2005, a year before her graduation, Lai began illustrating for a psychology column in Ming Pao Weekly on a regular basis. While professional illustrators are often challenged to depict a wide array of subjects including those which they are not familiar with, she found the requirements of the column aligning with her personal interests. She was later involved in other illustration works for print advertisements, books and magazines such as Muse.

During the Umbrella Movement, a pro-democracy movement happened in 2014, Lai illustrated for the cover of the second issue of Harcourt Village Voice, which is a zine dedicated to record the events occurred at the occupation taken place on Harcourt Road.

==== Editorial design ====
After graduating from Hong Kong Art School in 2006, she became a freelance editorial designer. She mainly designed books of Chinese literary works, including works by Lau Shiu Ming Joseph (劉紹銘愛讀散文系列), Sharon Zhong (春在綠蕪中, 2008 new edition), Chan Chi Tak (愔齋讀書錄), Pun Kwok Ling (愛琉璃, 無有紀年) and Tang Siu Wa (斑駁日常).

==== Hulahoop Gallery ====
In 2007, she co-founded and operated the Hulahoop Gallery with Lulu Ngie (倪鷺露), an artist and fellow graduate from Hong Kong Arts School majoring in painting in 2006. The gallery was located at G/F, 23 Sau Wa Fong, St. Francis Street, Wanchai. However, it closed down by the end of 2009 with the farewell exhibition Lustfully Yours porno exhibition (November 20 - December 13, 2009).

==== Painting and drawing ====
It was not until 2011 when Lai started to focus on painting and drawing as her main profession. A majority of her painted and drawn works portray anonymous figures intertwined with the surrounding settings which are sometimes identifiable, local spaces (e.g. the interior of a public bus, the walls inside an MTR station). Although these works display local specificities, she emphasized the possibility of going beyond such geographical confines when viewing her pieces, which can essentially be depicting anywhere and even anyone. She refers to her artworks as "figural works" in opposition to "portraitures", as the former term erases the particular identification of a protagonist, and underscores the universality and ambiguity of the subject. The gender of the figures she portrayed is often unknown. Her expressive and ambiguous figurative works perpetuate the duality of human experience as individual yet collective. While our personal emotions and thoughts are experienced internally, they can ultimately be shared and empathized among humans.

She compiled her paintings and drawings into five published monographs, where she often wrote about the conception behind her own works. In her monograph Phototropism: Sketch and Drawing by Firenze Lai (2009), she discussed about the performativity of human faces. While human faces serve as bridges between an individual to the world, they might also become a barrier as faces may not always accurately express the internal thoughts of a person. Such ambiguity performed through human bodies about them are also conveyed in her artworks. Furthermore, her distorted figures imply an interconnection between one's body and mind, as well as the struggle of getting along with oneself. According to Lai:

"My figure drawings don’t show physically handicapped people. They are about people who behave in a certain way as a result of their thoughts, or about people whose thoughts are altered because of the way they move. These situations could be the result of something impermanent such as our mood, our surroundings or a particular atmosphere. Or they may be long-term effects of inertia, our careers or personalities, or the roles we play in the society. For the sake of survival, we constantly have to balance our mind and body, just like plants tilting towards the sun."

== Works ==
=== Publication ===
- 2019 – Counterbalance, co-published by The Pavilion and Hulahoop, Hong Kong
- 2014 – Day and Daylight: Painting and Drawing by Firenzi Lai, published by Hulahoop, Hong Kong
- 2014 – Phototropism: Sketch and Drawing by Firenze Lai, published by Hulahoop, Hong Kong
- 2009 – The Garden of Roundabouts, published by Hulahoop, Hong Kong
- 2006 – The Citizens - painting + drawing collection, published by Kubrick, Hong Kong

=== Selected co-publication ===
- 2019 – A Circle with Four Corners, artworks by Chan Chui Hung, introductory text by Firenze Lai, published by Hulahoop, Hong Kong
- 2009 – Found Landscape, photographs by Ng Sai-Kit, text by Edwin Lai and Firenze Lai, published by Hulahoop, Hong Kong

== Exhibitions ==
=== Solo exhibitions ===
- 2024 – Plotholes, Lodovico Corsini, Forest, Belgium
- 2019 – Firenze Lai: L’équilibre des blancs (White Balance), MAMC+, Saint-Étienne, France
- 2015 – Turbulence, Mirrored Gardens, Guangzhou, China
- 2014 – Day and Daylight, CL3, Hong Kong Arts Centre, Hong Kong
- 2011 – Absent-minded, Gallery EXIT, Hong Kong
- 2010 – The Garden of Roundabouts, Hulahoop Gallery, Hong Kong
- 2006 – The Citizens, Palace IFC, Hong Kong

=== Selected group exhibitions ===
- 2019 – Contagious Cities: Far Away, Too Close, Tai Kwun Contemporary, Hong Kong
- 2018 – A World in a Grain of Sand, Fosun Foundation, Shanghai
- 2017 – Vive Arte Viva – 57th International Art Exhibition, 5th La Biennale di Venezia, Venice
- 2016 – The World Precedes the Eye, La Salle College of the Arts, Singapore
- 2016 – Hack Space, K11 Art Foundation Pop-up Space, Hong Kong; chi K11 Art Museum, Shanghai 2015 – Mobile M+: Moving Images, Midtown POP, Hong Kong
- 2015 – Surround Audience, New Museum Triennial, New Museum, New York, USA
- 2015 – A Hundred Years of Shame - Songs of Resistance and Scenarios for Chinese Nations, Para Site, Hong Kong
- 2015 – A Journal of the Plague Year. Fear, ghosts, rebels, SARS, Leslie and the Hong Kong Story, Kadist Art Foundation and The Lab, San Francisco, USA
- 2014 – Social Factory - 10th Shanghai Biennale, Power Station of Art, Shanghai, China
- 2014 – A Journal of the Plague Year. Fear, ghosts, rebels, SARS, Leslie and the Hong Kong Story, The Cube Project Space, Taipei, Taiwan; Arko Art Center, Seoul, Korea
- 2013 – A Journal of the Plague Year. Fear, ghosts, rebels, SARS, Leslie and the Hong Kong Story, Para Site, Hong Kong
- 2013 – Disturbance, Gallery Exit, Hong Kong
