= Werner Bräunig =

German writer

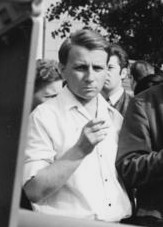
- Bräunig in 1968
- Born: May 12, 1934; Chemnitz, Germany
- Died: August 14, 1976 (aged 42); Halle an der Saale, East Germany
- Occupation: Novelist
- Writing career
- Period: 1957–1974
- Notable work: Rummelplatz ("Fairground")

Werner Bräunig (May 12, 1934 – August 14, 1976) was a German author. He is best known for his posthumously published novel Rummelplatz (German for "Fairground").

The novel was to be part of a Communist Party campaign to establish a new kind of working class literature by encouraging talented labourers to write fiction about their everyday lives. Bräunig started work on his only novel Rummelplatz in 1960. The novel deals with work in the Soviet owned uranium mines of the Wismut AG and covers the time span from the foundation of the GDR in 1949 to the uprising in East Germany on June 17, 1953. Though the novel clearly shows the author's conviction that capitalism always ends up in Fascism and therefore communism is the only chance for mankind, the preprinted chapters of the book were heavily criticized by the 11th plenum of the Central Committee of the Socialist Unity Party of Germany as defaming the working class and the Soviet Union. In contrast to official propaganda, Bräunig portrayed the Wismut miners not as a kind of working-class elite, but as ordinary people struggling to make a living after World War II, spending their spare time in pubs or at the local fairground ("Rummelplatz") and with little interest in politics.

In 2007 the novel was published and nominated for the Leipzig Book Fair Prize. An English translation by Samuel P. Willcocks was published in 2015 by Seagull Books. The 2012 film Barbara was partially inspired by the novel.
