= Sascha Braunig =

Canadian painter (born 1983)

Sascha Braunig (born 1983) is a Canadian painter. She is best known for her hyperrealist and surrealist paintings of lay figures.

== Life and education ==
Braunig was born in Qualicum Beach, British Columbia and lives and works in Portland, Maine.

In 2005, Braunig received a BFA in painting and photography from The Cooper Union. She went on to graduate with her MFA in painting from Yale School of Art in 2008.

== Work ==
While at Yale School of Art, Braunig began experimenting with video. She frequently uses lighting effects and simple materials such as clay or styrofoam to create three-dimensional models or masks, on which she bases the figures in her paintings.

Braunig has received two MacDowell fellowships, in 2013 and 2023, where she worked in Peterborough, New Hampshire.

In 2015 she took part in the New Museum triennial exhibition titled Surround Audience. She has had solo exhibitions at MoMA PS1, New York and at Norway's Kunsthall Stavanger. She was the subject of a midcareer retrospective at the Portland Museum of Art in 2026, titled Wrist Painter, curated by Sayantan Mukhopadhyay. Her work is included in the collection of the National Gallery of Victoria, Melbourne, Australia, among others.

Her inspirations range from contemporary film directors like David Cronenberg to the Flemish painters of the Northern Renaissance, such as Jan van Eyck.

Braunig was included in the 2014 Thames and Hudson book 100 Painters of Tomorrow.
