= Meg Onli =

American curator

- Born: December 12, 1983 (age 42)
- Education: School of the Art Institute of Chicago (BFA); Courtauld Institute of Art (MA)
- Occupations: curator, writer

Meg Onli (born December 12, 1983) is an African-American art curator and writer who has held curatorial roles at the Whitney Museum of American Art and Philadelphia's Institute of Contemporary Art. Her curatorial work primarily revolves around the black experience, language, and constructions of power and space. Her writing has been published in Art21, Daily Serving, and Art Papers. In September 2022, it was announced that Onli would co-curate the 2024 Whitney Biennial with Chrissie Iles.

== Education ==
Meg Onli, was born on December 12, 1983, and raised in Los Angeles, California. She received her Bachelor of Fine Arts with an emphasis in photography and a minor in Art History at School of the Art Institute of Chicago in 2008. She later participated in the AICA Art Writing Workshop in 2012 and received her master's degree in art history from the Courtauld Institute of Art in 2014.

== Early work ==
From 2006 to 2010, Onli was the associate producer of the Chicago-based art and culture podcast and blog "Bad at Sports," an online blog and podcast where writers and artists discuss different contemporary artists, exhibitions, and artworks that shape the present and future of art.

In 2010, Onli founded the "Black Visual Archive" which was a collection of online documents and reviews of contemporary black and post-black visual culture based in Chicago, IL. The archive consisted of articles, reviews, and interviews that surveyed the works of Chicago-based artists such as Kerry James Marshall, Theaster Gates, etc., and hosted a collection of writings that discussed the work of black artists and cultural workers throughout history.

Onli later served as the Program Coordinator at the Graham Foundation for Advanced Studies in the Fine Arts located in Chicago, IL. At the Graham Foundation, she assisted in the showcasing of the “Architecture of Independence: African Modernism” at the Graham Foundation space. Originated by the Vitra Design Museum and curated by Manuel Herz, "Architecture of Independence: African Modernism” was an exploration of the complex history and legacy of modernist architecture in sub-Saharan Africa during the 1960s and 1970s. At the Graham Foundation, Onli also assisted in the showcasing of the first “Barbara Kasten: Stages” project installation (2016–2017). Originated and curated by Curator Alex Klein, the “Barbara Kasten: Stages” project exhibition showcased Barbara Kasten's five-decade engagement with abstraction, light, and architectural form.

== Contributions to Philadelphia’s Institute of Contemporary Art ==
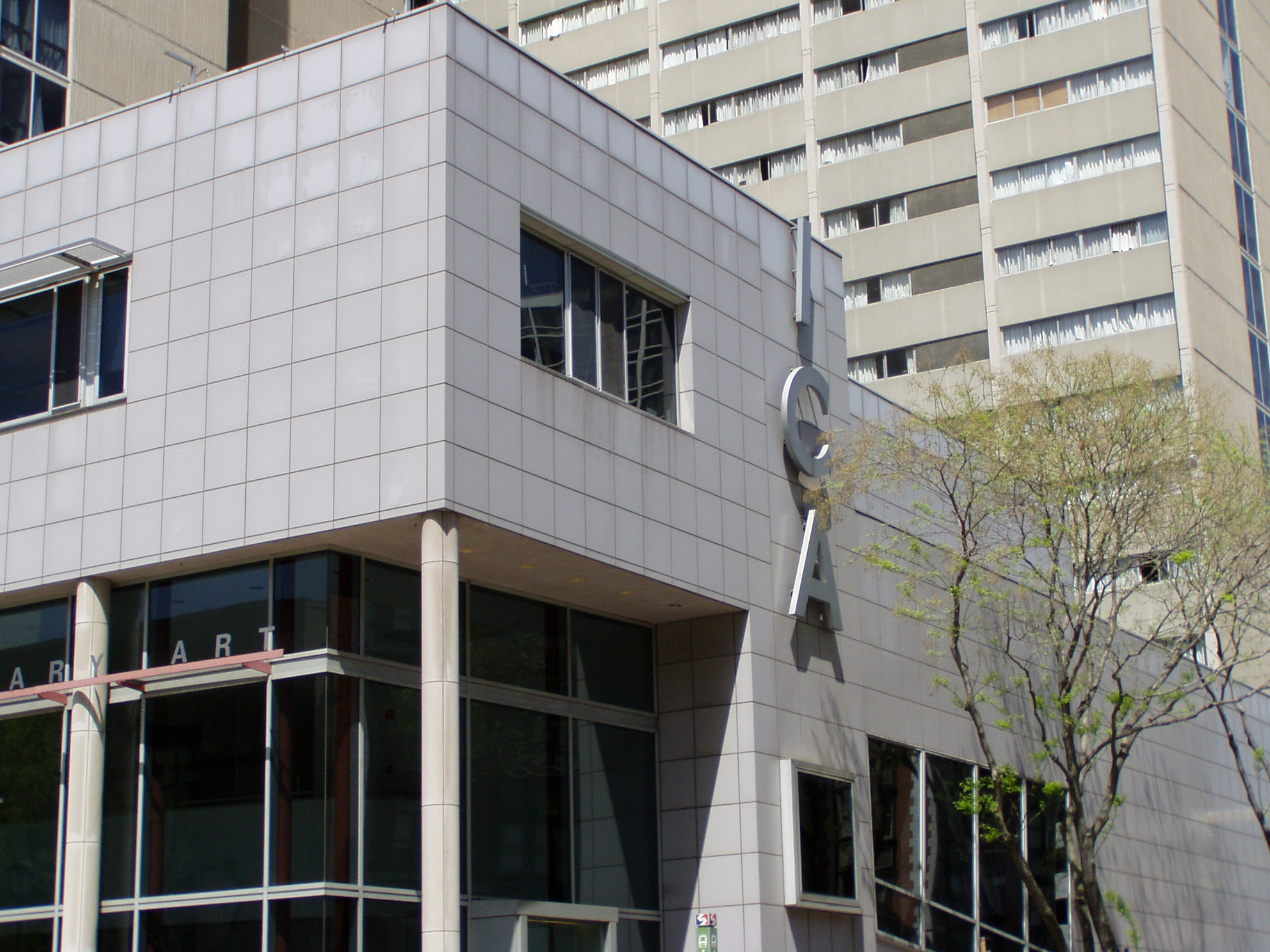
Institute of Contemporary Art in Philadelphia

Onli is currently serving as Andrea B. Laporte Associate Curator at the Institute of Contemporary Art in Philadelphia. She is the first black woman to serve as curator at Philadelphia's Institute of Contemporary Art. Exhibitions she curated include “Speech/Acts” (2017) and all three chapters of “Colored People Time: Mundane Futures, Quotidian Pasts, and Banal Presents” (2019).

=== “Speech/Acts” (2017) ===
“Speech/Acts” (2017) was an exhibition program series that explored how the social and cultural constructs of language have shaped black experiences. Consisting of poetry and visual works, the exhibit showcased new and recent artworks from emerging artists Jibade-Khalil Hu man, Steffani Jemison, Tony Lewis, Tiona Nekkia McClodden, Kameelah Janan Rasheed, and Martine Syms. “Speech/Acts” (2017) also hosted special programs and reading room spotlighting writings of poets Claudia Rankine, Morgan Parker, and Simone White, among others. The Speech/Acts reading group met over six Saturday afternoons in the fall discussing listed syllabus texts and exploring what the writings illuminated and provoked. In addition to the exhibition, a fully illustrated catalog, co-published with Futurepoem, was released featuring reprints of seminal texts by Fred Moten and Harryette Mullen, newly commissioned poetry by Morgan Parker and Simone White, and an essay by Meg Onli.

=== “Colored People Time: Mundane Futures, Quotidian Pasts, and Banal Presents” (2019) ===
“Colored People Time: Mundane Futures, Quotidian Pasts, and Banal Presents” (2019) was a three-chapter series that explored the impact of colonialism and slavery on blackness in the past, present and the future. The series of exhibitions featured works by Martine Syms, Cameron Rowland, Carolyn Lazard, Sable Elyse Smith, Kevin Jerome Everson, Dave McKenzie, Aria Dean, Matthew Angelo Harrison, with historical texts from the Black Panther Party, Sutton E. Griggs, and the University of Pennsylvania Museum of Archaeology and Anthropology.

“Colored People Time” (2019) was staged in three consecutive exhibitions. The first installment titled “Mundane Futures” featuring installations by Martine Syms whose work focused the subject of black futures as one inevitably tied the past of slavery and colonialism. In the second presentation, “Quotidian Pasts,” artist Matthew Angelo Harrison collaborated with both the University of Pennsylvania Museum of Archaeology and Anthropology and Monique Renee Scott, a specialist in the display of artifacts from the African diaspora, to stage an exhibition addressing the complexities of collecting and displaying objects acquired by way of colonialism. The final exhibition, “Banal Presents,” showcased the work of Sable Elyse Smith, Cameron Rowland, and Carolyn Lazard, interpreting how the ideas from the previous two installations exist within the present moment. A publication features written responses to the exhibition, along with a republishing of Syms’ Manifesto.

Onli left her position at ICA Philadelphia in October 2021 to join Underground Museum in Los Angeles as director and curator. Onli served in that capacity until March 2022 when the museum closed.

== Whitney Museum of American Art ==
Following Onli's departure from Underground Museum, it was announced that she would co-curate the 2024 Whitney Biennial with Chrissie Iles. In June 2023, Onli joined the Whitney as Curator-At-Large and it was announced she'd be a curator for the museum's forthcoming Roy Lichtenstein show in 2026. In November 2024, Onli was appointed as the Nancy and Fred Poses Curator where she will lead the painting and sculpture acquisition committee and contribute to curatorial projects.

== Recognition ==
Onli has received the following fellowships and awards:

- Art Writers Grant from the Creative Capital and Warhol Foundation (2013)
- Graham Foundation Individual Research Grant from the Graham Foundation (2014)
- Transformation Award from the Leeway Foundation (2018)
- Curatorial Fellowship from the Warhol Foundation (2018)
- Figure Skating Prize (2021)
