= Vielmetter Los Angeles =

Contemporary art gallery in Los Angeles, California

Coordinates: 34.02435°N 118.22968°W

Vielmetter Los Angeles (formerly Susanne Vielmetter Los Angeles Projects) is a contemporary art gallery founded in 2000 by Susanne Vielmetter. The gallery is located in downtown Los Angeles.

== History ==
Susanne Vielmetter launched her first gallery in 2000 on Wilshire Boulevard in Los Angeles, CA, before moving to a larger 7,500 square foot gallery in Culver City in 2010. In 2019, the gallery moved to its current 24,000 square foot location in downtown Los Angeles. Between 2007 and 2009, the gallery maintained a second branch in Germany, Susanne Vielmetter Berlin Projects.

In an interview conducted in September 2018 by Audrey Rose Smith for The Armory Show, Susanne Vielmetter was described as "a stalwart of the Los Angeles art scene" and the gallery's roster of artists is regarded as “very balanced between male and female artists."

== Artists ==
Artists represented by the gallery include:

- Edgar Arceneaux
- My Barbarian
- Sadie Benning
- Ellen Berkenblit
- Andrea Bowers
- Sarah Cain
- Kim Dingle
- Sean Duffy
- Nicole Eisenman
- Genevieve Gaignard
- Nash Glynn
- Liz Glynn
- Karl Haendel
- Stanya Kahn
- Hayv Kahraman
- Mary Kelly (artist)
- Forrest Kirk
- Shana Lutker
- Hugo McCloud
- Dave McKenzie
- Rodney McMillian
- Paul Mpagi Sepuya
- Wangechi Mutu
- Elizabeth Neel
- Ruben Ochoa
- Pope.L
- Mary Reid Kelley
- Amy Sillman
- April Street
- Mickalene Thomas
- Tam Van Tran

Past Artists:

- Angel Otero
