= Noah Davis (painter) =

American artist (1983–2015)

- Born: June 3, 1983; Seattle, Washington, U.S.
- Died: August 29, 2015 (aged 32); Ojai, California, U.S.
- Education: Cooper Union
- Years active: 2000–2015
- Known for: Painting; Installation art
- Notable work: Painting for My Dad (2011); Seventy Works (36) (2014)
- Spouse: Karon Davis (m. 2008)
- Children: 1
- Parents: Keven Davis (1958-2011) (father); Faith Childs-Davis (mother)
- Relatives: Kahlil Joseph (brother); Ben Vereen (father-in-law)

Noah Davis (June 3, 1983 – August 29, 2015), was an American painter and installation artist. In 2012, Davis and his wife, sculptor Karon Om Vereen–Davis, founded the Underground Museum in Los Angeles. When talking about his work, Davis said, "If I’m making any statement, it’s to just show black people in normal scenarios, where drugs and guns are nothing to do with it," and described his work as "instances where black aesthetics and modernist aesthetics collide." Davis died at his home in Ojai, California, on August 29, 2015, of a rare form of soft tissue cancer.

== Early life ==
Noah Davis was born on June 3, 1983, in Seattle, Washington. Davis was the youngest son of Keven Davis, an entertainment and sports lawyer who represented Serena Williams, Venus Williams and others, and Faith Childs-Davis, an artist, writer, and non-profit leader. His older brother, Kahlil Joseph, is a filmmaker and video artist who has also shown work at the Museum of Contemporary Art (MOCA).

== Beginnings and education ==
Davis started painting in his early teenage years, and was so serious about his work that, according to his brother Kahlil, he had his own studio by the time he was just 17 years old. He went on to study painting at the Cooper Union School of Art in New York City from 2001 to 2004, though he did not graduate. By 2004 he had moved to Los Angeles, and began working at the bookstore at MOCA. He exhibited his paintings as early as 2007, in group exhibitions and solo gallery shows in Los Angeles, New York and elsewhere followed. It was during this time that he began to establish and build a reputation for his work. After having his work featured in a group show curated by Lindsay Charlwood in 2007, Davis gained the attention of Culver City gallery owner Bennett Roberts, of Roberts & Tilton. He would go on to be represented by Roberts for the next 5 years. Over the years, Davis would have his work shown in the Rubell Museum, Nasher Museum of Art, the Museum of Contemporary Art, Los Angeles, the Santa Barbara Museum of Art, and the Los Angeles County Museum of Art.

== Career ==
The Seven Prisoners of the Abyss (2008) at the Rubell Museum DC in 2022

Davis became known for his melancholic portrayals of blurred black figures against barren or shadowy landscapes – paintings that often teetered dangerously into the unreal. During his life he made approximately four hundred paintings, collages, and sculptures. His paintings are both figurative and abstract, realistic and dreamlike; they are about blackness and the history of Western painting, drawn from photographs and from life; they are energetic and mournful in their palette. "He paints what he sees and thinks, expressing the dynamics of his subject with great dignity and simplicity." Davis had advanced compositions that rendered as three-dimensional but remained flat. He was influenced by European painters Marlene Dumas and Luc Tuymans, as well as American painters such as Mark Rothko and Fairfield Porter.

== Underground Museum ==
In 2012, he founded the Underground Museum with his wife, the sculptor Karon Davis, in Arlington Heights, a historically working-class African-American and Latino neighborhood in Los Angeles. The Underground Museum is an artist-run, experimental exhibition space made up of a series of interconnected storefronts in Arlington Heights, CA. Davis' original idea behind the space was to "sidestep the gallery system, preferring to bring museum-quality art to a community that had no access to it 'within walking distance,' as he once put it." After Davis' passing his brother Kahlil Joseph and his sister-in-law, the film producer Onye Anyanwu, joined as founding board members. The Underground Museum is a cultural hub. John Legend and Solange Knowles launched albums there; Barry Jenkins, the director of "Moonlight" and Raoul Peck, the director of the James Baldwin documentary "I Am Not Your Negro" screened their films. By the time of his death in 2015, Davis had created a special partnership with MOCA in which the museum agreed to loan the Underground Museum works from its permanent collection for a series of shows. Davis himself curated the first one, and left behind plans for 18 others. Artists exhibited throughout the institution's history include Rodney McMillian, Lorna Simpson, Roy DeCarava, April Street, Deana Lawson, William Kentridge.

The museum was closed for nearly two years due to the COVID-19 lockdowns and reopened in January 2022 under the newly appointed co-directorship of curator Meg Onli and executive Cristina Pacheco. The final exhibition in the Underground Museum was a solo retrospective of Davis's paintings. The museum closed again in March 2022 under unclear circumstances with the departures of both Onli and Pacheco. In a letter to supporters of the museum, posted to social media and the museum's website, Karon Davis wrote that she and her family had been "not able to fully grieve [Noah's] loss privately," and noted "how hard it has been for our family to let go enough to allow Meg and Cristina to do their jobs." The museum has not announced any long-term plans to reopen.

== Exhibitions ==
Davis staged a number of solo shows during his lifetime at galleries and museums in the United States. His notable solo shows include Noah Davis: Nobody (2008), Roberts & Tilton, Los Angeles; Noah Davis: The Forgotten Works (2010), Roberts & Tilton, Los Angeles; Savage Wilds (2012), James Harris Gallery, Seattle; The Missing Link (2013), Roberts & Tilton, Los Angeles; and Garden City (2014), Papillion Gallery, Los Angeles.

Following his death, Davis' work has been the subject of several posthumous solo shows and has been included in several high-profile group shows. The Frye Art Museum, Seattle, organized Young Blood (2016), an exhibition exploring the work of Davis, his brother Kahlil Joseph, and the Underground Museum; David Zwirner Gallery, New York, staged a career retrospective in 2020 curated by Helen Molesworth; and a suite of Davis' paintings were included in The Milk of Dreams (2022) at the 59th Venice Biennale. Molesworth curated a second retrospective of Davis' work in 2022 for the Underground Museum with Justen Leroy, but the show ended several months early with the unexpected closure of the museum in March 2022.

A retrospective, Noah Davis, presenting over 50 of Davis’ works in painting, sculpture, curating and community-building, was initiated by Barbican, London and DAS MINSK, Potsdam where it was on display September 7, 2024 – January 5, 2025. The exhibition was on display at the Barbican Art Gallery February 6, 2025 — May 11, 2025, and the Hammer Museum, Los Angeles from June 8 to August 31, 2025. This retrospective will be on view at the Philadelphia Museum of Art in Philadelphia, PA from January 24, 2026 - April 26, 2026.

== Notable works in public collections ==
- American Sterile (2008), Rubell Museum, Miami/Washington, D.C.
- Black Wall Street (2008), Studio Museum in Harlem, New York
- Black Widow with Brothers Fighting (2008), Nasher Museum of Art, Durham, North Carolina
- The Messenger (2008), San Francisco Museum of Modern Art
- The Seven Prisoners of the Abyss (2008), Rubell Museum, Miami/Washington, D.C.
- The Gardener (2009), Studio Museum in Harlem, New York
- I Own a Morandi (2009), Museum of Contemporary Art, Los Angeles
- The Year of the Coxswain (2009), Studio Museum in Harlem, New York
- All Those Lost to Oh Well (2010), Museum of Contemporary Art, Los Angeles
- inBoil and Margaret (2010), Santa Barbara Museum of Art, California
- The Missing Link 4 (2014), Los Angeles County Museum of Art
- Pueblo del Rio: Public Art Sculpture (2014), Hammer Museum, Los Angeles
- Carlos' World (2014-2015), Whitney Museum, New York
- The "Fitz" (2015), Museum of Contemporary Art, Los Angeles
- Untitled (2015), Museum of Modern Art, New York
