= Ben Vereen =

American actor, dancer, and singer (born 1946)

- Vereen in 2026
- Born: Benjamin Augustus Middleton; October 10, 1946 (age 80); Laurinburg, North Carolina U.S.
- Occupations: Actor; dancer; singer; voice actor
- Years active: 1965–present
- Spouse(s): Andrea Townsley (m. 1966; div. 1974) Nancy Bruner (m. 1976; div. 2012)
- Children: 6, including Karon Davis
- Relatives: Noah Davis (son-in-law)
- Website: www.therealbenvereen.com

Benjamin Augustus Vereen (né Middleton; October 10, 1946) is an American actor, dancer, and singer. He gained prominence for his performances in the original Broadway productions of the musicals Jesus Christ Superstar, for which he received a Tony Award nomination, and Pippin, for which he won the 1973 Tony Award for Best Actor in a Musical.

== Early life ==
Vereen was born October 10, 1946, in Laurinburg, North Carolina. Shortly after his birth, he and his family relocated to the Bedford-Stuyvesant neighborhood in Brooklyn, New York City. He was raised by James Vereen, a paint-factory worker, and Pauline Vereen, who worked as a maid and theatre wardrobe mistress. He was raised Pentecostal. He discovered he was adopted when he applied for a passport at age 25. According to the Vereens, his birth mother had abandoned him, although he later heard from relatives that his birth mother looked for him for years.

During his pre-teen years, he exhibited an innate talent for drama and dance and often performed in local variety shows. At the age of 14, Vereen enrolled at the High School of Performing Arts, where he studied under world-renowned choreographers Martha Graham, George Balanchine, and Jerome Robbins. Upon his graduation, he struggled to find suitable stage work and was often forced to take odd jobs to supplement his income.

== Career ==
=== Stage ===
When Vereen was 18 years old, he made his New York stage bow off-off Broadway in The Prodigal Son at the Greenwich Mews Theater directed by Stella Holt. By the following year, he was in Las Vegas, performing in Bob Fosse's production of Sweet Charity, a show with which he toured in 1967–68. He returned to New York City to play Claude in Hair in the Broadway production, before joining the national touring company.

The following year, he was cast as an ensemble dancer in the film adaptation of Sweet Charity. He is featured prominently in the "Rich Man's Frug" dance number and the song "Rhythm of Life", where he appears as one of three backup dancers for Sammy Davis Jr. After developing a rapport with Davis, Vereen was cast as his understudy in the upcoming production of Golden Boy, which toured England and ended the run at the Palladium Theatre in London's West End.

Vereen was nominated for a Tony Award for his role as Judas Iscariot in Jesus Christ Superstar in 1972 and won a Tony for his appearance in Pippin in 1973. Vereen appeared in the Broadway musical Wicked as the Wizard of Oz in 2005. Vereen has also performed in one-man shows and actively lectures on black history and inspirational topics.

In August 2011, Vereen was named co-artistic director of Tampa's Broadway Theatre Project.

=== Television ===
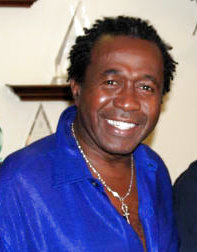
Vereen in 2007

Vereen has also starred in numerous television programs, and is well known for the role of 'Chicken' George Moore in Alex Haley's landmark TV miniseries Roots, for which he received an Emmy nomination in 1977.

Vereen's four-week summer variety series, Ben Vereen ... Comin' At Ya, aired on NBC in August 1975 and featured regulars Lola Falana, Avery Schreiber, and Liz Torres.

In 1976, Vereen appeared as a guest star on the first season of The Muppet Show, singing two songs.

In 1978, on a Boston Pops TV special, Vereen performed a tribute to Bert Williams, complete with period makeup and attire, and reprising Williams' high-kick dance steps, to Vaudeville standards such as "Waitin' for the Robert E. Lee".

In 1981, Vereen performed at Ronald Reagan's first inauguration. The performance generated controversy as Vereen performed the first part of the show in blackface. Before the finale, ABC cut the live performance, generating confusion and anger from viewers at home. According to video artist Edgar Arcenaux, what TV viewers did not see was the second part of the performance, in which Vereen mimicked being refused service because of his color while trying to buy the Republican elite a congratulatory drink. As Arceneaux explains, Vereen's performance was meant as a critique of Republican civil rights policies, but the TV audience did not get to see it.

Vereen was cast opposite Jeff Goldblum in the short-lived detective series Tenspeed and Brown Shoe (1980). During the late 1980s and early 1990s, Vereen worked steadily on television with projects ranging from the sitcom Webster to the drama Silk Stalkings.

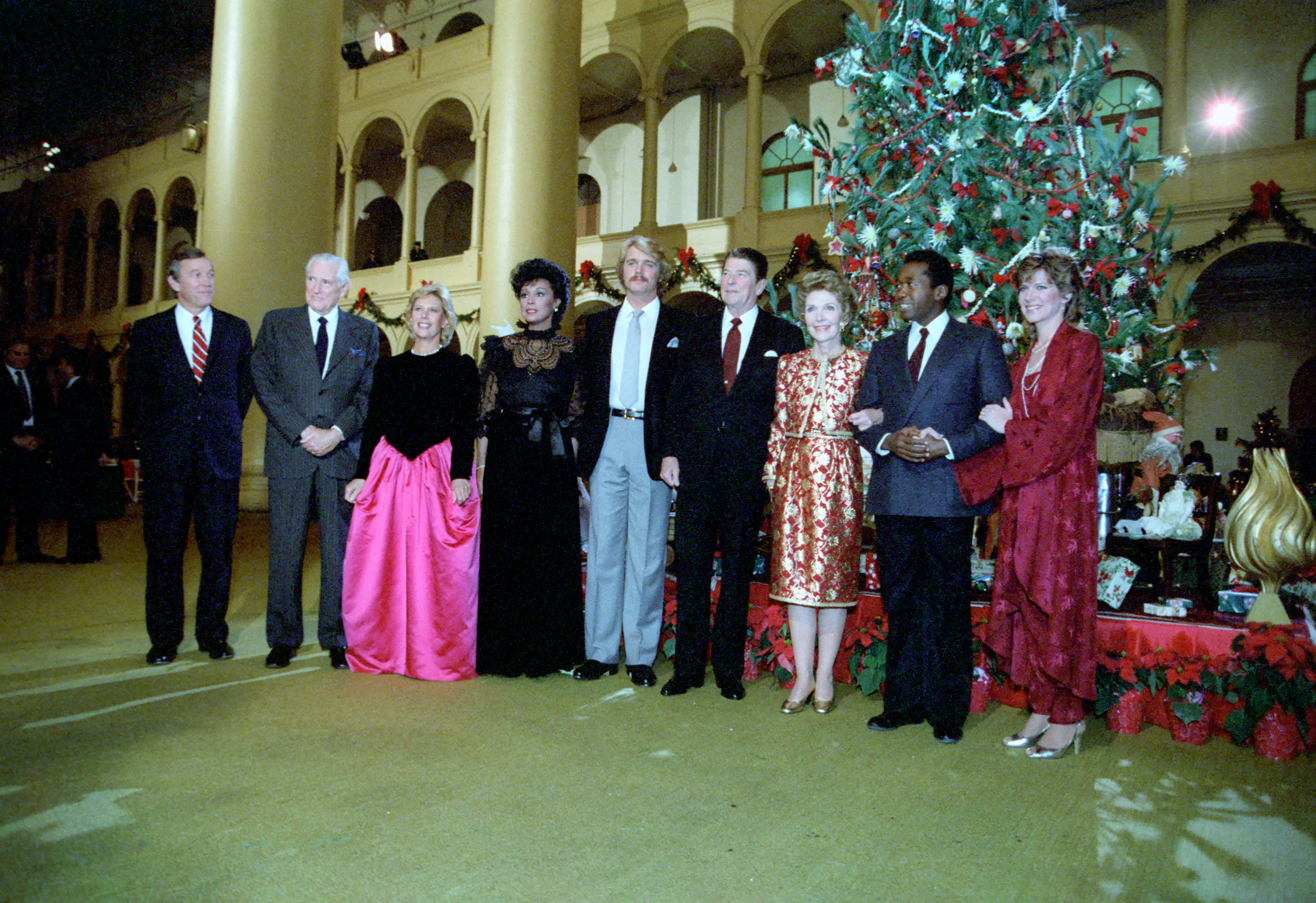
U.S. President Ronald Reagan and First Lady Nancy Reagan with a group at NBC's taping of its "Christmas in Washington" special in the Pension Building in Washington, D.C. Left to right: NBC News anchor Roger Mudd, CBS News reporter Eric Sevareid, Dinah Shore, actress Diahann Carroll, actor and musician John Schneider, President Ronald Reagan, First Lady Nancy Reagan, actor Ben Vereen, and entertainer Debby Boone.

In 1985, Vereen starred in the Faerie Tale Theatre series as Puss in Boots alongside Gregory Hines. He appeared on The Fresh Prince of Bel-Air episode "Papa's Got a Brand New Excuse", in which he played Will Smith's biological father Lou Smith. He made several appearances on the 1980s sitcom Webster as the title character's biological uncle.

He also appeared as Mayor Ben (a leopard) on the children's program Zoobilee Zoo and as Itsy Bitsy Spider in Mother Goose Rock 'n' Rhyme. In 1993, he appeared in the Star Trek: The Next Generation episode "Interface" as the father of Roots co-star LeVar Burton's character Geordi La Forge; fellow Roots star Madge Sinclair appeared in the same episode as Geordi's mother. He also appeared on the television series The Nanny episode "Pishke Business". In 2010, he appeared on the television series How I Met Your Mother episodes "Cleaning House" and "False Positive" as Sam Gibbs, the long lost father of James Stinson, Barney Stinson's brother. He returned in 2013 and 2014 for another two episodes.

== Personal life ==
=== Wives, children, and extended family ===
Vereen has six children. His 16-year-old daughter, Naja, was killed in a car crash in 1987 on the New Jersey Turnpike when a truck overturned on her car. His other daughter, Karon Davis, is a professional artist; Vereen's son-in-law was Davis' late husband, artist Noah Davis. His son, Ben Vereen Jr., died in 2020 at the age of 55.

Vereen is the godfather of R&B singer Usher, and is also the first cousin once removed of former NFL running back Shane Vereen.

In the early 1980s, Vereen moved with his family to Saddle River, New Jersey.

In September 2012, Vereen filed for divorce from his wife of 36 years, Nancy Bruner Vereen, citing irreconcilable differences.

=== Health ===
In 1992, Vereen suffered three accidents in one day: His car hit a tree, causing him to hit his head on the roof of the car; he then suffered a stroke while he was walking on a Malibu highway, apparently veering into the road; and finally, as a result of that, he was hit by record producer David Foster, who was driving his car on the highway. His critical injuries, including a broken leg, required him to undergo arduous physical rehabilitation in the ensuing months.

In 2007, he was diagnosed with type 2 diabetes and he has a website in which he shares his personal story along with advice from medical experts.

=== Adoption ===
According to The Fayetteville Observer of April 29, 2006, Vereen learned while applying for a passport in the late 1960s that he was adopted. His birth certificate revealed that his birth name was Benjamin Augustus Middleton, that he was the son of Essie Middleton, and that he was born in Laurinburg, North Carolina. In April 2006, Vereen visited Scotland County with a genealogist on a search for family members and learned that his mother's name was Essie May Pearson. The Laurinburg Exchange reported: "Vereen, an adoptee who learned that he was born in Laurinburg and made a celebrated trip to Scotland County in 2006 to reconnect with family. While on the trip he learned his mother had died 24 years before, but that several relatives still lived in the area." According to her acquaintances, Essie had gone on a trip when Vereen was a child and had left her baby in someone's care. When she returned, the child was gone. In the April 28, 2006, interview with the 'Laurinburg Exchange', Vereen said that his visit "has just all been so overwhelming ... I've finally found my family". In May 2006, he met his mother's daughter (his sister), Gloria Lewis-Walker, of Derby, Connecticut.

=== Public speaking and politics ===
Vereen has appeared as a public speaker and humanitarian speaking on such topics as black history, overcoming adversity, and the importance of continuing education. Vereen was the keynote speaker for the Boys & Girls Clubs in St. Petersburg, Florida, annual alumni tribute gala held in October 2007.

He is an active Democrat.

== Sexual harassment allegations ==
In January 2018, four actresses in a Florida production of Hair directed by Vereen in 2015 alleged that he sexually harassed them throughout the production.

According to the New York Daily News, "the women — part of the Venice Theatre production outside of Tampa — say Vereen forced unwanted kisses, hugged them aggressively, stripped naked during an acting exercise and made degrading comments about their weight, sex appeal and personal lives". The Daily News published cast members' claims that he used his position of authority as a director and mentor to pressure them to engage him in unwanted sexual interactions. For example, two of the actresses said he privately lured them on separate occasions to his Florida rental home. One woman willingly admits she and Vereen began a relationship, though she feels it was ultimately coerced; the other says he sexually molested her and later non-consensually kissed her and made sexually disparaging remarks.

According to Variety, "While directing the 2015 production of the musical at the Venice Theatre in Florida, Vereen is alleged to have invited female cast members back to his apartment and goaded them into sex acts. He's also accused of inappropriate talk and conduct during rehearsals that involved cast members stripping naked, ostensibly as preparation for a show that has, since its original 1967 production, been associated with a famous, full-cast nude scene."

Vereen has since apologized for his misconduct in 2018.

== Filmography ==
=== Film ===
| Year | Title | Role | Notes |
|---|---|---|---|
| 1969 | Sweet Charity | Dancer | |
| 1970 | Gas-s-s-s | Carlos | |
| 1975 | Funny Lady | Bert Robbins | |
| 1979 | All That Jazz | O'Connor Flood | |
| 1980 | This Boxer Wears a Shirt | | |
| 1982 | Cycling Through China | Himself | Documentary |
| 1982 | Sabine | Stanley | |
| 1985 | The Zoo Gang | The Winch | |
| 1988 | Buy & Cell | Shaka | |
| 1993 | Once Upon a Forest | Phineas (voice) | |
| 1998 | Why Do Fools Fall in Love | Richard Barrett | |
| 1999 | I'll Take You There | Mr. Gwin | |
| 2001 | The Painting | Whistlin' Willie Weston | |
| 2006 | Idlewild | Percy Senior | |
| 2007 | And Then Came Love | Chuck Cooper | |
| 2009 | Tapioca | Nuts | |
| 2009 | 21 and a Wake-Up | General Garner | |
| 2011 | Mama, I Want to Sing! | Horace Payne | |
| 2013 | Khumba | Mkhulu, the Elder Zebra (voice) | |
| 2014 | Top Five | Carl | |
| 2014 | Time Out of Mind | Dixon | |

=== Television ===
| Year | Title | Role | Notes |
|---|---|---|---|
| 1975 | Ben Vereen... Comin' at Ya | Host | 4 episodes |
| 1976 | Louis Armstrong – Chicago Style | Louis Armstrong | Television movie |
| 1976 | The Muppet Show | Special Guest Star | Episode: "Ben Vereen" |
| 1977 | Roots | Chicken George Moore | 3 episodes |
| 1977 | The Carol Burnett Show | Self | 2 episodes |
| 1980 | Tenspeed and Brown Shoe | E.L. 'Tenspeed' Turner | 14 episodes |
| 1981 | Pippin: His Life and Times | The Leading Player | Television movie |
| 1982–84 | The Love Boat | Various roles | 3 episodes |
| 1983 | The Charmkins | Dragonweed | Voice; television short |
| 1983 | Webster | Himself | Episode: "That's Entertainment" |
| 1983–85 | Webster | Uncle Philip Long | 11 episodes |
| 1983 | SCTV | Himself | Episode: "Bobby Bittman's Retirement" |
| 1984 | The Jesse Owens Story | Herb Douglas | Television movie |
| 1984 | Ellis Island | Roscoe Haines | 3 episodes |
| 1985 | A.D. | Ethiopian | 5 part miniseries |
| 1985 | Lost in London | Paul Williams | Television movie |
| 1985 | Faerie Tale Theatre | Puss in Boots | Episode: "Puss in Boots" |
| 1986–87 | Zoobilee Zoo | Mayor Ben | 62 episodes |
| 1988 | Jenny's Song | Joe | Television movie |
| 1988 | J.J. Starbuck | E.L. "Tenspeed" Turner | 5 episodes |
| 1990 | The Kid Who Loved Christmas | Performer | Television movie |
| 1990 | Mother Goose Rock 'n' Rhyme | Itsy Bitsy Spider | Television movie |
| 1990 | Booker | Carl McQueen | Episode: "The Life and Death of Chick Sterling" |
| 1991–93 | Silk Stalkings | Capt. Ben Hutchinson | 11 episodes |
| 1992 | Intruders | Gene Randall | 2 episodes |
| 1993 | Star Trek: The Next Generation | Dr. Edward LaForge | Episode: "Interface" |
| 1994 | Lois and Clark: The New Adventures of Superman | Dr. Andre Novak | Episode: "Illusions of Grandeur" |
| 1994 | The Fresh Prince of Bel-Air | Lou Smith | Episode: "Papa's Got a Brand New Excuse" |
| 1994 | The Nanny | Himself | Episode: "Pishke Business" |
| 1995 | New York Undercover | Louie | Episode: "Eliminate the Middleman" |
| 1996 | Touched by an Angel | Ulysses Dodd | Episode: "Secret Service" |
| 1997 | Second Noah | Sweet Billy | Episode: "Desperately Seeking Mickey" |
| 1998 | Soldier of Fortune, Inc. | Senator Stanford Parks | Episode: "Party Girl" |
| 1999 | Promised Land | Lawrence Taggert Sr. | 3 episodes |
| 1999 | The Jamie Foxx Show | Royal | Episode: "Taps for Royal" |
| 2001 | The Feast of All Saints | Rudolphe Lermontant | Television movie |
| 2002 | Oz | A.R. Whitworth | Episode: "Good Intentions" |
| 2007 | Grey's Anatomy | Archie Roche | Episode: "Love/Addiction" |
| 2007 | Law & Order: Criminal Intent | Rev. Jeremiah Morris | Episode: "Senseless" |
| 2008 | Accidental Friendship | Wes | Television movie |
| 2008 | Your Mama Don't Dance | Judge | 8 episodes |
| 2010 | House of Payne | Clarence Sanderson | Episode: "Curtis Sings the Blues |
| 2010–14 | How I Met Your Mother | Sam Gibbs | 4 episodes |
| 2011 | Broadway: The Next Generation | Himself | Documentary series |
| 2014 | Love That Girl! | Judge | Episode: "Business is Business" |
| 2013 | NCIS | Lamar Addison | Episode: "Homesick" |
| 2015 | Hot in Cleveland | Mayor of Cleveland | Episode: "Out of Our Minds" |
| 2016 | The Rocky Horror Picture Show: Let's Do the Time Warp Again | Dr. Everett von Scott | Television special |
| 2017 | Making History | Dr. Theodore Anthony Cobell | 3 episodes |
| 2017–18 | Sneaky Pete | Porter | 6 episodes |
| 2018 | Magnum P.I. | Henry Barr | Episode: "Death Is Only Temporary" |
| 2018–19 | Star | Calvin | 5 episodes |
| 2019 | Bull | Willie Lambert | Episode: "Forfeiture" |
| 2019 | Tales | Harry | Episode: "My Life" |
| 2021 | The Good Fight | Frederick Douglass | 3 episodes |
| 2021–22 | B Positive | Peter Morgan | Recurring role; 12 episodes |

== Theatre ==
| Year | Production | Role | Venue | Notes |
|---|---|---|---|---|
| 1965 | The Prodigal Son | Dancer | Greenwich Mews Theater, Off-Broadway | |
| 1967–68 | Sweet Charity | Dancer | US & Canada Tour | |
| 1968–72 | Hair | Hud, Claude, Berger, Indian | Biltmore Theatre, Broadway; National Tour; Aquarius Theatre, Los Angeles | |
| 1968 | Golden Boy | Joe Wellington | London Palladium; International Tour | Understudy to Sammy Davis Jr. |
| 1970 | Gurton's Apocalyptic Needle | Alternate roles | The New Troupe/Touring | |
| 1970 | Don't Call Me Toby | Singer/Dancer | The New Troupe, Touring | |
| 1970–71 | No Place to Be Somebody | Alternate roles | Touring Company | |
| 1971–73 | Jesus Christ Superstar | Judas Iscariot | Mark Hellinger Theatre, Broadway | |
| 1972–74 | Pippin | Leading Player | Imperial Theater, Broadway, U.S. tour | |
| 1985 | Grind | LeRoy | Mark Hellinger Theatre, Broadway | |
| 1986 | Pippin | Leading Player | U.S. tour | |
| 1992–93 | Jelly's Last Jam | Chimney Man | Shubert Theater, Broadway | Replacement |
| 1995–96 | A Christmas Carol | Ghost of Christmas Present | Madison Square Garden, Broadway | |
| 1999 | Chicago | Billy Flynn | U.S. & Canada Tour | |
| 2001 | Fosse | Performer | Shubert Theater, Broadway | Replacement |
| 2002 | I'm Not Rappaport | Midge | Shubert Theater, Broadway; U.S. National tour | |
| 2003 | The Exonerated | Performer | Off-Broadway | |
| 2004 | Fosse | Performer | European tour | |
| 2005–06 | Wicked | The Wizard of Oz | Gershwin Theatre, Broadway; Nederlander Thatre, Chicago | Replacement |
| 2010 | Fetch Clay, Make Man | Lincoln Perry | McCarter Theatre, Princeton | |

== Discography ==
=== Solo albums ===
- Off-Stage (Buddah Records, 1975)
- Ben Vereen (Buddah Records, 1976)
- Signed, Sealed, Delivered! (51 West, 1979)
- Here I Am (Accord, 1982)
- Steppin' Out Live (Ghostlight Records, 2010)

=== Ensemble albums ===
- Grind (Original Cast Recording) (TER, 1985)
- Pippin (Original Broadway Cast) (Decca Broadway, 2000)

=== Singles and EPs ===
- Superstar (MCA Records, 1971)
- Could We Start Again Please? / Heaven On Their Minds (Decca, 1972)
- Stop Your Half-Steppin' Ma Ma (Buddah Records, 1975)
- By Your Side (Buddah Records, 1975)
- Got It Made / Read Between the Lines (Ariola, 1980)

== Awards and nominations ==
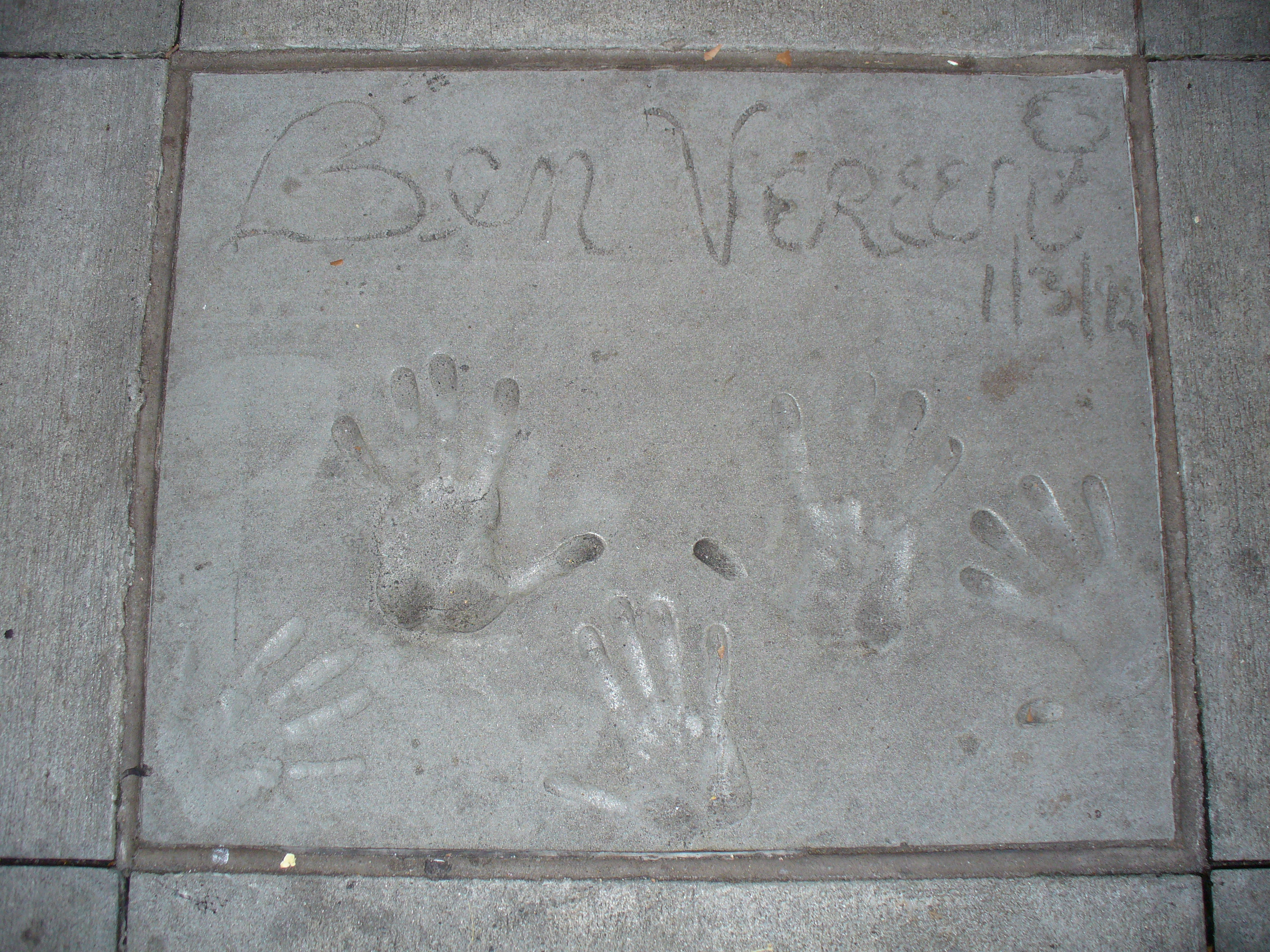
The handprints of Ben Vereen in front of Theater of the Stars at Walt Disney World's Disney's Hollywood Studios theme park

Theater

| Year | Award | Category | Title | Results |
|---|---|---|---|---|
| 1972 | Tony Award | Best Featured Actor in a Musical | Jesus Christ Superstar | Nominated |
| 1972 | Theatre World Award | —N/a | Jesus Christ Superstar | Won |
| 1973 | Drama Desk Award | Outstanding Performance | Pippin | Won |
| 1973 | Tony Award | Best Actor in a Musical | Pippin | Won |
| 2006 | Broadway.com Audience Award | Favorite Male Replacement | Wicked | Won |

Television

| Year | Award | Category | Title | Results |
|---|---|---|---|---|
| 1976 | Golden Globe Award | New Star of the Year – Actor | Funny Lady | Nominated |
| 1977 | Television Critics Circle Award | Lead Actor | Roots | Won |
| 1977 | Primetime Emmy Award | Outstanding Supporting Actor in Variety or Music | The Bell Telephone Jubilee | Nominated |
| 1977 | Primetime Emmy Award | Outstanding Lead Actor Drama or Comedy Series | Roots | Nominated |
| 1984 | Golden Globe Award | Best Supporting Actor – Television | Ellis Island | Nominated |
| 1992 | Primetime Emmy Award | Outstanding Supporting Actor in a Miniseries | Intruders | Nominated |

=== Honors ===
The Community Mental Health Council awarded Vereen with their 2004 Lifeline Celebration Achievement Award. For his humanitarian contributions, he has received a number of awards including Israel's Cultural and Humanitarian Awards, three NAACP Image Awards, an Eleanor Roosevelt Humanitarian Award and a Victory Award. He has received honorary doctorates from the University of Arizona, Emerson College, St. Francis College, and Columbia College in Chicago. In 2001, Medgar Evers College created the Ben Vereen Scholarship for the Performing Arts, and in 2004, he received an Achievement in Excellence Award from his alma mater, the High School of the Performing Arts.

In 1975 he was the first simultaneous winner of the "Entertainer of the Year", "Rising Star", and "Song and Dance Star" awards from the American Guild of Variety Artists (AGVA). He also earned a coveted spot in the Casino Legends Hall of Fame.

Vereen was nominated for an NAACP Image Award for his performance in the Hallmark movie, An Accidental Friendship. In 2004, Vereen was nominated for a "Career Achievement Award" by the Le Prix International Film Star Awards Organization.

In 2011, he was inducted into the American Theatre Hall of Fame.

In 2012, Vereen was inducted into the National Museum of Dance's Mr. & Mrs. Cornelius Vanderbilt Whitney Hall of Fame.

In 2025, Vereen received the Lifetime Achievement Award at the Chita Rivera Awards for his contributions to dance in the theatre.

Vereen is an honorary member of Phi Beta Sigma fraternity. A star was nicknamed after Vereen in the International Star Registry.
