= Seattle Art Museum =

Art museum in Seattle, Washington, United States

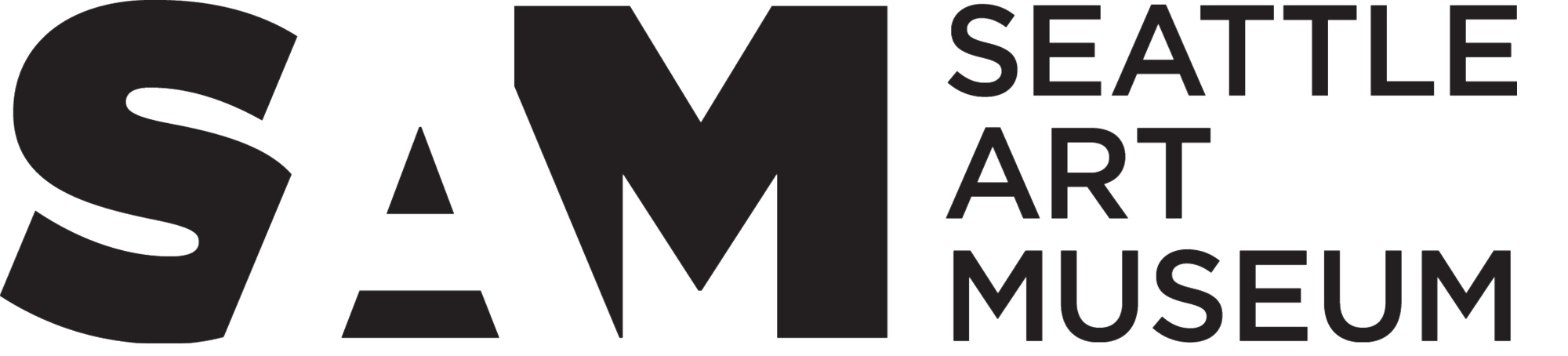

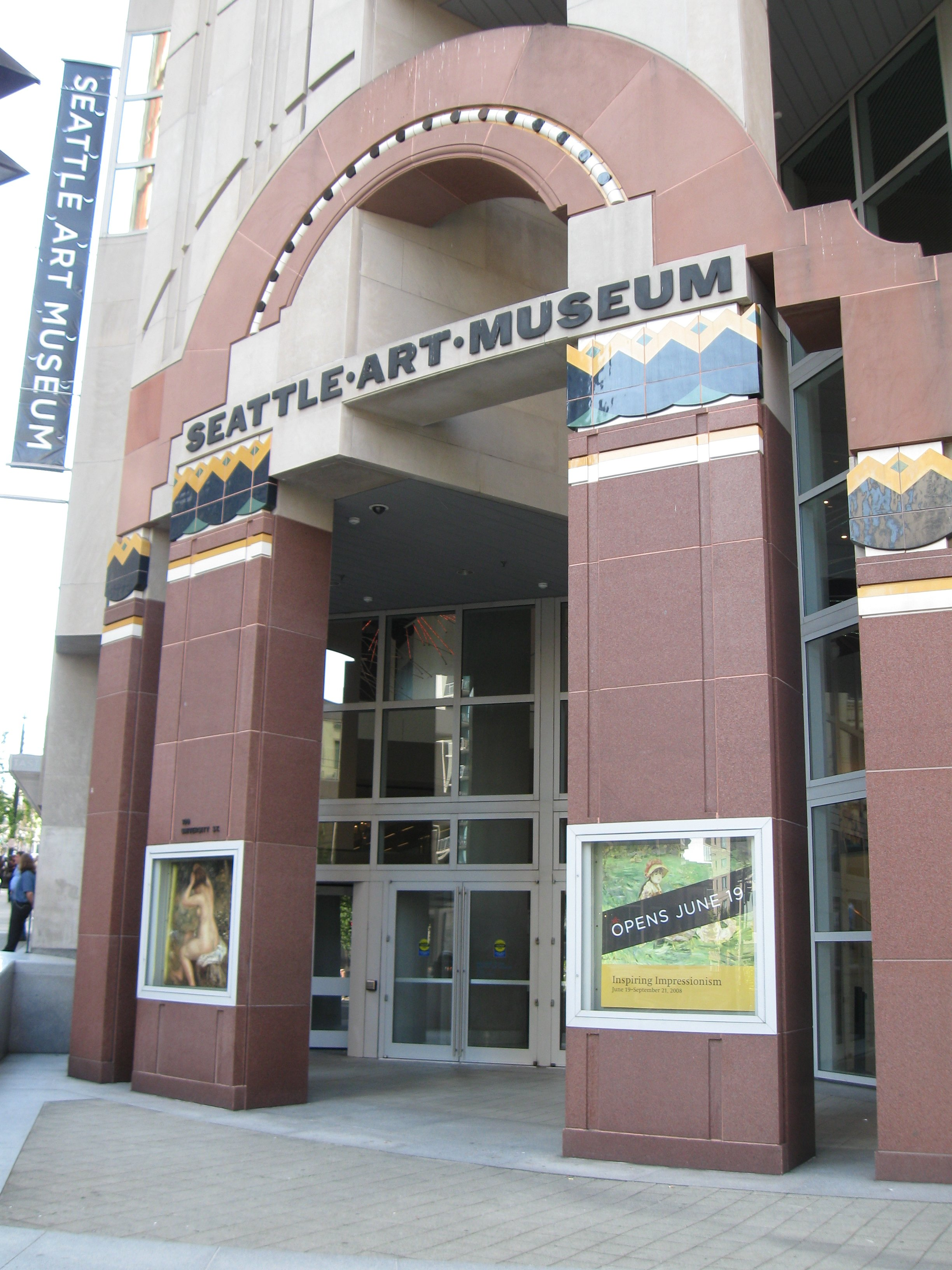
- Earlier entrance to the Seattle Art Museum (prior to its 2007 expansion)

- Location within downtown Seattle
- Established: 1933
- Location: 1300 First Avenue, Seattle, Washington, U.S.
- Coordinates: 47.6072°N 122.3381°W
- Type: Art Museum
- Collection size: 25,000
- Visitors: 750,000+ annually (all locations)
- Director: Scott Stulen
- Public transit access: Symphony station
- Website: seattleartmuseum.org

The Seattle Art Museum (commonly known as SAM) is an art museum located in Seattle, Washington, United States. The museum operates three major facilities: its main museum in downtown Seattle; the Seattle Asian Art Museum in Volunteer Park, Capitol Hill; and Olympic Sculpture Park on the central Seattle waterfront, which opened in 2007.

== History ==
The SAM collection has grown from 1,926 pieces in 1933 to nearly 25,000 as of 2008. Its original museum provided an area of 25,000 square feet (2,300 m^{2}); the present facilities provide 312,000 square feet (29,000 m^{2}) plus a 9-acre (3.6 ha) park. Paid staff have increased from 7 to 303, and the museum library has grown from approximately 1,400 books to 33,252.

In 1917, the Seattle Fine Arts Society (organized 1905) and the Washington Arts Association (organized 1906) merged into a single unified organization, keeping the Fine Arts Society name.

In 1931, the Fine Arts Society group renamed itself to the Art Institute of Seattle. The Art Institute housed its collection in Henry House, the former home, on Capitol Hill, of the collector and founder of the Henry Art Gallery, Horace C. Henry (1844–1928).

In 1931, during the Great Depression, Richard E. Fuller, president of the Seattle Fine Arts Society and the animating figure of SAM in its early years, and his mother, Margaret MacTavish Fuller, donated US$250,000 (equivalent to $5.3 million in 2025) to build an art museum in Volunteer Park on Seattle's Capitol Hill. The city provided the land and received ownership of the building, which was to be an Art Deco/Art Moderne building designed by Carl F. Gould of the architectural firm Bebb and Gould.

On June 23, 1933, the new museum opened. The Art Institute collection formed the core of the original SAM collection; the Fullers soon donated additional pieces. The Art Institute was responsible for managing art activities when the museum first opened. Fuller served as museum director into the 1970s, never taking a salary.

In 1969, SAM joined with the National Council on the Arts (later NEA), Richard Fuller, and the Seattle Foundation (in part, another Fuller family endeavor) to acquire and install Isamu Noguchi's sculpture Black Sun in front of the museum in Volunteer Park. It was the NEA's first commission in Seattle.

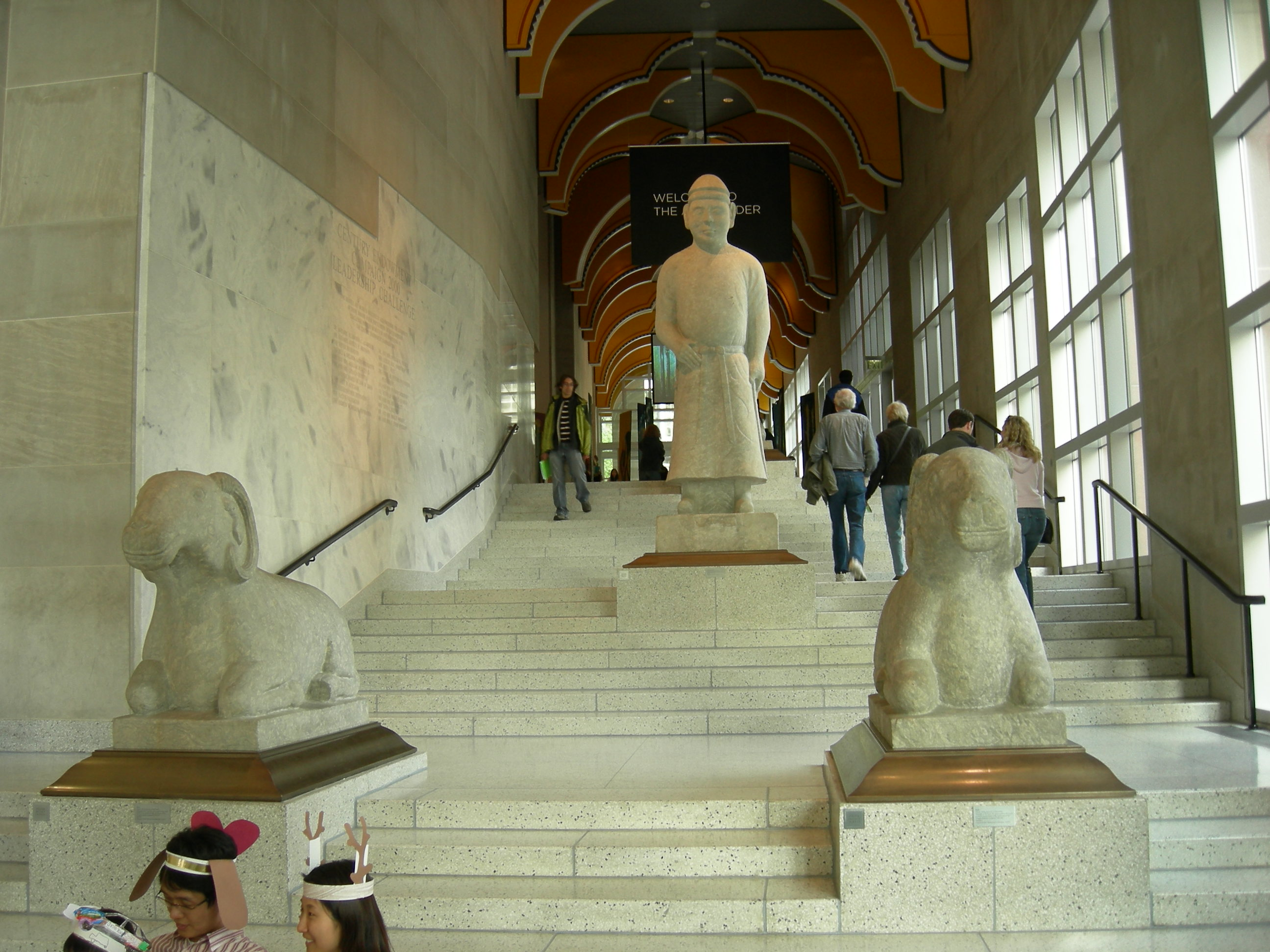
The "Art Ladder": the main staircase of the 1991 Venturi building, now integrated into the expanded SAM as a free public space

In 1983 to 1984, the museum received a donation of half of a downtown city block, the former J. C. Penney department store on the west side of Second Avenue between Union and Pike Streets. They eventually decided that this particular block was not a suitable site: that land was sold for private development as the Newmark Building, and the museum acquired land in the next block south.

On December 5, 1991, SAM reopened in a downtown facility designed by Robert Venturi; the cost of the build was US$62 million (equivalent to $147 million in 2025)

=== Hammering Man ===
In 1992, the next year, one of Jonathan Borofsky's Hammering Man sculptures was installed outside the museum as part of Seattle City Light's One Percent for Art program.

Hammering Man would have been installed in time for the museum's opening, but on September 28, 1991, as workers attempted to erect the piece, it fell, was damaged, and had to be returned to the foundry for repairs.

In 1993, on Labor Day, Hammering Man was used in a guerrilla art installation when Jason Sprinkle and other local artists attached a 700 lb (320 kg) ball and chain to the leg of the sculpture.

=== Seattle Asian Art Museum ===
In 1994, the Volunteer Park facility reopened as the Seattle Asian Art Museum.

In 2007, the Olympic Sculpture Park opened to the public, culminating an eight-year process.

In 2017, the Seattle Asian Art Museum closed for a two-year US$54 million (equivalent to $71 million in 2025) renovation and expansion project.

On February 8, 2020, the Seattle Asian Art Museum reopened.

=== Labor relations ===
In September 2021, employees of Seattle Art Museum called for a boycott of the museum for policies they claimed unfairly target unhoused people.

Soon after, in October 2021, SAM Director and CEO Amada Cruz signed onto a letter on behalf of the museum in support of increasing the city's police budget. The letter also advocated for subsidized security for nonprofit institutions, despite the recent termination of SAM's contract with Star Protection Services due to employee misconduct and the continued opposition of staff and community members.

On January 7, 2022, the visitor service officers filed to unionize in partnership with IUPAT 116. In May 2022, security employees voted to form an independent union, the SAM Visitors Service Officers (VSO) Union. The National Labor Relations Board certified the SAM VSO Union as the security officers' representative on June 8, 2022.

Since 2022, the museum has recognized and bargained with the SAM VSO Union as the security officers' collective bargaining representative, and is negotiating with the VSO for the first contract to cover the security officers.

In March 2025, the VSO Union began a strike due to the stalled negotiations amid demands for higher wages, improved benefits, and a union security clause in the contract. The wage increase since the union formed in 2021 had been described as insufficient for the region's rising cost of living.

On June 18th, 2026 SAM museum workers won their union election and formed Seattle Art Museum Workers United (SAMWU) affiliated with Washington Federation of State Employees, a local of AFSCME.

== Exhibitions ==
Among the museum's notable exhibitions were a 1954 exhibition of 25 European paintings and sculptures from the Samuel H. Kress Foundation; these pieces were donated to SAM in 1961. A 1959 Van Gogh exhibit drew 126,100 visitors. That same year, SAM organized a retrospective of the work of Northwest School painter Mark Tobey that traveled to four other U.S. museums. Tobey's works and highlights of SAM's Asian collection were featured under the museum's aegis at the Century 21 Exposition (the 1962 Seattle World's Fair). A Jacob Lawrence retrospective in 1974 honored a giant of African American art who had settled in Seattle four years earlier. Leonardo Lives (1997) featured the Codex Leicester, the last manuscript of Leonardo da Vinci in private hands, which had then been recently purchased by Bill Gates.

== Collection ==
As of January 2023, the museum's collection includes about 25,000 pieces. Among them are Alexander Calder's Eagle (1971) and Richard Serra's Wake (2004), both at the Olympic Sculpture Park; Cai Guo-Qiang's Inopportune: Stage One (2004), a sculpture constructed from cars and sequenced multi-channel light tubes formerly on display in the lobby of the SAM Downtown; The Judgment of Paris (c. 1516–18) by Lucas Cranach the Elder; Mark Tobey's Electric Night (1944); Yéil X'eenh (Raven Screen) (c. 1810), attributed to the Tlingit artist Kadyisdu.axch'; Do-Ho Suh's Some/One (2001); a Supermatist composition (1924) by Anna Kogan; and a coffin in the shape of a Mercedes-Benz (1991) by Kane Quaye.

=== Return of looted art ===
The museum returned to the heirs of 1930s French-Jewish impressionist and post-impressionist art dealer Paul Rosenberg a painting by Henri Matisse which had been looted by Nazis in World War II, after having requested that the family sue in order to reach a legal settlement that included another art dealer. So in October 1997, Rosenberg's family filed suit in District Court, to recover the painting Odalisque (1927 or 1928). It was the first lawsuit against an American museum concerning ownership of Nazi plunder during World War II. Then museum director Mimi Gardner Gates brokered an 11th hour settlement that returned the artwork, after which the museum sued the gallery which had sold it the painting in the 1950s. Author Héctor Feliciano said it was only the second instance in the US of a museum returning looted art.

== Libraries ==
The Seattle Art Museum contains the Dorothy Stimson Bullitt Library and the McCaw Foundation Library for Asian Art.

=== Dorothy Stimson Bullitt Library ===
The Dorothy Stimson Bullitt Library was founded in 1991. As of 2011 it contained 20,000 books and subscribed to 100 periodicals. It specializes in African art, contemporary art, decorative ars, European art, Modern art, and photography.

=== McCaw Foundation Library for Asian Art ===
The McCaw Foundation Library for Asian Art was founded in 1933. As of 2011 it contained 15,000 book volumes and subscribed to 100 periodicals. It specializes in Asian art.

== Facilities ==
=== Main facility ===
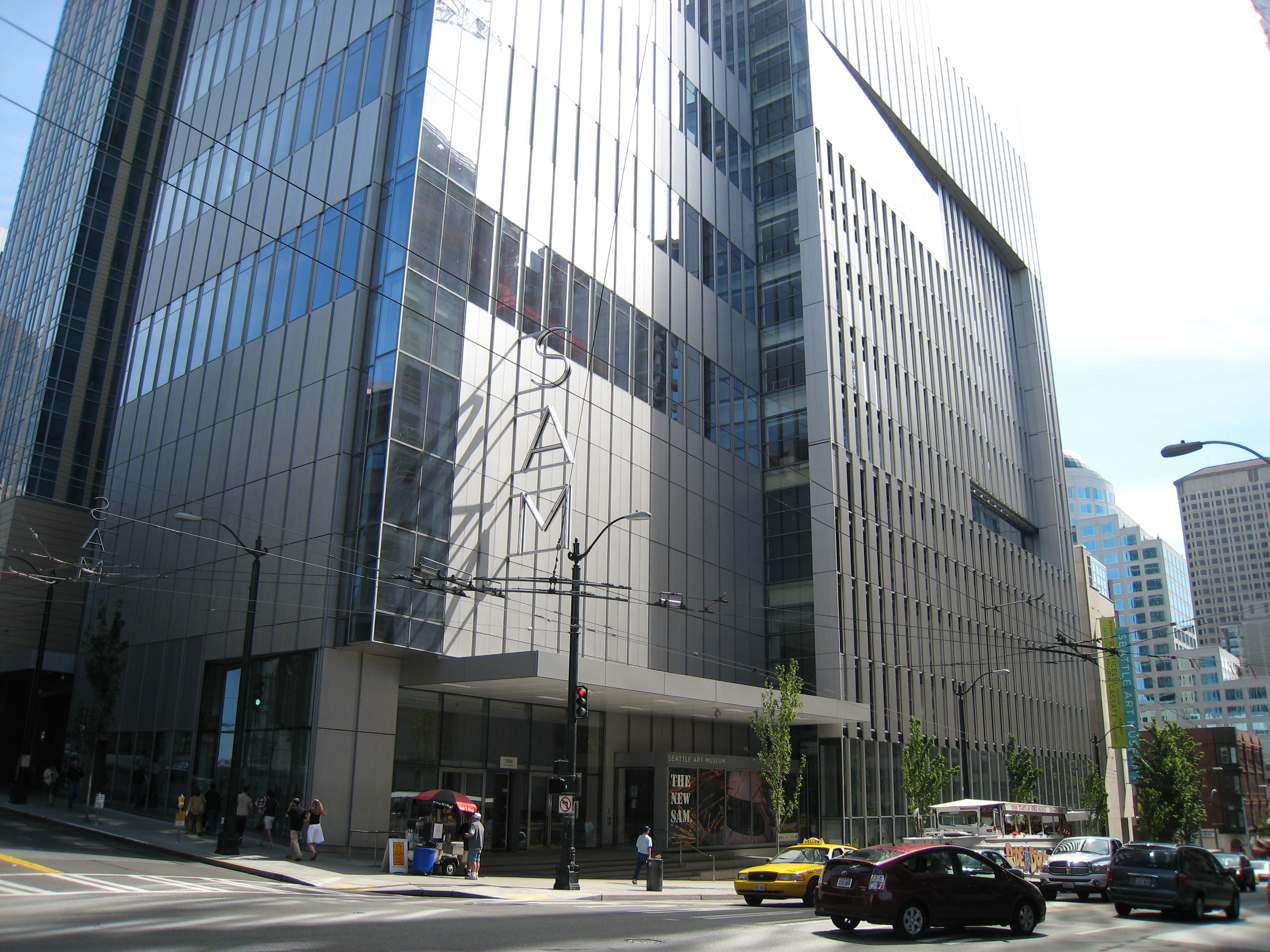
Seattle Art Museum expansion

The museum's main collection moved to its present location on First Avenue in December 1991; the museum's original building became the Seattle Asian Art Museum in 1994. The building, a limestone-covered rectangle with a streak of tile and terra cotta around its outside, is located at University Street and First Avenue, and was completed by Venturi, Scott Brown and Associates at 150,000 square feet (14,000 m^{2}) with a $28.1 million budget.

In 2006, the Seattle Art Museum began expanding its 1991 location in a joint effort with Washington Mutual (WaMu); the enlarged building was originally known as the WaMu Center. The expansion actually began in July 2004. Several pieces had to be temporarily moved to prevent them from being damaged due to vibrations during construction. This would have been the initial foundation phase of the WaMu Center. In addition to reworking the Venturi building, SAM now takes up the first four floors of a 16-floor building designed by Portland, Oregon architect Brad Cloepfil. SAM also owns the next eight floors, which WaMu originally rented; Washington Mutual owned the top four floors. As SAM expands in the future, it can take over one or more of the rented floors.

Because of the construction, the museum's downtown location was closed from January 5, 2006, to May 5, 2007. The expanded building offers 70 percent more gallery space, an expanded museum store, and a new restaurant. In anticipation of the expansion, over a thousand new pieces, with a total value over a billion dollars, were donated to the collection.

Washington Mutual's 2008 failure and subsequent acquisition by JPMorgan Chase resulted in Northwestern Mutual purchasing WaMu's share of the building September 9, 2009, and renaming it the Russell Investments Center. Currently, Russell Investments, a Northwestern Mutual subsidiary, is headquartered there, having relocated from Tacoma, Washington.

Admission to the SAM's indoor facilities is free on the first Thursday of each month; SAM also offers free admission the first Saturday of the month. And even the normal admission is suggested, meaning that the museum would like visitors to pay the complete admission but if they can not pay fully they can still enjoy the museum.

=== Modern Art Pavilion ===
After the Century 21 Exposition, the fairgrounds became the Seattle Center, and the UK Pavilion became the Modern Art Pavilion of the museum. It remained in use until 1987.

=== Asian Art Museum ===
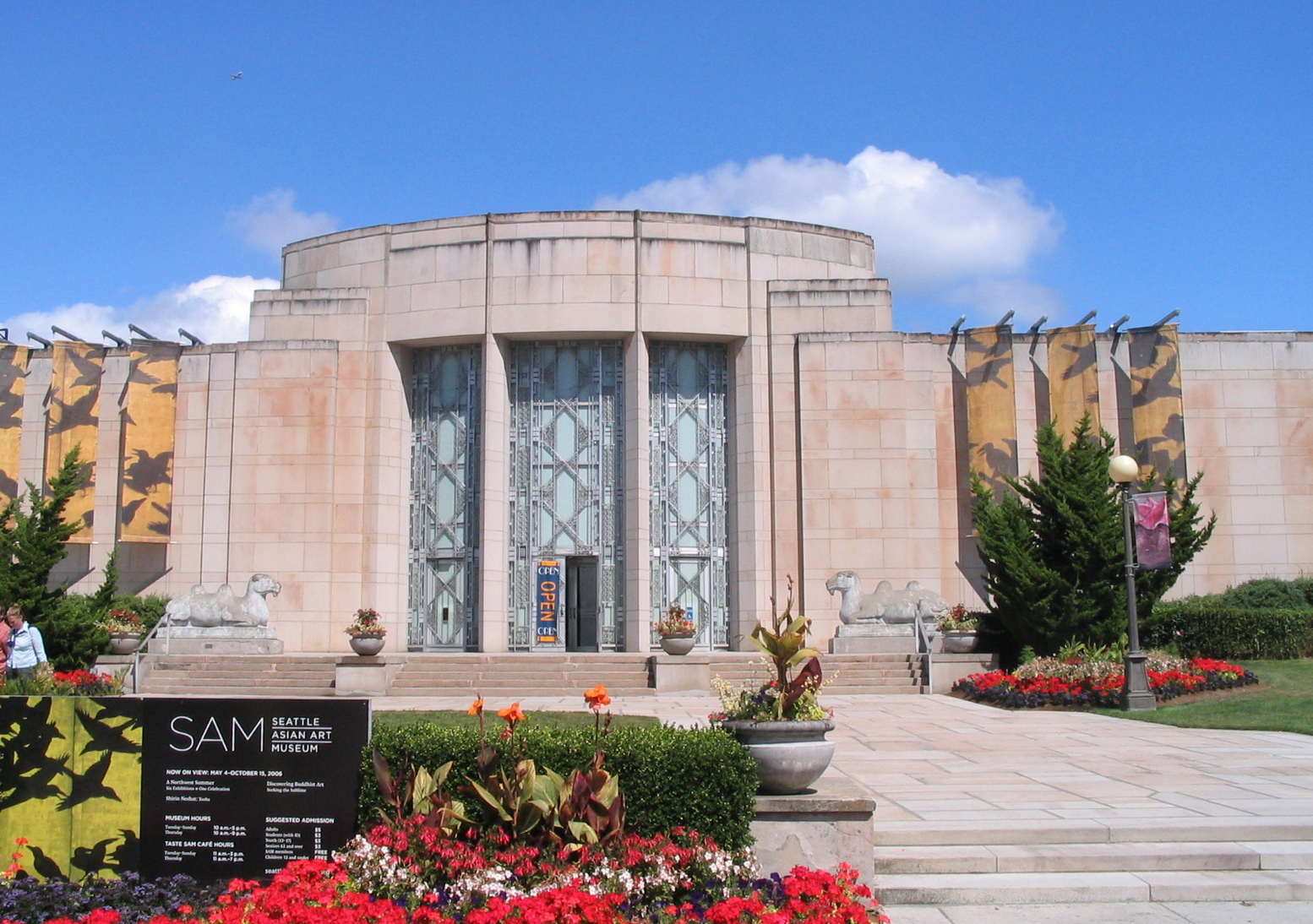
Seattle Asian Art Museum

The Seattle Asian Art Museum opened in 1994 at the original SAM facility in Volunteer Park on Seattle's Capitol Hill. The Art Deco/Moderne building was opened in 1933 and underwent two years of renovations after the original art museum had moved to its downtown location. The Asian Art Museum closed in 2017 for a major renovation and expansion that was completed in 2020. The museum regularly exhibits only 4.5 percent of its total collection, which includes artwork from China, Korea, Japan, India, and Southeast Asia.

=== Olympic Sculpture Park ===
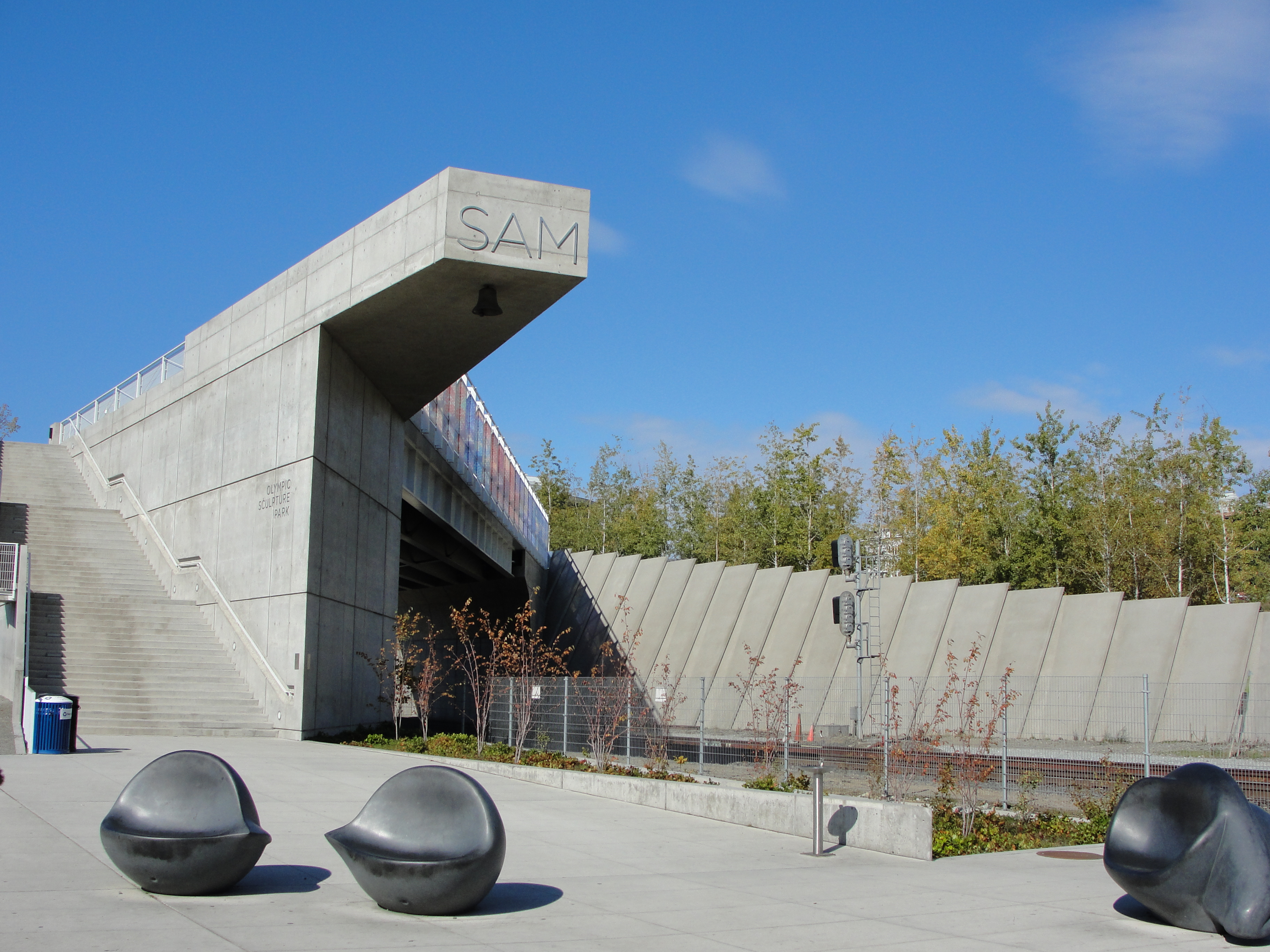
Olympic Sculpture Park

The Olympic Sculpture Park is a 9-acre (3.6 ha) free and open public park on the Seattle waterfront just north of downtown. It opened on January 20, 2007.

== Management ==
=== Governance ===
Amada Cruz was named director and CEO of the Seattle Art Museum in 2019. She succeeded Kimberly Rorschach who served as director from 2012 to 2019.

=== Funding ===
The Seattle Art Museum only receives 4% of its funding from the government; the rest of its operating costs are covered by ticket fees and its membership base. As of 2014, the museum has a $23 million budget. As a result of the banking crisis, the museum in 2009 lost $5.8 million in annual rental and related income from its tenant Washington Mutual. It faced an accumulated debt of $56 million dating back from when the museum and Washington Mutual partnered on a new downtown building they intended to share. After the bank was sold to JPMorgan Chase in 2008, it left the museum with eight floors of office space, at a cost of about $5.8 million a year. Help came in the form of grants from the JPMorgan Chase and the Gates Foundation. The museum's endowment for art purchases is currently at less than $7.8 million. In 2016, the Seattle Art Museum was the Seattle Art Fair's Beneficiary Partner where it received $100,000 from the Opening Night Preview.

=== Attendance ===
While the number of visitors has grown, the pattern is more complicated: 346,287 people visited the museum in its first year; in 1978 the traveling exhibit Treasures of Tutankhamun (shown in the facility at Seattle Center) drew 1.3 million visitors in four months; 2007 attendance was 797,127. In 2010, the exhibition "Picasso: Masterpieces from the Musée National Picasso, Paris" drew more than 405,000 and was the museum's most-attended exhibition since it moved to its downtown location from Volunteer Park in 1991. In SAM's history, only the 1978 King Tut exhibition, held at Seattle Center, ranked higher in attendance.
