= April Street =

American artist

- Born: 1975 (age 50–51); Virginia
- Education: Tennessee University, School of the Art Institute of Chicago
- Known for: Painting, Installation
- Movement: Feminist
- Website: http://www.aprilstreet.com

April Street (born 1975) is an American artist acclaimed for painting and installation art. Street is known for her paintings where she begins with a private act of wrapping her body in swathes of fabric, and then choreographing herself dipping into various pools of paint. She then covers her canvases with paint-streaked hosiery fabric, like flesh over bone, that exist in a plane between sculpture and painting, similar to artists Louise Bourgeois, Eva Hesse, and Carolee Schneemann.

== Work ==
A Los Angeles-based artist, whose work has been exhibited throughout Southern California and internationally. Street studied bronze casting in Cortona, Italy and painting at School of the Art Institute of Chicago. Referencing history, exploration, mythology, and art history, Street's works combine the material experimentation of Second-wave feminism with allusions to the theatricality, illusionism, and palette of 17th-century Dutch still-life painting. Street has had solo exhibitions at the Santa Barbara Museum of Art, the Underground Museum, and Vielmetter Los Angeles.
