= Karon Davis =

American visual artist (born 1977)

- Born: Karon Vereen; 1977 (age 48–49); Reno, Nevada, United States
- Other name: Karon Om Vereen–Davis
- Occupations: Sculptor, installation artist
- Spouse: Noah Davis (m. 2008; died 2015)
- Father: Ben Vereen

Karon Davis (née Vereen; born 1977), is an American visual artist, and a founder of the Underground Museum in Los Angeles. She is known as a sculptor and an installation artist touching on issues of race and identity in America through representations of the human body. Her artistic practice is influenced by dance, theater, and moving image.

== Early life and education ==
Karon Vereen was born in 1977 in Reno, Nevada. Daughter of professional dancers Nancy Bruner and Broadway performer Ben Vereen, Davis grew up influenced by the performing arts. Bruner retired from her ballet career to raise Karon and her three siblings. Her father is noted American actor, dancer, and singer, Ben Vereen.

Davis attended the theater department at Spelman College and took classes at the Alvin Ailey American Dance Theater company before studying and graduating in film (2001) at University of Southern California's Cinematic Arts department.

== Career ==
In 2016, Karon Davis presented the solo show "Karon Davis: Pain Management" at Wilding Cran Gallery, Los Angeles. The exhibition featured her signature plaster sculpture bodies, of adults and children, that physically take up space as a large-scale installation. The show commented on emotional experiences of loss and endured agony. In 2017, Davis was the recipient of The Louis Comfort Tiffany Foundation Biennial Grant.

Davis's Mary (2016) from the Pain Management series, was presented at Prospect.5: Yesterday we said tomorrow 2020-21, the contemporary arts triennial in New Orleans, Louisiana.

In 2021, Davis revealed new installations memorializing Bobby Seale and the Black Panther Party in the solo show "No Good Deed Goes Unpunished" at Jeffrey Deitch gallery in New York. One of the installations consists of sandbags leaning against a wall in which a well circulated journalistic photograph of Bobby Seale, the cofounder and Panther leader. The image was taken while Seale was waiting trial during the Chicago Seven Trial event, in 1969. For the sculpture Bobby Seale and The People's Free Food Program (2020–21), a cast of Seale is surrounded by fifty bags of golden food placed on the floor. This installation was later acquired by the Pérez Art Museum Miami.

In April 2023, the Hammer Museum exhibited Karon Davis: Selection from the Hammer Contemporary Collection, the collection presentation was organized by the Hammer former-chief curator Connie Butler. In November of same year, she unfolded a High Line Park commission titled Curtain Call, which runs through 2024. The solo exhibition Beauty Must Suffer was on view at New York's Salon 94 gallery through December 2023, and it showcased her plaster-cast sculptures of ballerinas.

== Underground Museum ==
In 2012, Karon Davis and Noah Davis co-founded the Underground Museum in Arlington Heights, a predominantly Black and Latino neighborhood in Central Los Angeles, California. The museum was a cultural hub for Black art; artists such as Henry Taylor, Lorna Simpson, Arthur Jafa, and Deana Lawson presented their work there, while musicians John Legend and Solange Knowles launched albums there.

Karon Davis presented her first institutional show "Sculptures & Photographs" for the museum inauguration. In 2015, visual artist Noah Davis died after battling against a rare type of cancer. He was 32 years old. After ten years of operations, the Underground Museum closed in March 2022.

== Artworks in collections ==
- Beauty Must Suffer, 2023.
- Beth and Solomon, 2018. Rubell Museum, Miami, Florida, and Washington D.C., U.S.
- Bobby Seale and The People’s Free Food Program, 2020–2021. Pérez Art Museum Miami, Miami, Florida, U.S.
- Cat's Cradle, 2019. Hammer Museum, University of California, Los Angeles (UCLA), Los Angeles, California, U.S.
- Echo & Narcissus: The Embrace, 2023.
- Family, 2019. Rubell Museum, Miami, Florida, and Washington D.C., U.S.
- Gabriel, 2016. Louis Comfort Tiffany Foundation, U.S.
- Nicotine, 2016. Brooklyn Museum, New York, U.S.
- Noah and his Ark, 2017. Private collection, California, U.S.
- Overture, 2023.
- Oya, 2016. Louis Comfort Tiffany Foundation, U.S.
- Principal Lewis, 2019. Hammer Museum, University of California, Los Angeles (UCLA), Los Angeles, California, U.S.
- Stairway to Heaven, 2019. Hammer Museum, University of California, Los Angeles (UCLA), Los Angeles, California, U.S.
