= Amada Cruz =

Amada Cruz is the director and CEO of the Santa Barbara Museum of Art. She was director of the Seattle Art Museum until October 2023 and was The Sybil Harrington Director & Chief Executive Officer of Phoenix Art Museum from February 2015 through mid 2019. Cruz has been a controversial museum leader, who has prioritized Hispanic artists as a contemporary art curator and a museum director. In 2018, she received the annual Virginia Cardenas Award for her outreach to communities of color while director of the Phoenix Art Museum. In 2015, she was named by W magazine as one of the 11 most powerful museum directors. Cruz has been embroiled in several controversies over the course of her career, including alleged discrimination of unhoused individuals at the Seattle Art Museum, allegedly creating a hostile work environment at the Phoenix Art Museum, and terminating the employment of an Asian American museum curator at the Santa Barbara Museum of Art.

== Early life ==
Born in Havana, Cuba, Cruz studied Art History and Political Science at New York University.

== Career ==
Cruz's first museum position was as a curatorial intern at the Solomon R. Guggenheim Museum in New York, where she subsequently worked as a Curatorial Assistant.

Her other museum positions have included posts as Associate Curator, Hirshhorn Museum and Sculpture Garden at the Smithsonian Institution; Acting Chief Curator and Manilow Curator of Exhibitions at the Museum of Contemporary Art in Chicago; Director of the Center for Curatorial Studies Museum at Bard College; and as the former executive director at San Antonio-based Artpace, an artist residency program.

Cruz has also worked as a grantmaker and was the founding Program Director for United States Artists in Los Angeles, where she was responsible for all programming activities of a Ford and Rockefeller Foundations initiative. She also has been executive director of Artadia: The Fund and Dialogue in New York City, which awarded grants to visual artists in San Francisco, Houston and Chicago.

Cruz arrived at the Seattle Art Museum just before the pandemic and successfully steered that institution through the crisis. She created a staff and board Equity Task Force, which became a permanent board committee. She also appointed its first Director of Equity, Diversity, and Inclusion, Priya Frank. Cruz brought in two important art donations, one of 20th-century Abstract Expressionist and European modernists and a group of works by Alexander Calder. She spearheaded a two-year project, funded primarily by a $1 million Mellon Foundation grant, to transform the American Art galleries through an inclusive collaborative approach with SAM staff, artists, and advisors from the Seattle community. In June 2021, as CEO and director of Seattle Art Museum, Amada Cruz drew ire from staff and community members for policies they felt would disproportionately harm unhoused individuals: the installation of boullards and the hiring of a private security company. In September, in response to these policies, a group of community members and staff called for a boycott of the museum. In October, Amada Cruz signed onto a letter from the Downtown Seattle Association, on behalf of the museum, calling on the city council to increase the police budget and subsidize private security for nonprofits, despite staff comments and the recent termination of Seattle Art Museum's contract with Star Protection Services, due to an employee's inappropriate conduct.

At the Phoenix Art Museum, Cruz was hired to make bold, strategic changes after the 32-year tenure of its previous director. She encouraged collaborations with other art groups and empowered curators to organize traveling exhibitions. She hired Gilbert Vicario, the museum's first Latinx chief curator. While director of the Phoenix Art Museum, some said her actions and treatment of staff had a negative impact on donations and employee retention. Cruz worked to reverse the Phoenix Art Museum's growing financial deficits and streamlined its operations. However upon six months of Cruz's arrival more than a dozen employees left and over a year more than 100 volunteers resigned because of alleged treatment by Cruz and her staff. The total docents for the 2018 fiscal year was 454; eight months later it was 353, a 22 percent decrease. She left to become CEO of the Santa Barbara Museum of Art in October 2023.

Amada Cruz was hired to lead the SBMA after the 15-year tenure of her predecessor. She is only the second woman to lead the institution and the first Latina. After arriving at the Santa Barbara Museum of Art (SBMA), Cruz again caused controversy by cancelling a long planned exhibit exploring the legacy of art historian Michael Fried citing a "lack of diversity" among the 20 artists who were scheduled to take part. Immediately after cancelling the planned show, Cruz eliminated the position of the show's curator, long-time museum employee Eik Kahng. Specifically Cruz became Director in October 2023 and in December 2023 cancelled Three American Painters: Then and Now, citing the aim of making the museum "more inclusive and more reflective of Santa Barbara County's diverse community." Chief Curator Eik Kahng conceived the exhibit as a reimagining of art historian Michael Fried's 1965 show Three American Painters, considered a precursor to Fried's 1967 historical essay "Art and Objecthood." The SBMA exhibit was to open summer 2024. Kahng was dismissed in January 2024 and Cruz appointed herself to Kahng's position. According to Santa Barbara Independent Cruz's "tenures at previous institutions were punctuated by controversy." SBMA did not provided a reason for Kahng's termination.
