= Ruben Ochoa =

American artist (born 1974)

Ruben Ochoa (born 1974 in Oceanside, California, United States) is an artist who lives and works in Los Angeles.

== Life and work ==
Ochoa, who is of Mexican American descent, studied at the University of California, Irvine (MFA, 2003), Otis College of Art and Design, Los Angeles (BFA, 1997), and the Parsons School of Art and Design, New York City.

He was included in the 2008 Whitney Biennial at the Whitney Museum of American Art, and the 2004 California Biennal at the Orange County Museum of Art.

Ruben Ochoa's interdisciplinary practice includes sculpture, site-specific and site-responsive installations, photography, drawing, and public intervention. An aspect of his work touches upon the urban surrounding of the city, the tension between social classes, urban architecture, and nature. He works in a range of media, mostly including basic building materials such as rebar and concrete.

He has had solo exhibitions at the Museum of Contemporary Art, San Diego, California, Charles H. Scott gallery at Emily Carr University of Art and Design, Vancouver, British Columbia, Canada (2009) and SITE, Santa Fe, New Mexico (2009).

Ruben Ochoa is represented by Vielmetter Los Angeles.

== Awards ==
In 2008 he was a recipient of a John Simon Guggenheim Memorial Foundation Fellowship, and in 2005 he was awarded a Creative Capital Grant for his Fwy Wall Extraction project. He also received California Community Foundation Grants 2004 and 2013

== Collections ==
- Smithsonian Museum of American Art
- Orange County Museum of Art
- Pérez Art Museum Miami
- Whitney Museum of American Art
