= Forrest Kirk =

- Born: San Diego, California
- Education: California State University, Los Angeles
- Known for: Painting

Forrest Kirk (born 1975) is an American contemporary artist whose work explores themes of race, history, and urban culture through highly textured, layered paintings. His approach merges abstraction and figuration, often using unconventional materials to engage with memory and social structures. Kirk’s works have been exhibited in institutions such as the Hammer Museum, Museum of Contemporary Art San Diego, and the California African American Museum.

== Early life and education ==
Born in 1975 in San Diego, Kirk was influenced by the social and cultural landscapes of his upbringing. He studied at California State University, Los Angeles and later developed his practice through independent studies, including time spent in Paris.

== Career ==
Kirk’s work is recognized for its engagement with racial identity, power structures, and historical memory. His process often involves layering paint, using fabric, and incorporating raw textures. He noted that his approach blends “physicality with psychological depth,” citing his use of tar, acrylic, and sculptural techniques.

=== Notable series: Body Count and Fist ===
In 2018, Kirk debuted his Body Count series, which examines themes of law enforcement and systemic violence, described as “unflinching in its interrogation of power dynamics.” His Fist series explores gestures of power and solidarity as “a layered investigation into resistance and struggle.” Kirk’s use of unconventional materials, such as roofing tar and recycled textiles, has been noted for its tactile and sculptural quality.

== Collections ==
Kirk’s work is part of the permanent collections of the Hammer Museum, Los Angeles, CA, Museum of Contemporary Art San Diego, CA, Santa Barbara Museum of Art, CA, Virginia Museum of Fine Arts, Richmond, VA, Crocker Art Museum, Sacramento, CA, Portland Art Museum, OR, California African American Museum, Los Angeles, CA, and the Cedars-Sinai Hospital Collection, Los Angeles, CA.

== Artistic style and influence ==
Kirk’s style is influenced by Abstract Expressionism and social realism, with critics drawing comparisons to Jean-Michel Basquiat and Philip Guston. His layered surfaces and incorporation of found materials have been described as “painterly and sculptural,” engaging with themes of memory, race, and historical narratives.
