= Matthew Angelo Harrison =

American artist (born 1989)

- Born: December 31, 1989 (age 36); Detroit, MI
- Education: School of the Art Institute of Chicago

Matthew Angelo Harrison (born 1989) is an American artist living and working in Detroit, MI. His work investigates analog and digital technologies to explore ancestry, authenticity, and the relationship between African culture and African-American culture.

== Life and work ==
Harrison was born in Detroit, Michigan, where he currently lives and works. After earning a BFA from the School of the Art Institute of Chicago in 2012, Harrison worked at Ford Motor Company prototyping clay models for cars and car parts. His past work with machinery and industrial design continues to inform and inspire his artistic process today. In his work, Harrison explores issues of race, design, mortality and industry by making use of various technologies. Inspired by the notion of an “abstract ancestry,” Harrison focuses on collecting relics and symbols of African American culture that can be re-contextualized or re-simulated.

Bodies of Work

In his "Dark Silhouettes" series, Harrison “encapsulates” dissections of African tribal sculptures in subtly tinted resin blocks. Some of the figures, heads and masks come from Makonde and Dogon tribes while others are of unknown origin. Harrison then slices through or burrows holes, with a CNC router, into some of the blocks producing unique forms and evoking diverse places and times.

In his “Dark Povera” series, Harrison scans African artifacts and then reproduces them with his homemade low-resolution 3D printers. In contrast to most 3D printers, which print with silicone and other strong synthetic plastics, Harrison’s hand-made printers utilize a wet clay, creating a finished product that is an imperfect, abstracted reproduction of the original artifact.

== Exhibitions ==
Solo exhibitions

- Detroit City/Detroit Affinities, curated by Jens Hoffmann, MOCAD, Detroit, MI, 2016
- Dark Povera Part 1, Atlanta Contemporary, Atlanta, GA, 2017
- Post Truth / The Lie That Tells the Truth, Culture Lab, Detroit, MI, 2017
- 'Prototype of Dark Silhouettes, Jessica Silverman Gallery, San Francisco, CA, 2018
- 'Abstract Ancestry: Machine Works on Paper, University of Michigan Institute for the Humanities, Ann Arbor, MI, 2018
- Field Station: Matthew Angelo Harrison, Broad Museum, Michigan State University, East Lansing, MI, 2018

Group exhibitions

- Ever get the feeling we’re not alone in this world?, What Pipeline, Detroit, MI, 2016
- The Politics of Portraiture, Jessica Silverman Gallery, San Francisco, CA, 2016
- Take Me (I’m Yours), curated by Hans Ulrich Obrist, Jens Hoffmann and Kelly Taxter, Jewish Museum, New York, NY, 2016
- Eric Schmid is an Idiot, curated by What Pipeline, CAVE Detroit, MI, 2017
- Sonic Rebellion: Music as Resistance, MOCAD, Detroit, MI, 2017
- Fictions, The Studio Museum in Harlem, New York, NY, 2017
- The Everywhere Studio, Institute of Contemporary Art, Miami, FL, 2017
- Songs for Sabotage, New Museum Triennial, New Museum, New York, NY, 2018
- At Large Part 2, Reyes Projects, Detroit, MI, 2018
- I Was Raised on the Internet, Museum of Contemporary Art Chicago, Chicago, IL, 2018
- Kinship, Jessica Silverman Gallery, San Francisco, CA, 2018
- Uncanny Valley, De Young Museum, San Francisco, CA, 2019
- Landlord Colors: On Art, Economy, and Materiality, Cranbrook Museum, Bloomfield Hills, MI, 2019
- Colored People Time: Quotidian Pasts, Institute of Contemporary Art, University of Pennsylvania, Philadelphia, PA, 2019

== Public collections ==
- Museum of Contemporary Art, Chicago, IL
- Broad Art Museum, Michigan State University, East Lansing, MI
- Galeries Lafayette Foundation - Fonds de dotation Famille Moulin, Paris
- de Young Museum, San Francisco, CA
- Institute of Contemporary Art, Miami, FL
- Kadist, San Francisco/Paris
- Rennie Collection, Vancouver, B.C.
