= Carolyn Lazard =

American artist

- Born: Carolyn Lieba Francois Lazard; 1987 (age 38–39); San Bernardino, California
- Education: Bard College, University of Pennsylvania

Carolyn Lieba Francois Lazard (born 1987) is an American artist of Haitian and French descent based in New York. Lazard works in video, sound, sculpture, installation and performance. Lazard's work is informed by their personal experience of chronic illness and often addresses disability, labor, and institutional infrastructures in healthcare and art. Lazard is a 2019 Pew Foundation Fellow, one of the first recipients of The Ford Foundation's 2020 Disability Futures Fellows Awards and a 2021 United States Artist Fellow. In 2023, Lazard was selected as a recipient of the MacArthur Fellowship, colloquially known as the "genius grant."

== Early life and education ==
Carolyn Lieba Francois Lazard was born in 1987 in San Bernardino, California.

Lazard graduated with a B.A. degree in 2010 from Bard College. They earned their MFA degree in 2019 from the University of Pennsylvania.

== Artworks ==
Lazard’s installation A Conspiracy (2017) "consists of a network of humming white noise machines hung from the ceiling above. These devices mask sound and are typically used in the home to induce sleep and concentration or in offices to provide privacy for workers. Lazard repurposes these mass-produced therapeutic objects to affect visitors’ experience as they move in and out of the gallery space. As described by the artist, A Conspiracy provides a location for viewers to gather in “conspiratorial speech and gossip.”

In the video work, CRIP TIME (2018) "Lazard methodically replenishes an assortment of brightly colored pill boxes, their labels worn from use. One by one, each pill keeps time like an irregular clock. Lazard uses the durational medium of video to transform a seemingly mundane task into a new way of measuring time—one that reflects the experience of living with chronic illness. The concept of “crip time” rejects capitalist notions of worth and value that suggest we must always move forward and keep producing. In Lazard’s words,“the body is too unwieldy to fit within the schema of authoritative interpretation.”

Lazard’s installation from the 2019 Whitney Biennial was titled Extended Stay (2019). For this installation “Lazard sourced a television monitor and armature of a sort frequently found in infusion centers where patients receive chemotherapy and other treatments. In making the work the artist asked the Museum to be wired for cable television. The resulting installation encourages visitors to reflect on the simultaneity of live television, bringing them into a shared media experience with hospital patients. Rather than playing a constant live stream, the television has been programmed to surf the channels autonomously.”

Carolyn Lazard’s installation, "Long Take reorients the experience of performance, questioning the visual primacy of dance and returning it to the body. There are three screens, and there are benches (adapted as artworks to offer greater comfort and support than the standard institutional plank)... Leans, Reverses (2022), the main installation, itself leans between artwork and mediation, using audio description as both subject and material."

Lazards 2025 exhibition TWO WAY at Artists Space "transformed the gallery into a two-chamber black box cinema, screening both a fictional and a documentary film, each shot at the simulation center of Elmhurst Hospital, a facility of NYC Health + Hospitals". ... "Fiction Contract (2025), shown on the right side of the gallery, documents a childbirth simulation involving an all-Black team of healthcare professionals, alongside a Black birthing mannequin named Jada. The term “fiction contract” refers to the mutual agreement among simulation participants to engage with the scenario as if it were real, while remaining aware that it is, indeed, not." ... "Vital (2025), screened in the gallery’s left chamber, is a fictional narrative. Set in the same simulation center."

== Other Activities ==
Lazard's published writing includes How to Be a Person in the Age of Autoimmunity (2013); Accessibility in the Arts: A Promise and a Practice (2019), commissioned by Recess; and The World is Unknown (2019), published by Triple Canopy as part of its Immaterial Literature project area.

Alongside their studio practice they are a co-founder of Canaries, with Jesse Cohen and Bonnie Swencionis. Canaries is a network of women and gender nonconforming people living and working with autoimmune conditions and other chronic illnesses to create work. The members are artists, painters, actors, and writers who all experience bodily phenomena outside the frame of biomedical discourse. The group, originally based in New York City, has taken the form of a listserve, an art collective, and a support group with regular meetings. As a collective they have exhibited at Recess, New York; Elizabeth Foundation for the Arts, New York; and Franklin Street Works, Connecticut.

Lazard is also a cofounder of I Wanna Be With You Everywhere, a collective of disabled practitioners who host a multidisciplinary performance festival across venues like Performance Space New York and the Whitney Museum of American Art.

== Exhibitions ==
=== Notable Solo Exhibitions ===
- 2018 – SYNC, Essex Street Gallery, New York, New York
- 2020 – Hintertür, Kunstverein Braunschweig, Braunschweig, Germany
- 2022 – Long Take, Walker Art Center, Minneapolis, Minnesota
- 2022 – Long Take, Nottingham Contemporary, Nottingham, UK
- 2023 – Long Take, Institute of Contemporary Art, Philadelphia, Pennsylvania
- 2025 – Two-Way, Artists Space, New York, New York
- 2025 – Corpus, Trautwein Herleth, Berlin, Germany

=== Selected Group Exhibitions ===
- 2017 – Trigger: Gender as a Tool and a Weapon, New Museum, New York, New York
- 2019 – Colored People Time, Institute of Contemporary Art, Philadelphia, Pennsylvania
- 2019 – Whitney Biennial, The Whitney Museum of American Art, New York, New York
- 2020 – Antibodies, Palais de Tokyo, Paris, France
- 2021 – Greater New York, MoMA PS1, Long Island City, New York
- 2021 – Crip Time, Museum Für Moderne Kunst, Frankfurt, Germany
- 2022 – The Milk of Dreams, 59th International Art Exhibition at la Biennale di Venezia, Venice, Italy
- 2023 – On the Value of Time, Museum Ludwig, Cologne, Germany
- 2023 – NGV Triennial, National Gallery of Victoria, Melbourne, Australia
- 2024 – Air de repos (Breathwork), CAPC musée d’art contemporain, Bordeaux, France
- 2024 – Whitney Biennial, The Whitney Museum of American Art, New York, New York
- 2026 – Collection as Cosmos, Van AbbeMuseum, Eindhoven, Netherlands
