= Venice Theatre =

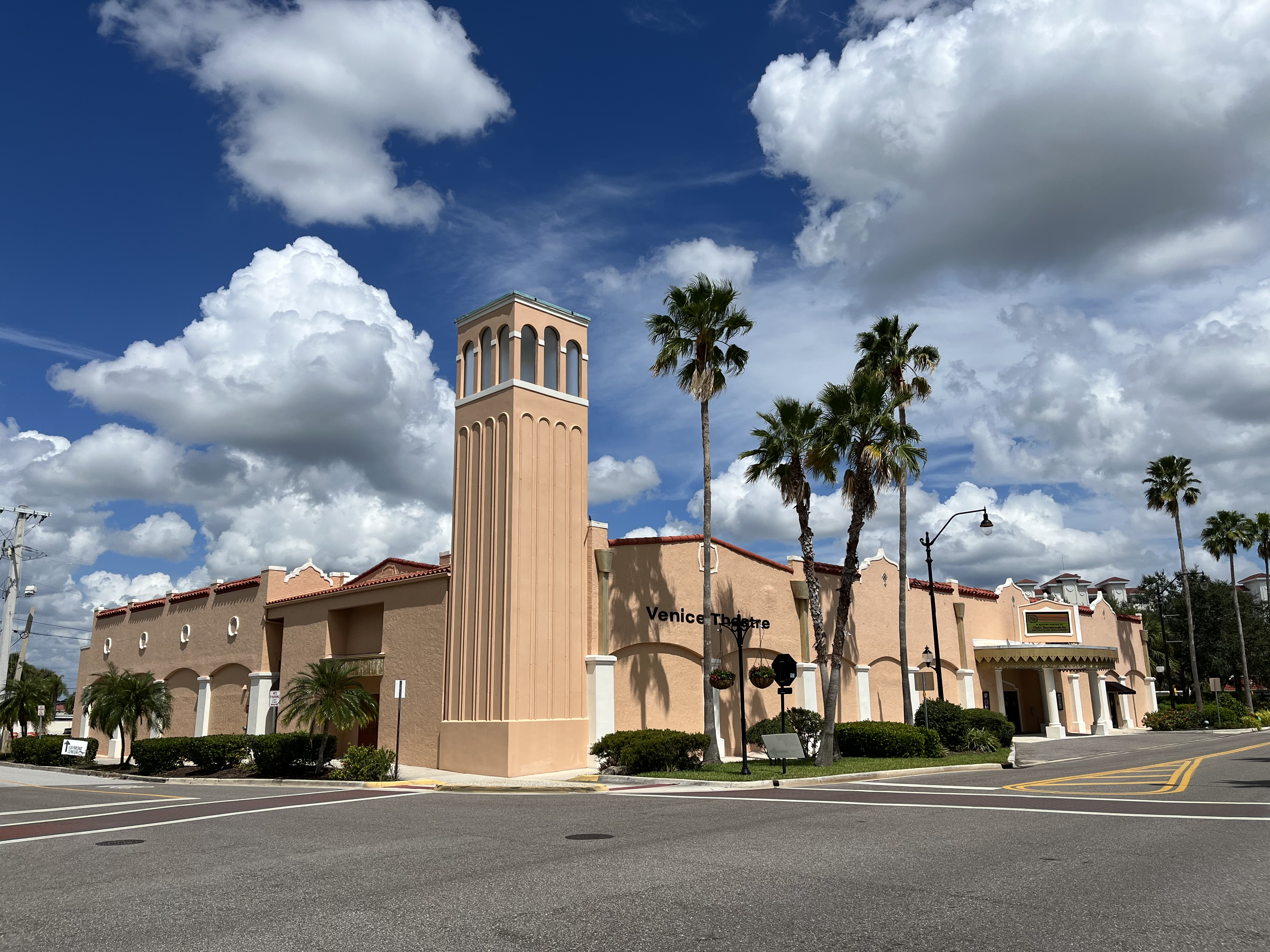
- Interactive map of Venice Theatre
- Former names: Venice Little Theatre
- Address: 140 West Tampa Avenue
- Location: Venice, Florida
- Coordinates: 27.10108°N 82.4451°W
- Capacity: 432 (Mainstage); 90 (Pinkerton Theater)
- Type: Theatre
- Public transit: Breeze Transit

Construction
- Opened: 1950

Website
- www.venicestage.com

Venice Theatre is a community theatre in Venice, Florida, United States.

== History ==
The theatre operates at one of the former buildings of the Kentucky Military Institute. KMI closed its Venice campus in 1971 and Venice Theatre acquired the building on 140 West Tampa Avenue in 1973 for $78,000 (equivalent to $419,000 in 2024) and converting the building to a theatre required an additional $225,000 (equivalent to $1,210,000 in 2024).

The theater suffered extensive damage in September 2022 due to heavy rain and winds from Hurricane Ian.
