= Santa Barbara Museum of Art =

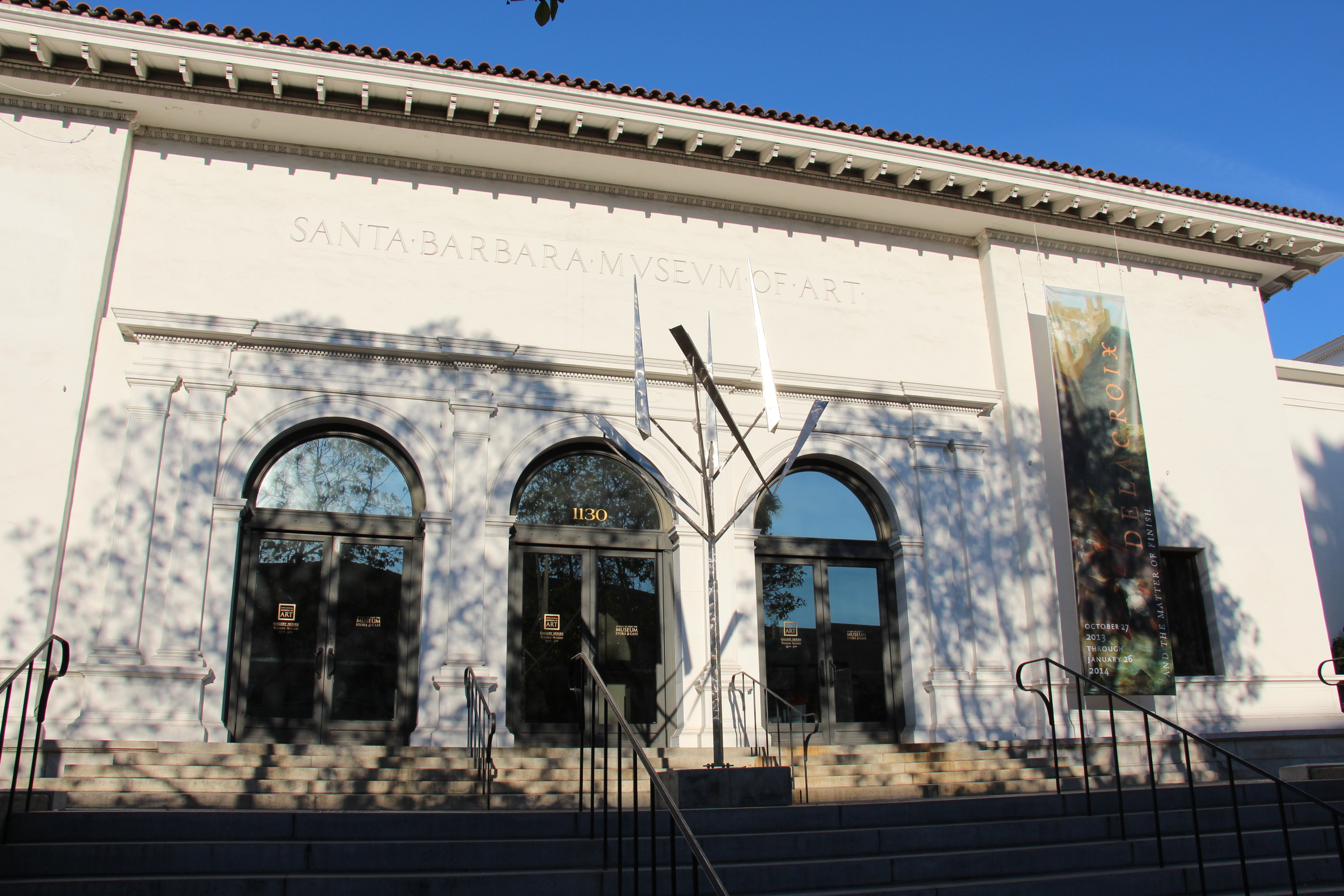
- Established: 1941
- Location: 1130 State Street Santa Barbara, CA United States
- Coordinates: 34.422789°N 119.70345°W
- Type: Art museum
- Director: Amada Cruz
- Website: http://www.sbma.net/

The Santa Barbara Museum of Art (SBMA) is an art museum located in downtown Santa Barbara, California, United States.

Founded in 1941, it is home to both permanent and special collections, the former of which includes Asian, American, and European art that spans 4,000 years from ancient to modern.

== History ==
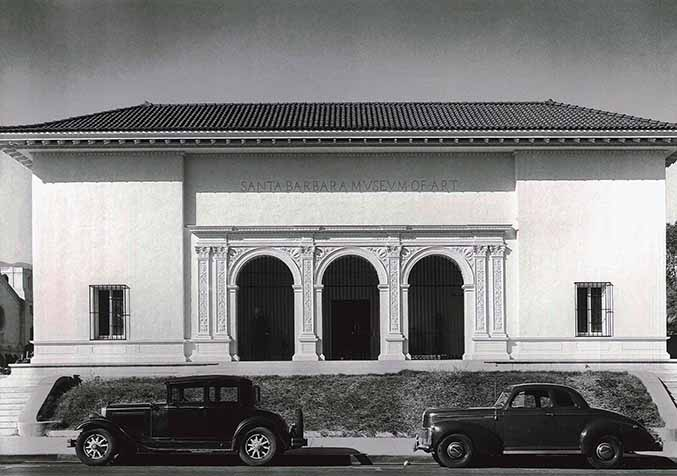
Santa Barbara Museum of Art, ca. 1941. Santa Barbara Museum of Art Archives.

The Santa Barbara Museum of Art opened to the public on June 5, 1941, in a building that was originally the Santa Barbara Federal Post Office Building, (1914–1932). The idea for an art museum first came from the local artist Colin Campbell Cooper when he learned that the post office was going to be sold. In a letter to the editor published in the Santa Barbara News-Press in July 1937, Cooper proposed that the impressive Italianate structure should be transformed into a museum. After gaining momentum and with the support of local businesses, politicians and art collectors the Santa Barbara Museum of Art was officially established just four years after Cooper's letter was published. The renowned Chicago architect David Adler was hired to simplify the building's façade and create the Museum's first galleries including: Ludington Court, Thayer Gallery, von Romberg Gallery, Campbell Gallery and Gould Gallery. One of the Museum's key founders, Wright S. Ludington, was instrumental in its formation and was active with the Museum for over 50 years even serving as its president in the early 1950s. Most importantly, Ludington donated nearly 400 objects to the Museum's permanent collection including Ancient Greek and Roman antiquities, Ancient Chinese sculptures, as well as work from modern artists including Henri Matisse, Edgar Degas, Joseph Stella, Georges Braque, Pablo Picasso and Joan Miró.

Over its history the Museum has expanded with the addition of the Stanley B. McCormick Gallery donated by his wife Katharine McCormick in 1942 and the Sterling and Preston Morton Galleries in 1963. Significant expansions came when the Alice Keck Park Wing opened to the public in 1985 and the Jean and Austin H. Peck, Jr. Wing in 1998. The Ridley-Tree Education Center at McCormick House, a center for art education activities, was established in 1991. The newly renovated Park Wing Entrance and Luria Activities Center opened in June 2006.

Beginning in Summer 2016, the SBMA embarked on the largest renovation in its history addressing critical needs of the building including: seismic retrofitting, new storage and conservation space, new roof and mechanical systems, new art receiving facility and an increase in overall gallery space. The renovation was designed by the Santa Barbara firm Kupiec Architects. The total cost of the master plan, which involves extensive improvements for the museum’s 1914 building and the re-installation of its collection, was initially projected at $50 million.

In 2023, Amada Cruz was appointed as the Director and CEO of the museum, succeeding Larry J. Feinberg. Shortly after Amada Cruz became Director in October 2023, she cancelled Three American Painters: Then and Now, a major exhibition with over 62 works, citing the aim of making the museum "more inclusive and more reflective of Santa Barbara County’s diverse community." Chief Curator Eik Kahng conceived the exhibit as a reimagining of art historian Michael Fried’s 1965 show Three American Painters, considered a precursor to Fried's 1967 historical essay "Art and Objecthood." The SBMA exhibit, years in the making, was to open summer 2024. Eik Kahng was dismissed and Cruz appointed herself to Kahng’s position. According to Santa Barbara Independent Cruz's "tenures at previous institutions were punctuated by controversy," including at the Phoenix Art Museum. SBMA did not provided a reason for Kahng's termination.

== Permanent collection ==
The Museum's 60,000 square feet (5,600 m^{2}) includes exhibition galleries, a store, a 154-seat auditorium, a library containing 50,000 books and 55,000 slides, a Family Resource Center dedicated to participatory interactive programming and an 11,500-square-foot off-site facility, the Ridley-Tree Education Center at McCormick House.

SBMA's permanent collection includes more than 27,000 works of art, including paintings, sculpture, prints, drawings, photographs, ceramics, glass, jades, bronzes, lacquer and textiles. These works represent the arts of Asia, Europe and the Americas spanning over 5,000 years of human history. Particular strengths of the permanent collection include:

- 19th-century French art (Barbizon School, Impressionism, Post-Impressionism)
- 19th and 20th-century American art (paintings and works on paper)
- Contemporary Regional art (20th-century and 21st-century California artists to the present)
- Western Pacific Rim photography (contemporary Chinese, Japanese, Korean)
- Buddhist art (Chinese, Japanese, Tibetan, Indian)

== Exhibitions ==
SBMA presents shows of art and artists of the past, such as Degas, Leonardo, Picasso, Rothko, Van Gogh, Nam June Paik, Inge Morath and of living artists including Tatsuo Miyajima, April Street, Kehinde Wiley, and Peter Halley.

== Curatorial ==
The Santa Barbara Museum of Art maintains a diverse curatorial staff, including, Assistant Director and Chief Curator Eik Kahng, Curator of Contemporary Art James Glisson., Curator of Asian Art Susan Tai, and Curator of Photography and New Media Charlie Wylie.

=== Looted art ===
In 2023, the Santa Barbara Museum of Art agreed to restitute a drawing by Egon Schiele, "Portrait of the Artist’s Wife, Edith," which had been looted by the Nazis and later donated to the museum by one of its founders, Wright Ludington. It was the object of a lawsuit filed in 2022 against the museum and an investigation by New York authorities because it was sold in the USA through Otto Kallir's New York gallery St. Etienne "with no provenance whatsoever." This decision followed after seventeen years of concerted efforts by the heirs of Holocaust victim Fritz Grünbaum and intervention by the Manhattan District Attorney. The drawing, not displayed for decades, was returned to Grünbaum's heirs, acknowledging the wrongful acquisition under Nazi persecution. The museum, recognizing the need to correct historical wrongs, participated in this restitution to help close a painful chapter for the heirs.
