= Casey Kaplan =

Contemporary art gallery in New York City

Coordinates: 40°44′49.41″N 74°0′22.83″W

Casey Kaplan is a contemporary art gallery in New York City, in the United States.

== History ==
The gallery was founded in 1995 in a 500 sq ft (46 m^{2}), one-room space located on the upper floor of a cast iron loft building on Broadway, before moving to Greene Street in 1997. The gallery relocated in 2000 to a store-front gallery space in Chelsea / Meatpacking District on 14th Street. During this time, Casey Kaplan hosted the first ever New York solo exhibitions of many now canonized contemporary artists, such as Jason Dodge, Jonathan Monk and Simon Starling.

The gallery expanded once more in 2005 to a larger store-front on 21st street, before relocating in 2015 to our current 10,000 sq ft (930 m^{2}), two-story space in the Flower District. Solo exhibitions in the new space have been staged by Kevin Beasley, Jordan Casteel, Mateo López, and Matthew Ronay, and the distinguished Turin-based abstract painter Giorgio Griffa, whose work had not been shown in New York since the 1970s.

== Artists ==
Casey Kaplan Gallery represents several living artists, including:

- Igshaan Adams
- Kevin Beasley
- Jeff Burton
- Sydney Cain
- Nathan Carter
- Jordan Casteel (since 2016)
- Jason Dodge
- Judith Eisler (since 2017)
- Jonathan Gardner
- Liam Gillick
- Giorgio Griffa
- David Huffman
- Brian Jungen
- Caroline Kent
- Cindy Ji Hye Kim
- Hannah Levy (since 2019)
- Mateo López
- Jonathan Monk
- The Estate of Marlo Pascual
- Diego Perrone
- Kaveri Raina
- Matthew Ronay (since 2017)
- Simon Starling
- David Thorpe
- Johanna Unzueta
- Ella Walker
- Garth Weiser
- Amanda WIlliams

The gallery has in the past also represented the following:

- Trisha Donnelly
- Sarah Crowner
- N. Dash (since 2015)
- Jason Dodge
- Haris Epaminonda
- Geoffrey Farmer
- Hugh Scott-Douglas

== Art Fairs ==
The gallery has exhibited at the ADAA Art Show (New York, NY); Art Basel (Basel, Switzerland);, Art Basel Paris, Art Basel Miami Beach (Miami Beach, Florida); Frieze LA (Los Angeles, CA); Frieze New York (New York, NY); and Frieze London (London, UK).
