= Andrea Bellini (curator) =

Italian contemporary art curator

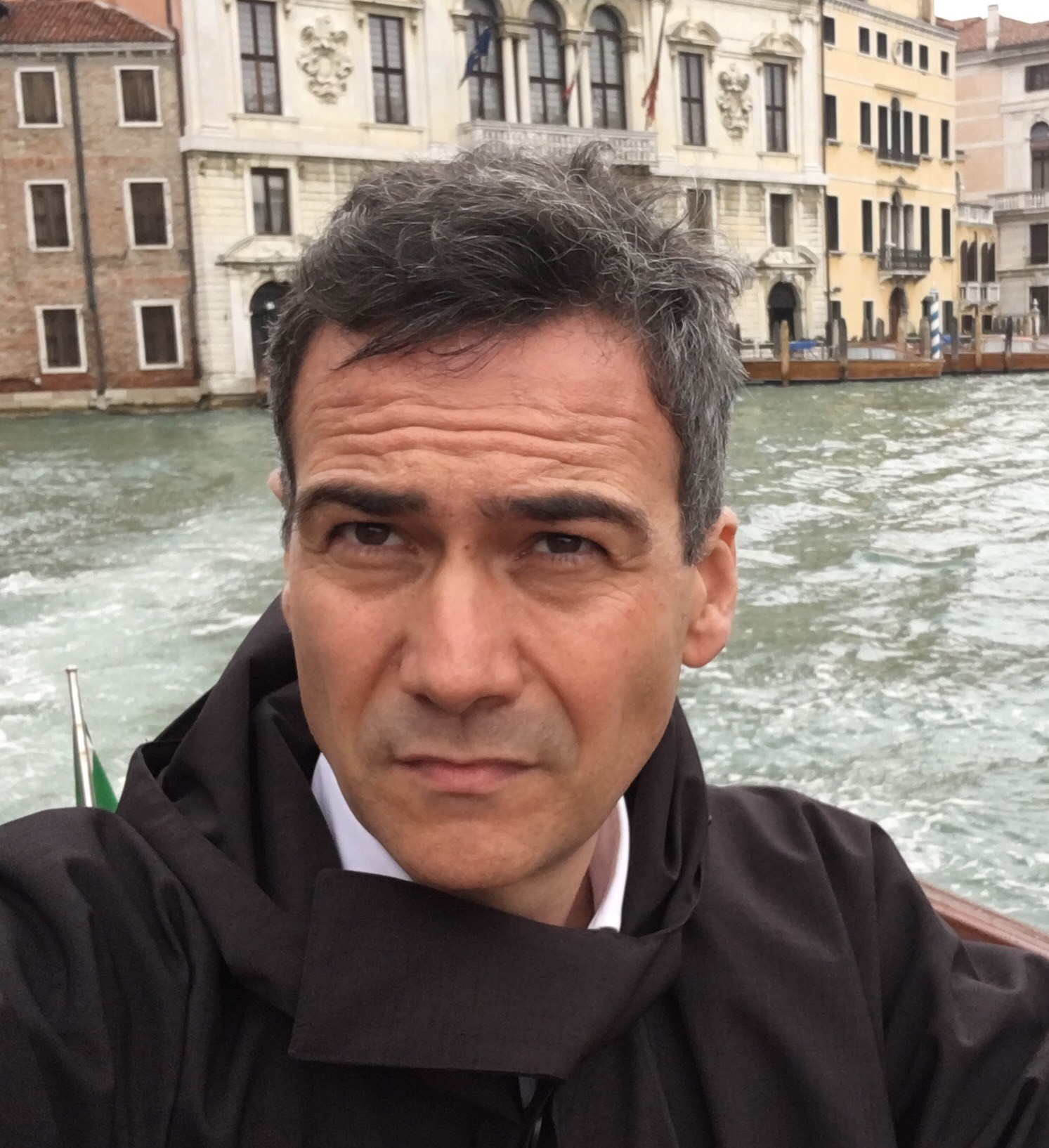
- Andrea Bellini on a boat in Venice
- Born: 1971 (age 54–55)
- Occupation: Art curator

Andrea Bellini (born October 9, 1971) is an Italian and Swiss curator and contemporary art critic based in Geneva, Switzerland. Since 2012, he is director of the Centre d'Art Contemporain Genève, and artistic director of the Biennial of Moving Images (Biennale de l'Image en Mouvement).

== Life and work ==
Andrea Bellini holds a degree in Philosophy (1996), and a postgraduate diploma in Archaeology and History of Art, University of Siena (2002). From 2004 to 2007, he was US editor of Flash Art magazine, based in New York City.

In 2007 he was named director of Artissima. Beatrix Ruf, director of the Stedelijk Museum, interviewed by Frieze Magazine chose Andrea Bellini's Artissima as one of the most important events world-wide in 2008. In 2009, in the context of Artissima, he organized the events program "Accecare l'ascolto / Aveugler l'écoute / Blinding the ears", focusing on a single theme: the interaction between the visual arts and theater.

From 2007 to 2009 he was hired by Alanna Heiss as curatorial advisor of MoMA PS1, where he organized several shows, including the retrospective of Gino De Dominicis.

From 2009 to 2012 he was co-director of the Castello di Rivoli with Beatrice Merz, devising interdisciplinary cultural events, and personally curating group and solo exhibitions, including the first Italian museum show of Thomas Schütte "Frauen" and the first retrospective in Europe of John McCracken (2011). Other exhibitions include the solo shows of Piero Gilardi "Collaborative Effects 1963-1985" (Castello di Rivoli, 2012; Van Abbemuseum, Eindhoven, 2012–13; Nottingham Contemporary, 2013) – and of Luigi Ontani "RivoltArteAltrove" (Castello di Rivoli, 2011–12; Le Consortium, Dijon, 2012; Kunsthalle Bern, 2012), of Philippe Parreno (2010) and of Andro Wekua (2011).

In 2013, he curated solo shows by Gianni Piacentino and Pablo Bronstein at Centre d'Art Contemporain Genève. In the following years he organized solo exhibitions and performances by Marina Abramović, Joachim Koester, Charles Atlas, Genesis P-Orridge, Nicole Miller, Raphael Hefti, Sonia Kacem, Steven Claydon, Ernie Gehr, Robert Overby, and Giorgio Griffa. Daniel Birnbaum, director of the Moderna Museet in Stockholm, listed Giorgio Griffa's solo show as one of the ten most interesting shows worldwide in 2015 in Artforum. In 2017 he curated the first mid-career retrospective of Italian artist Roberto Cuoghi.

In 2014 he curated his first Biennial of Moving Images with Hans-Ulrich Obrist and Yann Chateigné, proposing a new format: the works presented are commissioned and produced by the Centre d'Art Contemporain Genève for the occasion. The second edition of the Biennial of Moving Images under his artistic direction took place between November 2016 and January 2017, it was this time co-curated by Cecilia Alemani, Caroline Bourgeois and Elvira Dyangani Ose. In the context of the Biennial of Moving Images, works by Sophia Al Maria, Karimah Ashadu, Ed Atkins, Alexandra Bachzetsis, Marie Kølbæk Iversen, Donna Kukama, Salomé Lamas, Arvo Leo, Andrew Hardwidge, Isabelle Lewis, Heather Phillipson, James Richards, Tracey Rose, Jeremy Shaw, Wu Tsang, Emily Wardill, Emilie Jouvet, Bodil Furu, Phoebe Boswell, Pauline Boudry / Renate Lorenz were commissioned and produced. Writing in Frieze about the 2016 edition of the Biennial, art critic Pablo Larios stated that the Biennial of Moving Images accounts "(…) too, for video as a political tool: a handy, accessible, democratic (or anti-democratic) medium of forensics and surveillance, reportage and testament – and, increasingly, an inexpensive form now making filmmakers of amateur-experts across the world. It is in this broad and global sense that the Biennale of Moving Images excelled."

In 2017, he curated "From Concrete to Liquid to Spoken Worlds to the Word", an exhibition that explores the emancipation of language through historical and contemporary positions, from the earliest typographic and sound works of concrete poets to poetic experiments in the digital era. Extending his researches on writing and scriptures in contemporary art, he co-curated in 2020 "Scrivere Disegnando. When Language Seeks Its Other", an exhibition about writing and its shadow side, looking back over a number of practices, from the early twentieth century to the present day, in which writing leaves the function of communication behind and moves into the sphere of the illegible and unspeakable. As the very first collaborative project between the Collection de l'Art Brut in Lausanne and a contemporary art institution, this exhibition brought together a diverse range of personalities: from "outsider" artists, some of whom carried out their work while institutionalized, all the way to "official" artists, some of whom played key roles in twentieth-century avant-garde and neo-avant-garde movements.

He is the curator of the Swiss pavilion at the 60th International Art Exhibition – 2024 Venice Biennale.

Andrea Bellini is the president of the artistic committee of MIRE, an artistic programme, unprecedented in its scope, for the dissemination of works of moving images in the railway stations of the commuter rail network Léman Express.

Andrea Bellini is member of CERN's Cultural Advisory Board, the Scientific Committee of Museo d'Arte Contemporanea Donnaregina (MADRE) in Naples, the Acquisitions Committee of NMNM Nouveau Musée National de Monaco; the Advisory Committee of Arthub, Shanghai and the academic council of HEAD in Geneva. He has also been visiting professor at IULM University of Milan, École cantonale d'art de Lausanne and University of Zurich.

== Selected publications ==
As editor

- Chrysalis: The Butterfly Dream, LENZ, Milano, 2023
- Artists' Survival Kit, (co-edited with Göksu Kunak), NERO, Rome, 2022
- From Concrete to Liquid to Spoken Worlds to the Word, NERO, Rome, 2022
- BIM'21. A Goodbye Letter, A Love Call, A Wake-Up Song, LENZ, Milano, 2022
- Psicoenciclopedia possibile, an exhibition of Gianfranco Baruchello, Motto Books, Berlin/Lausanne, 2021
- Lemaniana, Motto Books, 2021
- Poems I Will Never Release: Chiara Fumai 2007-2017, (co-edited with Francesco Urbano Ragazzi, Milovan Farronato), NERO Editions, 2021
- Writing by Drawing. When Language Seeks Its Other, Skira, 2020
- Biennale de l'Image en Mouvement 2018, Corraini Edizioni, Turin, 2019
- Hreinn Friðfinnsson, Works 1964–2019, Koenig Books, London, 2019
- Centre d'Art Contemporain Genève, 1974-2017, Les Presses du Réel, Genève, 2017
- Roberto Cuoghi, PERLA POLLINA 1996-2016, Hatje Cantz, Berlin, 2017
- Steven Claydon, Mousse Publishing, Milan, 2017
- Biennale de l'Image en Mouvement 2016, Mousse Publishing, Milan, 2017
- Biennale de l'Image en Mouvement 2014, Mousse Publishing, Milan, 2016
- Giorgio Griffa, WORKS 1965-2015, Mousse Publishing, Milan, 2015
- Robert Overby, Works 1969-1987 (co-edited with Alessandro Rabottini), Mousse Publishing, Milan, 2014
- Ernie Gehr, Bon Voyage, Mousse Publishing, 2015
- Pablo Bronstein, (co-edited with Pablo Bronstein), Walther König, Cologne, 2013
- Gianni PIacentino, JRP | Ringier, Zurich, 2013
- Facing Pistoletto, JRP | Ringier, Zurich, 2009
- Everything You Always Wanted to Know about Gallerists But Were Afraid to Ask, JRP | Ringier, Zurich, 2009

As Author

- "Le incredibili avventure di Gigetto e Charlotte", Read Red Road, 2024
- "Storie dell'Arte Contemporanea", Timeo, Italy, 2023
- "Chrysalis: The Butterfly Dream" in Chrysalis: The Butterfly Dream, Lenz, Italy, 2023
- "Artist Survival Kit" in Artist Survival Kit, NERO, Rome, 2023
- "Lemaniana, Reflections on Other Scenes" in Lemaniana, Motto Books, Switzerland, 2021
- "Alien Presences and Writing in the Work of Chiara Fumai" in Poems I will Never Release. Chiara Fumai 2007-2017, Nero Editions, Italy, 2021
- "Roberto Cuoghi: On Immoderacy and the Loss of Proportion" in Roberto Cuoghi, PERLA POLLINA 1996-2016, Hatje Cantz, Berlin, 2017
- "Steven Claydon" (Interview) in Steven Claydon, Mousse Publishing, Milan, 2017
- "Rethinking the Format. The New Biennale de l'Image en Mouvement" in Biennale de l'Image en Mouvement 2014, Mousse Publishing, Milan, 2016
- "Of the Standard and the Random: Time, Memory, Sign" in Giorgio Griffa, WORKS 1965-2015, Mousse Publishing, Milan, 2015
- "Ernie Gehr" (Interview) in Ernie Gehr, Bon Voyage, Mousse Publishing, 2015
- "Beyond Cinema: An Exhibition of the Recent Works of Ernie Gehr" in Ernie Gehr, Bon Voyage, Mousse Publishing, 2015
- "Less Is a Bore: Robert Overby the Heretic", in Robert Overby, Works 1969-1987 (co-edited with Alessandro Rabottini), Mousse Publishing, Milan, 2014
- "Pablo Bronstein" (Interview) in Pablo Bronstein, (co-edited with Pablo Bronstein), Walther König, Cologne, 2013
- "Mechanical Cosmogonies", in Gianni PIacentino, JRP | Ringier, Zurich, 2013
- "Disse e si contraddisse", Domus, no. 929, October 2009
- "Michelangelo Pistoletto", Kaleidoscope insert, no. 3, September–October 2009
- Paolo Mussat Sartor, Luoghi d'arte e di artisti. 1968-2008, exhibition catalogue, Palazzo Cavour, Turin, 2008, JRP | Ringier, Zurich, 2008
- Collecting Contemporary Art, JRP | Ringier, Zurich, 2008
- "S.N.O.W.. La scultura come teorema", in S.N.O.W. Sculpture in a Non-Objective Way (exhibition catalogue), Hopefulmonster, Turin, 2006
- "Conrad Shawcross studio in London", in Conrad Shawcross, The Steady States, (exhibition catalogue) National Museum, Liverpool, 2006
- Stefania Galegati, group catalogue, MoMa PS1, New York, July, 2005
- "51st Venice Biennale", Flash Art International, no. 243, 2005
- "Greater New York", Flash Art International, no. 243, 2005
- "Thomas Demand" (Interview), Flash Art International, no. 242, 2005
- "New York Tales", Flash Art International, no. 242, 2005
- "The East Village Revisited", Flash Art International, no. 241, 2005
- "Paul Chan" (Interview), Flash Art International, no. 241, 2005
- "An Interview with Maurizio Cattelan", Sculpture Magazine, no. 7, 2005
- "Sui destini della scultura nella civiltà delle immagini", in Cover Theory, ed. Marco Senaldi, Libri Scheiwiller, Milan, 2003
- Arte, Architettura, Città. Forum progetti e altro, catalogue of the exhibition at the Palazzo delle Esposizioni, Prospettive edizioni, Rome 2003
- The Book of Piero Golia, Artisart, Geneva, (collected writings), 2003
- "Cecily Brown", Flash Art Italia, no. 242, 2003
- "Ricordo di Emilio Villa", Flash Art Italia, no. 240, 2003
- "Cosa Arcana e Stupenda", Scultura italiana contemporanea, Silvana editoriale, Milan, 2001
- "Golia e la goliardia", Il Giornale dell'Arte, October, 2001
- "Meglio in gruppo che in comitiva", Il Giornale dell'Arte, February, 2001
- "Giuseppe Gabellone", Sculpture Magazine, no. 6, 2001
- "Paul McCarthy", Cioccolato amaro, Il Giornale dell'Arte, no. 194, 2000
