= Am Yisrael Chai =

Jewish solidarity slogan

Am Yisrael Chai (Hebrew: עַם יִשְׂרָאֵל חַי [am jisʁaˈʔel χaj]; lit. 'The People of Israel Live') is a solidarity slogan to express the strength and solidarity of the Jewish nation and as an affirmation of Jewish continuity and identity, typically during times of heightened adversity. To this end, it has historically featured in Jewish music, literature, art, and politics.

The phrase gained popular use in 1965 when songwriter Shlomo Carlebach composed the song "Am Yisrael Chai" as the anthem of the Student Struggle for Soviet Jewry (SSSJ) movement. According to The Forward, the slogan ranks second as an anthem of the Jewish people behind only Hatikvah, the national anthem of Israel.

== History ==
=== Early Zionism ===
A version of "Am Yisrael Chai" featured in early Zionism, appearing as early as 1895 in a songbook. It was set to many different tunes, and printed with sheet music in Popular Jewish Melodies (1927). The slogan was also used in American Zionist publications such as The Mast (1917) and Haivri (1921).

=== Jewish solidarity ===
At the Second World Jewish Conference in 1933 to encourage and coordinate an economic boycott of the newly empowered Adolf Hitler and his Nazi Party, Hungarian-American rabbi Stephen Samuel Wise ended the event's final address by declaring to the crowd:

"We are prepared to defend ourselves against the will of Hitler Germany to destroy. We must defend ourselves because we are a people which lives and wishes to live. My last word that I wish to speak to you is this – our people lives — Am Yisrael Chai!"

In the songbook Songs of My People (c. 1938), compiled in Chicago, the song "Am Yisrael Chai" appears.

On April 20, 1945, five days after the liberation of the Bergen-Belsen concentration camp, British military chaplain Leslie Hardman led a Shabbat service at the camp for a few hundred survivors. Knowing it was being recorded by Patrick Gordon Walker of the BBC, a Jewish military chaplain proclaimed "Am Yisrael Chai, the children of Israel still liveth!" after the group sang Zionist anthem Hatikvah at the conclusion of the service.

BBC recording from Bergen-Belsen concentration camp
BBC recording from 20 April 1945 of Jewish survivors of the Bergen-Belsen concentration camp singing "Hatikvah", followed by the shout of "Am Yisrael chai!", only five days after their liberation by Allied forces.

The front of the stage of a concert in Munich (in 1945/1946) by the Ex-Concentration Camp Orchestra displayed the words "Am Yisrael Chai".

In 1948, American journalist Quentin Reynolds noticed that someone had carved "Am Yisrael Chai" into the Arch of Titus, an ancient Roman monument to the Roman conquest of Jerusalem during the First Jewish–Roman War, likely by a Palestinian soldier serving with the Allies during World War II.

The First NFTY Leadership Institute in the summer of 1948 was dedicated to the theme "Am Yisrael Chai—Israel Lives Again: The Implications of the State of Israel for American Jewish Youth".

=== Carlebach's "Am Yisrael Chai" (1965) ===
The phrase gained popular use in 1965, when Jewish songwriter Shlomo Carlebach composed "Am Yisrael Chai" as the solidarity anthem of the Soviet Jewry movement at the request of Jacob Birnbaum, founder of the Student Struggle for Soviet Jewry (SSSJ), a United States political organization that promoted the rights of Jews in the Soviet Union to emigrate to Israel. Carlebach and Birnbaum knew each other, and their respective grandfathers had met at the First Zionist Congress in 1897 in Basel. By 1965, Carlebach was already popular for his melodies put to Hebrew prayers, and Birnbaum reached out to him in the hopes of composing a song ahead of a planned major SSSJ rally in front of the Soviet Mission to the United Nations in New York on April 4, 1965.

While in Soviet-dominated Czechoslovakia, Carlebach wrote and first performed "Am Yisrael Chai" before a group of youth in Prague. On April 2, 1965, Carlebach phoned Birnbaum with news that the song was completed. Carlebach publicly performed the song for the first time at the April 4 SSSJ rally. The song became the centerpiece of the SSSJ's annual solidarity rally between 1972 and 1991. It is the final song of Soul Doctor, a Broadway musical about Carlebach's life.

Hebrew	Transliteration	English
עַם יִשְׂרָאֵל חַי (repeat 3x) עוֹד אָבִינוּ חַי (repeat 3x)	Am yisrael chai od avinu chai	The people of Israel live, our Father still lives!

The song's lyrics are derived from Genesis 45:3: "Joseph said to his brothers, 'I am Joseph. Is my father still alive?'" (הַעוֹד אָבִי חַי). Carlebach added the words "Am Yisrael Chai" (the Nation of Israel lives) and, for the song's refrain, changed the words "is my father still alive" to "our father is still alive" (עוֹד אָבִינוּ חַי) in a possible reference to the Jewish tradition that "Jacob/Israel did not die". According to German-American musicologist Tina Frühauf, Carlebach changed the reference from Joseph's father to God "as the father of the children of Israel".

== Contemporary use and legacy ==
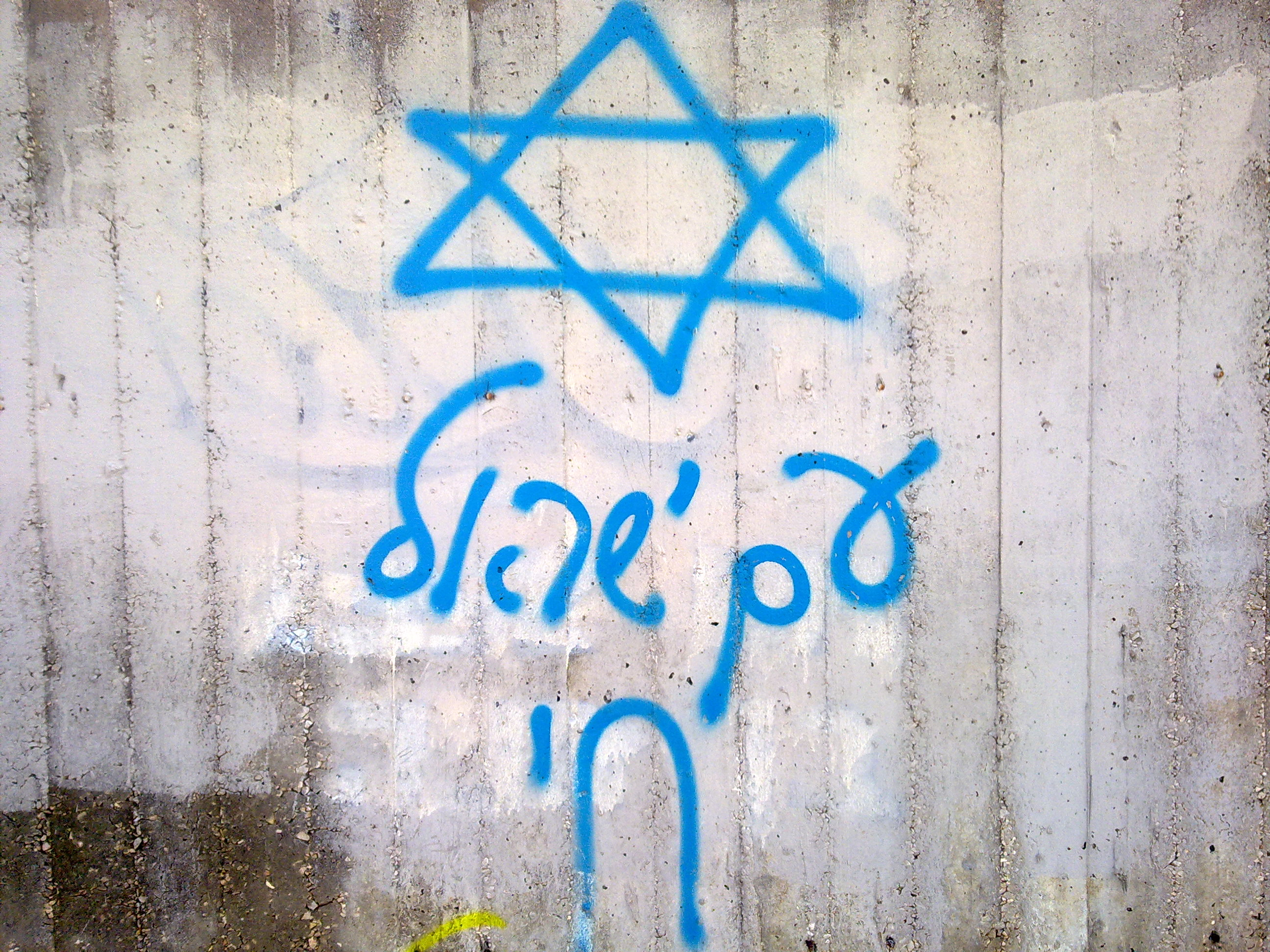
Graffiti in Tel Aviv, Israel, depicting a Star of David and "Am Yisrael Chai" written in Hebrew beneath it.

Jewish news organization The Forward placed "Am Yisrael Chai" second only to Hatikvah, the national anthem of Israel, as "an anthem of the Jewish people". Judaic scholar Arnold Eisen has called "Am Yisrael Chai" the "civil religion" of American Jewry.

The phrase and Carlebach's song has become a widely used defiant expression and affirmation of Jewish continuity, especially during times of war and heightened antisemitism. Jacob Birnbaum interpreted the song's dominant phrase to signify "a rebirth of Jewish life, including music" in the post-Holocaust world. According to musicologist Tina Frühauf, the song's lyrics evoke a sense of the Jewish nation, Jewish survival, and an affirmation of Jewish identity. Some tour groups visiting Masada shout "Am Yisrael Chai" to invert the emphasis on martyrdom and resistance at the fort; life is the point, according to Professor Theodore Sasson. The phrase is also chanted during the March of the Living, an annual student commemoration of the Holocaust.

After the 1980 Paris synagogue bombing, Howard Squadron of the Conference of Presidents of Major American Jewish Organizations stated to Alain de Rothschild, "We stand with you in this hour, knowing that we are one people sharing a single destiny. Am Yisrael Chai." Outside the courthouse after an Israeli court rendered a guilty verdict for John Demjanjuk in 1986, "Am Yisrael Chai" was sung along with Ani Ma'amin, a prayer which was sung in Nazi concentration camps. Professor Glenn Sharfman suggests that the trial and verdict symbolized both a remembrance of the past and a statement of the future. Egyptian-Italian journalist Magdi Allam proclaimed "Am Yisrael Chai" during his acceptance speech after receiving the Dan David Prize in 2006 for fostering understanding and tolerance between cultures. In 2009, Israeli prime minister Benjamin Netanyahu inscribed the words "Am Yisrael Chai" in the guestbook of the Wannsee Villa in Berlin.

It is often used by the Jewish diaspora to express support and solidarity with Israel. The song was sung on the second day of the Six-Day War in 1967, at the end of the Yom Kippur War in 1973, and after the October 7 attacks in 2023. Marchers at solidarity rallies in Europe after the 1991 Iraqi missile attacks against Israel chanted "Am Yisrael Chai".

In 2023, Ben-Gurion Airport in Tel Aviv unveiled a 50-meter-long mural titled Am Yisrael Chai that covers 4,000 years of Jewish history.

=== After the October 7 attacks ===
During a solidarity event after the October 7 attacks in 2023, US Ambassador to the UN Linda Thomas-Greenfield uttered "'Never again' is now. Am Yisrael Chai." Ten days after the attacks, Benny Friedman released a song called "Am Yisrael Chai" to capture the spirit of the Jewish people and launched the "Am Yisrael Chai" concert tour in January 2024 to promote Jewish unity and solidarity. Israeli singer Eyal Golan released a song also titled "Am Yisrael Chai" on 19 October, in which he sings about the return of the hostages and the solidarity and resilience of the Israeli people. Jewish a cappella groups Maccabeats, Y-Studs, and Six13 released "Avinu SheBashamayim" as a reaction to the attacks, ending with the words "Am Yisrael Chai".

After his release from Hamas captivity during the Gaza war hostage crisis, Edan Alexander wrote "Thank you, President Trump! Am Yisrael Chai!" as his first public message.

Israeli singer Yuval Raphael ended the performance of her song "New Day Will Rise" during the final of the Eurovision Song Contest 2025 with an "Am Yisrael Chai". During the final in 2026, Noam Bettan similarly ended the performance of his song "Michelle" by saying "Thank you Europe, toda raba, I love you all – Am Yisrael Chai."

== See also ==
- Jewish peoplehood
- Philosemitism
- Jai Shri Ram – Indic phrase meaning "Hail Lord Rama"
