= The Baayfalls =

Mural by Jordan Casteel in New York City

- Obstructed view of the painting along the High Line in February 2020
- Artist: Jordan Casteel
- Year: 2017
- Location: New York City (December 2019 – December 2020)
- 40°44′50.6″N 74°0′18.1″W

The Baayfalls is a 2017 painting by Jordan Casteel. The 1,400-square-foot mural is currently on display along Manhattan's High Line, in the U.S. state of New York, from December 2019 to December 2020. The painting depicts two street vendors (one male and one female); the woman's T-shirt reads, "I am not interested in competing with anyone. I hope we all make it."
