= Christian Hackenberger =

German chemist

Christian P. R. Hackenberger (b. Osnabruck, 1976) is a German chemist. He is a professor of Chemical Biology at the Humboldt University of Berlin and heads the research unit Biomolecule Modification and Delivery at the Leibniz Research Institute for Molecular Pharmacology. He is a co-founder of the Munich-based biotech company Tubulis.

== Life and education ==
Christian Hackenberger grew up in Damme. He attended the Gymnasium Damme, where he obtained his Abitur in 1995. After completing his civil service, he studied chemistry at the Albert-Ludwigs-Universität in Freiburg (1996–1998) and the University of Wisconsin-Madison (M.S. with Samuel H. Gellman, 1998–1999), with support from the German Academic Scholarship Foundation. He pursued his doctoral studies at the RTWH Aachen (2000–2003), where he worked under Prof. Carsten Bolm as a Kekulé Fellow from the Fonds der Chemischen Industrie. During this time, he also worked as an editorial assistant in scientific journalism for the WDR broadcast "Quarks & Co". From 2003 to 2005 he was a DAAD Postdoctoral Fellow at the Massachusetts Institute of Technology under Prof. Barbara Imperiali.

In 2005, Hackenberger founded his own research group at the Free University of Berlin in 2005 as an Emmy Noether Fellow. In 2011, he was appointed as W2 Professor of Bioorganic Chemistry at the Free University of Berlin as the first Plus 3 awardee from the Boehringer Ingelheim Foundation. In 2012, he became Leibniz-Humboldt Professor for Chemical Biology at the Leibniz Research Institute for Molecular Pharmacology and the Humboldt University of Berlin. In 2020, Hackenberger co-founded the Munich-based biotechnology company Tubulis, which specializes in developing antibody-drug conjugates. He has served as associate editor of the Royal Society of Chemistry's scientific journals Organic and Biomolecular Chemistry (2015–2023) and Chemical Science (since 2024). Hackenberger lives in Berlin, and is married to the art historian Michel Otayek.

== Research ==
Hackenberger's research at the Leibniz Research Institute focuses on chemical strategies to functionalize proteins and antibodies using highly selective chemical reactions to generate protein-based therapeutics against cancer, Alzheimer's and viral infections. A particular focus of Hackenberger's research group is the engineering of new reactions for the modification and cellular delivery of proteins and antibodies to advance their use in biological and pharmacological research.

== Awards ==
Hackenberger has received numerous awards for his work, including the Heinz Maier-Leibnitz Prize of the German Research Foundation (2011), the ORCHEM Prize of the German Chemical Society (2012), the Zervas Award of the European Peptide Society (2018), the Breakthrough of the Year Award in the life sciences from the Falling Walls Foundation (2020), the Astra-Zeneca Award of the Royal Society of Chemistry (2023), the Xiaoyu Hu Memorial Award of the Chinese Peptide Society (2023), and the Max Bergmann Medal (2024).
