= Griffa =

Griffa is a surname. Notable people with the surname include:

- Giorgio Griffa (born 1936), Italian abstract painter
- Jorge Griffa (1935–2024), Argentine footballer
