= Hannah Levy =

American sculptor

Hannah Levy, born 1991, is an American sculptor known for her visceral work that combines organic and industrial forms into uncanny visages. She works mainly in steel and silicone, and focuses on the relationship of these materials to flesh and object.

Levy is represented by the Casey Kaplan gallery in New York City, where she lives and works. Her work was the subject of the solo exhibition Surplus Tension at the Arts Club of Chicago. Her piece "Retainer" was commissioned for the High Line in New York City in 2019, completed in 2020, and exhibited 2021–2022. Levy's work was included in the 2022 Venice Biennale.

Levy’s art concerns the human figure and how our bodies interact with the world around us. She takes everyday objects like medical equipment, vegetables, and furniture and defamiliarizes them using material and scale. Her work is quasi-sexual, meant to provoke an instinctual and at times humorous response. Her combination of sleek steel with fleshy, stretched silicone evokes Surrealist themes of the confusion between body and object. Her work also addresses the socio-political conflict between what structures appear to be and what they actually are.

== Early life and education ==
Hannah Levy was born in New York City, New York, in 1991. Her mother was an architect. As Levy grew up, she found herself interested in assistive/medical devices. She also volunteered at an organization that made cardboard furniture for children with disabilities, and considers herself to have been obsessed with furniture in general. In high school she was interested in industrial design, and her goal at the time was to create furniture.

Levy obtained her BFA in 2013 from Cornell University in Ithaca, New York, and her Meisterschüler title (Master’s) from the Städelschule in Frankfurt am Main, Germany in 2015. During her undergraduate studies, she pivoted away from furniture and instead began making sculptures that referenced utilitarian design. She started creating objects that referenced utilitarian objects but were meant to be looked at. Around this time is when she began incorporating silicone into her sculptures, casting ordinary objects into the material in order to create a relationship to the human body. The skin-like quality is meant to inspire tension and an uncanny sense of familiarity in the viewer.

== Career ==
=== Solo and Two-Person Exhibitions ===
- Bulge, MASSIMODECARLO Gallery, London, UK (2024)
- Crutch, Casey Kaplan, New York, NY (2023)
- Hannah Levy: MATRIX 280, Berkeley Art Museum and Pacific Film Archive, University of California, Berkeley, CA (2022)
- Surplus Tensions, The Arts Club of Chicago, Chicago, IL (2021)
- Retainer, The High Line, New York, NY (2021)
- Pendulous Picnic, Casey Kaplan, New York, NY (2020)
- Bone-in, Jeffrey Stark, New York, NY (2019)
- Panic Hardware, Mother’s Tankstation, Dublin, Ireland (2018)
- Swamp Salad, C L E A R I N G, Brooklyn, NY (2018)
- Gourmet Garden, Fourteen30 Contemporary, Portland, OR (2017)
- Shall we sit, stand, or kneel? with Michael Simpson (curated by Wills Baker), Marlborough Chelsea, New York, NY (2016)
- Hannah Levy, White Flag Projects Library, St. Louis, MO (2016)
- Live in yours, play in ours, Galerie Parisa Kind, Frankfurt, Germany (2015)
- Basic Essentials, Allen and Eldrige at James Fuentes Gallery, New York, NY (2015)
- Vegetative State, Galerie Parisa Kind Deuxième Bureau, Frankfurt, Germany (2014)

=== Group Exhibitions (Selection) ===
- Sclaraffenland, curated by Linda Schröer, Dortmunder Kunstverein, Dortmund, Germany (2024)
- Creatures of Comfort, curated by İdil Tabanca, Odunpazari Modern Museum, Eskişehir, Turkey (2024)
- Long Live Surrealism! 1924-Today, curated by Claire Howard, Blanton Museum, Austin, Texas (2024)
- Full Disclosure: Selections from the Thomas-Suwall Collection, Plains Art Museum, Fargo, ND (2024)
- This Isn’t Who It Would Be, If It Wasn’t Who It Is, Casey Kaplan, New York (2024)
- Moveables, Institute of Contemporary Art, Philadelphia, PA (2023)
- Shapeshifting: Or, Synonyms for Skin, curated by MFA candidate Mary Kathryn Felios, CCS Bard Hessel Museum, Annandale-on-Hudson, NY (2023)
- The Virtues of Rebellion: Modern and Contemporary Surrealisms, Phillips, New York, NY (2022)
- 51@51: Collected Works, Rennie Museum, Vancouver, Canada (2022)
- Manifesto of Fragility, 16th Lyon Biennale of Contemporary Art, Lyon, France (2022)
- 52 Artists: A Feminist Milestone, The Aldrich Museum, Ridgefield, CT (2022)
- The Milk of Dreams, curated by Cecelia Alemani, The 59th Venice Biennale, Venice, IT (2022)
- Women of Now: Dialogues of Memory, Place, & Identity, Green Family Art Foundation, Dallas, TX (2022)
- Where the threads are worn, Casey Kaplan, New York, NY (2021)
- The Dreamers / 58th October Salon, Belgrade Biennale, Belgrade, Serbia (2021)
- Indoor Dining, Marinaro Gallery, New York, NY (2021)
- The New Frontiers of the Contemporary, Fondazione Coppola, Vicenza, Italy (2019)
- Wege zur Welt (works from the Hildebrand Collection), G2 Kunsthalle, Leipzig, Germany (2019)
- I Campi Magnetici (curated by Cecilia Alemani), Gió Marconi, Milan, Italy (2019)
- Tissue, Company Gallery, New York, NY (2019)
- The Artist is Present (curated by Maurizio Cattelan), Yuz Museum, Shanghai, China (2018)
- Insane in the Membrane, Philara Collection, Düsseldorf, Germany (2018)
- After the Finish Line (curated by Helga Christoffersen), Galleri Susanne Ottesen, Copenhagen, Denmark (2018)
- I See You, SCAD Museum, Savannah, GA (2018)
- This Is Not A Prop, David Zwirner, New York, NY (2018)
- Keep Me Warm, C L E A R I N G, Brooklyn, NY (2018)
- Window Installation as part of Artsy Vanguard supported by Dior, Bergdorf Goodman, New York, NY (2018)
- Sit In, September, Hudson, NY (2018)
- Without God or Governance (organized by JAG Projects), Marinaro, New York, NY (2018)
- Summer of Love (organized by Sean Blott), Green Gallery, Milwaukee, WI (2018)
- Being There (curated by Mathias Ussing Seeberg), Louisiana Museum of Modern Art, Denmark (2017)
- Past Skin (curated by Jocelyn Miller), MoMA PS1, New York, NY (2017)
- Things I Think I Want. Six Positions of Contemporary Art, Frankfurter Kunstverein, Frankfurt, DE (2017)
- L’Institut d’esthétique (as part of La Manutention), Palais de Tokyo, Paris, France (2017)
- Touchpiece (curated by Justin Beal), Hannah Hoffman Gallery, Los Angeles, CA (2017)
- I Scream, You Scream, We All Scream for Ice Cream (curated by Clelia Colantonio), Fondazione Baruchello, Rome, Italy (2017)
- MIDTOWN (curated by Salon 94 and Maccarone), Lever House, New York, NY (2017)
- Tu es Métamorphose, Galerie Pact, Paris, France (2017)
- Faire L’andouille, Bahamas Biennale, Detroit, MI (2017)
- Laurel (organized by Laurence Dujardyn, Tatiana Kronberg, and Rosie Motley), Greenpoint Brooklyn, NY (2017)
- A Scream Runs Through the House, Helena Anrather, New York, NY (2017)
- Place of Heaven, Crush Curatorial, Amagansett, NY (2017)
- And the Dish Ran Away with the Spoon, 247365, New York, NY (2016)
- Dense Mesh (curated by Joshua Citarella), Carroll/Fletcher, London, UK (2016)
- Soft Costs_Money Over World. Wiesen (organized by Benedikte Bjerre), Kunstverein Wiesen, Wiesen, DE (2016)
- EVA (curated by Erika Ceruzzi and Zoë Field), Interstate, Brooklyn, NY (2016)
- Group Show, Rear Window, New York, NY (2016)
- A New Nootropic Lifestyler: Disease and Decoration, MX Gallery, New York, NY (2016)
- Rare Form, Mountain, Brooklyn, NY (2016)
- Parked Like Serious Oysters: Graduates of the Städelschule, Museum Für Moderne Kunst, Frankfurt, Germany (2015)
- Out of the Blue, Wellwellwell, Vienna, Austria (2015)
- Transitions, Fiebach Minninger, Cologne, Germany (2015)
- Ascend in Vain in the Rain ULO:1 curated by Weekends, Interstate Projects, Brooklyn, NY (2015)
- Bodies Zollamt, Offenbach, Germany (2015)
- Pretty Eyes, Electric Bills (curated by Amie Cunat), Fordham University, New York, NY (2015)
- Knotted Extensions, Basis, Frankfurt, Germany (2014)
- Independent Art Fair (organized by Brad Troemel), Untitled, New York, NY (2014)

=== Public Collections (Selection) ===
- Moderna Museet, Stockholm, Sweden
- Louisiana Museum of Modern Art, Humlebæk, Denmark
- National Gallery of Victoria, Melbourne, Australia
- Nevada Museum of Art, Reno, Nevada, United States
- Philara Foundation, Dusseldorf, Germany
- G2 Kunsthalle, Leipzig, Germany
- Fondazione Coppola, Vicenza, Italy
- Rennie Collection, Vancouver, Canada

=== Grants/Awards ===
- DAAD Study Scholarship for Fine Arts
- Cornell Department of Art Distinguished Achievement Award
- Cornell Council for the Arts Grant Recipient
