= Spacex (art gallery) =

Contemporary art gallery in Devon, England

Coordinates: 50.7201°N 3.5335°W

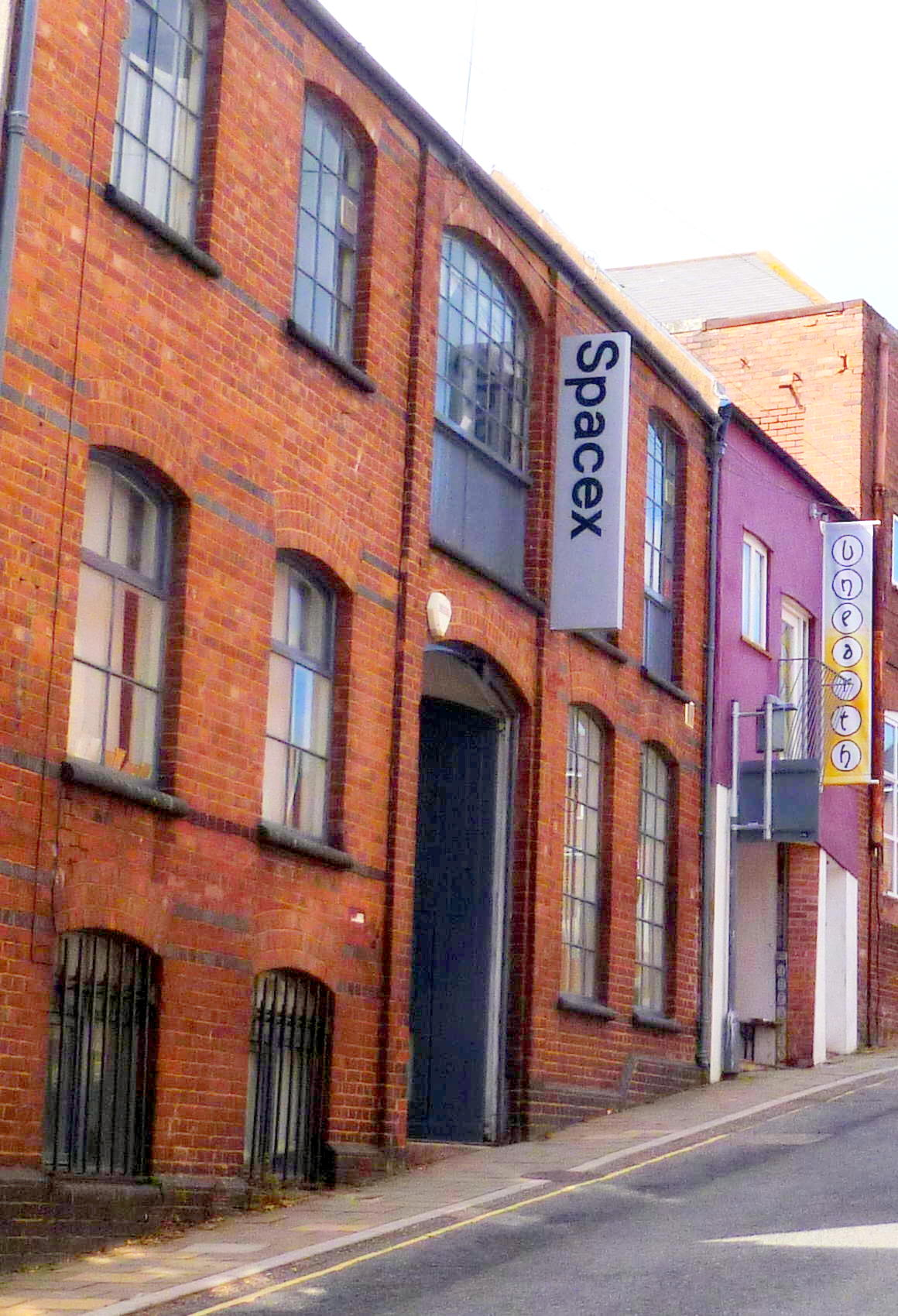
- Spacex, Exeter
- Established: 1974
- Dissolved: 2017
- Type: Contemporary art organisation
- Curators: Tom Trevor, Nicola Hood, Kathy Norris, Hannah Reeves
- Website: spacex.org.uk

Spacex was a contemporary art organisation, located in Exeter, between 1974 and 2017. It was founded in 1974 by John Butler as an artists' co-operative. Its programme encompassed installations, performance, photography, sculpture, painting, film and video. Its learning programme focused on helping visitors of all generations to explore and engage with contemporary art.

Spacex ceased activity at the end of 2017 with the formal closure of the charity.

== Origin and aims ==
Spacex was located in a converted 19th-century warehouse, midway between Exeter Cathedral and Exeter quayside. The original purpose was to offer affordable studio and exhibition space to local artists. In the early 1990s, Spacex became a registered charity and a publicly funded space showing contemporary art free of charge.

Collaboration was at the heart of Spacex. The gallery's role in working with innovative local, national and international artists has been recognised by the Arts Council. Spacex had typically put on 5-6 exhibitions a year, but in the 2010s began to adopt a more diverse approach including more events and more flexible use of the space by artists.

== Learning programme and events ==
Spacex's programme encouraged engagement with the latest developments in contemporary art through commissions, projects and activities. Work also took place away from 45 Preston St through artist-led projects, events and research. Spacex also had a significant learning programme, working with students from local schools and further-/higher-education institutions.

== Selected artists ==
- Sean Lynch: The Weight of the World 14 May-2 July 2016.
- Mathew Sawyer: White Male, 36 Years Old, Average Height, No Pets, Out of Shape and Anxious, 17 May–12 July 2014.
- Scott King: De-Regeneration, 4 October–22 November 2014.
- Anne Eggebert, Matthias Einhoff, David Ferrando Giraut, Polly Gould, Marja Helander, Uta Kogelsberger, Abigail Reynolds, Almut Rink, Emily Speed and Louise K Wilson - Topophobia (2012)
- Blast Theory (2011). Bless Practice.
- Salvatore Arancio (2011). An Arrangement of the Materials Ejected.
- Paul Rooney (artist) – Bellevue (2009)
- Random Acts of Art (2010).
- Theo Jansen (2010). Ventosa Siamesis.
- Emily Wardill (2009). Game Keepers Without Game.
- Simon Pope (2009). Carved From Memory.
- Laura Kikauka (2009). Celebration of Failure.
- Andre Stitt (2008). Substance
- Christiane Baumgartner (2008). Solaris
- Geoffrey Farmer – The Last 2 Million Years (2008)
- Dawn Mellor (2006). Vile Affections.
- Mika Taanila (2005). Hotel Futuro
- Phyllida Barlow (2005). Scape.
