= Whitney Young, Yonkers =

Coordinates: 40.9552°N 73.8763°W

Whitney Young is a neighborhood in the city of Yonkers, New York. It is identified with Whitney Young Manor (“Whitney Young”), a 195-unit multifamily housing development. It was originally constructed in 1973. The development is named after the American Civil Rights leader Whitney Moore Young (1921–1971). Community organizer Roy Echols and baseball great Jackie Robinson were also involved in its development.
