= Richard Aldrich =

Richard Aldrich may refer to:

- Richard Aldrich (music critic) (1863–1937), American music critic
- Richard Aldrich (artist) (born 1975), American painter
- Richard Aldrich (producer) (1902–1986), American producer
- Richard S. Aldrich (1884–1941), U.S. Representative from Rhode Island
- Richard W. Aldrich, American neuroscientist
- Richard J. Aldrich (born 1961), British political scientist and historian
