= Florence "Frankie" Adams =

American educator, social worker, and author (1902–1979)

Florence V. "Frankie" Adams
- Born: Florence Victoria Adams; July 9, 1902; Danville, Kentucky
- Died: August 29, 1979 (aged 77); Atlanta, Georgia
- Education: Knoxville College, New York University
- Occupations: Educator, author, social worker

Florence V. "Frankie" Adams (1902–1979) was an American educator and writer. She had a long career at the Atlanta School of Social Work spanning 1931 through 1964. She is known for her social activism and as the author of Soulcraft: Sketches on Negro-White Relations Designed to Encourage Friendship and The Reflections of Florence Victoria Adams.

== Biography ==
Florence Victoria Adams was born in Danville, Kentucky, on July 9, 1902. In 1925, she graduated from Knoxville College. In 1939, she obtained her master's degree in education from New York University.

In 1931, Adams joined the faculty of the Atlanta School of Social Work. She influenced the curriculum and content of group work on a national level as a member of the Committee on Group Work of the American Association of Social Work.

In 1964, Adams retired from the Atlanta School of Social Work, now called Atlanta University.

From 1965 to 1967, she worked for Economic Opportunity Atlanta, Inc. and from 1968 through 1970 she worked with Project Head Start.

Adams died on August 29, 1979, aged 77, in Atlanta, Georgia.

== Publications ==
- Women in Industry (1929)
- Soulcraft: Sketches on Negro-White Relations Designed to Encourage Friendship (1944)
- Some Pioneers in Social Work: brief sketches; student work book, with Whitney Young Jr. (1957)
- The Reflections of Florence Victoria Adams, a history of the Atlanta University School of Social Work (published posthumously in 1981)
