= Nicole Miller (artist) =

Artist who lives and works in Los Angeles, California

- Born: 1982 (age 43–44); Tucson, Arizona
- Education: California Institute of the Arts, USC Roski School of Fine Arts
- Known for: Video art

Nicole Miller (born 1982, Tucson, AZ) is an artist who lives and works in Los Angeles, California.

Miller uses film and installations to explore the transformative capabilities of the moving image to reconstruct interpretations of self and culture. Her videos focus on the interplay between preconception and reality in terms of African American identity. The result of her work transforms into a powerful storytelling tool wielded for the possible reconstitution of lost histories and identities.

== Life ==
Miller moved to LA in 2001 to attend the California Institute of the Arts and then obtained her MFA from the USC Roski School of Fine Arts.

In 2014 she had a solo exhibition at the Centre d'Art Contemporain Geneve. This was titled Death of a School. Her work, The Conductor, was featured at both the High Line in New York City and at LAXART in Los Angeles. Her work has also been featured at Kunst-Werke in Berlin.

Additionally, she has participated in major museum exhibitions such as Hammer Museum's Made in LA, The Bearden Project at the Studio Museum in Harlem, and Dallas Biennale at the Dallas Contemporary art museum. In 2014, Miller completed an 18-month project entitled "Believing is Seeing" with The Los Angeles County Museum of the Arts.

Miller's works have also been featured in the collections of the Los Angeles County Museum of Art and the San Francisco Museum of Modern Art.

Miller has also been the recipient of many awards. She received the Louis Comfort Tiffany Biennial Award in 2012, the Artadia Award and Rema Hort Mann Foundation Grant in 2013, the William H. Johnson Prize in 2015 and the Rome Prize in 2016.

== Work ==
=== The Conductor ===
Nicole Miller's most noted work “The Conductor” is a piece that speaks to a spectrum of emotion. The piece is silent, as an African-American man in a Jimi Hendrix t-shirt moves in a way such to act as if conducting a musical piece. The silence of the piece however, gives "The Conductor" another life, beyond just how you feel when you watch a man conducting silence. The silence creates a call back to silent movies, and even farther with the animation behind the man's movements it almost gives the piece a minstrel quality. Miller has said about the piece herself that "[she] became very excited by the prospect of having a figure of authority—a conductor—who is also a performer that refuses to be placed in any one instant of any recognizable character." This statement also sheds light to the idea that this piece is supposed to make you feel, and you could potentially relate it back to its minstrel quality, in that the minstrels of reconstruction, took away the identity of the African American people as whole, blanketing them as one group, and one way. But this piece is in a direct opposition to that America, as the Conductor refuses to be placed in one character, reclaiming power over self and the identity of a culture in a way. The idea that a conductor belongs within a structure can also be seen as a metaphor for culture. A lot of Miller's works speak to a self with in structure or as a part of a structure.

Overall Miller's works speak to ideas of race, and the place of racial history in today's world. Her pieces often have people speaking to past events, watching an event happen over something (a structure), or are a call back to the past in some way. All with deep roots in her African American culture, and ideas surrounding "self" and structure.
