= Whitney M. Young Sr. =

African American educator (1897–1975)

Whitney M. Young Sr. (1897–1975) was an American educator, from Kentucky. He was the father of civil rights leader Whitney M. Young Jr. (1921–1971), and the first African American director (1935–1966) of the Lincoln Institute, a school for African American students near Simpsonville, Kentucky.

Young was the president of the Kentucky Negro Education Association (KNEA) from 1948 to 1956, when the KNEA merged with the all-white Kentucky Education Association. He was also part of U.S. President Lyndon Johnson's Citizens' Committee for the Implementation of Civil Rights Law in 1964, a columnist for the Chicago Daily Defender newspaper, and an advisory board member of the Whitney M. Young Jr. Job Corps Center in Louisville, Kentucky.
