= Garth Weiser =

American painter

Garth Weiser (born 1979) is an artist based in New York City.

Weiser was born in Montana. He makes paintings which mix stark geometric patterns with textured paint surfaces. His work is a mixture of figurative and abstract imagery and references art and design from the 1980s and 1990s.

Weiser received his MFA from Columbia University School of the Arts in 2005, after receiving his BFA from Cooper Union. He is currently married to artist Francesca DiMattio.

== Notable exhibitions ==
2002

- Native, The House Gallery, Miami
- Collector's Choice, The Nelson Fine Art Museum, Tempe

2003

- New Paintings, Coos Bay Art Museum, Oregon

2004

- And One For Grandma, Capsule Gallery, New York

2005

- Folk Machine, Guild & Greyshkul, New York
- Greater New York, PS1 MoMA, Long Island City

2006

- Jessica Stockholder - Jedediah Caesar - Markus Amm - Garth Weiser, Galerie Nathalie Obadia, Paris
- The Manhattan Project, Frederic Snitzer Gallery, Miami
- The Difficult Shape of Possible Images, ZieherSmith, New York

2007

- Blackberrying, Galleri Christina Wilson, Copenhagen

2009

- Solo exhibition, Casey Kaplan gallery, New York

2011

- Solo exhibition, Casey Kaplan, New York
