= Margaret Buckner Young =

American educator and author (1921–2009)

Margaret Buckner Young (March 29, 1921 – December 5, 2009) was an American educator and author.

== Biography ==
The daughter of Eva Carter and Frank Buckner, Young was born in Campbellsville, Kentucky on March 29, 1921, and was educated in Aurora, Illinois and at Kentucky State Industrial College, receiving a bachelor's degree in English and French.

In 1944, Young married Whitney M. Young Jr. Young continued her education, receiving a master's degree in educational psychology from the University of Minnesota. In 1953, the couple moved to Atlanta where she taught educational psychology at Spelman College. In 1961, they moved to New Rochelle, New York, where she mainly concentrated on raising their two daughters; she also began her writing career.

After her husband's death in 1971, Young became involved in promoting racial equality and in improving relations between the United States and other countries including Nigeria, Yugoslavia and China. She also devoted herself to preserving her husband's legacy through the Whitney M. Young, Jr. Memorial Foundation, the National Urban League and other institutions. In 1973, she was a member of the United States delegation to the United Nations General Assembly.

Young moved to Denver, Colorado in 1990. She died there at the age of 88 from complications related to cancer. She had two daughters, Marcia Young Cantarella and Lauren Y. Casteel. Casteel became the first black woman to head a foundation in Colorado. Her grandchildren and great-grandchildren include Jordan Casteel.

== Selected works ==
- How to Bring Up Your Child Without Prejudice (1965)
- The First Book of American Negroes (1966)
- The Picture Life of Martin Luther King, Jr. (1968)
- Black American Leaders (1969)
- The Picture Life of Thurgood Marshall (1971)
