= Trisha Donnelly =

American artist (born 1974)

- Born: April 22, 1974 (age 52); San Francisco, US
- Education: Yale University
- Style: Photography, drawing, audio, video, sculpture, performance

Trisha Donnelly (born April 22, 1974) is an American contemporary artist who is particularly well known as a conceptual artist. Donnelly works with various media including photography, drawing, audio, video, sculpture, and performance. Donnelly is also a Clinical Associate Professor of Studio Art at New York University. She currently lives and works in San Francisco, California. Trisha Donnelly is represented by Galerie Buchholz, Matthew Marks Gallery, and Galerie Eva Presenhuber.

== Early life ==
Trisha Donnelly was born on April 22, 1974, in San Francisco. In 1995, Donnelly received a bachelor's degree in Fine Arts from the University of California in Los Angeles. In 2000, she attained a Masters in Fine Arts from Yale University.

== Career ==
Donnelly has been on the faculty at New York University's Steinhardt School of Culture, Education, and Human Development since 2008. She is a Clinical Associate Professor of Studio Art.

In 2012, Donnelly was the tenth artist to curate Artist's Choice, an exhibition curated by artists of artworks from the permanent collection of the Museum of Modern Art. In the exhibition, "she was after 'striking voices'" she couldn't let go of, "'paths of encounters and building poetic structures... images that go beyond images themselves."' The exhibition included works by artists such as Eliot Porter, Joe Goode, Gertrude Kasebier, Wendy Carlos, and John Whitney. The audio guide provided for the show was art historian Robert Rosenblum discussing MoMA's 1989 Picasso retrospective. Donnelly explained, "The feeling when listening to these audio guides was, this was a great work of art... or work of whatever, work of another entity, or another state and dimension, existing... [They] are so beautiful... It's like the Taj Mahal of languages, building it himself. By the end, I don't need the exhibition at all. I'm awash in this ocean of his funny, brilliant voice."

=== Select solo exhibitions ===
- Casey Kaplan gallery, New York, USA (2002)
- Air de Paris, Paris, France (2002)
- Casey Kaplan gallery, New York, USA (2004)
- The Wrong Gallery, New York, USA (2004)
- Kölnischer Kunstverein, Cologne, Germany (2005)
- Art Pace, San Antonio, USA (2005)
- Kunsthalle Zürich, Zurich, Switzerland (2005)
- Trisha Donnelly, Modern Art Oxford, Oxford, UK (2007)
- Trisha Donnelly, Institute of Contemporary Art, Philadelphia, USA (2008)
- The Renaissance Society, Chicago, USA (2008)
- Bologna Museum of Modern Art, Bologna, Italy (2009)
- Portikus, Frankfurt am Main, Germany (2010)
- Casey Kaplan gallery, New York, USA (2010)
- Air de Paris, Paris, France (2010)
- Les Rencontres d'Arles, France. Exhibition and Discovery Award laureate (2010)
- Galerie Eva Presenhuber, Zurich, Switzerland (2013)
- Artist's Choice, Museum of Modern Art, New York, USA (2013)
- San Francisco Museum of Modern Art, San Francisco, USA (2013)
- Serpentine Galleries (2014)
- Matthew Marks Gallery, Los Angeles, USA (2015)
- Serralves Museum of Contemporary Art, Porto, Portugal (2016)
- 2017 Wolfgang Hahn Prize, Museum Ludwig, Cologne (2017)
- Galerie Buchholz, Cologne (2018)
- The Shed, NYC (2019)
- The Drawing Center, New York, NY (2025)

=== Select group exhibitions ===
- The World as a Stage (2007)
- Venice Biennale (2011 and 2013)
- Documenta 13 (2012)
- One on One (2012 and 2013)
- Life Itself: On the question of what it essentially is; its materialities, its characteristics…, Moderna Museet, Stockholm, Sweden (2016)
- Less Than One, Walker Art Center, Minneapolis, USA (2016)
- Galerie Buchholz, Berlin (2017)
- In Tune with the World, Fondation Louis Vuitton, Paris, France (2018)
- Other Mechanisms, Secession, Vienna, Austria (2018)

== Public collections ==
Donnelly's work can be found in a number of public collections, including:

- Museum of Modern Art, New York
- Tate
- Walker Art Center
- Marciano Art Foundation (private collection open to public)
- Julia Stoschek Collection (private collection open to public)
- Pinault Collection at the Palazzo Grassi (private collection open to public)
- Fondation Louis Vuitton

== Recognition ==
In 2010, Donnelly was awarded with the LUMA Foundation Photography Prize.

In his 2012 Review "The Best of the Basement", critic Jerry Saltz recognized Donnelly as "a rare case of artistic love at first sight".

In 2012, Donnelly was awarded the inaugural Faber-Castell International Drawing Award by the Neues Museum.

In 2017, Donnelly was awarded the Wolfgang Hahn Prize by the Museum Ludwig. Suzanne Cotter, director of Mudam Luxembourg, said of Donnelly in recognition of the award: “Trisha Donnelly is without doubt one of the most compelling artists of our time whose work offers entirely new ways of experiencing and thinking about form, at once synaesthesic and disruptively transporting."
