= Lauren Y. Casteel =

African-American activist (born 1953)

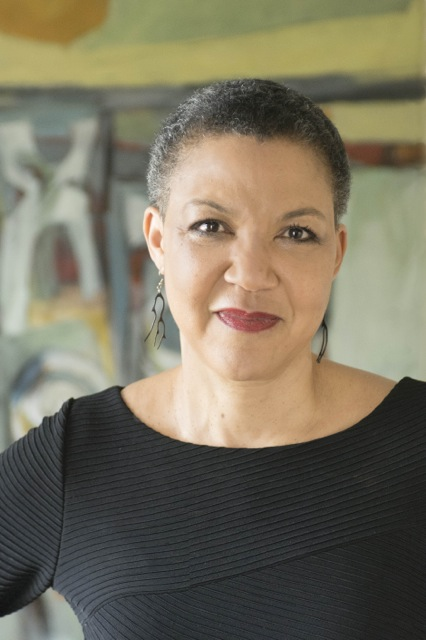

Lauren Young Casteel (born 1953) is an African-American activist who advocates for social justice. She was inducted into the Colorado Women's Hall of Fame in 2014.

The daughter of Margaret Buckner and Whitney M. Young, Jr., she was born Lauren Young in Nebraska and moved to Colorado when she was twenty.

She has led the Denver Foundation, the Hunt Alternatives Fund and the Temple Hoyne Buell Foundation. At the Denver Foundation, she instituted the Nonprofit Internship Program and the Nonprofit Inclusiveness Project; the second project received the Council on Foundations’ Critical Impact Award.

She was the first black woman to head a foundation in Colorado, the first female black TV personality in Colorado and the first female senior communications advisor to a Denver mayor.

== Personal life ==
She was married to Charles Casteel, an attorney. She is the mother of painter Jordan Casteel.
