= Richard Aldrich (artist) =

American painter

- Born: 1975 (age 50–51); Hampton, Virginia
- Known for: Painting

Richard Aldrich is a Brooklyn-based painter who exhibited in the 2010 Whitney Biennial.

== Early life and education ==
Aldrich received his BFA degree from the Ohio State University in 1999.

== Career and work ==
Richard Aldrich, Untitled, 2008, Oil and wax on panel, 19 5/8 by 13 1/2 inches (500 mm × 340 mm)

Although mostly abstract and casual, Aldrich's paintings also betray a distinctly literary sensibility, even as he targets what he has called the essential "unworldliness of experience." Snippets of text and random words-UFO, the numeral 4-appear as decals or pencil scrawls, while lines incised with the back of a brush suggest writing once removed. Taciturn pictures carry evocative and ungainly verbal appendages in the form of elliptical press releases or titles like Large Obsessed with Hector Guimard, 2008, a nod to the architect of Paris's Art Nouveau metro stations, or If I Paint Crowned I've Had It, Got Me, 2008, a telling paraphrase of Cézanne explaining he would be ruined if he tried to paint the "crowned" effect of a still life rather than the thing itself.

Aldrich's work encompasses a wide range of imagery, from richly textured abstractions in oil and wax to a primed canvas featuring a line written by British psychiatrist Henry Maudsley in 1918. This diverse imagery is complemented by Aldrich's natural interventions in the physical aspects of his paintings, such as cutting the canvas to create pockets or reveal the stretcher bars. He integrates his personal history and the human inclination to organize information through the formal language of painting, blending various artistic styles with humor and irreverence. Writer Raphael Rubinstein has linked him to the Provisional Painting movement, and he was featured in the 2010 Whitney Biennial. Aldrich's exhibitions highlight the shifting states from one piece to the next, reflecting his dynamic and evolving approach to art.

Richard Aldrich is represented by Gladstone Gallery, galerie dépendance, and Misako & Rosen.

== Selected bibliography ==
=== Book appearances ===
- Biesenbach, Klaus (2005). Greater New York 2005. P.S. 1 Contemporary Art Center in collaboration with the Museum of Modern Art. ISBN 0870709879.
- Yates, Sam; Brakke, Michael; Fyfe, Joe (2006). "2006 Artist in Residence Biennial (Exhibition Catalogue". Ewing Gallery of Art & Architecture.
- Nicklas, Bob (2009). Painting Abstraction: New Elements in Abstract Painting. Phaidon Press. ISBN 9780714849331.
- Bonami, Francesco; Carrion Murayari, Gary (2010). 2010: Whitney Biennial. Whitney Museum of American Art. ISBN 9780300162424.
- Navarro, M. (2011), Abstraction Racional
- Bazzini, Marco; Ferri, Davide (2013). The Inevitable Figuration: The Painting Scene Today. Silvana. ISBN 9788836626175.
- Hoptman, Laura, ed. (2014). The Forever Now: Contemporary Painting in an Atemporal World. Museum of Modern Art. ISBN 978-0870709128.
- Hudson, Suzanne (2015). Painting Now. National Geographic Books. ISBN 978-0500239261.
- Barliant, C. (2017). Richard Aldrich: MDD. Gladstone Gallery. ISBN 9780692860571.

=== Article appearances ===
- Bellini, A. "Paranorma Pittura," Flash Art Italia (2004)
- Saltz, J. "Dire Diary," The Village Voice (2005)
- Smith, R. "Menace, Glitter and Rock in Visions of Dystopia," The New York Times (2006)
- Klein, J. "Bunch Alliance and Dissolve," Art Papers (2007)
- Butler, C. "Looking Back: Emerging Artists," frieze (2008)
- Rothkopf, S. "Openings: Richard Aldrich," Artforum (2009)
- Fiduccia, J. & Holte, M.N. "New Abstract Painting," Kaleidoscope
- Kitamura, K. "Time Again," Art Monthly (2011)
- Nagoya, S. "September," Flash Art (2012)
- Moore, T. & Coley, B. "Bull Tongue," Arthur (2013)
- Eastham, B. "Painting is a Painting is a Painting," Elephant (2014)
- Caws, M.A. "Seeing it Now," The Brooklyn Rail (2015)
- Sutherland, C. "Richard Aldrich on the plurality of painting," The Japan Times (2016)
- Haddad, N. "Richard Aldrich's Elliptical Paths Through Language," Hyperallergic (2018)
- Tanaka, Y. "Abstraction: Aspects of Contemporary Art," The Japan Times (2019)
