= Francesca DiMattio =

American painter

Francesca DiMattio (born 1981) is an American artist born and based in Dumbo, Brooklyn in New York City. Her paintings and ceramic sculpture weave elements together with architectural, design, cultural, and historical references.

DiMattio grew up in the Chelsea neighborhood of Manhattan. Her mother was a college counselor and ceramist and her father was a vision scientist in the Physiology Dept. at NYU Langone Health in Manhattan. She attended NYC public schools including the Lab School and LaGuardia High School of Music & Art graduating in 1999. She received her BFA degree from Cooper Union in Lower Manhattan in 2003 and her MFA degree from Columbia University of the Arts in 2005. She lives and works in New York City and Hillsdale, New York.

== Career ==
DiMattio makes paintings combining sometimes disparate spaces using architectural, cultural and historical elements. Patterns, textures, and imagery combine to forge a logical cohesion from apparently separate and chaotic elements. Large mural works on canvas have been displayed in the Saatchi Gallery in London, Locust Projects in Miami, Salon 94 Bowery in Manhattan and the Institute of Contemporary Art, Boston.

In solo shows from 2014-2018 in New York City and London she introduced ceramic sculpture which aspires to the monumental via feminine strength and whimsy. She fractures and reconfigures a wide array of references including art history, children’s books, cartoons, pop culture, and craft. Though elements seem ready-made, in fact she sculpts and glazes everything by hand. Her sculptures are complex and multifaceted—each angle revealing seemingly endless experimentations in ceramic and glazing techniques. Throughout each assemblage, DiMattio’s layering and fragmentation map a crucial dialogue between cultures and styles, pointing to the plasticity of representation.

Through shifts in scale, elements that are typically accents become primary. Things do not behave as expected. Tiny figurines appear over scaled, floral motifs become viral, and torsos morph from flora and fauna. Through painting and the hybridization of art and craft she has introduced a dialogue with the past that has enlivened the contemporary world art scene. Her ceramic sculptures include monumental candelabras heavy with historical references suggesting the weight of ceramic styles on chaotic post-modern lighting and living. Her totems reference Greek Caryatids carried into a present rethinking of the weight women bear today. A large monstrous 9-foot tall piece, She-Wolf (2018), evokes W.B. Yeats’ poem, The Second Coming with its ending…”... what rough beast, its hour come round at last, Slouches towards Bethlehem to be born?”

The Caryatid works “exemplify this penchant for hybridity, each one encapsulating several oppositions between masculine and feminine, playful and serious, contemporary and ancient, high culture and low”(Fullerton). DiMattio takes traditional aspects of femininity and adds different components to the design of the sculpture.“Despite the show’s title, one was immediately struck by the fact that these figures had been liberated from their traditional role as architectural supports”(Fullerton). The layering in her work is not only visual but also figurative, for example the freeing of the caryatid can be looked at as freeing the female body of traditional view. DiMattio also creates paintings that “take architecture as their subject as a means to restructure the concept of space”(Saatchi). In her paintings Ladder and Broken Arch at the Saatchi Gallery,“elements collide into each other, become entangled, and co-exist—complicating our understanding of perspective and space. Her work seems to exist somewhere in between the abstract and the figurative”(Saatchi).

In Boston, DiMattio has transformed the Sandra and Gerald Fineberg Art Wall with a complex composition made up of five large-scale canvases. Drawing inspiration from the ICA’s dramatic architecture and waterfront setting, Banquet combines interior and exterior space and incorporates images of ships and the sea. In 2015, DiMattio designed a sculpture, Chandelobra, reflected her understanding of overturning the stereotyped image of chandelier that are related to feminine and deconstructing them into a unpredictable, explosive, and unfamiliar object (https://salon94.com/exhibitions/domestic-sculpture/). Another sculpture, Bloemenhouder (2015), DiMattio makes hundreds of porcelain and decorated them with flowers. The sculpture is overly occupied with ornaments and the floral decorations are viral, immersing the bottom of the sculpture representing how she achieves balance in beauty through destruction and abstract expression. Although some people consider her artwork to be deviant, her use of bold styles, glazes and design made audiences think outside of the box and ponder over the traditional way of beauty.

== Exhibitions ==
- 2005 – Paradise Lost, Marvelli Gallery, Chelsea, Manhattan; -First Look, Hudson Valley Center for Contemporary Art, Peekskill, New York
- 2006 – New Work, Salon 94 Bowery, Manhattan, New York; -The General's Jamboree- Guild & Greyshkul Gallery, Manhattan
- 2007 – Abstract America, Saatchi Gallery, London; -Unhinged, Laxart, Los Angeles; -True Faith, Greenberg Van Doren Gallery, Midtown Manhattan; -Killers and Their Hiding Places, World Class Boxing, Miami
- 2008 – November Again, Gallery, West Village, Manhattan
- 2009 – Futurescape, Contemporary Art Galleries, University of Connecticut, Storrs, Connecticut; -Master of Reality, curated by Joseph Wardwell, The Herbert and Mildred Lee Gallery, Rose Art Museum, Brandeis University in Waltham, Massachusetts; -Salon 94, New York Salon 94 Freemans, New York; -Decollage, Locust Projects, Miami
- 2010 – Francesca DiMattio, Sandra & Gerald Fineberg Art Wall, Institute of Contemporary Art, Boston; -Francesca DiMattio/Garth Weiser, The Suburban, Chicago; –Portugal Arte 10, Lisbon, Portugal
- 2011 – Bouquet, Conduits Gallery, Milan; -Extended Painting International, Prague Biennial, Prague; 8 Americans, Alain Noirhomme Gallery, Brussels; 4 Rooms, CCA Ujazdowski Castle, Warsaw, Poland
- 2012 – Francesca DiMattio, Table Setting and Flower Arranging, March 17 – April 21, 2012, Salon 94 Bowery, Manhattan, New York; -Modern Talking, Cluj Museum, Cluj, Romania; -Four Rooms, CSW Zamek, Warsaw
- 2013 – Vertical Arrangements, Zabludowicz Collection, London
- 2014 – Francesca DiMattio: Housewares, Blaffer Art Museum, Houston
- 2015 – Confection, Pippy Houldsworth Gallery, London; -Domestic Sculpture, Salon 94 Bowery
- 2018 – Boucherouite, Salon 94 Bowery
