= Giorgio Griffa =

Italian painter (born 1936)

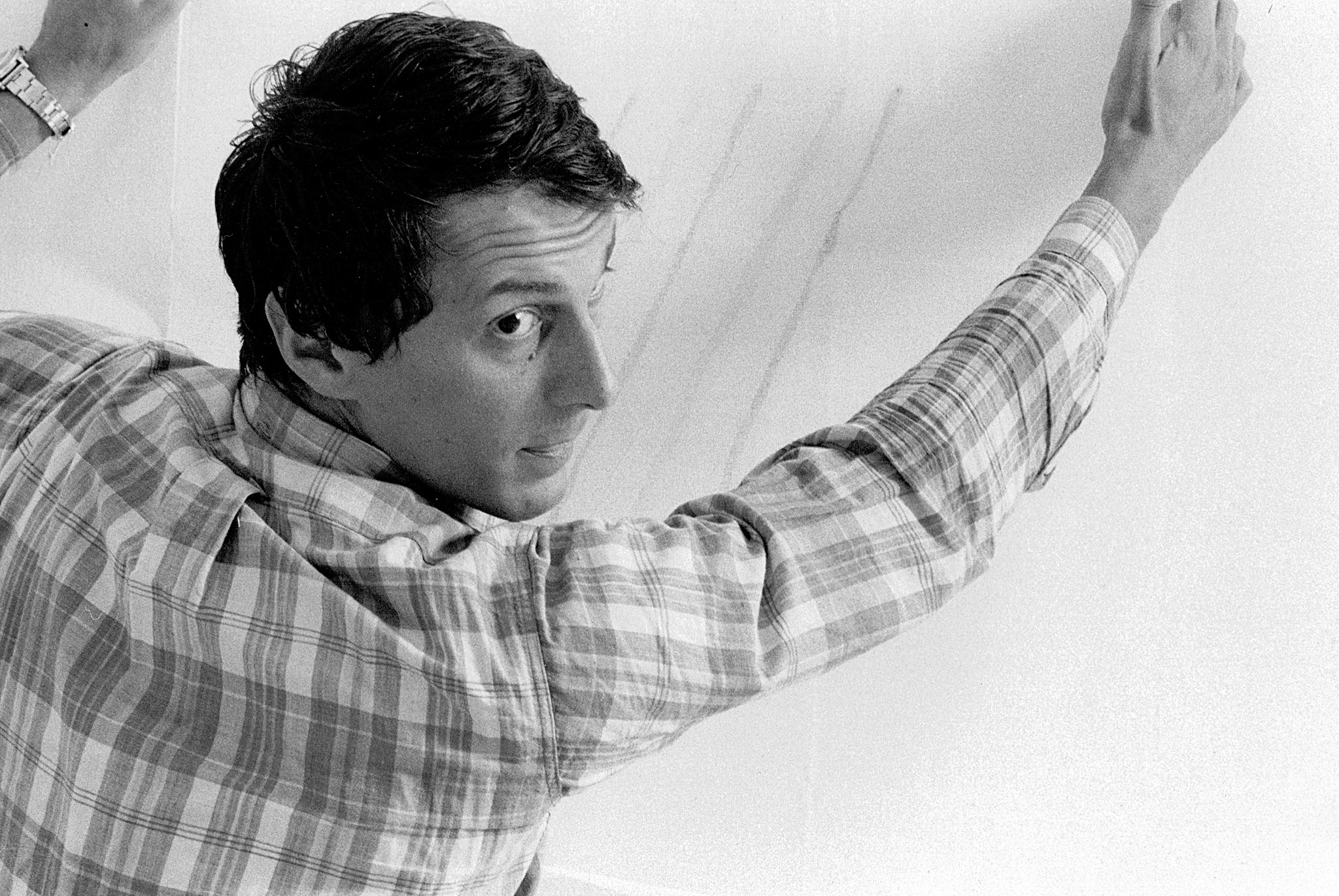
Giorgio Griffa 1970

Giorgio Griffa (born in Turin, 29 March 1936) is an Italian abstract painter living and working in Turin.

== Biography ==
Giorgio Griffa never received a formal art education. He began painting as a child, taking lessons from local painters at the Circolo degli Artisti in Turin.
After completing a degree in law in 1958, Griffa became a practicing lawyer.
In the sixties, Griffa began working as an assistant to the Italian painter Filippo Scroppo, a member of the MAC (Art Concreta) movement and a teacher at the Accademia Albertina in Turin.

== Work ==
In 1968, Giorgio Griffa abandoned figurative painting in favor of a format of abstract painting that still characterizes his work to this day. Painting with acrylic on raw un-stretched canvas, burlap and linen, Griffa's works are nailed directly to the wall along their top edge. When not exhibited, the works are folded and stacked, resulting creases that create an underlying grid for his compositions. In keeping with his idea that painting is "constant and never finished", many of his works display a deliberate end-point that has been described as "stopping a thought midsentence." Despite early associations with movements such as Arte Povera and Minimalism, Giorgio Griffa's work was not exhibited in the United States for 40 years after his first solo exhibition in New York at Ileana Sonnabend's gallery. In 2012, Giorgio Griffa had a solo exhibition, Fragments 1968 – 2012 at Casey Kaplan gallery in New York, leading him to be named one of the "10 thrilling rediscoveries from 2012." His exhibition was interrupted by Hurricane Sandy and later reopened in 2013. In her review of the exhibition, Roberta Smith wrote "His art deserves a place in the global history of abstraction".

== Exhibition history ==
Giorgio Griffa exhibited at Sonnabend gallery in New York in 1970 and participated in important international exhibitions such as Prospekt, Düsseldorf (1969 and 1974) and the Venice Biennale (1978 and 1980). Other important early exhibitions include Processes of Visualized Thought: Young Italian Avant-garde, Kunstmuseum Luzern(1970) and A Painting Exhibition of Painters who Place Painting in Question, curated by Michel Claura, Stadtische Museum, Monchengladbach (1973). Recent solo presentations of Giorgio Griffa's works include Uno and Due, Galleria Civica d'Art Moderna e Contemporanea, Turin (2002), Neuer Kunstverein, Aschaffenburg (2005), MACRO, Museo d’Arte Contemporanea, Rome (2011), Golden Ratio, Mies van der Rohe Haus, Berlin (2013) Fragments 1968 – 2012, Casey Kaplan, New York (2013) and Centre d'Art Contemporain Genève (2015). In 2015, To relieve the world, ABC-ARTE Genova, with the patronage of Genova Municipality]. A Continuous Becoming, Camden Art Centre, London (2018); Palazzo Collicola, Spoleto (2020-21); LaM - Lille Métropole Musée d’art moderne, Villeneuve-d’Ascq (2021); 'Luce buio', Xavier Hufkens, Brussels (2022); Centre Pompidou, Paris (2022); Villa Romana, Florence (2022); Castello di Mirandolo, San Secondo di Pinerolo (2024); 'Empatia', Xavier Hufkens, Brussels (2024)

== Permanent collections ==
- GAM, Galleria di Arte Moderna e Contemporanea, Turin
- Castello di Rivoli, Rivoli, Turin
- Galleria d'Arte Moderna, Rome
- Museo del Novecento, Milan
- Museum of Contemporary Art of Rome (MACRO), Rome

== Bibliography ==
- Paolo Fossati e Mario Bertoni, Griffa, Ravenna, Essegi, 1990. ISBN 978-8871891453
- Alberto Fitz, Giorgio Griffa. Segnando Pittura, Milano, Silvana, 2008. ISBN 978-8836612413
- Ivan Quaroni, "Giorgio Griffa : esonerare il mondo / to relieve the world", ABC-ARTE S.r.l, 2015, Bilingual edition 96 pages, Publisher: ABC-ARTE S.r.l, ISBN 978-88-95618-08-1, Dimensions: 26,5x19,2
