= Tina Frühauf =

German-American musicologist

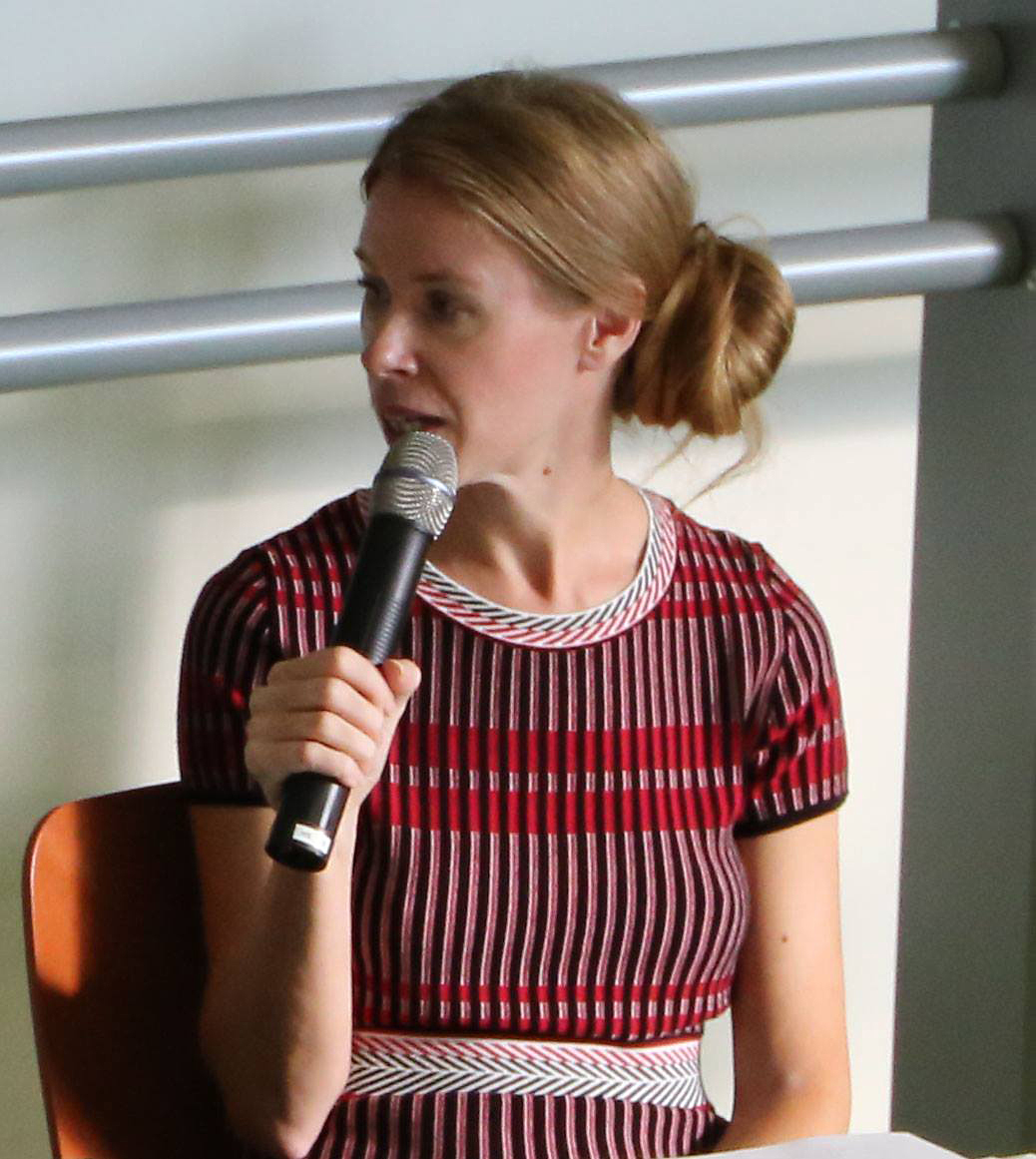
Tina Frühauf moderating a panel at the Gesellschaft für Musikforschung in Kassel, September 2017.

Tina Frühauf (born 23 September 1972 in Essen, Germany) is a German-American musicologist. She is adjunct associate professor at Columbia University in New York and serves on the doctoral faculty of the Graduate Center, CUNY. She is Executive Director of Répertoire International de Littérature Musicale. In January 2023, Frühauf was named director of the Barry S. Brook Center for Research and Documentation at the CUNY Graduate Center. Tina Frühauf serves on the board of the DAAD Alumni Association of the US.

Frühauf's teaching and research draw upon diverse methods and perspectives in scholarship to forge a broad and interdisciplinary musicology centered around history, performance, and ethnography. She is particularly interested in the interstices between music and religion. The study of Jewish music in modernity has provided a primary focus for research for two decades, and has provided the context for her more recent ventures into new fields of inquiry, that is, music and postmodernity and music and temporality. She has conducted research in Israel, Germany, and the United States.

Frühauf's research in the area of music and Jewish studies has been funded by the American Musicological Society, the Leo Baeck Institute, the Memorial Foundation for Jewish Culture, the German Academic Exchange Program (DAAD), among other organizations.

Her volume Dislocated Memories: Jews, Music, and Postwar German Culture (Oxford University Press, 2014), co-edited with Lily E. Hirsch, won the Ruth A. Solie Award from the American Musicological Society, and the Award for Excellence for an Edited Volume on Jewish Studies and Music, Jewish Studies and Music Study Group, American Musicological Society. Her book Transcending Dystopia, Music, Mobility, and the Jewish Community in Postwar Germany (Oxford University Press, 2021) was a finalist of the 2022 Jordan Schnitzer Awards of the Association for Jewish Studies, her 2023 essay "The Dialectics of Nationalism: Jaromír Weinberger's Schwanda the Bagpiper and Anti-Semitism in Interwar Europe," published in Cambridge Opera Journal, won the 2024 Deems Taylor/Virgil Thomson Award for an article in the concert music field.

In 2019, Frühauf has been DAAD Guest Professor at the Hochschule für Musik und Theater München, where she laid the groundwork for the establishment of the Paul Ben-Haim Center, which is devoted to the study of music before, during, and after Nazism. In the spring of 2023 Frühauf was a Senior Fellow at the German Historical Institute's Pacific Office at the University of California, Berkeley, carrying out research on music's intellectual migration.

== Publications ==
Books/Monographs/Editions

- Orgeln und Orgelmusik in deutsch-jüdischer Kultur, Netiva: Wege deutsch-jüdischer Geschichte und Kultur 6. Hildesheim: Georg Olms Verlag, 2005
- The Organ and Its Music in German-Jewish Culture. New York: Oxford University Press, 2009
- Salomon Sulzer: Reformer, Cantor, Icon / Salomon Sulzer: Reformer, Kantor, Kultfigur. Berlin: Hentrich & Hentrich, 2012
- German-Jewish Organ Music: An Anthology of Works from the 1820s to the 1960s. Middleton, WI: A-R Editions, 2013
- Hans Samuel: Selected Piano Works. Middleton, WI: A-R Editions, 2013
- Dislocated Memories: Jews, Music, and Postwar German Culture, edited with Lily Hirsch. New York: Oxford University Press, 2014
- Referencing Music in the Twenty-first Century: Encyclopedias of the Past, Present, and Future. Fontes Artis Musicae LXIII/3 (July–September 2016)
- Werner Sander, "To Finally Fortify Peace": A Vital Exponent of Jewish Music in the GDR / Werner Sander, "den Frieden endgültig zu festigen": Ein grosser Vertreter der jüdischen Musik in der DDR. Teetz: Hentrich & Hentrich, 2017
- Orgeln und Orgelmusik in deutsch-jüdischer Kultur, Netiva: Wege deutsch-jüdischer Geschichte und Kultur 6. Hildesheim: Georg Olms Verlag, 2017. [2nd revised edition]
- Experiencing Jewish Music in America: A Listener's Companion. Lanham, MD: Rowman & Littlefield, 2018
- Postmodernity's Musical Pasts. Woodbridge: Boydell Press, 2020
- Transcending Dystopia: Music, Mobility, and the Jewish Community in Germany, 1945—1989. New York: Oxford University Press, 2021
- Jüdische Musik im süddeutschen Raum / Mapping Jewish Music of Southern Germany. Munich: Allitera, 2021
- The Oxford Handbook of Jewish Music Studies. New York: Oxford University Press, 2023
