= Sarah Crowner =

American painter (born 1974)

Sarah Crowner (born 1974) is an American painter best known for her geometric abstractions that evoke the style of hard-edge painting of the 1950s and 60s.

== Biography ==
Sarah Crowner was born in Philadelphia, Pennsylvania in 1974. She received a Bachelor of Arts from the University of California, Santa Cruz in 1996 and a Masters of Fine Arts from Hunter College, City University of New York, in 2002. She also attended École nationale supérieure des Beaux-Arts, in Paris, France. Crowner lives and works in Brooklyn, New York.

== Work ==
Crowner creates paintings by sewing together angular pieces of already painted canvas and linen. This method emerged from her impatience with the medium. In an interview from an article from the New York Observer, Crowner states that "sewing made sense at first because it was a way of cutting up, collaging, reorganizing and re-constructing in a practical way."

== Career ==
In October 2012, she published her first widely distributed book, Format, through the publisher Primary Information. Her most recent publication, Sarah Crowner: Patterns (April, 2018) is her second project with Primary Information. ISBN 9780991558582

Crowner had work featured in a group exhibition, Painter Painter, which focused on abstract painting. This took place at the Walker Art Center (Minneapolis), and ran from February 2, 2013 to October 27, 2013.

Crowner's third solo exhibition, The Wave, ran from January 5, 2014 to February 2, 2014 at Nicelle Beauchene Gallery (New York). In 2016 she was commissioned to create an installation for the Solomon R. Guggenheim Museum which will remain until 2023.

Crowner was award the 2019-2020 Rome Prize in the category for visual art by the American Academy in Rome.
