= Jonathan Monk =

English artist (born 1969)

Jonathan Monk (born 1969, in Leicester, UK) is an artist living and working in Berlin.

== Life and career ==
=== Art practice ===
Monk questions the meaning of art using conceptualism in a way that Ken Johnson in The New York Times called "sweet, wry and poetic". Monk's work frequently questions (if not outright undermines) the art world's conventional means of controlling contemporary art's distribution and value. One example was when he gave an artist's talk for the Dia Art Foundation in 2014 and arranged for every attendee to receive a free Jonathan Monk collage, each of which had been placed on the venue's seating beforehand. Another example is the series Receipt Drawings in which he goes out to dinner and makes an original drawing on the receipt, which he then sells to the first bidder on his Instagram account for the price of the meal.

In an interview with David Shrigley, Monk says: "Is it or is it not or can it or can it not be? This is something that has been dealt with within the art world for some time and I guess the unanswerable question keeps us all going..."

== Art works ==
=== 2010 ===
"Diecimila" - Facsimile produced and published by mfc-michèle didier, Brussels

=== 2007 ===
"Deadman", selected for the Renaissance Society's 2007 group show, "Meanwhile, In Baghdad..."

== External sources ==
Lisson Gallery
Dvir Gallery
Frieze Magazine
New York Times Review Casey Kaplan Gallery
