= Jordan Casteel =

American figurative painter (born 1989)

- Born: 1989 (age 36–37); Denver, Colorado, U.S.
- Education: Agnes Scott College (BA); Yale School of Art (MFA)
- Occupation: Figurative painter
- Known for: Painting
- Awards: MacArthur Fellow

Jordan Casteel (born 1989) is an American figurative painter. She typically paints portraits of friends and family members as well as neighbors and strangers in Harlem and New York. Casteel lives and works in New York City.

== Early life and education ==
Casteel was born in Denver, Colorado, in 1989 to Lauren Young Casteel and Charles Casteel. She has a twin brother and an older brother. She was named after Vernon E. Jordan Jr, who succeeded her grandfather Whitney Young as head of the National Urban League and was a close family friend. Her grandmother was Margaret Buckner Young, an educator and children's-book author.

Artists Romare Bearden, Hale Woodruff, Faith Ringgold, Charles White, and Jacob Lawrence were significant influences while growing up.

Casteel studied at Lamar Dodd School of Art at University of Georgia in Cortona, Italy, in 2010 and graduated from Agnes Scott College in Decatur, Georgia, in 2011. She went on to receive her Master in Fine Arts in Painting and Printmaking at Yale University in 2014. She participated in several group exhibitions while at Yale, including 13 Artists, a historic show curated by then-classmate Awol Erizku.

== Work ==
After graduating from Yale, Casteel moved to New York City to pursue painting. Her first solo exhibition in New York, titled Visible Man, opened in August 2014 at Sargent's Daughters. The show featured several large-scale paintings depicting mostly nude black men seated in various spaces throughout their homes. The show explored the balance between sexuality and sensuality, both in her subjects and the viewers.

Casteel was selected as a 2015–2016 artist-in-residence at The Studio Museum in Harlem, New York, alongside EJ Hill and Jibade-Khalil Huffman. The program gives artists a year-long studio space, fellowship grant, stipend for materials, and group exhibition that includes all of the artists-in-residence.

Casteel's second solo exhibition, titled Brothers, opened in October 2015 at Sargent's Daughters. The show contained eight large-scale paintings of dual-portraits and were produced as part of a residency at the Lower Manhattan Cultural Council's “Process Space” on Governor's Island. Curator Johanna Fateman reviewed the work favorably, noting of Casteel's figures that, "she achieves their diorama-like magnetism with subtle perspectival distortions and a synergy of textures."

Casteel's third solo exhibition, Nights in Harlem, opened at Casey Kaplan in September 2017. The show continued her exploration of black male subjectivity but positioned her subjects in "complex interiors and urban environments." The show was met with critical praise; in New York magazine, critic Jerry Saltz wrote, "Casteel seems prepared to take a rightful place on the front lines of contemporary painting," and writer Tausif Noor wrote in Artforum, "Casteel navigates her terrain with ease, lightness, and empathy."

Casteel's first major solo exhibition at a museum was at the Denver Art Museum opened in February 2019. It features approximately thirty paintings spanning over four years from 2014 to 2018, where she portrayed several subjects from her neighborhood in Harlem.

In 2020, Casteel painted a portrait of fashion designer Aurora James for one of the September 2020 covers of Vogue magazine. Jordan Casteel: Within Reach, her first major New York City museum solo show, opened in February 2020 at the New Museum. In 2021, she was awarded a MacArthur Fellowship.

Casteel's work was included in the 2022 exhibition Women Painting Women at the Modern Art Museum of Fort Worth. The painting Lourdes and Katrina (2019) is featured in the permanent collection of Pérez Art Museum Miami.

=== Themes and style ===
Casteel's practice explores humanity, sexuality, identity, and subjectivity. She has almost exclusively painted black subjects, often in varying skin tones based on the light surrounding the sitter from the photographs she takes of her sitters. Subjects have been painted in varying shades of browns, greys, lime greens, navy blues, and light oranges.

Casteel's painterly approach and bold use of color have been compared to painters Jacob Lawrence, Nancy Spero, and Henri Matisse. The palettes Casteel develops in her work are both based on an obsessive relationship with color and vibrancy founded in her childhood, and a determination to push the boundaries of interpretation. She experiments with the effects her colors have on the environments she paints and their relation to her subjects. Throughout her collection of work, the viewer can observe a wealth of colors representing the skin tones of her subjects alone. Casteel's posing and gaze of the subjects in her paintings are just as integral as her relationship with color as she attempts to push the dialogue of blackness. Casteel's figurative works have also been compared to New York artist Alice Neel.

Casteel's work comes from photographs she takes of her subjects. She aims to nudge the viewer's thoughts considering what meaning lies behind being a black man in the U.S. today. In an interview with studio international, Jordan stated, "The intent of the paintings is to expose my vision of black men as a sister, daughter, friend and lover. That perspective is one full of empathy and love. I see their humanity and, in turn, I want the audience to engage with them as fathers, sons, brothers, cousins – as individuals with their own unique stories to share."

=== Teaching ===
Casteel is an Assistant Professor of Painting in the Department of Arts, Culture, and Media at Rutgers University - Newark.

== Personal life ==
Casteel lives in Harlem with her husband David Schulze, an Australian-born photographer she met on the dating app Raya. She has lupus and noted that the condition was especially difficult during her graduate studies.

== Exhibitions ==
Casteel has staged solo shows, exhibitions, and public art installations at galleries and museums in the United States. Her notable solo shows include Visible Man (2014), Sargent's Daughters Gallery, New York; Jordan Casteel: Harlem Notes (2017), Harvey B. Gantt Center, Charlotte, North Carolina; Jordan Casteel: Returning the Gaze (2019–2020), originating at the Denver Art Museum; The Baayfalls (2019–2022), High Line, New York; Jordan Casteel: Within Reach (2020), New Museum, New York; and Jordan Casteel A Presentation of Works (2025), Thaddaeus Ropac, London.

== Notable works in public collections ==
- The Baayfalls (2017), Museum of Modern Art, New York
- Kevin the Kiteman (2017), Studio Museum in Harlem, New York
- Memorial (2017), Museum of Contemporary Art, Los Angeles
- Flight (2018), Cantor Arts Center, Stanford, California
- Ourlando (2018), Crystal Bridges Museum of American Art, Bentonville, Arkansas
- Shirley (Spa Boutique2go) (2018), Rollins Museum of Art, Winter Park, Florida
- Sylvia's (Taniedra, Kendra, Bedelia, Crizette, De'Sean) (2018), Denver Art Museum
- Lourdes and Katrina (2019), Pérez Art Museum Miami
- Barack (2020), Art Institute of Chicago
- Chano Pozo (2021), Whitney Museum, New York
- Yvonne and James II (2021), Metropolitan Museum of Art, New York
