= David Thorpe (artist) =

English painter

David Thorpe (born 1972, London, UK) is an artist based in London.

Thorpe received his BA degree in 1994 from Humberside University and his MA degree in 1998 from Goldsmiths, University of London.

He has shown work in various exhibitions including Die Young Stay Pretty at the ICA, London, at Schirn Kunsthalle in Frankfurt, Monica de Cardenas in Milan and Murray Guy in New York City. Thorpe participated in British Art Show 6 at various venues. He exhibited at the Chisenhale Gallery with Unit.

He has exhibited at Tate Britain and Camden Art Centre.

== Books ==
- David Thorpe: A Rendezvous with My Friends of Liberty, by David Thorpe (2004, Revolver)
