= Matthew Ronay =

American artist (born 1976)

- Born: 1976 (age 49–50); Louisville, Kentucky, U.S.
- Education: Maryland Institute College of Art; Yale University (MFA)
- Occupation: Artist

Matthew Ronay (born 1976) is an American artist who lives and works in New York. Born in 1976 in Louisville, Kentucky, Ronay studied at the Maryland Institute College of Art, before earning his Master of Fine Arts from Yale University in 2000.

== Career ==
Ronay has exhibited at institutions including Kunstverein Lingen, Germany; University of Louisville, Kentucky; Artspace, San Antonio; Serpentine Gallery, London; Sculpture Center, New York; Center for Curatorial Studies, Bard College, New York; Crystal Bridges Museum of American Art, Bentonville, Arkansas; Kentucky Museum of Art and Craft, Louisville, and Parasol Unit Foundation for Contemporary Art, London. Ronay participated in the 2013 Lyon Biennale, curated by Gunnar Kvaran, and the 2004 Whitney Biennial. In 2017 his work was the subject of solo-presentations at the Blaffer Art Museum, Houston, Texas and the Pérez Art Museum Miami, Florida.

Ronay creates organic sculptures, which are carved by hand from sections of basswood. The sculptures originate from drawings, typically rendered in charcoal, gouache or graphite, and then sculpted into three-dimensional form. Ronay's sculptures become densely textured objects that are dyed in a variety of vibrant colors. His references are broad, adopting methods of conceptualism and minimalism along with interests in folk tradition, psychedelia, mythology and non-Western techniques.

== Public collections ==
- ARoS Aarhus Kunstmuseum, Aarhus, Denmark
- Astrup Fearnley Muset for Moderne Kunste, Oslo, Norway
- Crystal Bridges Museum of American Art, Bentonville, AR
- Dallas Museum of Art, TX
- Henry Art Gallery, University of Washington, Seattle, WA
- Los Angeles County Museum of Art, Los Angeles, CA
- Museum of Modern Art, New York, NY
- Perez Art Museum, Miami, FL
- The Whitney Museum of American Art, New York, NY
- Williams College Museum of Art, Williamstown, MA
