= Whitney Young =

American civil rights leader (1921–1971)

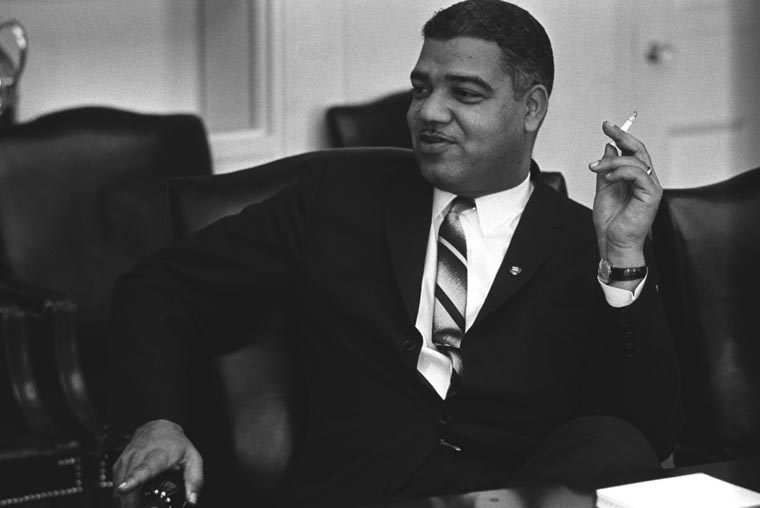
- Young in 1964

Executive Director of the National Urban League
- In office 1961–1971
- Preceded by: Lester Granger
- Succeeded by: Vernon Jordan

Personal details
- Born: Whitney Moore Young Jr. July 31, 1921 Shelby County, Kentucky, U.S.
- Died: March 11, 1971 (aged 49) Lagos, Nigeria
- Spouse: Margaret Buckner (m. 1944)
- Children: 2
- Parent: Whitney M. Young Sr. (father)
- Education: Kentucky State University (BS); Massachusetts Institute of Technology; University of Minnesota, Twin Cities (MSW)
- Awards: Presidential Medal of Freedom

Military service
- Allegiance: United States
- Branch/service: United States Army
- Years of service: 1941–1946
- Rank: First Sergeant
- Battles/wars: World War II

Whitney Moore Young Jr. (July 31, 1921 – March 11, 1971) was an American civil rights leader. Trained as a social worker, he spent most of his career working to end employment discrimination in the United States and turning the National Urban League from a relatively passive civil rights organization into one that aggressively worked for equitable access to socioeconomic opportunity for the historically disenfranchised. Young was influential in the United States federal government's War on Poverty in the 1960s.

== Early life and career ==
Young was born in Shelby County, Kentucky, on July 31, 1921. His father, Whitney M. Young Sr., was the president of the Lincoln Institute, and served twice as the president of the Kentucky Negro Educational Association. Whitney's mother, Laura (Ray) Young, was a teacher who served as the first female postmistress in Kentucky (second in the United States), being appointed to that position by President Franklin D. Roosevelt in 1940. Young enrolled in the Lincoln Institute at the age of 13, graduating as his class valedictorian, with his sister Margaret becoming salutatorian, in 1937.

Young earned his Bachelor of Science in social work from Kentucky State University, a historically black institution. Young had aspirations of becoming a medical doctor at Kentucky State. During his time at Kentucky State, Young was also a forward on the university's basketball team, and was a member of Alpha Phi Alpha fraternity, where he served as the vice president. He became the president of his senior class, and graduated in 1941.

During World War II, Young was trained in electrical engineering at the Massachusetts Institute of Technology (MIT). He was then assigned to a road construction crew of black soldiers supervised by Southern white officers. After just three weeks, he was promoted from private to first sergeant, creating hostility on both sides. Despite the tension, Young was able to mediate effectively between his white officers and black soldiers angry at their poor treatment. This situation propelled Young into a career in race relations.

After the war, Young joined his wife, Margaret, at the University of Minnesota, where he earned a master's degree in social work in 1947 and volunteered for the St. Paul branch of the National Urban League. He was then appointed as the industrial relations secretary in that branch in 1949.

In 1950, Young became president of the National Urban League's Omaha, Nebraska chapter. In that position, he helped get Black workers into jobs previously reserved for white people. Under his leadership, the chapter tripled its number of paying members. While he was president of the Omaha Urban League, Young taught at the University of Nebraska from 1950 to 1954, and Creighton University from 1951 to 1952.

In 1954, he took up his next position, as the first dean of social work at Atlanta University. There, Young supported alumni in their boycott of the Georgia Conference of Social Welfare in response to low rates of African-American employment within the organization. In December 1954, Young and his wife Margaret were the first Black people to join the United Liberal Church (since 1965, named the Unitarian Universalist Congregation of Atlanta), and Whitney would eventually join its board of trustees. Due in part to the Youngs' influence, the church stopped having its annual picnics at segregated parks and became "integrated, not just desegregated." Many in the congregation were active in the civil rights movement, and the Reverend Martin Luther King Jr., then assistant to his father at nearby Ebenezer Baptist Church, was a pulpit guest.

In 1957, he co-authored Some Pioneers in Social Work: brief sketches; student work book with Florence V. Adams.

In 1960, Young was awarded a Rockefeller Foundation grant for a postgraduate year at Harvard University. In the same year, he joined the NAACP and rose to become president of the Georgia branch, where he was also a close friend of Roy Wilkins, the NAACP's executive director.

== Executive Director of National Urban League ==
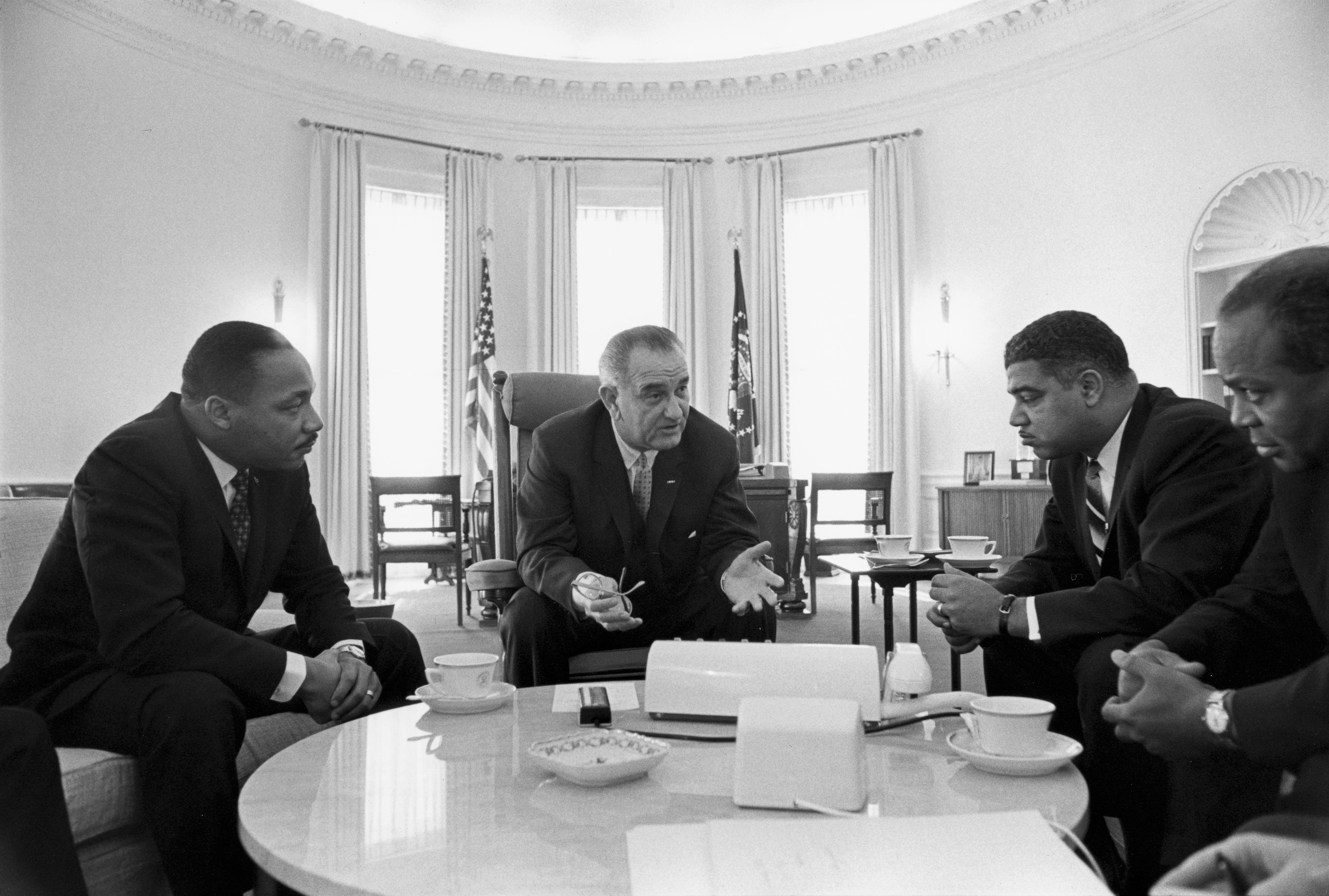
Martin Luther King Jr., Lyndon Johnson and Whitney Young at the White House (1964)

In 1961, at age 40, Young became executive director of the National Urban League. He was unanimously selected by the National Urban League's Board of Directors, succeeding Lester Granger on October 1, 1961. Within four years he expanded the organization from 38 employees to 1,600 employees; and from an annual budget of $325,000 to one of $6,100,000. Young served as President of the Urban League until his death in 1971.

The Urban League had traditionally been a cautious and moderate organization with many white members. During Young's ten-year tenure at the League, he brought the organization to the forefront of the American Civil Rights Movement. He both greatly expanded its mission and kept the support of influential white business and political leaders. In a 1964 interview with Robert Penn Warren for the book Who Speaks for the Negro? and archived at the Louie B. Nunn Center for Oral History, Young expressed the mission of the Urban League not as ground-level activism in itself but as the supplement and complement of the activities of all other organizations; he states, "we are the social engineers, we are the strategists, we are the planners, we are the people who work at the level of policy-making, policy implementation, the highest echelons of the corporate community, the highest echelons of the governmental community – both at the federal, state and local level – the highest echelons of the labor movement." As part of the League's new mission, Young initiated programs like "Street Academy", an alternative education system to prepare high school dropouts for college, and "New Thrust", an effort to help local black leaders identify and solve community problems. He also pushed for initiatives like scholarships to recruit black people into the architecture profession, which has been and continues to be predominantly white.

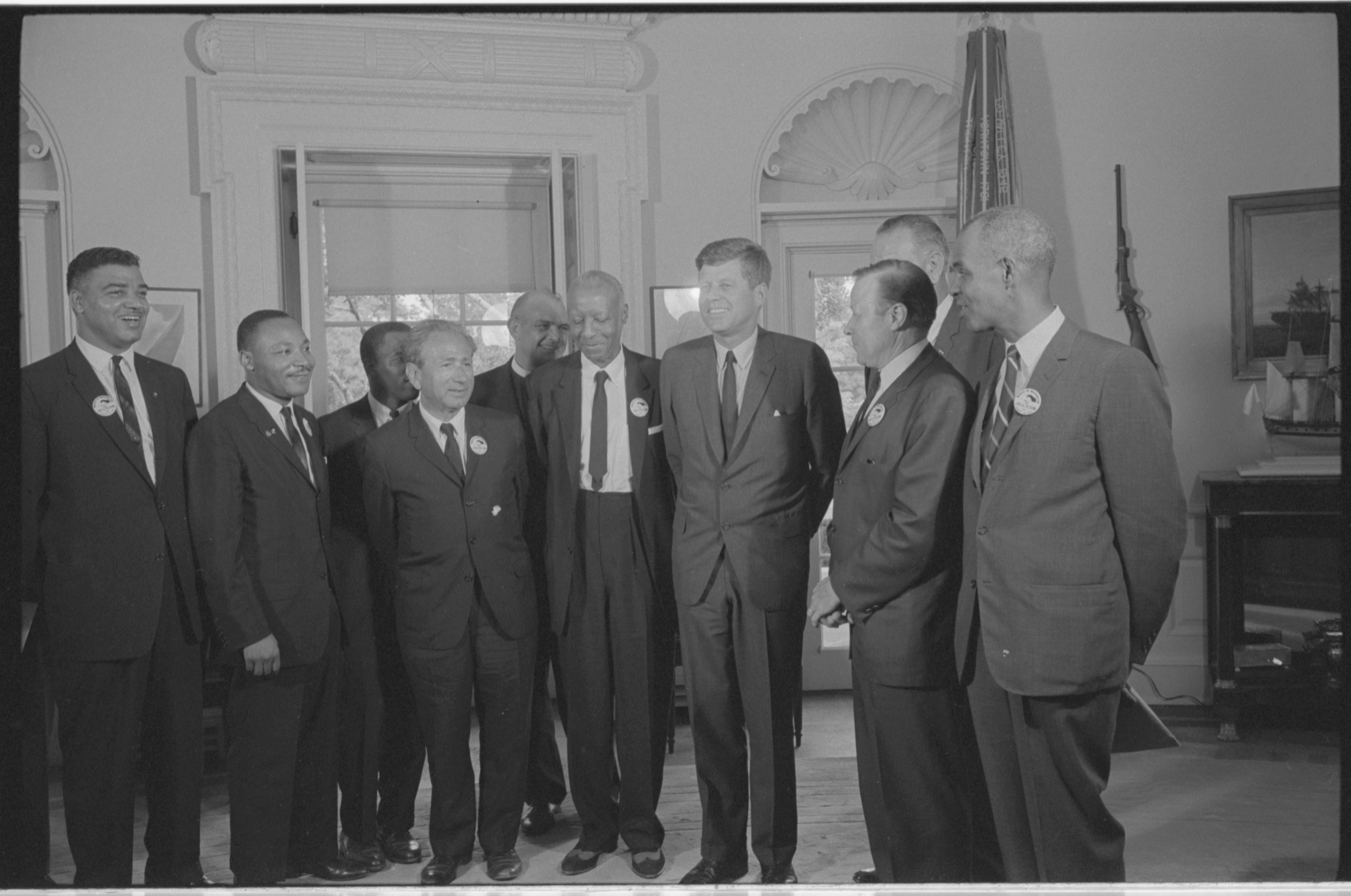
Civil rights leaders meet with President John F. Kennedy

Young also pushed for federal aid to cities, proposing a domestic "Marshall Plan". This plan, which called for $145 billion in spending over 10 years, was partially incorporated into President Lyndon B. Johnson's War on Poverty. Young described his proposals for integration, social programs, and affirmative action in his two books, To Be Equal (1964) and Beyond Racism (1969).

As executive director of the League, Young pushed major corporations to hire more Black people. In doing so, he fostered close relationships with CEOs such as Henry Ford II, leading some Black people to charge that Young had sold out to the white establishment. Young denied these charges and stressed the importance of working within the system to effect change. Still, Young was not afraid to take a bold stand in favor of civil rights. For instance, in 1963, Young was one of the organizers of the March on Washington despite the opposition of many white business leaders.

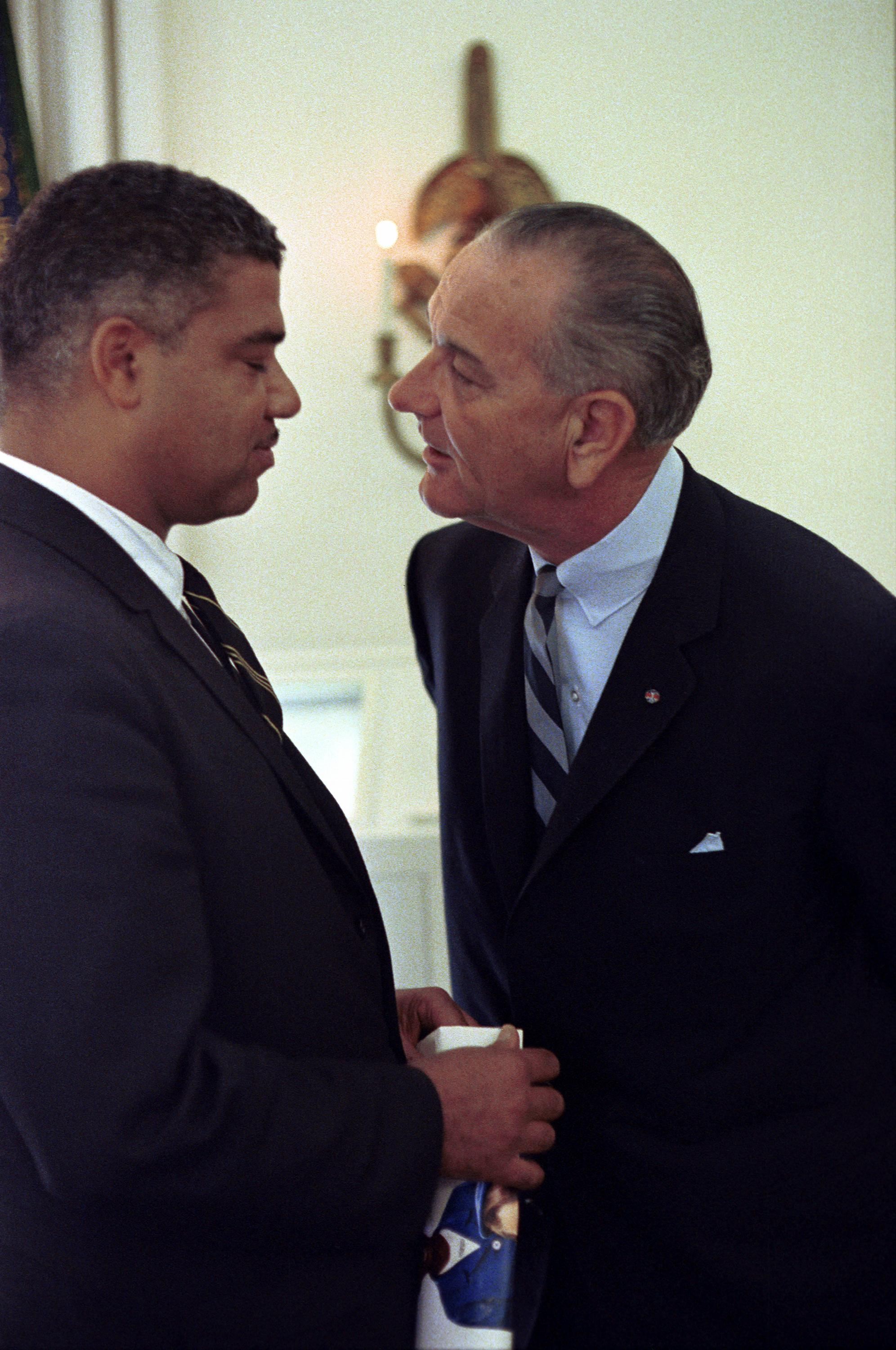
Young receives "The Treatment" from President Johnson (1966)

Despite his reluctance to enter politics himself, Young was an important advisor to Presidents Kennedy, Johnson, and Nixon. In 1968, faced with the possibility of Robert C. Weaver resigning his position as Secretary of Housing and Urban Development, Johnson considered Young as a potential replacement. After the 1968 election, representatives of President-elect Richard Nixon tried to interest Young in a Cabinet post, but Young refused, believing that he could accomplish more through the Urban League.

Young had a particularly close relationship with President Johnson, and in 1969, Johnson honored Young with the highest civilian award, the Presidential Medal of Freedom. Young, in turn, was impressed by Johnson's commitment to civil rights.

Despite their close personal relationship, Young was frustrated by Johnson's attempts to use him to balance Martin Luther King's opposition to the increasingly unpopular Vietnam War. Young publicly supported Johnson's war policy, but came to oppose the war after the end of Johnson's presidency.

In 1968 Herman Ferguson and Arthur Harris were convicted of conspiring to murder Young. The trial took place in the New York State Supreme Court, with Justice Paul Balsam presiding.

== Contribution to the American Institute of Architects ==
In 1968, Young was invited to address the American Institute of Architects National Convention in Portland, Oregon through the keynote speech. At the time, Young was the executive director of the National Urban League and had spoken before on the concerns of the AIA regarding social and racial inequality in housing and cities. In his speech, he addressed the institute's silent stance on the turmoil in the country and urged them to stand up and endorse the efforts of John F. Kennedy and Martin Luther King Jr. in their actions. In response to Young's words, the Institute created two separate resolutions to advance the organizations initiative for diversity and social equality: one created a scholarship program, the AIA/Architects Foundation Diversity Advancement Scholarship, specifically for minorities who wanted to study architecture and another called architects to be actively engaged in the current social issues. To address the lack of diversity in the profession, the AIA revised their Code of Ethics and Professional Conduct to ban discrimination based on sex, race or religion and was expanded in subsequent years to include place of origin, disabled status and sexual orientation or gender identity. The institute also created a Whitney M. Young Jr. Award for those that embodies the social principles of equity and justice that Young fought for. "Community design" emerged as an initiative for architects to engage with people in urban projects, instead of working exclusively alone. Young's speech served as a driver for those that were previously frustrated with architecture and urban design. The AIA then started the Regional/Urban Design Assistance Team Program and Center for Communities by Design as programs that work for community development and include community members in the design process.

== Leadership at the National Association of Social Workers (NASW) ==
Young served as president of the National Association of Social Workers (NASW), from 1969 to 1971. He took office at a time of fiscal instability in the association and uncertainty about President Nixon's continuing commitment to the War on Poverty and to ending the war in Vietnam. At the 1969 NASW Delegate Assembly Young stated,

First of all, I think the country is in deep trouble. We, as a country have blazed unimagined trails technologically and industrially. We have not yet begun to pioneer in those things that are human and social… I think that social work is uniquely equipped to play a major role in this social and human renaissance of our society, which will, if successful, lead to its survival, and if it is unsuccessful, will lead to its justifiable death.

—NASW News, May 1969

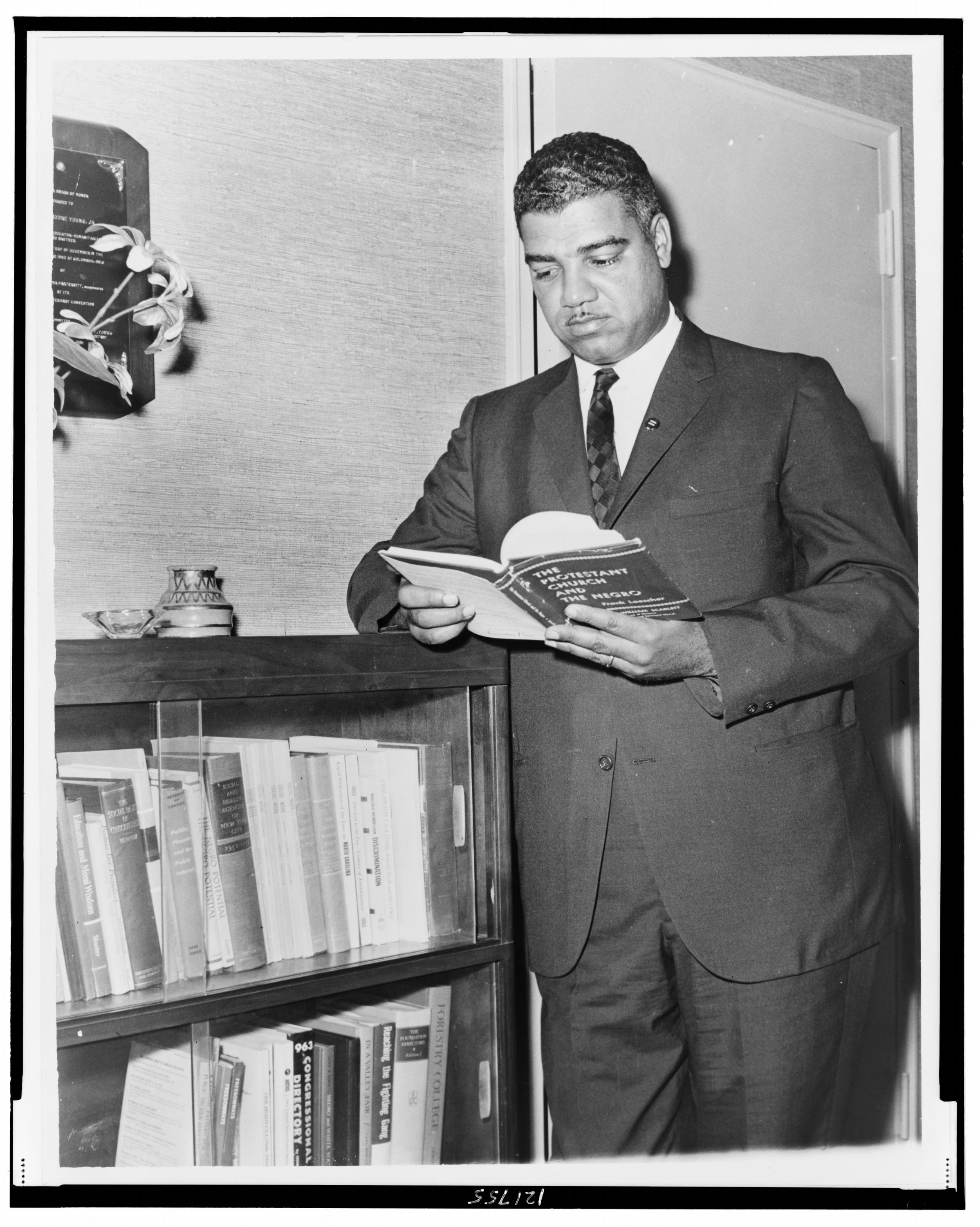
Whitney Young

Young spent his tenure as President of NASW ensuring that the profession kept pace with the troubling social and human challenges it was facing. NASW News articles document his call to action for social workers to address social welfare through poverty reduction, race reconciliation, and putting an end to the War in Vietnam. In the NASW News, July 1970, he challenged his professional social work organization to take leadership in the national struggle for social welfare:

The crisis in health and welfare services in our nation today highlights for NASW what many of us have been stressing for a long time: inherent in the responsibility for leadership in social welfare is responsibility for professional action. They are not disparate aspects of social work but merely two faces of the same coin to be spent on more and better services for the people who need our help. It is out of our belief in this broad definition of responsibility for social welfare that NASW is taking leadership in the efforts to reorder our nation's priorities and future direction, and is calling on social workers everywhere to do the same.

The NASW News, May 1971, tribute to Young noted that "As usual Whitney Young was preparing to do battle on the major issues and programs facing the association and the nation. And he was doing it with his usual aplomb-dapper, self-assured, ready to deal with the "power" people to bring about change for the powerless."

Young was also the Dean of the school of Social Work at Clark Atlanta University, which now bears his name. In his last column as President for NASW, Young wrote, "whatever we do we should tell the public what we are doing and why. They have to hear from social workers as much as they hear from reporters and government officials."

== Death ==
On March 11, 1971, Young drowned while swimming with friends in Lagos, Nigeria, where he was attending a conference sponsored by the African-American Institute. President Nixon sent a plane to Nigeria to collect Young's body and traveled to Kentucky to deliver the eulogy at Young's funeral.

== Marriage and family ==
In 1944, he married Margaret Buckner Young. They had two daughters and moved to New Rochelle in 1961.

Marcia Young Cantarella, PhD has been a dean or senior administrator at several colleges including NYU, Princeton and Hunter Colleges, serves on several boards and is the author of I CAN Finish College: The Overcome Any Obstacle and Get Your Degree Guide. His daughter Lauren Young Casteel became the first black woman to head a foundation in Colorado. There are also several grandchildren and great-grandchildren, including businessman Mark Boles who served on the Urban League board and artist Jordan Casteel.

Young's sister, Arnita Young, was married to Chicago politician and physician Paul P. Boswell.

== Legacy ==
In his eulogy, Nixon stated that Young's legacy was that "he knew how to accomplish what other people were merely for". Young's work was considered instrumental in breaking down the barriers of segregation and inequality that held back African Americans.

=== Namesakes ===
Many sites across the country are named after Young or have memorials dedicated to him. For instance, in 1973, the East Capitol Street Bridge in Washington, D.C., was renamed the Whitney Young Memorial Bridge in his honor. Young's birthplace (Whitney Young Birthplace and Museum) in Shelby County, Kentucky is a designated National Historic Landmark, with a museum dedicated to Young's life and achievements.

Young was honored in 1981 by the United States Postal Service on a postage stamp issued as part of its ongoing Black Heritage series.

The Whitney Young School of Honors and Liberal Studies at Kentucky State University was named after him. Also, Clark Atlanta University named its School of Social Work, where Whitney Young served as Dean, in Young's honor. The Whitney M. Young School of Social Work is well known for founding the "Afro-Centric" perspective of social work.

The Boy Scouts of America created the Whitney M. Young Jr. Service Award to recognize outstanding services by an adult individual or an organization for demonstrated involvement in the development and implementation of Scouting opportunities for youth from rural or low-income urban backgrounds. In 1973, The African American MBA Association at The Wharton School, University of Pennsylvania held its first Annual Whitney M. Young Jr. Memorial Conference. After 38 years, the Whitney M. Young Jr. Memorial Conference is the longest student-run conference held at The Wharton School.

The America center in Lagos, Nigeria located within the U.S. Consulate which was formerly the Information resource center in Lagos has also been named after him.

Schools named after Young include Whitney M. Young Magnet High School in Chicago, Whitney M. Young Gifted & Talented Leadership Academy in Cleveland, Ohio, Whitney Young Early Childhood Center in Fort Wayne, Indiana, Whitney Young School in Louisville, Kentucky, Whitney M. Young Elementary in Dallas, Texas, and The Whitney M. Young Jr. Community school in Jersey City, New Jersey.

The Whitney M. Young Health Center in Albany, New York was also named after him.

The American Institute of Architects honors annually a recipient of the Whitney Young Jr award. In 2019 this award was received by Karen Braitmayer for her contributions to universal design

== In movies ==
The documentary, The Powerbroker: Whitney Young's Fight for Civil Rights, directed by Christine Khalafian and Taylor Hamilton, chronicles Young's rise from segregated Kentucky to the national movement for civil rights. The film includes archival footage, photos, and interviews compiled by Young's niece, award-winning journalist Bonnie Boswell Hamilton. Interviews include Henry Louis Gates Jr., Ossie Davis, Julian Bond, Roy Innis, Vernon Jordan, Dorothy Height, and Donald Rumsfeld.

== See also ==
- Civil rights movement in Omaha, Nebraska
- Big Six (activists)
- List of civil rights leaders
