= Centre d'Art Contemporain Genève =

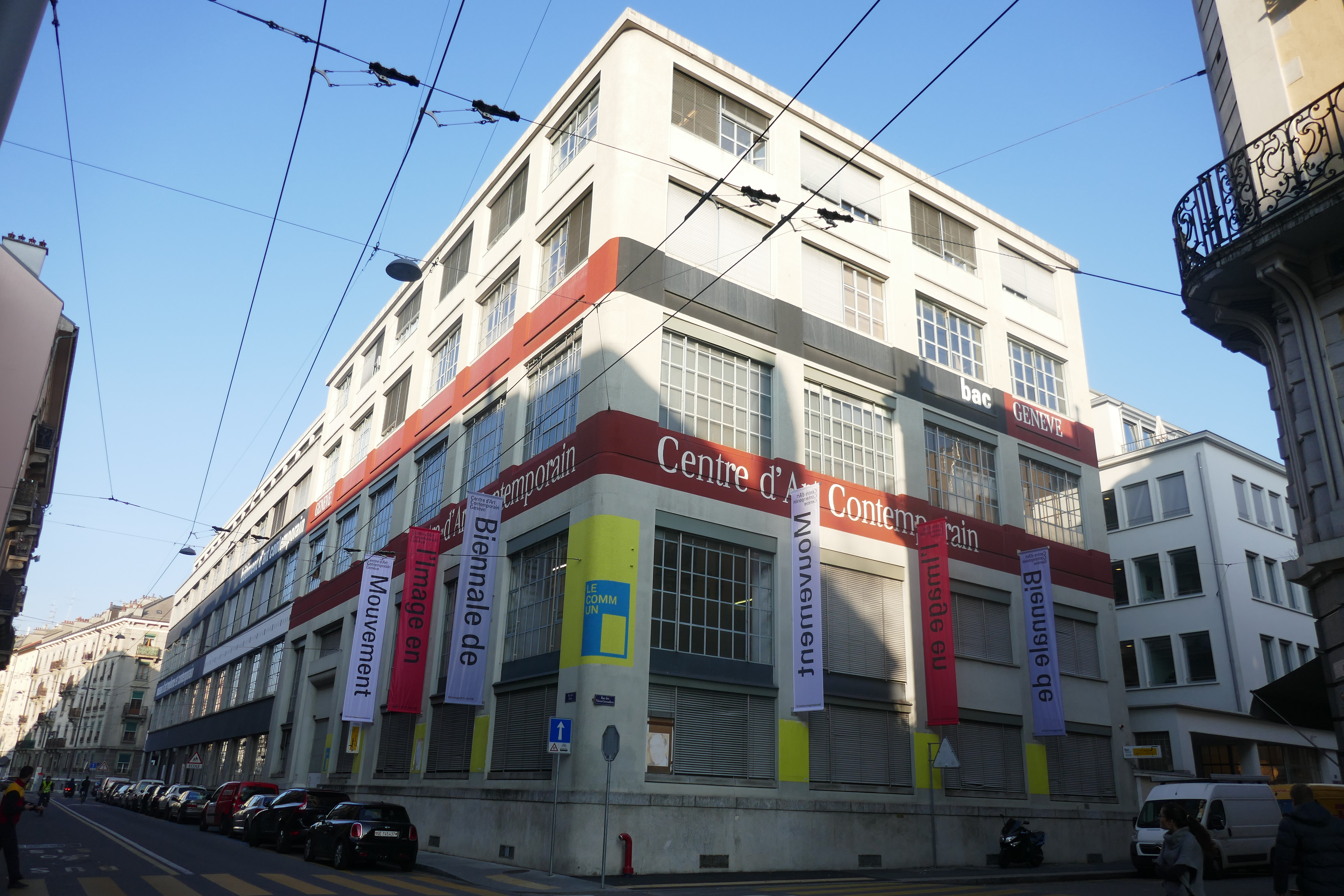
- Bâtiment du Centre d'Art Contemporain Genève à la Rue des Vieux-Grenadiers 10, Genève
- Established: 1974
- Coordinates: 46.198733°N 6.137668°E
- Type: Kunsthalle
- Director: Andrea Bellini
- Website: www.centre.ch

The Centre d'Art Contemporain Genève (Centre) is a contemporary art exhibition centre (a Kunsthalle) in Geneva, Switzerland, founded by Adelina von Fürstenberg in 1974.

The centre was the first contemporary art institution in Suisse Romande (i.e. in French speaking Switzerland). As a Kunsthalle, it does not have a collection, but organizes temporary exhibitions and projects with regional and international artists.

The Centre d'Art Contemporain Genève gained international renown with exhibitions by artists such as Joseph Beuys, Martin Boyce, Olaf Breuning, Maurizio Cattelan, Roberto Cuoghi, Gilbert & George, Nan Goldin, Dan Graham, Joan Jonas, On Kawara, William Kentridge, Robert Overby, Pipilotti Rist, Ugo Rondinone, Sterling Ruby, Thomas Scheibitz, Shirana Shahbazi, Cindy Sherman, Josh Smith, Andy Warhol, Lawrence Weiner, Christopher Wool.

In 2010, the Centre took on the mission of the Centre pour l’Image Contemporaine (CIC), established in Geneva in 1985. CIC was established to organize events and exhibitions of images using new technologies such as video, multimedia, and the Internet, as well as more traditional photography and film (Biennale de l'Image en Mouvement).

== Directors ==
- 1974 – 1990 Adelina von Fürstenberg
- 1990 – 2001 Paolo Colombo
- 2002 – 2011 Katya García-Antón
- 2012 – present Andrea Bellini

== Publications ==
- 2022 – "BIM’21. A Goodbye Letter", A Love Call, A Wake-Up Song, LENZ
- 2022 – "From Concrete to Liquid to Spoken Worlds to the Word", LENZ
- 2022 – "The Continuum Was Performed in the Following Manner – Notes on documenta 14", NERO. Textes
- 2021 – "Psicoenciclopedia possibile, Gianfranco Baruchello", ed Andrea Bellini, Motto Books. Texts by Andrea Bellini, Carla Subrizi and Ambroise Tièche
- 2021 – "Lemaniana", ed Andrea Bellini, Motto Books. Texts by Mohamed Almusibli, Andrea Bellini, Roxane Bovet, Patrick de Rham, Jill Gasparina et Stéphanie Moisdon.
- 2021 – "Poems I Will Never Release: Chiara Fumai 2007-2017", ed Andrea Bellini, Milovan Farronato, Francesco Urbano Ragazzi, NERO Editions. Texts by Irene Aristizábal, Andrea Bellini, Federico Campagna, Milovan Farronato, Gabriel Lester, Raimundas Malašauskas, Chus Martínez, Mara Montanaro, Paulina Olowska, Cristiana Perrellal, Marcello Bellan, Francesco Urbano Ragazzi, Giovanna Zapperi, Sara De Chiara.
- 2020 – "Srievere Disegnato", ed Andrea Bellini, Sarah Lombardi, Skira. Texts by Andrea Bellini, Sarah Lombardi, Deerek Beaulieu, Federico Campagna, Vincent Capt, François Chastanet, Andrea Cortellessa, Morad Montazami, Joana Neves, Marta Spagnolello, Michel Thévoz, Marina Yaguello
- 2020 – "Sabrina Röthlisberger, LE SANG", ed Sabrina Röthlisberger, Centre d'Art Contemporain Genève, Mousse Publishing.
- 2019 – "Biennale de l’Image en Mouvement 2018", ed Andrea Bellini, Andrea Lissoni, Corraini Edizioni. Texts by Andrea Bellini, Andrea Lissoni, Edwin Nasr, boychild, Rahel Aima, Aaron Weldon, Helen Molesworth, Daniel Berndt, Ian Cheng, Majid Al-Remaihi, Abdullah Al-Mutairi, Giona A. Nazzaro, Pujan Karambeigi, Sarah Wang, Émile Ouroumov, Tirdad Zolghadr, Thomas Zummer, Leslie Thornton.
- 2019 – "Hreinn Friðfinnsson, Works 1964–2019", ed Andrea Bellini, Krist Gruijthuijsen, Koenig books. Texts by Ivana Bago, Luca Cerizza, Cassandra Edlefsen Lasch, Sara De Chiara
- 2018 – "Cally Spooner, And you were wonderful, on stage", ed. Cally Spooner, Meret Kaufman, Mousse Publishing.
- 2017 – "Qiu Zhijie, Journeys without arrivals", ed. Andrea Bellini, Mousse Publishing. Texts by Andrea Bellini, Davide Quadrio, Francesca Girelli
- 2017 – "Reto Pulfer, Zustandskatalog", ed. Reto Pulfer, Nikola Dietrich, Sternberg Press.Texts by Anselm Franke, Benoît Maire, Retro Pulfer
- 2017 – "Roberto Cuoghi, Perla Pollina", ed. Andrea Bellini, Hatje Cantz. Texts by Andrea Bellini, Andrea Cortellessa, Roberto Cuoghi, Anthony Huberman, Charlotte Laubard, Yorgos Tzirtzilakis, Andrea Viliani.
- 2017 – "Centre d'art contemporain Genève 1974-2017", ed. Andrea Bellini, Centre d'art contemporain Genève. Texts by Jean Altounian, John M Armleder, Andrea Bellini, François Bovier, Paolo Colombo, Silvie Defraoui, Kenneth Goldsmith, Adeena Mey, Xavier Oberson, Adelina von Fürstenberg, Katya Garcia-Antón, Olivier Mosset.
- 2017 – "Steven Claydon", ed. Andrea Bellini, Mousse Publishing. Texts by Mark Beasley, Michael Bracewell, Martin Clark, Michelle Cotton.
- 2017 – "Biennale de l'Image en Mouvement 2016", ed. Andrea Bellini, Mousse Publishing
- 2016 – "Biennale de l'Image en Mouvement 2014", ed. Andrea Bellini, Mousse Publishing.
- 2015 – "Ernie Gehr, Bon voyage", ed. Andrea Bellini, Mousse Publishing. Texts by Andrea Bellini, Ken Eisenstein, John G. Hanhardt.
- 2015 – "Giorgio Griffa, Works 1965-2015", ed. Andrea Bellini, Mousse Publishing
- 2015 –"Miroslav Marsalek", ed. Andrea Bellini, Centre d'Art Contemporain Genève
- 2015 – "Maya Rochat: A Plastic Tool", ed. Delphine Bedel, Metabooks
- 2015 – "Alfredo Aceto", ed. Andrea Bellini, JRP | Ringier / Hapax Series
- 2014 – "Raphael Hefti", ed. Renata Catambas, JRP | Ringier / Hapax Series
- 2014 – "Joachim Koester: Of Spirits and Empty Spaces", ed Thomas Caron. Texts by Thomas Caron, Philippe-Alain Michaud, Christopher Pinney, Clara Schulmann, Catherine Wood, Joachim Koester.
- 2013 – "Pablo Bronstein: A is Building, B is Architecture", ed par Andrea Bellini, Pablo Bronstein. Texts by Sam Jacob, Catherine Wood, Andrea Bellini.
- 2013 – "Gianni Piacentino", ed Andrea Bellini. Texts by Andrea Bellini, Dan Cameron, Laura Cherubini, Christophe Khim, Hans Ulrich Obrist, Marc-Olivier Wahler.
- 2013 – "Piccolo Manuale dell'Espressione con la Gommapiuma", ed Andrea Bellini. Texts by Andrea Bellini, Piero Gilardi.
- 2012 – "Pamela Rosenkranz", ed Katya García-Antón, Gianni Jetzer, Quinn, Latimer, Pamela Rosenkranz, Hike Wagner. Texts by Alex Kitnick, Robin Mackay, Reza Negarestani.
- 2008 – "Mai-Thu Perret: Land of Cristal", ed Christoph Keller. Texts by Giovanni Carmine, Fabrice Stroun, Paula van den Bosch, Hamza Walker.
- 2007 –" Philippe Decrauzat", ed Lionel Bovier. Texts by Bice Curiger, Julien Fronsacq, Katya García-Antón, Bob Nickas.
- 2007 – "Joan Jonas. Timelines: transparencies in a dark room", ed Barbara Clausen, Katya García-Antón, Bartomeu Marí et Gregory Volk.

== See also ==
- List of museums in Switzerland
- Plainpalais
