= DAAD Alumni Association of the US =

Nonprofit organization

DAAD Alumni Association USA
- Formation: May 17, 1996; 30 years ago
- Type: NGO
- Legal status: foundation
- Headquarters: 871 United Nations Plaza New York City, NY 10017
- Members: ~1,000
- Staff: 1
- Volunteers: 15
- Website: www.daad-alumni-usa.org

The DAAD Alumni Association USA (also short DAAD Alumni USA) is a private, nonprofit organization whose members are German Academic Exchange Service (DAAD) alumni and friends of international education. The association supports and promotes international educational and cultural exchange and the ideal most associated with mutual understanding among the peoples of the world. The DAAD Alumni Association USA also conducts receptions in local communities in the U.S., and helps to host the annual Sound Understanding Concert at Carnegie Hall.

== Brief history ==
The DAAD Alumni Association USA engages current and former DAAD exchange participants in lifelong experiences that advance international understanding through volunteer service to communities, people-to-people diplomacy, and international dialogue.

The DAAD Alumni Association USA is part of a global network of over 160 DAAD alumni associations.

In 2023 the DAAD Alumni Association USA joined the German-American Alumni (GAA) network.

The DAAD is the world's largest funding organisation for the international exchange of students and scholars. Since it was founded in 1925, around 2.8 million scholars in Germany and abroad have received DAAD funding. Its budget is primarily derived from the German Federal Foreign Office, but also from other German ministries, the European Union and a number of enterprises, organisations and foreign governments. In 2021, the DAAD funded more than 134,900 German and international scholars worldwide.

== Programs ==
=== The DAAD Alumni Association's Prize for Excellence in International Exchange ===
The DAAD Alumni Association's Prize for Excellence in International Exchange is awarded to recognize individuals who have made extraordinary contributions toward bringing peoples, cultures, or nations to greater understanding of others. The 2023 recipient of the award is John Torpey, Presidential Professor of Sociology and History at the CUNY Graduate Center, Director of its Ralph Bunche Institute. and Director of its European Union Studies Center

=== RISE Fellowships ===
The DAAD Alumni Association USA collects donations in order to fund a number of RISE Fellowships for study in Germany.

== Current Leadership ==
Mechthild Schmidt Feist, Clinical Professor at New York University, School of Professional Studies, is the 2023 President of the DAAD Alumni Association USA.

Manfred Philipp, Professor emeritus of Chemistry at Lehman College and Professor emeritus of Biochemistry and Chemistry at the CUNY Graduate Center and 2018 President of the Fulbright Association, is the current Vice President. He was President of the Association in 2013–4.

Sigrid Berka, Professor of German; executive director, International Engineering Program at the University of Rhode Island, is chair of the Excellence Award Committee.

Erika Berroth, Associate Professor of German at Southwestern University, is co-Secretary.

Ingo Brachmann, Technical Manager for Project Analysis, Oversight, and Review at the National Nuclear Security Administration, is Treasurer.

Tina Frühauf, Adjunct Associate Professor at Columbia University and member of the doctoral faculty of the CUNY Graduate Center, is member of the Fundraising and Program Committees.

Erich Haratsch, 2019-2021 President of the Association, is chair of the Governance Committee.

Helena Kane Finn a visiting scholar at Columbia University's Institute for the Study of Human Rights was the 2022 President of the Association.

Anne MacLachlan, retired Senior Research Associate and Visiting Scholars Coordinator at the University of California, Berkeley Center for Studies in Higher Education, is Chair of the University Liaison Committee.

Christopher Medalis, Director, Office of Research and Sponsored Programs at the School for International Training, is co-Treasurer.

Can M. Olgun, a faculty member at the Borough of Manhattan Community College, is member of the Program Committee.

Ingeborg Rocker a professor at the Georgia Tech School of Architecture, is the most recent Vice President.

Susanne Rott a professor of Germanic Studies at the University of Illinois Chicago, is Chair of the Scholarship Committee.

Uli Wagner, Principal/Owner at Uli Wagner Design Lab, is a member of the Media and Web Committee.

Rick White, a professor at Sam Houston State University is a member of the Scholarship and University Liaison Committees Rebecca Williams is Co-Secretary and Chair of the Fundraising Committee.

Helene Zimmer-Loew is former president and Honorary Member of the Board.

Amra Dumisic is the liaison to DAAD.
