= Emily Wardill =

British artist (born 1977)

Emily Wardill (born 1977, Rugby, England), is a British artist and film maker.

She studied fine art at Central St. Martins College of Arts and Design in London. In 2010, Wardill was awarded the Film London Artists' Moving Image Network Jarman Award, which allowed her to show her works on national television in the UK. Wardill was awarded a Philip Leverhulme Prize in Visual and Performing Arts in 2011.

Wardill has exhibited her works internationally, in Australia, Denmark, Germany, Italy, the Netherlands, Norway, Portugal, and the United States. Wardill's work has been exhibited at Art Basel, the Serpentine Gallery, Tate Britain, and the Venice Biennale. Her films have appeared in the International Film Festival Rotterdam, London Film Festival, International Short Film Festival Oberhausen, and Toronto International Film Festival. She has created both shorts and feature-length films. Her film subjects include ghost stories, mental illness, religion, and contemporary art and visual culture.

In September 2025, she signed an open pledge with Film Workers for Palestine pledging not to work with Israeli film institutions "that are implicated in genocide and apartheid against the Palestinian people."
