= Stephan von Huene =

American artist (1932–2000)

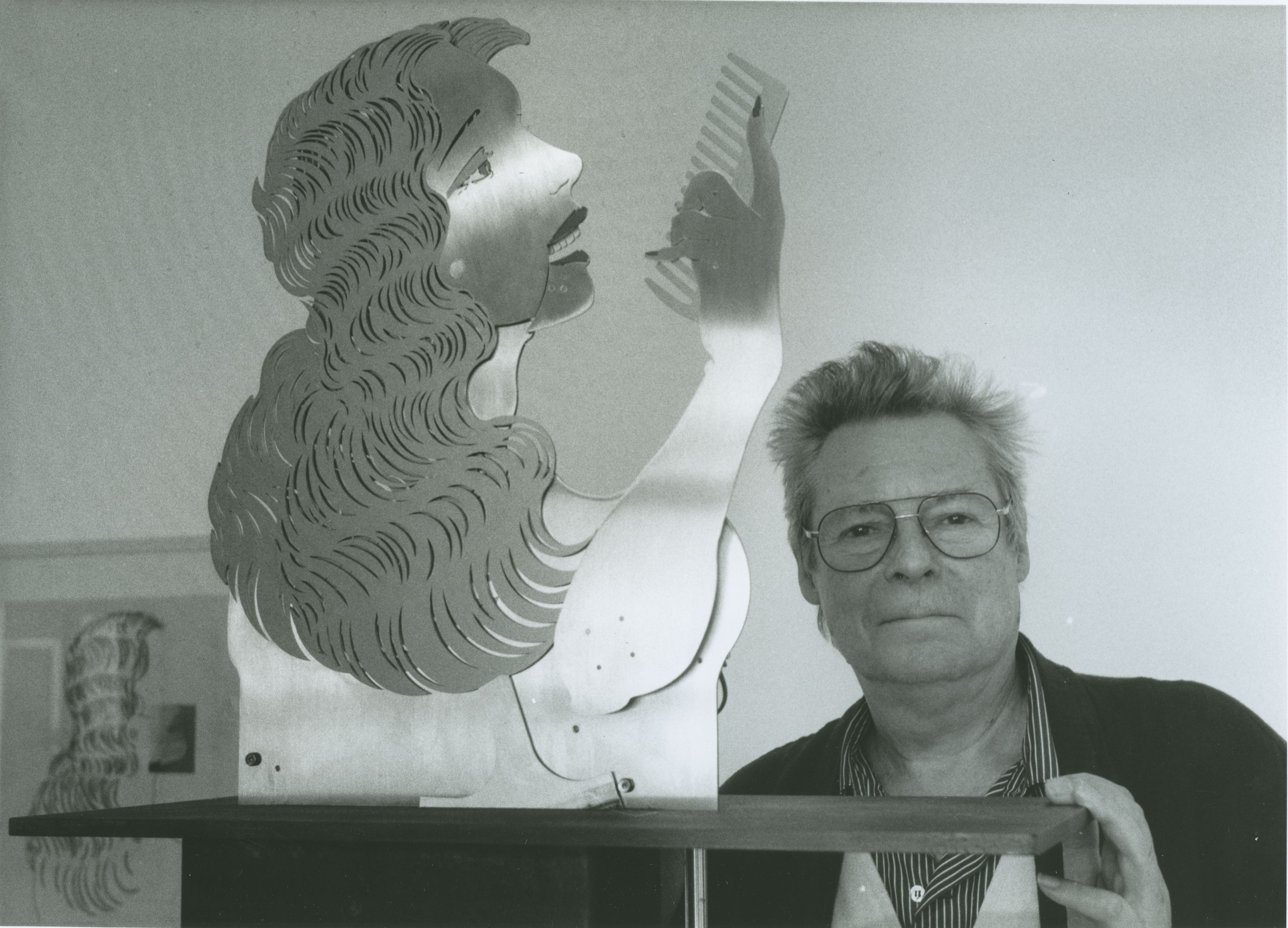
- Stephan von Huene with "The New Lore Ley II", (1997)
- Born: Stephan von Huene; September 15, 1932; Los Angeles, California
- Died: September 5, 2000 (aged 67); Hamburg, Germany
- Education: Chouinard Art Institute; University of California, Los Angeles
- Known for: sound sculptures Kinetic art
- Notable work: Tap Dancer (1967); Text Tones (1979–83); Dancing on Tables (1988); Lexichaos (1990)
- Awards: DAAD artist in residence, Berlin (1976); Media Art Prize of the ZKM, Karlsruhe (1992) guest of Villa Aurora, Pacific Palisades (1997)

Stephan von Huene (September 15, 1932, in Los Angeles – September 5, 2000, in Hamburg) was an American artist with German origins. His kinetic and sound sculptures bring together art and science, amalgamating image, tones and motion synesthetically.

== Life ==
=== Early life ===
Stephan von Huene was born into a family of immigrants from the Baltic States (now Estonia). Both parents were descendants of historical German families: the noble von Hoyningen Huene family and the Andreae family of theologians. They brought up their children according to the protestant faith and european culture and science. This legacy may have been formative for von Huene to search for a contemporary art medium in the spirit of an universalist. The family spoke German, however he learned English outside the family. As a child in Los Angeles, he came into contact with more languages. These experiences had an influence on von Huene's work. "One of the most important concerns that occupied Stephan von Huene throughout his life was communication in all its manifestations"

Stephan von Huene's father worked as an engineer at the California Institute of Technology (CalTech) where he built specialized machinery. Von Huene and his brother spent time within this working environment. The young Stephan von Huene acquired knowledge and approaches that he later applied to his work. For example, he constructed a punching machine to programme the perforated tapes for his first sound sculptures, which he built himself.

=== Artistic career ===
Von Huene studied painting, drawing and design at the Chouinard Art Institute (Bachelor of Arts), as well as fine art and art history at the University of California, Los Angeles where he received a (Master of Arts) degree.

His first abstract-expressionist paintings, which he developed into combines, date from the early 1960s. The Norton Simon Museum owns two of those assemblages.

They were created concurrently with a series of figurative pen, ink and pencil drawings (Pasadena Pen Drawings). Drawing as an artistic medium and tool for developing and manifesting ideas remains an essential component of von Huene's work (i. e. The Getty Talk). Onomatopoetic phenomena appeared already in his early pictures and drawings.

In the first part of 1960s von Huene created Surrealism-inspired sculptures in wood, leather, bread and other materials. These static sculptures were influenced by the aesthetic of domestic objects of utility and everyday material.

Between 1964 and 1970 he built his first kinetic and sound sculptures, based on investigations of the acoustics of musical instruments, mechanical keyboards (player pianos), musical automatons, and organs, and guided via optoelectronic programs (perforated tape). These works were connected to von Huene's theoretical interest in acoustical phenomena. His reading of Hermann von Helmholtz's On the Sensations of Tone (1865) as well as of Dayton C. Miller's The Science of musical Sounds (1916) was formative to this.

For his later works, von Huene developed electronic programs in which his preoccupation with communication theory and its application to artistic activity played a fundamental role. Here Gregory Bateson, Paul Watzlawick and later the cyberneticist and friend Heinz von Foerster served as crucial sources of information. From his earliest days as an artist, von Huene cultivated friendships with Allan Kaprow and Edward Kienholz, and also with the painter Sam Francis. At the Exploratorium in San Francisco, he worked together with the composer James Tenney on Drum (1975).

During the Hamburg period he became acquainted with the composer György Ligeti. With the art historians Horst Bredekamp and Martin Warnke as well as the historian Achatz von Müller he shared a close friendship, which is partly reflected in his artworks, for example in What's wrong with Art, the Blue Books and Entry Questions/Exit Questions.

Von Huene was also a teacher, among his students were Mira Schor, Olav Westphalen and Thomas Zitzwitz. He taught sculpture at the California Institute of the Arts from 1971 until 1980.

Later he taught basic drawing classes in Europe at the International Summer Academy of Fine Arts in Salzburg. In 1977–78, von Huene held a scholarship with the Artists in Berlin program of the German Academic Exchange Service (DAAD). In 1980 he relocated his studio from Los Angeles to Hamburg. He spent 1991 in Santa Monica as a participant in the Getty Research Institute's Scholars in Residence Program. In Karlsruhe, he organized the Low Fidelity Studio in the Department of Media Arts at the University of Art and Design between 1992 and 1997. In 1997, he was a guest at the Villa Aurora in Pacific Palisades, Los Angeles.

During his Hamburg years von Huene was married to Petra Kipphoff, a cultural critic and editor for the weekly newspaper DIE ZEIT. Von Huene's ZEIT-Collages were created in the correspondence between the two. Kipphoff had sent him issues of ZEIT by post, and the artist replied with collages of photos and text fragments from the newspaper, arranged on A4 sheets of paper, supplemented by his own drawings and writing. This work was exhibited at the Hamburger Kunsthalle in 2003 and 2010.

== Kinetic and sound sculptures ==
Kinetic sound sculptures are at the centre of Stephan von Huene's art. In the 1960s, he constructed mechanically operated, sculptural objects reminiscent of pieces of furniture that had been set in motion. According to Allan Kaprow, "There is no nostalgia in his beings who articulate their own existence almost didactically and "in tongues". They seem on their own, stylistically removed from now just enough to perform without either necessity or apology. They are perhaps a little smug of their mystery. What they are not, that is, what is absent, is of no importance to them. It is what makes their magic so potent."

During the 1970s and 1980s, these sculptures acquired the character of automatic musical instruments or automata. With the Text Tones, they were expanded to become interactive sound installations which occupy entire rooms. Added as well during the 1990s were pictorial media, drawings for example in Dancing on Tables, and projections, for example in the Blue Books and Sirens Low. Dancing on Tables (1989) and the Man from Jüterbog (1995) have a special focus on the expression of human movements in interaction with spoken texts. 1999 von Huene built the Semiconductor of Chemnitz, a mute kinetic half figure for the Foyer of the lecture hall of the Chemnitz University of Technology.

=== 1964–1969 ===
The early sculptures were "the point of departure motivically, stylistically, and conceptually for von Huene’s production in the interspace between form, sound, movement, and language, and at the same time a result of his graphic and sculptural work from the early 1960s".

Based on the bread and leather sculptures von Huene developed mechanically mobile apparatuses in wood and metal with an electronically controlled inner workings. They evolved from traditional sculptures (Kaleidophonic Dog) into objects which occupy space like items of furniture, which dissolve the traditional duality between sculpture and pedestal to form a unity (Rosebud Annunciator).

=== 1969–1983 ===
During the 1970s, von Huene chose the organ pipe itself as a sculptural form and at the same time as a source of sounds. The sculptures expanded into the surrounding space with their physicality and acoustic intensity (Totem Tones). Perceiving the material weight of the wooden Totem Tones as an imperfection, he started to reduce the visual presence of his sculptures. With minimalist forms and transparent materials, the sculptures alluded to the immateriality of the sounds they generated, which shifted the viewers' perceptual attention, as in the works, Glass Pipes, and Drum I.

The Text Tones (1979, 1982–83) marked the beginning of a shift in artistic intention from a mechanical object that produces sound to an instrument whose sound production uses the entire room. Thus the audience becomes incorporated into the work as an active participant. The metal pipes of the Text Tones are equipped with microphones that receive tones and sounds produced by visitors. The sounds are then altered by computer control, and the resulting modified sound is audible the exhibition space. The visitors are able to recognize and consciously influence the sounds of the Text Tones in real-time, thus communicating directly with the artwork and with other visitors.

=== 1985–1992 ===
From the mid-1980s onwards, von Huene's focus was primarily on the reflection of verbal and body language and the expansion of correspondences between the various visual media. The linguistic decay and a redefinition of the linguistic signs of human expression are thematised in Extended Schwitters, a reference to Kurt Schwitters, the Dadaist and poet of speech sounds, and Lexichaos, an expansive installation based on the History of the Babylonian confusion of languages that breaks down speech and text to the level of letters and sounds.

Since 1985, von Huene's work has moved freely between the creation of sculpturally conceived, figurative automata and spatial installations with various audiovisual media. Dancing on Tables is a synthesis of these different artistic concepts of sculpture and installation. Four lower bodies of male mannequins in trousers and shoes and 14 large-format drawings form a computer-controlled ‘stage play’. Their texts are taken from speeches by leading US politicians. A fifth naked figure dances to classical music.

=== 1995–1998 ===
In addition to technical constructions and artistic processes, von Huene was also concerned with art-historical and aesthetic theories, the practice-oriented aspects of which he incorporated into his artistic concepts. In the second half of the 1990s, he concentrated on language and word choice in art and art history with a new group of works. It was part of the exhibition "What's Wrong with Culture?", Neues Museum Weserburg, Bremen 1998. The eponymous work What's Wrong with Art? is a collage of spoken comments by artists and art critics who interrupt each other to the point where "wrong" and "right" can no longer be distinguished.

Blue Books is another example of this series of works. It is based on a collection of quotations from an older generation of art historians to criticise their interpretations and language (Martin Warnke, 1970). Von Huene combined them with the corresponding images to create a kind of slide show. Two drums function as a projection surfaces and percussion instruments convey this criticism as a visually and acoustically striking lesson on the relationship between artwork and verbal language.

== Selected works in collections ==
- The Magical Flute, 1985; Dancing on Tables, 1988/93; What's wrong with Art?, 1997: Stephan von Huene Archive, ZKM │ Museum für Kunst und Medien, Karlsruhe
- Totem Tone IV, 1969; Text Tones, 1979/82/3: Hamburger Kunsthalle
- Kaleidophonic Dog, 1967: Los Angeles County Museum of Art
- Tap Dancer, 1967: Collection of Nancy Reddin Kienholz
- Rosebud Annunciator, 1967–69: Museum Ludwig, Köln
- Extended Schwitters, 1987: Sprengel Museum, Hannover
- Lexichaos, 1990: Helmholtz Institut at the Humboldt University of Berlin
- Drum II, 1992: Wilhelm Lehmbruck Museum, Duisburg
- The man from Jüterbog, 1995: Hamburger Bahnhof – Nationalgalerie der Gegenwart, Berlin
- The New Lore Ley II, 1997: Max Liebermann Haus, "Brandenburger Tor" Foundation, Berlin
- Sirens Low, 1999: Staatliche Kunstsammlungen Dresden, Albertinum

== Selected exhibitions ==
Solo Exhibitions

- 1969 Los Angeles County Museum of Art, Los Angeles
- 1970 Whitney Museum of American Art, New York
- 1974 Museum of Contemporary Art, Chicago
- 1982 Center for Music Experiments, University of California, San Diego
- 1983 Staatliche Kunsthalle Baden-Baden, Baden-Baden; Kestnergesellschaft, Hannover;
- 1984 Museum Ludwig, Köln;
- 1986 The Faith and Charity in Hope Gallery, curated by Edward Kienholz, Hope, Idaho
- 1990 Klangskulpturen, Louisiana Museum, Humlebæk; Text Tones, Galerie Hans Mayer, Düsseldorf; Lexichaos, Hamburger Kunsthalle, Hamburg
- 1998 What's wrong with Culture? Neues Museum Weserburg, Bremen

Group Exhibitions

- 1967 American Sculpture of the Sixties, New York/Los Angeles/Washington D.C.
- 1967 Electro Magica (International Electric Art Exhibit), Tokio
- 1975 Sound Sculpture, Vancouver Art Gallery, Vancouver, with a collection of essays and LP published by John Grayson, A.R.C.
- 1975 Sehen um zu hören, Düsseldorf/San Francisco
- 1976 37. Venice Biennale (Glas Pipes)
- 1980 Für Augen und Ohren, Akademie der Künste, Berlin
- 1982 Contemporary Music Festival, Los Angeles (Text Tones)
- 1985 Vom Klang der Bilder, Staatsgalerie Stuttgart, Stuttgart
- 1986 Inventionen 86. Musik und Sprache, Akademie der Künste, Berlin
- 1987 documenta 8, Kassel (Text Tones and Extended Schwitters)
- 1993 Artec 93, Nagoya, Japan; Multimediale 3, ZKM, Karlsruhe
- 1995 46. Venice Biennale (Dancing on Tables)
- 1996 Sonambiente, Festival für Hören und Sehen, Akademie der Künste, Berlin
- 2000 Sonic Boom, Hayward Gallery, London; Theatrum Naturae et Artis, Martin-Gropius-Bau, Berlin

Posthumous exhibitions

- 2002/03 Tune the World. Stephan von Huene. Die Retrospektive, Haus der Kunst, München; Stiftung Wilhelm Lehmbruck Museum, Duisburg; Hamburger Kunsthalle
- 2005/06 Stephan von Huene – Grenzgänger, Grenzverschieber, Zentrum für Kunst und Medien (ZKM), Karlsruhe
- 2008 Babylon. Mythos und Wahrheit, Pergamon Museum, Berlin (Lexichaos)
- 2010 Stephan von Huene. The Song of the Line. Die Zeichnungen 1950–1999, Hamburger Kunsthalle, Hamburg/Max Liebermann Haus, Berlin/ZKM, Karlsruhe
- 2014 Art or Sound, Fondazione Prada, Venedig
- 2020/21 Stephan von Huene. What's wrong with art?, Zentrum für Kunst und Medien (ZKM), Karlsruhe
- 2021 Stephan von Huene. Lexichaos, Boulezsaal, Barenboim-Said Akademie, Berlin

== Bibliography (selection) ==
- Schmidt, Katharina, ed. (1983). Stephan von Huene – Klangskulpturen: Staatliche Kunsthalle, Baden-Baden; Museum Ludwig, Köln; Kestnergesellschaft, Hannover; Neue Gesellschaft für Bildende Kunst (exhibition catalogue). With contributions from Stephan von Huene, Allan Kaprow, Thomas von Randow, Wieland Schmied, Katharina Schmidt. Hannover: Kestnergesellschaft.
- Oelschlägel, Petra, ed. (1995). Stephan von Huene: Tischtänzer / Dancing on Tables. With contributions from Horst Bredekamp, Petra Oelschlägel, Stephan von Huene. Ostfildern-Ruit: Cantz. ISBN 3-89322-299-5.
- Deecke, Thomas, ed. (1998). What's wrong with Culture? Stephan von Huene (exhibition catalogue). With contributions from Peter Bürger, Thomas Deecke, Doris von Drathen, Heinz von Foerster, Martin Warnke. Bremen: Neues Museum Weserburg. ISBN 9783894662288.
- Brockhaus, Christoph; Gaßner, Hubertus; Heinrich, Christoph, eds. (2003). Stephan von Huene – Tune the World, Die Retrospektive / The Retrospective: Haus der Kunst, München; Wilhelm Lehmbruck Museum, Duisburg; Hamburger Kunsthalle, Hamburg (exhibition catalogue). With contributions from Joan La Barbara, Horst Bredekamp, Christoph Brockhaus, Wolfgang Kemp, Petra Kipphoff von Huene, Achatz von Müller, Martin Warnke, William Wilson. Ostfildern: Hatje Cantz. ISBN 3-7757-1211-9.
- Könches, Barbara; Weibel, Peter, eds. (2006). Stephan von Huene – Grenzgänger, Grenzverschieber (exhibition catalogue). With contributions from Barbara Könches, Peter Weibel, Achatz von Müller, Achim Heidenreich, Petra Kipphoff von Huene. Karlsruhe: ZKM / Zentrum für Kunst und Medientechnologie. ISBN 3-936-636-885.
- Gaßner, Hubertus; Kipphoff von Huene, Petra, eds. (2010). Stephan von Huene. The Song of the Line. Die Zeichnungen / The Drawings 1950–1999. With contributions from Marvin Altner, Petra Kipphoff von Huene, Johannes von Müller, Petra Oelschlägel. Ostfildern: Hatje Cantz. ISBN 978-3-7757-2642-9.
- von Huene, Stephan (2012). Kipphoff von Huene, Petra; Altner, Marvin (eds.). Die gespaltene Zunge / Split tongue. Texte und Interviews / Texts and Interviews. München: Hirmer. ISBN 978-3-7774-5501-3.
- Muñoz Morcillo, Jesús (2016). Elektronik als Schöpfungswerkzeug. Die Kunsttechniken des Stephan von Huene (1932–2000). Bielefeld: transcript. ISBN 978-3-8376-3626-0.
- Ruccius, Alexis (2019). Klangkunst als Embodiment. Frankfurt/Main: Primat Verlag. ISBN 978-3-96505-000-6.
- Weibel, Peter; Ziegler, Philipp, eds. (2021). Stephan von Huene. What's wrong with Art?. With contributions from Yannis Hadjinicolaou, Stephan von Huene, Martin Warnke, Achim Heidenreich, Philipp Ziegler. München: Hirmer. ISBN 978-3-7774-3729-3.
- Brieler, Philipp; Jahrisch, Robert, eds. (2021). Lexichaos. Stephan von Huene. With contributions from Horst Bredekamp, Marvin Altner, Petra Kipphoff von Huene, Michael Naumann, Petra Kunst. Berlin: Barenboim-Said Akademie.
- Gaßner, Hubertus (2022). Technologie ist die Magie von heute. Hamburg: Hamburger Kunsthalle. ISBN 978-3-93800-267-4.
