= John Miller (American artist) =

American artist & art critic (1954-)

- Born: 1954; Cleveland, Ohio
- Education: 1979 California Institute of the Arts, MFA
- Known for: Contemporary art, painting, sculpture, photography, and video art
- Notable work: Middle of the Day series
- Movement: Abject art
- Awards: Wolfgang Hahn Prize (2011); Deutscher Akademischer Austauschdienst (DAAD) Berliner Kunstlerprogramm, Berlin residency (1991)

John Miller (born 1954) is an artist, writer, and musician based in New York and Berlin.

== Education and early career ==
Miller earned a BFA from the Rhode Island School of Design in 1977. He attended the Whitney Museum of American Art Independent Study Program in 1978, and an MFA from California Institute of the Arts in 1979.

He worked as a gallery attendant at Dia:Chelsea. He is currently professor of Professional Practice in Art History at Barnard College

== Exhibitions ==
A Refusal to Accept Limits (2007), installed at the Rubell Museum DC in 2022

Miller has had several solo museum exhibitions, most recently in 2024 in Kunsthaus Glarus. The Ruin of Exchange presents a selection of Miller’s artwork ranging from 1994 to the present. In 2016, a mid-career survey, "I Stand, I Fall", was held at the Institute of Contemporary Art / ICA, Miami, curated by Alex Gartenfeld. The exhibition "brings together some 75 works that trace Miller's use of the figure throughout his career in order to incisively comment on the status of art and life in American culture." Other solo museum exhibitions include one at the Museum Ludwig Cologne (2011) in conjunction with his being awarded the Wolfgang Hahn Prize, a mid-career retrospective at the Kunsthalle Zürich (2009), the Kunstverein in Hamburg (1999), Le Magasin in Grenoble (1999), and MoMA PS1 in New York (1998). His work was included in the Biennale d'Art Contemporain de Lyon in 2005 and in the 2010 Gwangju Bienniale, 10,000 Lives. In 2014, his artwork was included in the Hayward Gallery’s exhibition, "The Human Factor: the Figure in Contemporary Sculpture."

== Collections ==
Miller's work is in the collections of institutions including the Museum of Contemporary Art, Los Angeles; the Whitney Museum, New York; the Carnegie Museum of Art, Pittsburgh; Museum Ludwig, Cologne, Stedelijk Museum Amsterdam, and theInstitute of Contemporary Art, Miami, as well as private collections and foundations like the Rubell Museum in Miami, Sammlung Ringier, Switzerland, Sammlung Schürmann, Aachen / Berlin and the Sammlung Falkenberg in Hamburg.

== Awards and honors ==
In 2011, Miller received the Wolfgang Hahn Prize from the Society for Contemporary Art at the Museum Ludwig in Cologne. In 1991, he received a fellowship from the Berliner Kunstlerprogramm, German Academic Exchange Service (DAAD).

=== Books ===
In 2000, JRP Edition and the Consortium published The Price Club: Selected Writings, 1977-1996. (Geneva and Dijon: JRP Editions and the Consortium, 2000) In 2001, Revolver Verlag published When Down Is Up: Selected Writings.

JRP-Ringier and the Consortium published a collection of his criticism titled The Ruin of Exchange: Selected Writings in 2012, as part of their Positions series. The Ruin of Exchange is edited by Professor Alexander Alberro (Geneva and Dijon: JRP-Ringier and les Presses du Reel, 2012).

In 2015, Afterall Books published Miller's study Mike Kelley: Educational Complex as part of its One Work series. Miller and artist Mike Kelley met as graduate students at the California Institute of the Arts in the late 1970s.

=== Catalogs ===
- A Refusal to Accept Limits. Zürich, Switzerland: Kunsthalle Zürich and JRP/Ringier Kunstverlag AG, 2010, curated by Beatrix Ruf with texts by Alexander Alberro and Nora Alter, Branden W. Joseph and Jutta Koether.
- Shooting Log. Brussels: MFC- Michèle Didier, 2009.
- Regift. New York: Swiss Institute, 2009 curated by John Miller.
- Between Artists: Maria Eichhorn/ John Miller. New York: A.R.T. Press, 2008.
- Consolation Prize: Mike Kelley and John Miller. Vancouver: University of British Columbia Press, 2001 with texts by Roy Arden, Mike Kelley and John Miller.
- Economies Paralleles/Parallel Economies. Grenoble: Le Magasin, 1999, curated by Yves Aupettitalot and Lionel Bovier with texts by Yves Aupettitalot, Lionel Bovier, Mike Kelley, John Miller, Robert Nickas and Nancy Spector.
- White Studies: Richard Hoeck & John Miller. Vienna: Kunsthalle Wien, 1998 with texts by Gerald Matt, Lucas Gehrmann, and Andreas Spiegl.
- A Trail of Ambiguous Picture Postcards. Kyoto: Korinsha Press /CCA Kitakyushu, Japan, 1997.
- Rock Sucks/Disko Sucks. Berlin: daadgalerie, 1992, texts by Dennis Cooper, Isabelle Graw and Nancy Spector.
- Text. New York: Artist Book, self-published, 1980.
- Cinematic Moments. New York: Artist Book, self-published, 1979.
- Take It or Leave It: Institution, Image, Ideology. New York and London: Prestel in association with the Hammer Museum, Los Angeles, 2014 with texts by Anne Ellegood and Johanna Burton et al.
- American Exuberance. Miami: Rubell Family Collection, 2011, with texts by Kathryn Andrews Frank Benson, John Miller, Richard Prince et al.
- Manifest-O. Brooklyn: New York: Concrete Utopia, 2010, curated by Melanie Kress and Rosie DuPont with foreword by Melanie Kress.
- Middle Man. New York: Three’s Company, 2010, curated by Alex Gartenfeld and Piper Marshall.
- Mapping. New York: Museum of Modern Art, 1994, curated and text by Robert Storr.

=== Publications ===
- "Now Even the Pigs’re Groovin’," Dan Graham: Works, 1965-2000, Düsseldorf: Richter Verlag;republished in Frières américanes, Vincent Pécoil, ed. and trans., Dijon: les presses du reel; Dan Graham: October Files, Alex Kitnick, ed., Cambridge, Massachusetts: the MIT Press.
- "Art Schools, the Internet and the Violin Playing Mermaids: a Conversation between John Miller and Tony Conrad," Mousse Contemporary Art Magazine, No. 28, April–May, 2011: 48-61.
- "Painting, Object, Theater," Monika Baer, (Köln: Verlag der Buchhandlung Walther König, 2011).
- "POP RIGHT NOW: Roundtable with Bettina Funcke, Massimiliano Gioni, John Miller, moderated by Joanna Fiduccia, with a postscript by Boris Groys, and artworks by Darren Bader, Kaleidoscope, No.11 (Summer 2011): pp. 93-105.
- "Tomorrow Is the Question: John Miller on the Art of Ilene Segalove," Artforum, Vol. 50, No. 2 (October 2011): pp. 262–67.
- Mike Kelley - From My Institution to Yours: a Personal Remembrance, art agenda, February, 2012.
- "No," Angela Bulloch (Rotterdam: Witte de Witte Center for Contemporary Art, 2012).
- "The Universal Solvent," Jim Shaw - Left Behind: Essays, edited by Charlotte Laubard and Jim Shaw (Bordeaux: les presses du réel and CAPC musée d'art contemperain de Bordeaux).
