= Johannes Kahrs =

Johannes Kahrs may refer to:

- Johannes Kahrs (artist) (born 1965), German artist
- Johannes Kahrs (politician) (born 1963), German politician
