= Yael Bartana =

Israeli artist, filmmaker and photographer

Yael Bartana יעל ברתנא
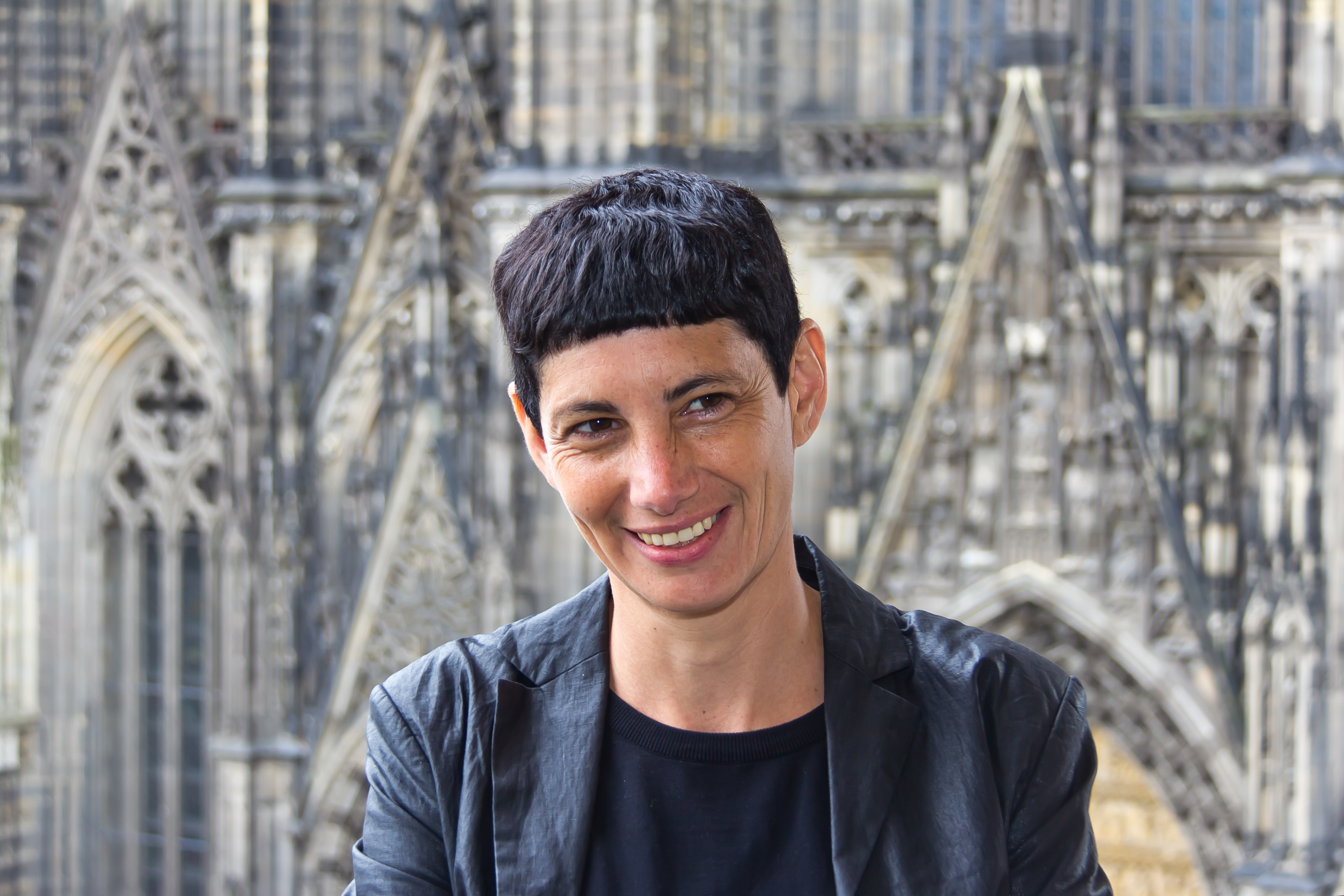
- Yael Bartana, 2013
- Born: 1970 (age 55–56); Kfar Yehezkel, Israel
- Education: Bezalel Academy of Arts and Design, Jerusalem; School of Visual Arts, New York
- Known for: Video art
- Movement: Israeli art
- Website: yaelbartana.com

Yael Bartana (Hebrew: יעל ברתנא; born 1970) is an Israeli artist, filmmaker and photographer, whose past works have encompassed multiple mediums, including photography, film, video, sound, and installation. Many of her pieces feature political or feminist themes.

Bartana's works have been exhibited around the world and been part of collections at museums such as the Museum of Modern Art in New York City, the Tate Modern in London, and the Centre Pompidou in Paris.

Her film trilogy And Europe Will Be Stunned, which discusses the relationship between Judaism and Polish identity, was shown at the Polish pavilion of the 2011 Venice Biennale. She is based in Amsterdam, Berlin, and Tel Aviv.

Bartana's video art has been characterized as "challenging customary categorisations that either pin artists to their country of origin, or see them as participating in an international, increasingly globalised art scene". Her practice has also been described as engrained in the cultural landscape of Israel. "Thus, even though strongly resonating contemporary mobility, Bartana’s oeuvre, like that of many of her peers, is more migratory than global", showing that her work is representative of "difference in transition rather than universal sameness".

== Career ==
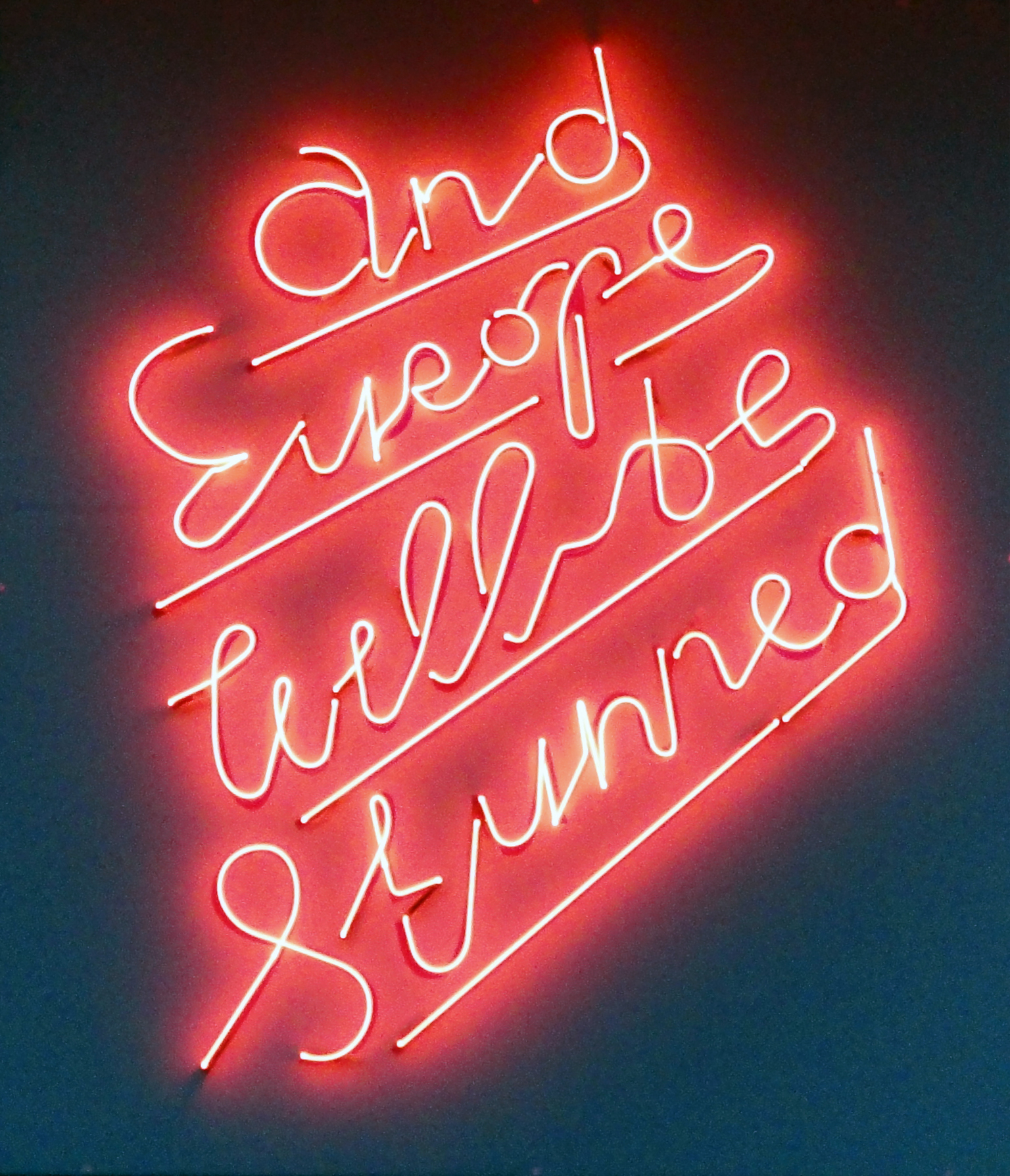
"...and Europe will be stunned", 2012 on the outside wall of Helena Rubinstein Pavilion for Contemporary Art

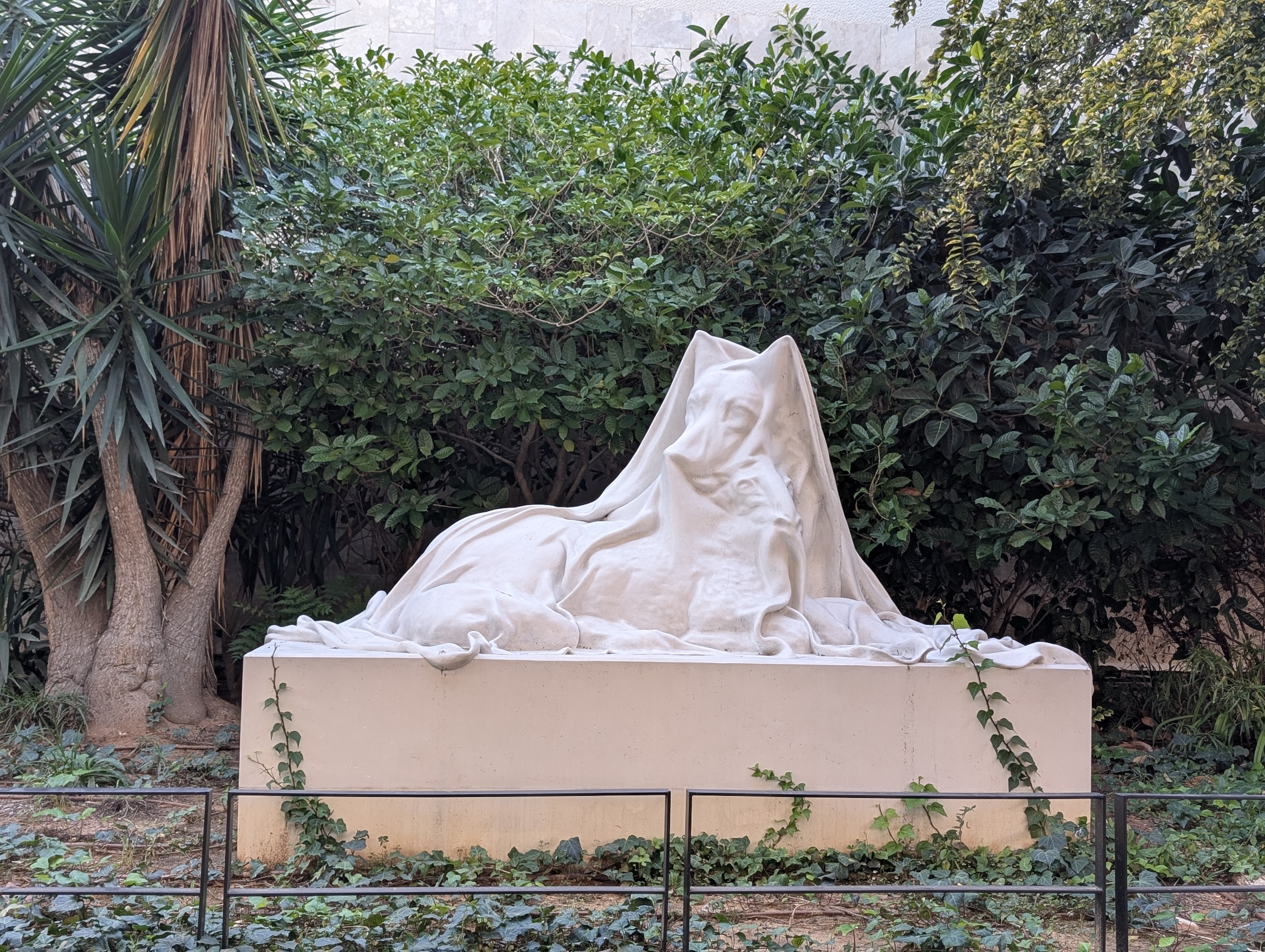
"A Wolf Dwells with a Lamb" on permanent display in Tel Aviv

Between 2006 and 2011, Bartana worked in Poland, creating the trilogy And Europe Will Be Stunned, which examines 19th- and 20th-century Europe as a historic homeland for Ashkenazi Jews. This project discusses the history of Polish-Jewish relations and its influence on the contemporary Polish identity. The trilogy represented Poland in the 54th Venice Biennale, 2011, where she was the first non-Polish citizen to represent Poland. It was acquired in the permanent collection by the Solomon R. Guggenheim Foundation and the Tel Aviv Museum of Art. In recent years, Bartana has increasingly staged her films, and proposed utopic narratives for new chapters of history. Examples include What If Women Ruled the World? (2017), a live performance in which women politicians and professionals meet with a group of actresses playing the representatives of a fictional nation to come up with solutions to stop the approaching Doomsday; and the 2024 installation Farewell in which the utopian (and to some extent dystopian) narratives blurs the notion of time as a concept existing beyond the human mind - as the narratives is played out with history and future existing simultaneously. In 2019, The Guardian named Bartana's And Europe Will Be Stunned as one of "the best art of the 21st century".

== Awards ==
- Dorothea von Stetten Kunstpreis of the Kunstmuseum Bonn in 2004
- Nathan Gottesdiener Foundation Israeli Art Prize (2006)
- Principal Prize by the International Jury and the Prize of the Ecumenical Jury at the Internationale Kurzfilmtage Oberhausen short film festival, Germany (2010)
- Haagendaismo, Madrid (2010)
- Artes Mundi 4 of the National Museum Cardiff, Wales (2010)

== Exhibitions ==
- MIT List Visual Arts Center, Cambridge, Massachusetts, US (2004)
- Museum St. Gallen, St. Gallen, Switzerland (2005)
- Kunstverein Hamburg, Hamburg, Germany (2006)
- The Power Plant, Toronto, Canada (2007)
- Center for Contemporary Art, Tel Aviv, Israel (2008)
- Foksal Gallery, Warsaw, Poland (2008)
- Yael Bartana at P.S.1 (2009)
- Artes Mundi, Cardiff, Wales (2010)
- Moderna Museet, Malmö, Sweden (2010)
- Media City Seoul 2010, Seoul, Korea (2010)
- Art Gallery of Ontario, Toronto, Canada (2012)
- Van Abbemuseum, Eindhoven, Netherlands (2012)
- Walker Art Center, Minneapolis, Minnesota, US (2013–2014)
- Pérez Art Museum Miami, USA (2013–2014)
- Philadelphia Museum of Art, USA (2018–2019)
- Philadelphia Museum of Art, USA (2021)
