= Dorothea von Stetten Art Award =

German art award

The Dorothea von Stetten Art Award (German: Dorothea von Stetten Kunstpreis) has been awarded biennially since 1984 to an artist under the age of 36 whose work demonstrates interesting perspective and possibilities for advancement.

It is not possible to apply for consideration, as an independent nomination committee selects five nominees whose work is then judged by a five strong jury of experts. The jury, which cannot include any person of the nomination committee, has the final decision on who should receive the prize.

The award consists of 10,000 euro and an exhibition in the Kunstmuseum Bonn (Bonn Art Museum ), Germany.

== Former prize winners ==
- 1984 – Sigrun Jakubaschke
- 1986 – Klaus vom Bruch
- 1988 – Jochen Fischer
- 1990 – Barbara Hee
- 1992 – Berend Strik
- 1994 – Thomas Florschuetz
- 1996 – Gregor Schneider
- 1998 – Tamara Grcic
- 2000 – Johannes Kahrs
- 2002 – Nicole Wermers
- 2004 – Yael Bartana
- 2006 – Yves Mettler
- 2008 – Kristoffer Akselbo
- 2010 – Oliver Foulon, Melissa Gordon, Alicja Kwade, Alexandra Leykauf, Tina Schulz
- 2012 – Katinka Bock
- 2014 – Eva Koťátková
- 2016 – Evelyn Taocheng Wang
- 2018 – Masar Sohail
- 2020 – Hannah Weinberger
- 2022 – Zuza Golińska, Daniel Rycharski and Diana Lelonek
- 2024 – Jojo Gronostay, Elisabeth Kihlström and Isa Schieche

== See also ==
- List of European art awards
