= Evelyn Taocheng Wang =

Chinese artist (born 1981)

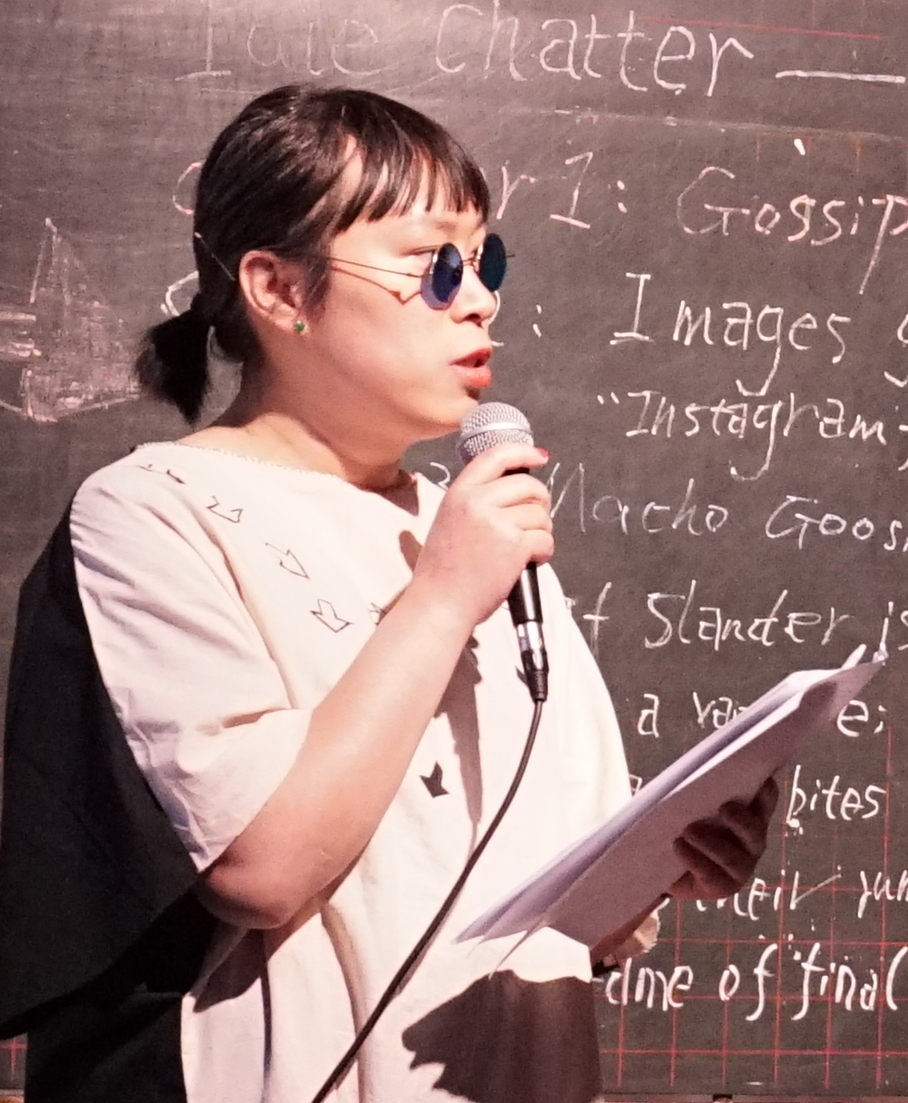
- Evelyn Taocheng Wang in 2020
- Born: 1981 (age 44–45); Chengdu, China
- Occupation: Artist
- Known for: Contemporary art, painting, performance art

Evelyn Taocheng Wang (born 1981) is a Chinese contemporary artist whose work spans multiple disciplines and is known for mapping "how language, custom and culture shape identity."

== Life ==
Wang was born in 1981 in Chengdu, China, where in high school she studied Soviet Realism, the Russian avant-garde, and European modernism. Wang later attended Nanjing Normal University, where she studied Chinese classical literature, calligraphy, and landscape painting.

Wang has noted that while her formal art training began with historic Chinese landscape painting, from early on she sought alternative ways of looking at it. "As students, we visited museums and copied paintings," she said, "but I struggled with the fact that everyone could interpret artworks differently. My suspicion was personal. There was no standard. Where was the master? I felt I was teaching myself, and already at a young age, I enjoyed thinking about who is the amateur and who is the master."

In 2007, Wang left China for a residency in Germany, where Monika Baer encouraged her to study at Städelschule. After graduating in the class of Willem de Rooij, Wang did a residency at De Ateliers in Amsterdam. She has lived in the Netherlands since 2012.

Wang is a transgender woman.

== Work ==
Wang's art spans multiple disciplines including painting, performance, calligraphy and fashion, and has been described by Frieze as mapping "how language, custom and culture shape identity." Her work has also been said to touch on "Dutchness and Germanness, pairing observations on immigration and belonging with reflections on other aspects crucial to our understanding of the self, such as our gender and class presentation or our sense of style."

In addition, Wang's art is noted for drawing upon or referencing feminist authors, such with her 2024 diptych painting on silk Pulling Pushing Dragging that features a calligraphed extract from Octavia E. Butler's novel Patternmaster

In 2025, Wang won the Wolfgang Hahn Prize. As part of the award's related exhibit at the Museum Ludwig, Wang presented new works recreated by memory from the geometric paintings of Agnes Martin. A year earlier at the 60th Venice Biennale, Wang presented her new art series "Do Not Agree with Agnes Martin All the Time," which appropriated Martin's style while also "subverting motifs from classical Chinese painting." ArtAsiaPacific described these works as "ironically melancholic and profoundly sincere," with Wang transposing "Martin's lifelong quest for beauty and serenity through mathematical precision onto commercially produced, rectangular canvases.

== Awards ==
- 2016 Dorothea von Stetten Art Award
- 2016 Volkskrant Visual Arts Prize
- 2018 Dolf Henkes Prize
- 2019 ABN AMRO Art Award
- 2025 Wolfgang Hahn Prize
