= Beat Wyss =

Swiss art historian, professor ordinarius for art history and media theory

Beat Wyss (born 1947) is a Swiss art historian, professor ordinarius for art history and media theory at Karlsruhe University of Arts and Design, Germany, and member of the Heidelberg Academy of Sciences and Humanities.

== Life ==
Beat Wyss was born in 1947 in Basel. He studied art history, philosophy and German literature at the University of Zurich, where he served as assistant lecturer. In 1980, he was awarded a three-year grant by the Swiss National Fund for research stays at the Free University of Berlin (FU) and at the Istituto Svizzero di Roma. From 1986 to 1989 he worked as an editor for the publishing house Artemis (Zürich/Munich) and taught history of architecture and cultural history at the Swiss Federal Institute of Technology Zurich (ETH). After a visiting professorship at Bonn University and a scholarship at the Getty Center in Santa Monica, Wyss was appointed professor for art history by Ruhr University Bochum in 1990. Following a visiting professorship at Cornell University, Ithaca, N.Y., in 1996, he was appointed ordinarius for art history by Stuttgart University in 1997. In 1999, he was visiting professor at Aarhus University, Denmark. In 2001, Wyss was awarded the Art Price of the city of Lucerne. Since 2004 he has been holding the chair in art history and media theory at Karlsruhe University of Arts and Design, where he also served as speaker of the Graduate School „Bild – Körper – Medium“ (Image – Body -Medium) from 2003 to 2009. From 2008 to 2011 he was professorial fellow at the Swiss Institute for Art Research (SIK-ISEA) in Zürich.

== Publications ==
- Renaissance als Kulturtechnik. Philo Fine Arts, Hamburg 2013.
- Die Pariser Weltausstellung 1889. Bilder von der Globalisierung. Insel, Frankfurt 2010.
- Nach den großen Erzählungen. Suhrkamp, Frankfurt am Main 2009.
- Die Wiederkehr des Neuen. Philo & PhiloFineArts / Europäische Verlagsanstalt, Hamburg 2007.
- Vom Bild zum Kunstsystem. 2 volumes, Verlag der Buchhandlung Walther König, Cologne 2006.
- Die Welt als T-Shirt. Zu Ästhetik und Geschichte der Medien. DuMont, Cologne 1997.
- Der Wille zur Kunst. Zur ästhetischen Mentalität der Moderne, DuMont, Cologne 1996.
  - Spanish translation: La voluntad de arte. Madrid 2010.
- Trauer der Vollendung. Zur Geburt der Kulturkritik. Matthes & Seitz, Munich 1985.
  - reprint: DuMont, Cologne 1997.
  - English translation (by Karoline Dobson Saltzwedel): Hegel's Art History and the Critique of Modernity. Cambridge University Press, New York 1999.
