= Museum Ludwig =

Museum in Cologne, Germany

Coordinates: 50°56′27″N 6°57′37″E

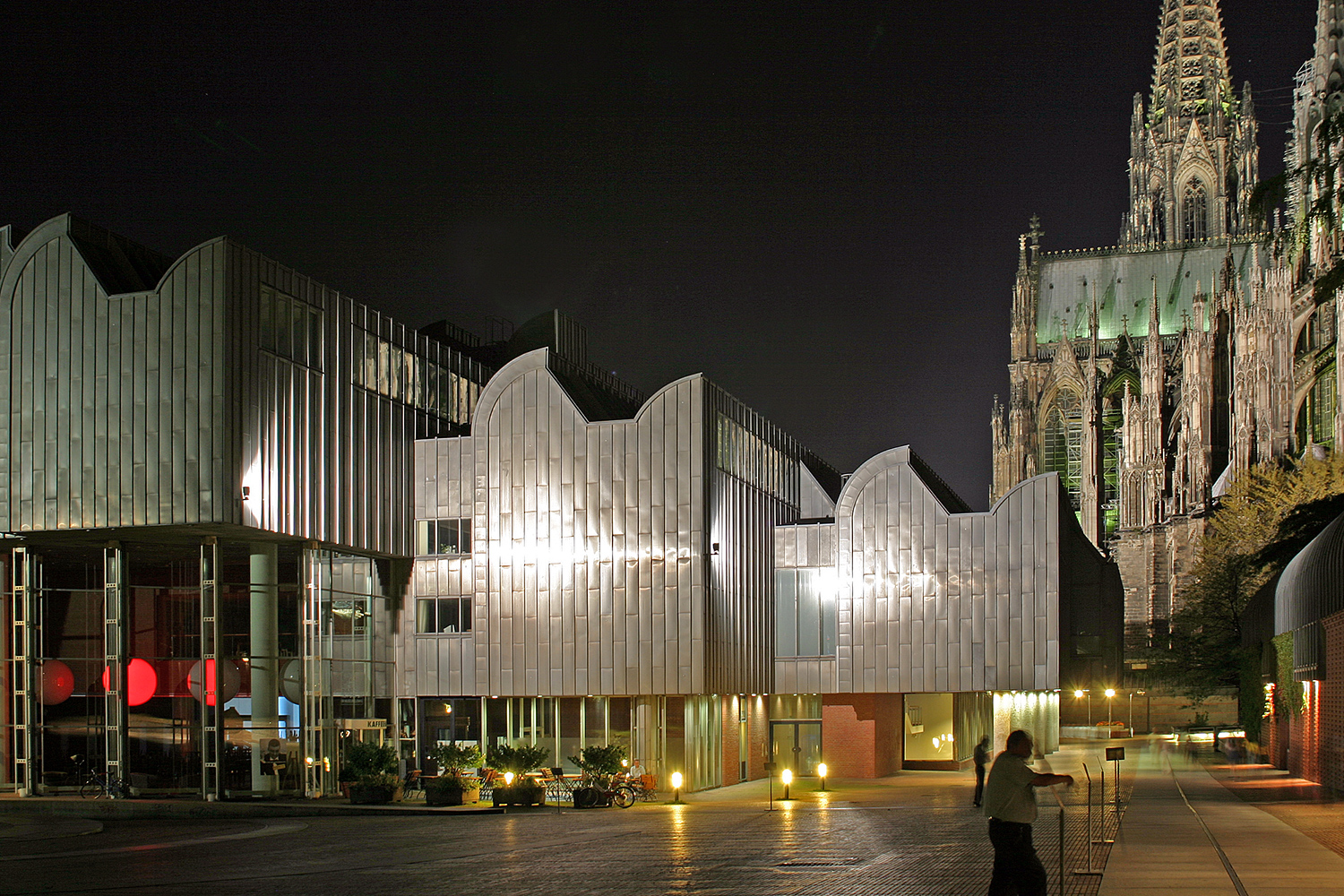
- Museum Ludwig at night, with Cologne Cathedral
- Established: 1976
- Location: Cologne, Germany
- Type: Art museum
- Collection size: Sammlung Haubrich; Sammlung Ludwig
- Director: Yilmaz Dziewior
- Public transit access: 5 16 18 Köln Hbf
- Website: museum-ludwig.de

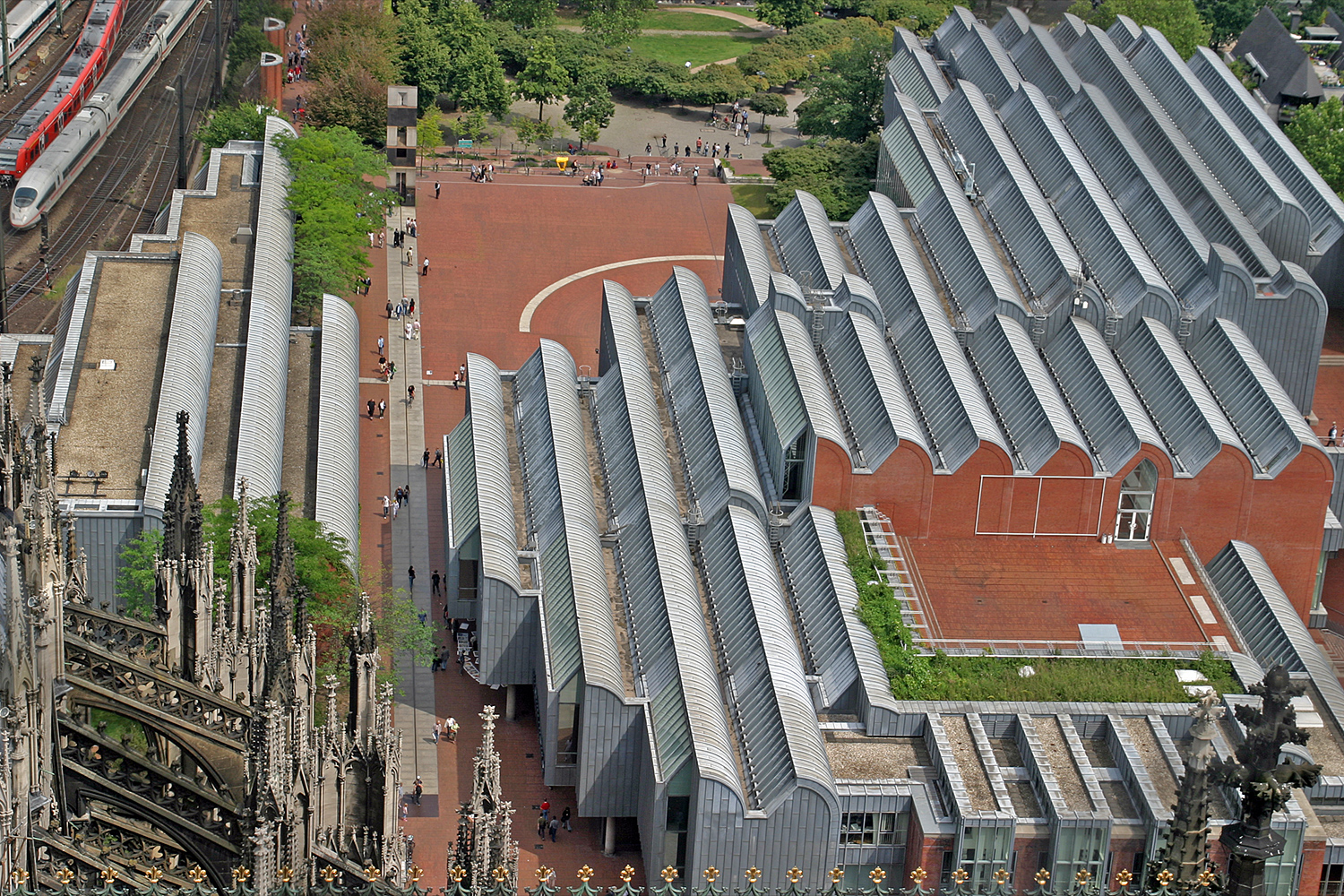
Aerial view

Museum Ludwig, located in Cologne, Germany, houses a collection of modern art. It includes works from Pop Art, Abstract and Surrealism, and has one of the largest Picasso collections in Europe. It holds many works by Andy Warhol and Roy Lichtenstein.

== History ==
The museum emerged in 1976 as an independent institution from the Wallraf-Richartz Museum. That year the chocolate magnate Peter Ludwig agreed to endow 350 modern artworks—then valued at $45 million —and in return the City of Cologne committed itself to build a dedicated "Museum Ludwig" for works made after 1900. The recent building was designed by architects Peter Busmann and Godfrid Haberer and opened in 1986 near the Cologne Cathedral. The new building was home to both the Wallraf Richartz Museum as well as Museum Ludwig. In 1994, it was decided to separate the two institutions and to place the building on Bischofsgartenstrasse at the sole disposal of Museum Ludwig. In 1999, Steve Keene painted in the museum.

The building is home to the Kölner Philharmonie. The Heinrich-Böll-Platz, a public square designed by Dani Karavan, is above the concert hall at the north-east of the building. During concerts people are not permitted to walk on the square, as it creates acoustic disturbances for the concert-goers below.

In 2016 the museum joined forces with the Bell Art Center to organize an unofficial retrospective of Anselm Kiefer, which opened at Beijing’s Central Academy of Fine Arts. The last stop on the tour in China was to be the new Jupiter Museum of Art in Shenzhen, but a delayed museum opening caused the works to be put into storage. At this point the museum lost track of the pieces and began to search for them.

In January 2020 they located the pieces in a warehouse in Shenzhen and attempted to retrieve the piece. They were stopped by Chinese authorities. Diplomatic action has been undertaken by the German Government, the City of Koblenz, and Kiefer himself, to secure the return of the pieces, which include the monumental work Pasiphae.

== Collection ==
The museum essentially incorporates the Sammlung Haubrich, a collection by lawyer Josef Haubrich of art from 1914 to 1939 donated to the city of Cologne in May 1946. Directly after World War II, in May 1946, Haubrich presented the city with his Expressionism collection (Erich Heckel, Karl Schmidt-Rottluff, Ernst Ludwig Kirchner, August Macke, Otto Mueller) and works by other representatives of Classical Modernism (Marc Chagall, Otto Dix). The second integral part of the museum is the Sammlung Ludwig, a collection of art by Picasso, Russian avant-garde and American Pop-art artists.

With around 900 works by Picasso, the museum today has the third largest collection of this artist worldwide, after Barcelona and Paris. Peter Ludwig and his wife Irene later put their collection of the Russian avant-garde on permanent loan to the museum, including 600 works from the period 1905 to 1935 by artists such as Kasimir Malevich, Ljubov Popova, Natalia Goncharova, Mikhail Larionov, and Alexander Rodchenko. Today the museum houses the most comprehensive collection of early Russian avant-garde artworks outside Russia.

=== Works ===
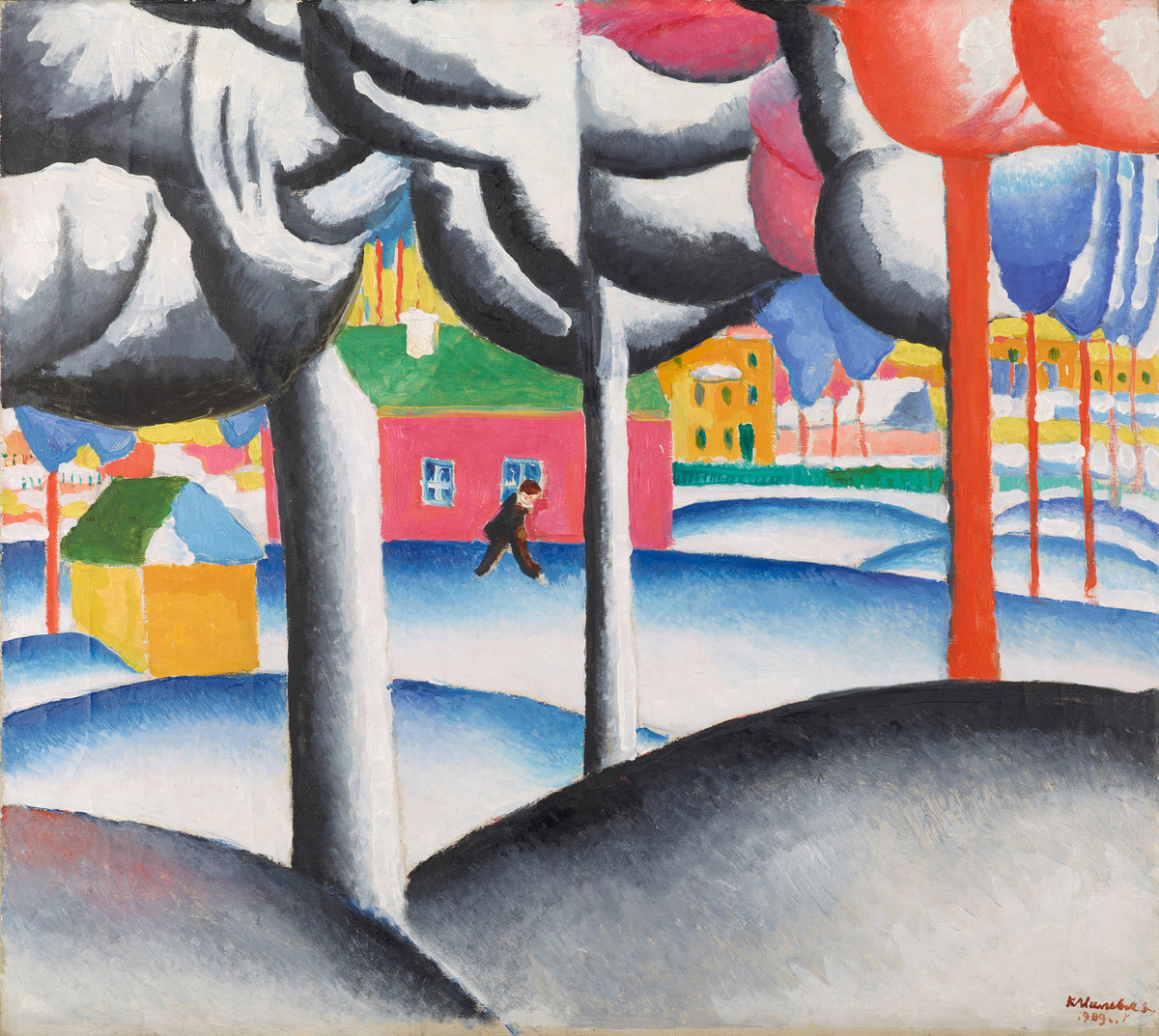
Kazimir Malevich, Landscape (of Winter), 1909

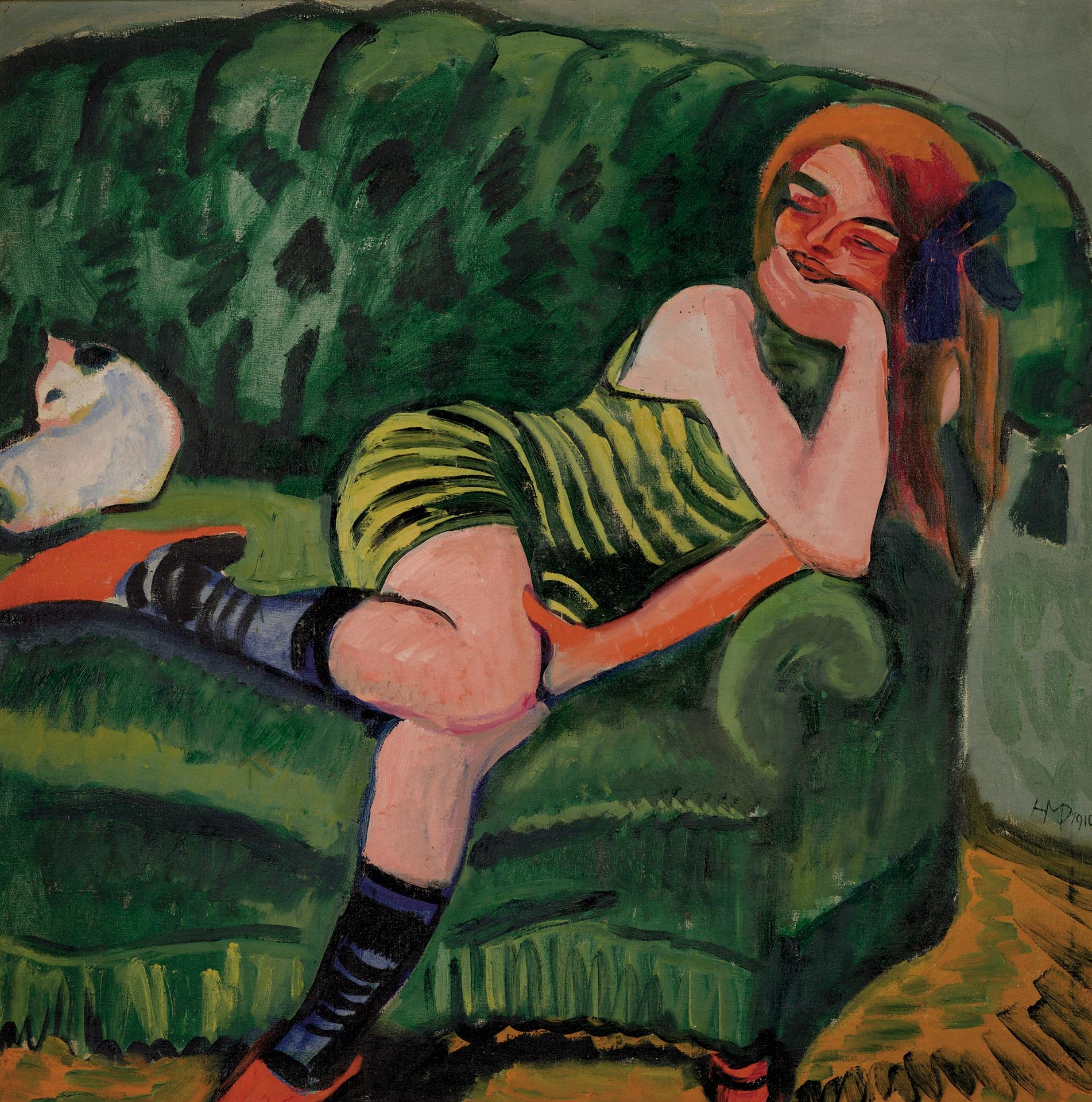
Max Pechstein, The Green Sofa, 1910

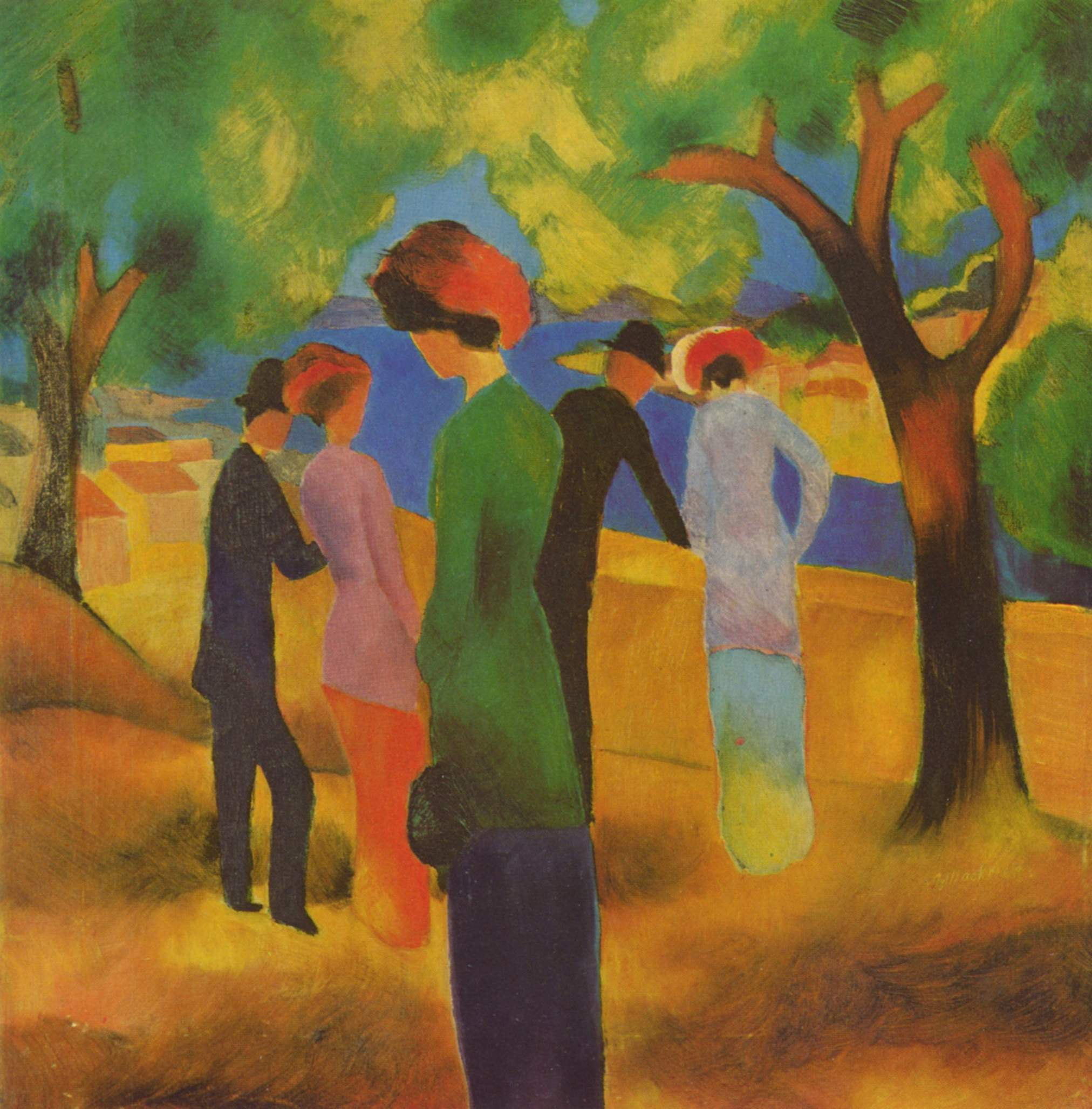
August Macke, Lady in a Green Jacket, 1913

Gottfried Helnwein, Last Supper, 1987

== Selected works of the collection ==
- Pierre Alechinsky : Coupe sombre (1968).
- Josef Albers : Green Scent (1963).
- Peter Blake : ABC Minors (1955), Bo Diddley (1963).
- Salvador Dalí : La Gare de Perpignan (1965).
- Otto Dix : Bildnis des Dr. Hans Koch (1921), Vorstadtszene (1922), Mädchen mit rosa Bluse (1923), Bildnis Frau Dr. Koch (1923).
- Richard Estes : Food Shop / Snack-bar (1967).
- Natalia Goncharova : Nature morte à la peau de tigre (1908), Portrait de Larionov (1913), Vendeuse d'oranges (1916).
- Duane Hanson : Woman with a Purse / Femme au sac en bandoulière (1974).
- Jasper Johns : Untitled (1972).
- Allen Jones : Figure Falling / Chute (1964), Perfect Match / Partenaire idéale (1966–1967).
- Edward Kienholz : Night of Nights / Nuit des nuits (1961), The Portable War Memorial / Monuments aux morts portable (1968).
- Jean Le Gac : Le Peintre aux scabieuses / Der Maler mit Ackerwitwenblumen (1977).
- Roy Lichtenstein : Takka-Takka (1962), Mad Scientist / Le savant fou (1963), M-Maybe / P-Peut-être (1965), Explosion n° 1 (1965), Study for Preparedness / Étude pour Disponibilité (1968)
- László Moholy-Nagy : Grau-Schwarz-Blau / Gris-Noir-Bleu (1920), Auf weissen Grund / Sur fond blanc (1923).
- Kenneth Noland : Provence (1960), Shadow Line / Ligne d'ombre (1967).
- Claes Oldenburg : The Street / La rue (1960), Success Plant / Félicitations pour l'avancement (1961), White Shirt with Blue Tie / Chemise blanche et cravate bleue (1961), Green Legs with Shoes / Jambes vertes avec chaussures (1961)
- Eduardo Paolozzi : The Last of the Idols (1963).
- Robert Rauschenberg : Odalisque (1955–1958), Allegory / Allégorie (1959–1960), Wall Street (1961), Black Market / Marché noir (1961), Axle / Axe (1964), Bible Bike (Borealis) (1991).
- Gerhard Richter : Ema (Akt auf einer Treppe) / Ema (Nude on a Staircase) (1966), 48 Porträts / 48 Portraits (1971/72), Betty (1977), 11 Scheiben / Eleven Panes (2003).
- James Rosenquist : Rainbow / Arc-en-ciel (1961), Untitled (Joan Crawford says...) / Sans titre (Joan Crawford dit...) (1964), Horse blinders / Œillères pour cheval (1968–1969), Starthief / Voleur d'étoiles (1980).
- George Segal : Woman washing her Feet in a Sink / Femme se lavant les pieds dans un lavabo (1964–1965), The Restaurant Window I / La fenêtre du restaurant I (1967).
- Frank Stella : Seven Steps (1959), Ctesiphon III (1968), Bonin Night Heron No. 1 (1976).
- Wolf Vostell : Coca-Cola, Dé-coll/age (1961), Homage to Henry Ford and Jaqueline Kennedy (1967), Miss America (1968).
- Andy Warhol : Two Dollars Bills (Front and Rear) / 80 billets de deux dollars (recto et verso) (1962), 129 Die in Jet (Plane Crash) / 129 morts (catastrophe aérienne) (1962), Close Cover before Striking (Pepsi-Cola) / Refermer avant d'allumer (Pepsi Cola) (1962), Do it Yourself (Landscape) / Modèle pour peintres amateurs(paysage) (1962), Two Elvis / Double Elvis (1963), Red Race Riot / Émeute raciale rouge (1963), Boxes / Boîtes (1964), Flowers / Fleurs (1964).
- Tom Wesselmann : Bathtub 3 / Baignoire 3 (1963), Landscape No.2 / Paysage n° 2 (1964), Great American Nude / Grand nu américain (1967).

== Wolfgang Hahn Prize ==
Since 1994 the Friends of the Museum Ludwig have honoured each year an international artist with the ‘Wolfgang Hahn Prize’, presented during the city's art fair Art Cologne. Both the annual highlight of the Friends' activities and one of the cultural features of Cologne and the Rhineland, this purchase prize is dedicated to the memory of Wolfgang Hahn (1924–1987), chief conservator and painting restorer at Wallraf Richartz Museum / Museum Ludwig and one of Cologne's most far-sighted collectors. The budget for the prize amounts to a maximum of 100,000 euros per annum. The museum also acquires a work from each prizewinner.

An international jury chooses from the nominations submitted by the members. The Wolfgang Hahn Prize has been awarded to the following artists:

- 1994 – James Lee Byars
- 1995 – Lawrence Weiner
- 1996 – Günther Förg
- 1997 – Cindy Sherman
- 1998 – Franz West
- 1999 – Pipilotti Rist
- 2000 – Hubert Kiecol
- 2001 – Raymond Pettibon
- 2002 – Isa Genzken
- 2003 – Niele Toroni
- 2004 – Rosemarie Trockel
- 2005 – Richard Artschwager
- 2006 – Mike Kelley
- 2007 – none awarded
- 2008 – Peter Doig
- 2009 – Christopher Wool
- 2010 – Peter Fischli & David Weiss
- 2011 – John Miller
- 2012 – Henrik Olesen
- 2013 – Andrea Fraser
- 2014 – Kerry James Marshall
- 2015 – Michael Krebber, R. H. Quaytman
- 2016 – Huang Yong Ping
- 2017 – Trisha Donnelly
- 2018 – Haegue Yang
- 2019 – Jac Leirner
- 2020 – Betye Saar
- 2021 – Marcel Odenbach
- 2022 – Frank Bowling
- 2023 – Francis Alÿs
- 2024 – Anna Boghiguian
- 2025 – Evelyn Taocheng Wang

== Directors ==
- 1978–1984: Karl Ruhrberg
- 1984–1991: Siegfried Gohr
- 1991–1997: Marc Scheps
- 1997–2000: Jochen Poetter
- 2002–2012: Kasper König
- 2012–2014: Philipp Kaiser
- 2015–present: Yilmaz Dziewior

== Nazi looted art ==
In 1999 the museum returned the painting Zwei weibliche Halbakte (Two Female Nudes ) (1919) by Otto Mueller to the heirs of Dr. Ismar Littmann. In February 2000 the museum returned La Grappe de Raisins (1920) by Louis Marcoussis (1883–1941) to the family of El Lissitzky and Sophie Lissitzky-Küppers.

In 2013 the city of Cologne agreed that the Ludwig Museum should restitute six valuable drawings looted by the Nazis from the Jewish art collector Alfred Flechtheim to his heirs. The drawings are by Karl Hofer, Paula Modersohn-Becker, Ernst Barlach, Aristide Maillol and Wilhelm Morgner. The Ludwig Museum also agreed to restitute five drawings by Ernst Ludwig Kirchner, Erich Heckel and Georges Kars to the heirs of Curt Glaser.

== See also ==
- List of museums in Cologne
- List of largest art museums
