= Marie-Jo Lafontaine =

Belgian artist (1950–2026)

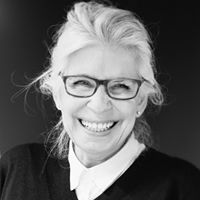
- Lafontaine in 2018
- Born: 17 November 1950; Antwerp, Belgium
- Died: 28 May 2026 (aged 75)
- Education: La Cambre
- Awards: Wilhelm-Loth-Preis (1995); European Photography Award (1996)

Marie-Jo Lafontaine (17 November 1950 – 28 May 2026) was a Belgian sculptor and video artist. She lived and worked as a Professor of Media Arts at the Karlsruhe University of Arts and Design in Brussels.

== Life and career ==
Lafontaine was from Antwerp (Anvers), Belgium. She studied from 1975 to 1979 at l'École nationale supérieure d'architecture et des arts visuels.

She worked in many media including "tapestries" in which she weaved black-dyed wool into linear patterns; sculptural work using plaster, concrete, and lead; and photography. In 1980, Lafontaine started using video in her sculptures and created installations and environments utilizing video.

Lafontaine was awarded the Prix de la Jeune Peinture Belge in 1977. She also received a FIACRE grant from the French Ministry of Culture in 1986, and in 1996 the European Photography Award.

Critic Konstanze Thümmel describes the dominating themes in her post-1980s video work as "association between Eros and Thanatos, passion and reason," and that Lafontaine explores these "...through powerful images of people and animals in extreme situations."

In 2006 she was chosen as an artist for the Sky Arena Project and her video “I Love the World” was screened at the opening ceremony of the FIFA World Cup in Frankfurt, Germany.

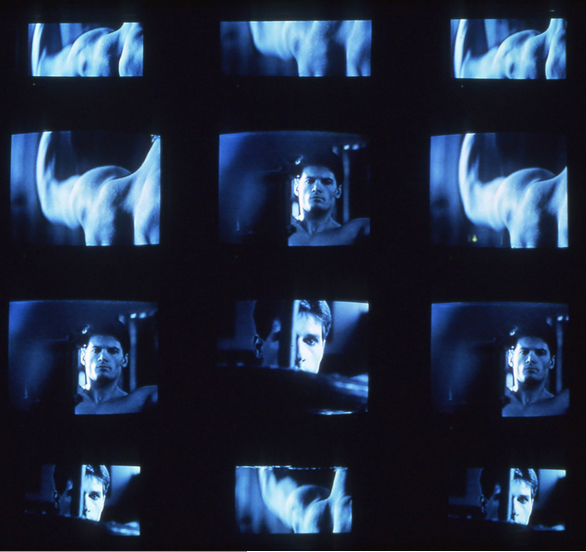
Partial View of Les larmes d'acier

She is best known for her work Les larmes d'acier (1986).

Lafontaine died on 28 May 2026, at the age of 75.

== Awards ==
- Prix de la Jeune Peinture Belge (1977)
- Prix de la Critique (Antwerp, 1979)
- Wilhelm-Loth-Preis (Darmstadt, 1995)
- European Photography Award (1996)
- Award for Photography, Photo 98 (UK, 1997)
- Kunst am Bau competition prize (Bonn, 2000)
- Art for the Pier F award (Stockholm, 2002)
- Kunst am Bau competition prize (Osnabrück, 2003)
- Sky Arena Project competition prize (Frankfurt, 2006)
- Shanghai Fashion & Culture Media Award (Shanghai, 2008)
- Prix Edward Steichen (Luxemburg, 2009)
- AZ Zeno competition prize (Knokke-Heist, 2017)
