= Richard Hoeck =

Austrian artist (1965-)

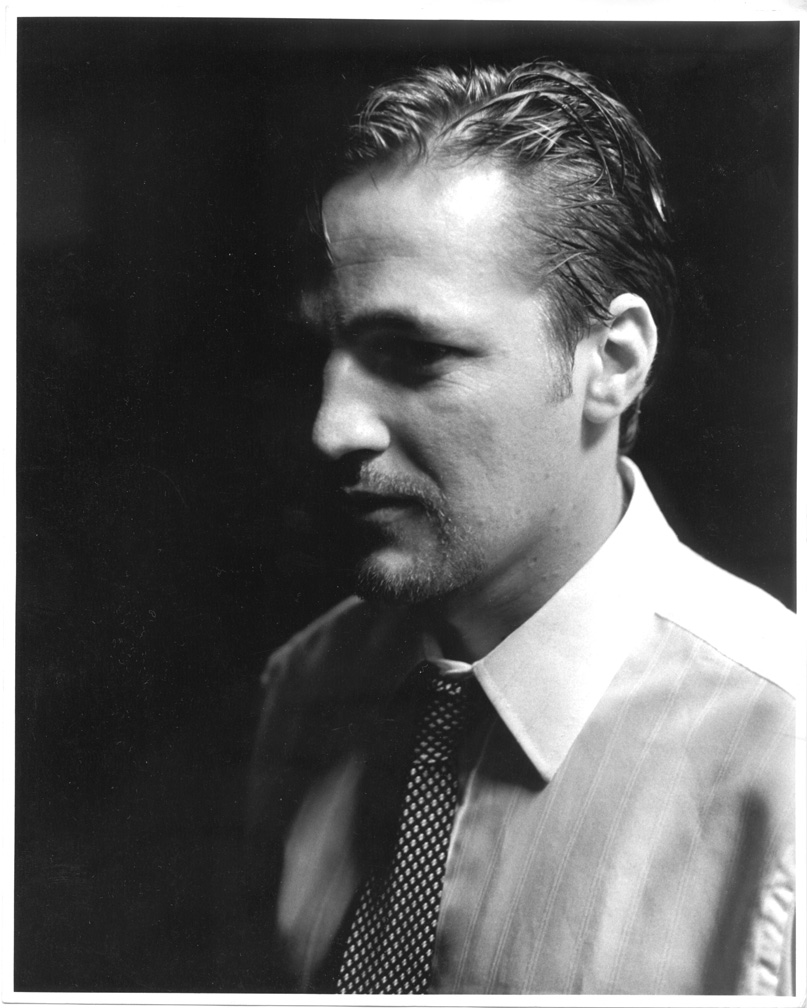
- Hoeck in 1995
- Born: 1965 (age 60–61); Hall, Tyrol, Austria
- Education: 1983 to 1990 University of Applied Arts Vienna
- Known for: contemporary art, painting, sculpture, photography, and video art.
- Notable work: Last Words (2023/2024), Paris ReFake Sieben Säulen (2016), Swarovski Brass Knuckles (2009)
- Movement: Abject art

Richard Hoeck (born 1965 in Hall) is an Austrian conceptual artist based in Vienna.

== Career ==
From 1983 to 1990, Hoeck studied at the University of Applied Arts Vienna under Ernst Caramelle and Oswald Oberhuber. He received the MoMA PS1 Scholarship in New York City (1993–1994) which culminated in a presentation as part of the exhibition “P.S.1 Studio Artists”. The studio programme offered him an early opportunity to present his work within the New York art context. He later received the MAK Schindler Scholarship in Los Angeles (2001–2002). In 2000, he was awarded the Blinky Palermo Scholarship by the Free State of Saxony and presented the exhibition The Additional Bedroom at the Galerie für Zeitgenössische Kunst in Leipzig.

Hoeck has exhibited both nationally and internationally, including shows at the Museum Moderner Kunst Stiftung Ludwig (mumok) in Vienna, the 3rd Istanbul Biennial, the 33rd Bienal de São Paulo, and the Contemporary Art Museum in Houston, Texas.

In 2021, Hoeck contributed to the ORF/BR television film Der weiße Kobold, directed by Marvin Kren. Alongside artists Martin Grandits and Christian Anwander, he was commissioned to create original artworks for the production, which explores Vienna's contemporary art scene in a comedic setting.

== Works ==
Hoeck's conceptual practice spans installation, sculpture, performance, photography, and video. His work often operates at the intersection of stage design, socio-critical commentary, and the construction of alternative infrastructures. His works are part of several public and private collections, including the Museum Moderner Kunst Stiftung Ludwig (mumok) in Vienna and the Metropolitan Museum of Art in New York City.

In his ongoing collaborations with American artist John Miller, Hoeck frequently uses mannequins to interrogate the concept of subjectivity. Positioned within staged environments derived from pop culture and digital spaces, these works explore perceptions of social conditions and visual iconography. The monograph More Alive Than Those Who Made Them (University of Chicago Press / WhiteWalls, 2015) documents this collaborative series. In 2025, Hoeck's 2015 video work Mannequin Death was featured in the exhibition Camera Obscura at Public Gallery, London, which explored the tension between bodily representation and surveillance aesthetics. His collaboration with John Miller titled Last Words (2023–2024), exhibited at Magazin 4 in Bregenz, explores themes of entropy, mortality and dismemberment through the lens of film and sculptural installation. The project received critical attention in the Austrian art journal Kultur und Gesellschaft.

Hoeck's work was included in the exhibition *Ins dunkle schwimmen*, curated by the University of Applied Arts Vienna (2023). The group show focused on perception, hallucination, and inner images. Hoeck's contribution reflects his continued interest in "the intersection of physical presence and virtual absence" and connects bodily fragments to "processes of inner projection". Hoeck presented the performance Paris ReFake Sieben Säulen (2016) at Belvedere 21, Vienna, as a conceptual response to Franz West's original performance with Sieben Säulen from 1990. The reinterpretation was executed in the spirit of a "fake" and included references to Samuel Beckett and Constantin Brâncuși's modular sculpture columns.

In the object-based work series Swarovski Brass Knuckles, Hoeck modified commercially available brass knuckles by setting them with Swarovski crystals, transforming them into display objects that juxtapose ornamental aesthetics with the form of a weapon. According to the artist, the crystals were provided by Swarovski CEO free of charge, Swarovski reportedly purchased several of the finished pieces afterwards.

A comprehensive portrait published in Spike Art Quarterly analyzed Hoeck's critical engagement with American popular myths. His videos and installations deconstruct stereotypical narratives while simultaneously reflecting on the desires of Western consumer societies. The article particularly emphasized his collaboration with John Miller and the ironic inversion of gender roles and representations.

In 1999, Hoeck participated in the exhibition Sommeraccrochage, curated by Klaus Biesenbach at the KW Institute for Contemporary Art in Berlin. The exhibition included works by Sol LeWitt, Tracey Moffatt, Tobias Rehberger, John Miller and Monica Bonvicini, placing Hoeck’s contribution in a high-profile international context. An image of his work Hard Hat (1999) appears in the publication KW – A History. 30 Years of KW Institute for Contemporary Art (Distanz Verlag, 2021).

== Selected works ==
- Last Words (2023/2024)
- Apparatus (2015/2023)
- Paradigmatic Pose of the Arc de Sercle (2021)
- Debris #1 (2020)
- You Turn Me On Death Man (2017)
- Paris ReFake Sieben Säulen (2016)
- Mannequin Death (2015)
- Swarovski Brass Knuckles (2009)
- Camouflage on a Mannequin (2008)
- Hard Hat (1999)
- Belly Dancer for Martin Kippenberger (1997); Video, Belvedere Wien, Inv.-Nr. 10966.
- Untitled (Porch) (1996)

== Selected exhibitions ==
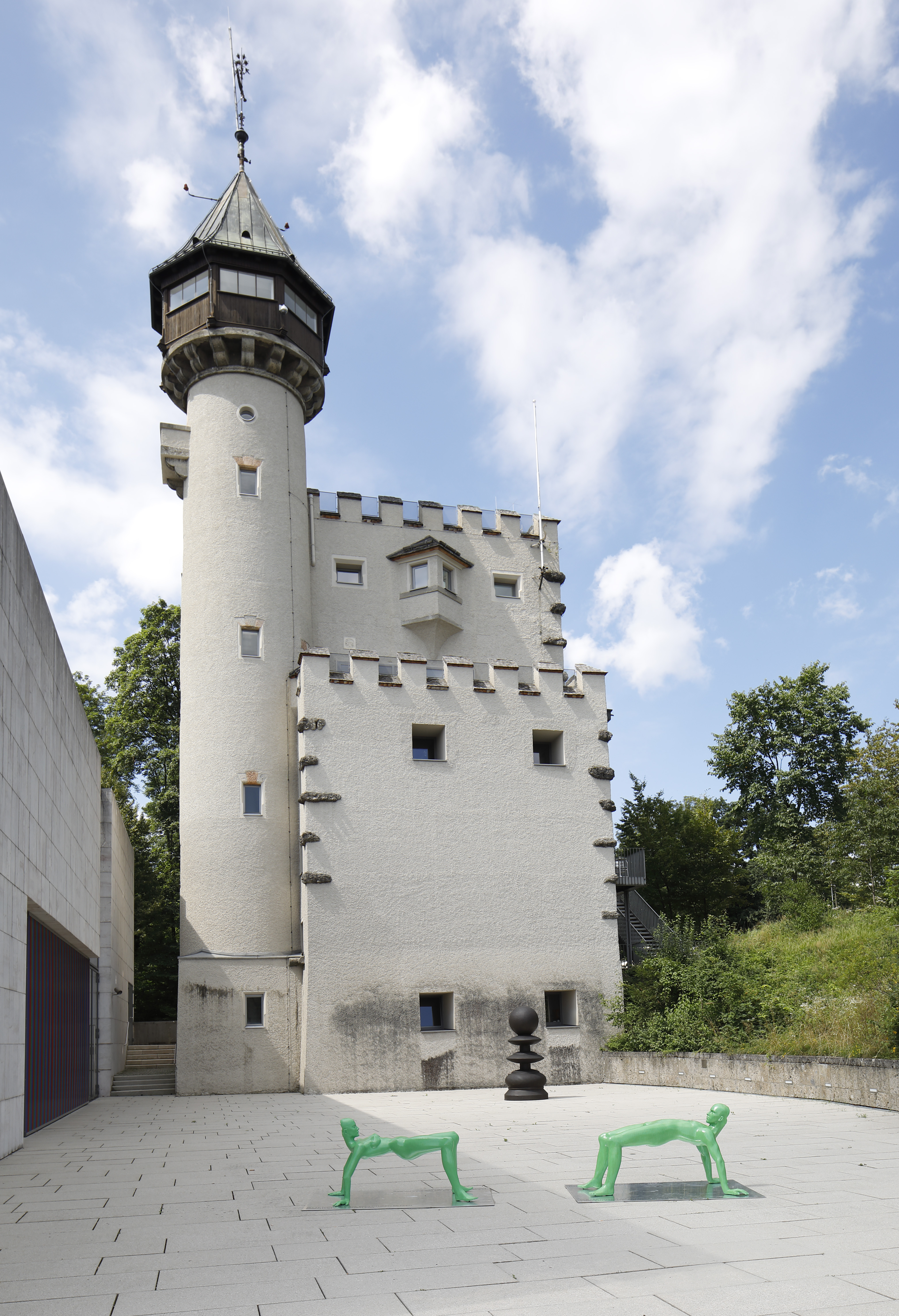
Installation of "Arch of Hysteria, Between Madness and Ecstasy" by Richard Hoeck at the Museum der Moderne Salzburg, 2023

Richard Hoeck's installation Arch of Hysteria was presented at the Museum der Moderne Salzburg in 2023. The exhibition explored themes of madness, ecstasy, and formal repetition in contemporary sculpture.

Below is a selection of further exhibitions:

- Last Words (with John Miller), Magazin 4, Bregenz, Austria (2023/2024)
- Arch of Hysteria, Zwischen Wahnsinn und Ekstase, Museum der Moderne Salzburg (2023)
- Toxic (with John Miller & Peter Friedl), Tiroler Landesmuseum Ferdinandeum, Innsbruck, Austria (2023)
- Houston, Sie haben ein Problem! (with Paul Renner), Contemporary Art Museum, Houston, USA (2022)
- Autohaus St. Marx, Neuer Kunstverein Wien, Vienna (2021)
- Window Shopping, Gabriele Senn Galerie, Vienna (2020)
- The Ecstasy of Becoming Trash, Gabriele Senn Galerie, Vienna (2020)
- Strange Attractors: The Anthology of Interplanetary Folk Art, Reding Fine Art, Los Angeles (2017)
- Something for Everyone (with John Miller), Meliksetian Briggs, Los Angeles (2013)
- Sommeraccrochage, KW Institute for Contemporary Art, Berlin (1999)

== Exhibitions images ==
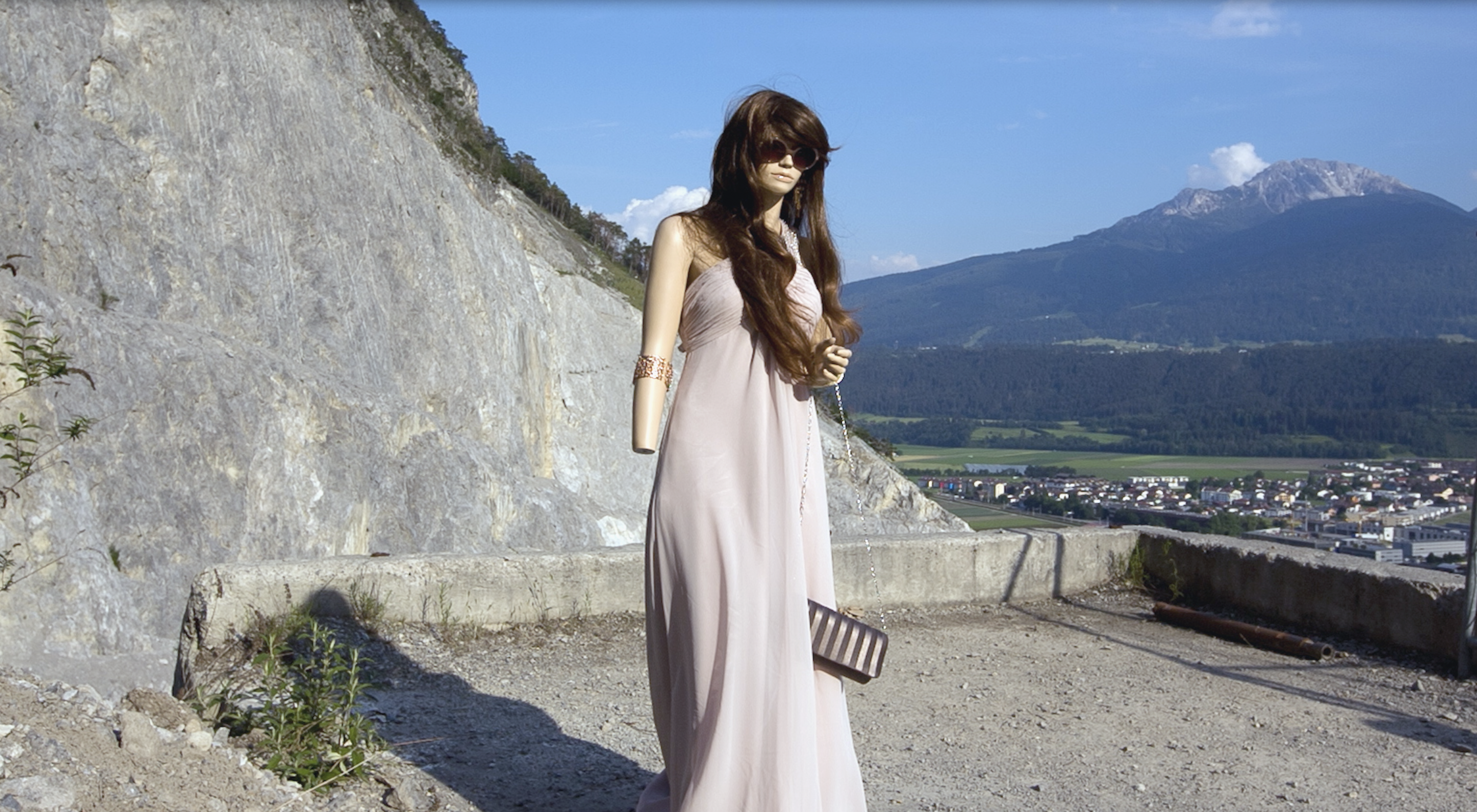
Still from the video Mannequin Death (2015).

== Books ==
- More Alive Than Those Who Made Them: John Miller & Richard Hoeck, 2015, WhiteWalls Inc. ISBN 978-0945323266

== Catalogs ==
- White Studies: Richard Hoeck & John Miller. Vienna: Kunsthalle Wien, 1998 with texts by Gerald Matt, Lucas Gehrmann, and Andreas Spiegl.

== Image credits ==
- Installation view: "Arch of Hysteria, Between Madness and Ecstasy", 2023. Photo: Museum der Moderne Salzburg www.museumdermoderne.at/en
- Source image: Paradigmatic Pose of the Arc de Sercle
- Foto Aktion Murnockerl (1991): © de:Christian Wachter, www.christian-wachter.at
- Foto Tumbleweed (1998): © Maria Kirchner, www.mariakirchner.at
- Still Mannequin Death (2015): © Richard Hoeck, www.richardhoeck.com
- Fotos The Ecstasy of Becoming Trash (2020) and Deliveries in the Rear (2024): © Manuel Carreon Lopez / www.kunst-dokumentation.com
