= Karlsruhe University of Arts and Design =

Public university in Germany

Coordinates: 49°00′06″N 8°23′02″E

- Established: 15 April 1992
- President: Sami Khatib (acting rector)
- Students: 412 WS 2014–15
- Location: Karlsruhe, Baden-Württemberg, Germany
- Website: Official website

The Karlsruhe University of Arts and Design (German: Staatliche Hochschule für Gestaltung Karlsruhe; HfG) is a state art college founded in 1992 in Karlsruhe, Germany. It focuses on media art, communication design, product design, exhibition design and scenography, art research, and media philosophy, with a strong interdisciplinarity between the departments. The university has about 400 students.

== History ==
The university was opened on 15 April 1992 as a reform college in Karlsruhe. Together with the Center for Art and Media Karlsruhe (ZKM) it was founded during the years 1989 to 1992 by Heinrich Klotz. This combination of teaching, research and exhibition institutions corresponds to the self-imposed artistic and pedagogical task of relating the traditional arts to media technology and electronic manufacturing processes.

Classical forms such as painting were only represented with a professorship until 2004. Interdisciplinary work should be promoted by linking artistic, applied and theoretical courses. With bringing together media art, art theory and design Klotz wanted to found an "electronic Bauhaus". Since 1997, the HfG Karlsruhe as well as the ZKM is housed in a listed former ammunition factory.

After the death of Klotz in 1999, Gunter Rambow took over the provisional management of the university. In early 2001, Peter Sloterdijk was appointed rector, which he remained until his retirement in 2015. After a transitional phase under Deputy Rector Volker Albus, Siegfried Zielinski's term of office began in February 2016. In December 2017 according to own information Zilinski asked the Minister of Science, Research and Art Baden-Württemberg for the early termination of his contract. As a reason, he stated that his reform ideas were not enforceable. Since 1 April 2018 Johan F. Hartle has taken over the position of acting Rector at the Karlsruhe University of Arts and Design.

== Study ==
The interdisciplinary framework of the early years is still being preserved by the four practical departments

- Exhibition Design and Scenography,
- Communication Design,
- Media Art and
- Product Design

as well as the theoretical department

- Art Research and Media Philosophy

Common to all degree courses is the project work practiced from the beginning, as well as continued cooperation with the neighboring ZKM. In-house workshops and studios were also set up for the practice-oriented training of the HfG students.

For the students of the theoretical subjects the choice of a practical secondary subject is obligatory. The students of the practical subjects are obliged to study a theory subject such as art research or media philosophy as a minor subject. The four practical study programs of the HfG Karlsruhe are permeable fields of study, which allow intensive connections to other subjects and, depending on the research and development focus of the specific university teacher, receive different emphases. The media-theoretical analysis permeates the practical events, on the other hand, the media-theoretical and art-research training is concretized by an immediate practical relevance.

Prerequisite for admission to the program is the general or subject-related higher education entrance qualification as well as the successful completion of an entrance examination.

== Degree ==
At the HfG Karlsruhe, no Bachelor/Master programs are offered, as from the first semester on the project study with contents that can not be modularized, is practiced. The HfG Karlsruhe still awards the internationally recognized diploma or Magister's degree. On the basis of the Magister's degree a doctorate (Dr. phil.) in art theory, media theory and philosophy is also possible. The international Bologna compatibility of HfG degrees is guaranteed. In 2008, the Wissenschaftsrat certified the HfG Karlsruhe an "excellent training concept" in its evaluation report.

== Departments ==
Name of the degree in brackets.

- Media art (Diploma) with the teaching areas
  - Digital Art/InfoArt
  - Movie
  - Photography
  - Sound
  - 3D-Laboratory
  - Game-Lab
- Product design (Diploma)
- Communication Design (Diploma)
- Exhibition Design and Scenography (Diploma) with the teaching areas
  - Scenography
  - Exhibition Design
  - Curatorial Studies and Dramaturgical Practice
- Art Research and Media Philosophy (Magister) with the teaching areas
  - Art Research and Media Theory
  - Philosophy and aesthetics

== Professors ==
- Paul Bailey (Communication Design)
- Matthias Bruhn (Philosophy and Media Theory)
- Céline Condorelli (Media Exhibition Design)
- Filipa César (Time Based Media und Performance)
- Charlotte Eifler (Media Art/Film)
- Constanze Fischbeck (Scenography)
- Line-Gry Hørup (Communication Design)
- Marine Hugonnier (Media Art/Film)
- Diana McCarty (Time Based Media and Performance)
- Sami Khatib (Art Research and Media Philosophy)
- Susanne Kriemann (Media Art/Artistic Photography)
- Tereza Ruller (Communication Design and Digital Practices)
- Isabel Seiffert (Communication Design)
- Simon Sheikh (Critical Theory and Media Philosophy)
- Wieki Somers (Product Design)
- Nina Zschocke (Art Studies)

=== Former professors ===
- Werner Aisslinger (Product Design)
- Volker Albus (Product Design)
- Hans Beller (Film)
- Hans Belting (Art Research)
- Michael Bielický (Info-Art/Digital Media)
- Martin Bohus (Media Art/Film)
- Klaus vom Bruch (Media Art)
- Michael Clegg (Artistic Photography)
- Didi Danquart (Media Art/Film)
- Louis Philippe Demers (Media Exhibition Design)
- Anja Dorn (Curatorial Studies and Dramaturgical Practice)
- Anne Duk Hee Jordan (Digital Arts)
- Elger Esser (Media Art/Photography)
- Omer Fast (Media Art)
- Vadim Fishkin (New Media Art)
- Günther Förg (Painting)
- Chup Friemert (Design Theory and Design History)
- Ludger Gerdes† (Painting)
- Siegfried Gohr (Art Research and Media Philosophy)
- Markus Grob (Architecture)
- Götz Großklaus (Media History)
- Boris Groys (Philosophy and Media Theory)
- Byung-Chul Han (Philosophy and Media Theory)
- Johan Frederik Hartle (Art Research and Media Philosophy)
- Thomas Heise (Media Art/Film)
- Candida Höfer (Media Art/Photography)
- Stephan von Huene† (Media Art)
- James Irvine† (Product Design)
- Anna Jermolaewa (New Media Art)
- Isaac Julien (Media Art)
- Ines Kaag and Désirée Heiss (Designduo Bless) (Product Design)
- Chris Kabel (Product Design)
- Dietmar Kamper† (Media Theory, Sociology and Philosophy)
- Dieter Kiessling (Media Art)
- Stephan Krass (Literary Art)
- Mischa Kuball (Media Art)
- Wilfried Kuehn (Exhibition Design und Curatorial Practice)
- Marie-Jo Lafontaine (Sculpture and Multimedia)
- James Langdon (Communication Design)
- Urs Lehni (Communication Design)
- Daniel Libeskind (Architecture)
- Armin Linke (Photography)
- Hansjerg Maier-Aichen† (Product Design)
- Florian Malzacher (Dramaturgy and Curatorial Practice)
- Christian Möller (Exhibition Design)
- Andreas Müller (Exhibition Design)
- Marcel Odenbach (Media Art)
- Dietrich Oertel (Architecture)
- Jai Young Park (Sculpture and Multimedia)
- Matteo Pasquinelli (Media Philosophy)
- Florian Pfeffer (Communication Design)
- Beatrix von Pilgrim (Scenography)
- Tania Prill (Communication Design)
- Răzvan Rădulescu (Film)
- Gunter Rambow (Visual Communication)
- Chris Rehberger (Communication Design)
- Manfred Reichert (Music)
- Edgar Reitz (Film)
- Lois Renner (Media Art/Photography)
- Peter Anselm Riedl (Art Research)
- Wolfgang Rihm (Composition)
- Sereina Rothenberger (Communication Design)
- Rolf Sachsse (Theories of Design)
- Michael Saup (Media Art/Digital Media)
- Michael Schirner (Communication Design)
- Heike Schuppelius (Scenography)
- Helmut Schuster† (Painting)
- Johannes Schütz (Scenography)
- Michael Simon (Scenography)
- Peter Sloterdijk (Philosophy)
- Lothar Spree (Media Art/Film)
- Rebecca Stephany (Communication Design)
- Thomas Struth (Media Art/Photography)
- João Tabarra (Media Art)
- Füsun Türetken (Product Design)
- Andrei Ujică (Film)
- Ulay (Uwe Laysiepen, Media Art)
- Wolfgang Ullrich (Art Research and Media Philosophy)
- Sven Voelker (Communication Design)
- Peter Voß (Media)
- Penelope Wehrli (Scenography)
- Hannes Wettstein† (Product Design)
- Beat Wyss (Art Research and Media Philosophy)
