= Thomas Heise =

German documentary filmmaker (1955–2024)

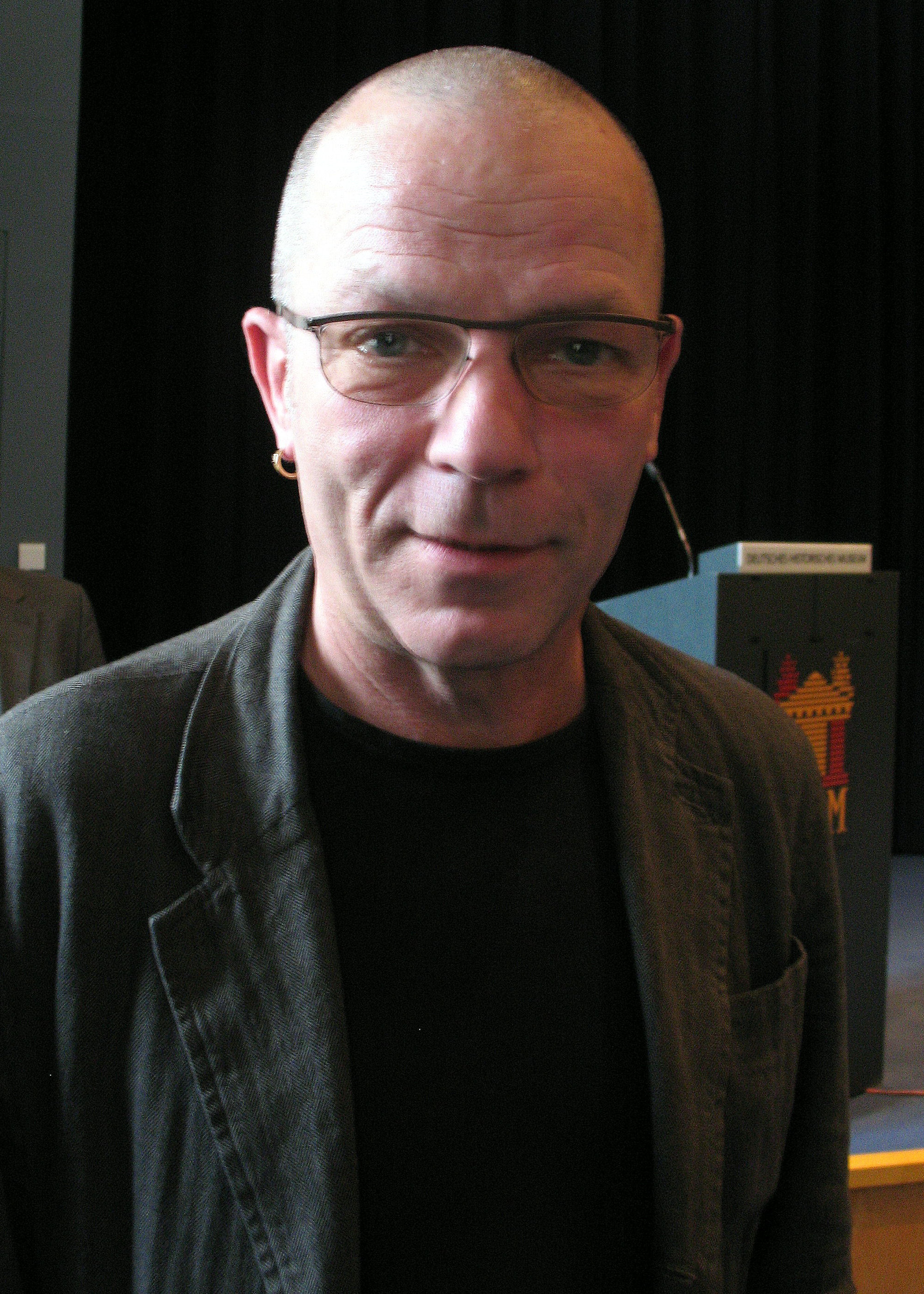
Heise in 2009

Thomas Heise (22 August 1955 – 29 May 2024) was a German documentary filmmaker.

== Life and work ==
Heise was born in East Berlin on 22 August 1955, the son of philosophy professor Wolfgang Heise. He was a printer's apprentice between 1971 and 1973. After a year in the National People's Army, Heise worked as a director's assistant between 1975 and 1978 in East Germany's DEFA Film Studios, finishing his final exams at night school. In 1978 he studied to be a director at the Konrad Wolf Hochschule für Film und Fernsehen. Following his first film, Why make a film about these people (Wozu denn über diese Leute einen Film?), about the culture of East Berlin before the wall came down, he broke off his studies, and began to work as a freelance writer and director. All of his early documentary films were banned or prohibited from screening by the East German government, as well as his radio works.

In December 1989, four weeks after the fall of the Berlin Wall, his radio feature Widerstand und Anpassung - Überlebensstrategie. Erinnerungen eines Mannes an das Lager Dachau (Resistance and Adaptation - Survival Strategies. Memories of a Man of the Dachau Camp) was finally broadcast on Berlin radio.

After the fall of the Wall, Heise finally became known, creating a number of disputed works, on topics affecting his country, such as the radical right-winged youth movement in Halle. Between 1993 and 1998 he directed a number of theater works, until in 2005 his film Mein Bruder. We Will Meet Again premiered at the Berlin International Film Festival in 2005. Heise continued to live and work in Berlin and as a film professor at the Karlsruhe University of Arts and Design from 2007.

In 2019, he created a documentary film entitled Heimat ist ein Raum aus Zeit (Heimat is a Space in Time), that won the main award from Nyon's reputable Visions du Réel. and won the main prize at the Muestra de Cine de Lanzarote.

Heise died on 29 May 2024, at the age of 68.

== Filmography ==
- 1980: Wozu denn über diese Leute einen Film? (Why Make a Film About These People?), 33 min
- 1981: Anka und… [never completed]
- 1982: Erfinder 82
- 1984: Das Haus / 1984 (state documentary of the former East German Republic)
- 1985: Volkspolizei 1985 (state documentary of the former East German Republic)
- 1987: Heiner Müller 1
- 1989: 4. November 1989
- 1989–1990: Imbiß-Spezial
- 1989–1990: Zuchthaus Brandenburg, Dezember 1989
- 1991: Eisenzeit
- 1992: STAU - Jetzt geht's los
- 1997: Barluschke
- 1999–2000: Neustadt (Stau - Der Stand der Dinge)
- 2000: Meine Kneipe
- 2002: Vaterland
- 2004–2005: Mein Bruder - We'll Meet Again
- 1999–2006: Im Glück (Neger)
- 2007: Kinder. Wie die Zeit vergeht
- 2009: Material
- 2011: Sonnensystem
- 2012: Die Lage
- 2012: Gegenwart
- 2014: Städtebewohner
- 2019: Heimat ist ein Raum aus Zeit
