= Huene =

Huene is a surname and given name. Notable people with the name include:

- Oswald von Hoyningen-Huene (1885-1963), German diplomat
- Friedrich von Huene (1875–1969), German paleontologist
- George Hoyningen-Huene (1900–1968), Russian-born fashion photographer
- Paul Hoyningen-Huene (born 1946), German philosopher
- Huenes Marcelo Lemos (born 1981), Brazilian football player
