= Kunstmuseum Bonn =

Art museum

Coordinates: 50°42′54.2″N 7°7′15.7″E

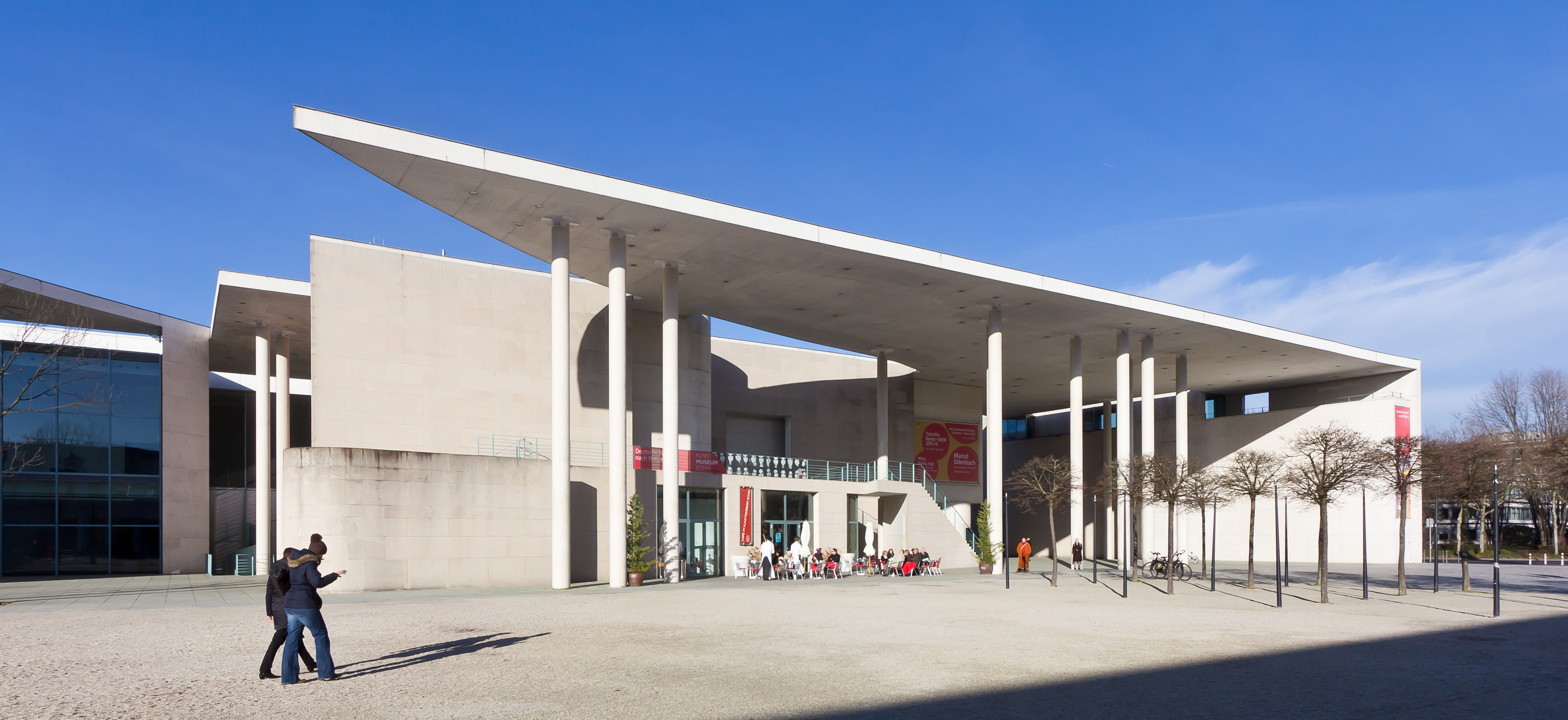
The Kunstmuseum Bonn

Kunstmuseum Bonn

The Kunstmuseum Bonn or Bonn Museum of Modern Art is an art museum in Bonn, Germany, founded in 1947. The Kunstmuseum exhibits both temporary exhibitions and its collection. Its collection is focused on Rhenish Expressionism and post-war German art. It is part of Bonn's "Museum Mile".

== Architecture ==
The present building, which opened in 1992, was created by the BJSS firm (Axel Schultes) and Jürgen Pleuser at a cost of about DM-100 million. It has three entrances, symbolising openness. The design of the staircase has been described as a "precise geometry, cut like jewellery. The conception of light brings the collection to life." The total exhibition area is around 4,000 square metres (43,000 sq ft).

== Rhenish Expressionism and art since 1945 ==
The collections of the Kunstmuseum focus on three strong points: Rhenish Expressionism (the largest collection in the world), post-war German art (particularly the 1960s to the early 1990s), and an international collection of post-war prints. German artists on display include Georg Baselitz, Joseph Beuys, Hanne Darboven, Anselm Kiefer, August Macke, Blinky Palermo and Wolf Vostell. Selected non-German artists are integrated into the display, such as Robert Delaunay in the Macke section, Richard Long in combination with Palermo, Lucio Fontana with Beuys, and Jannis Kounellis with Gerhard Merz.

August Macke in the Kunstmuseum
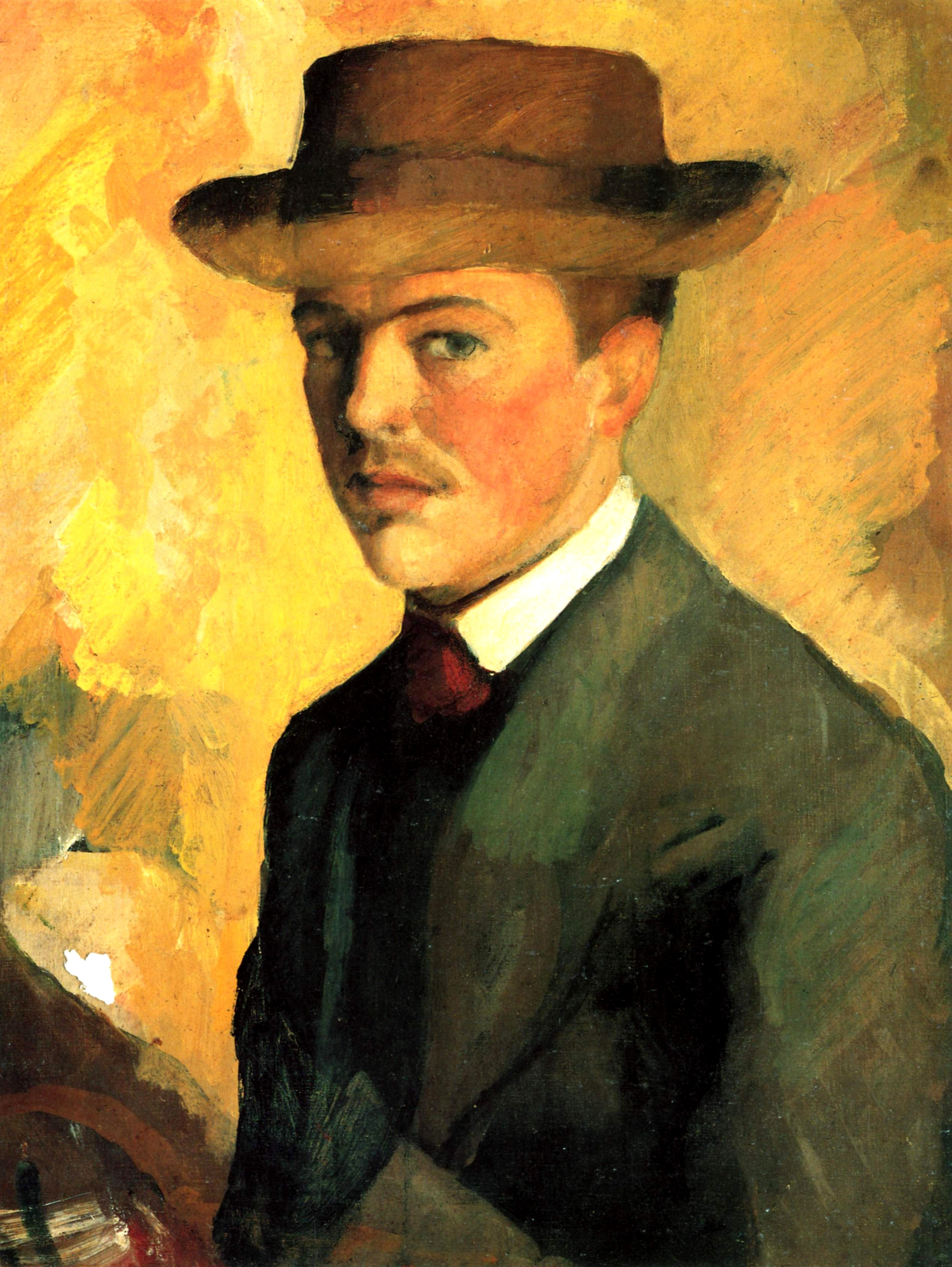
Self Portrait (1909)

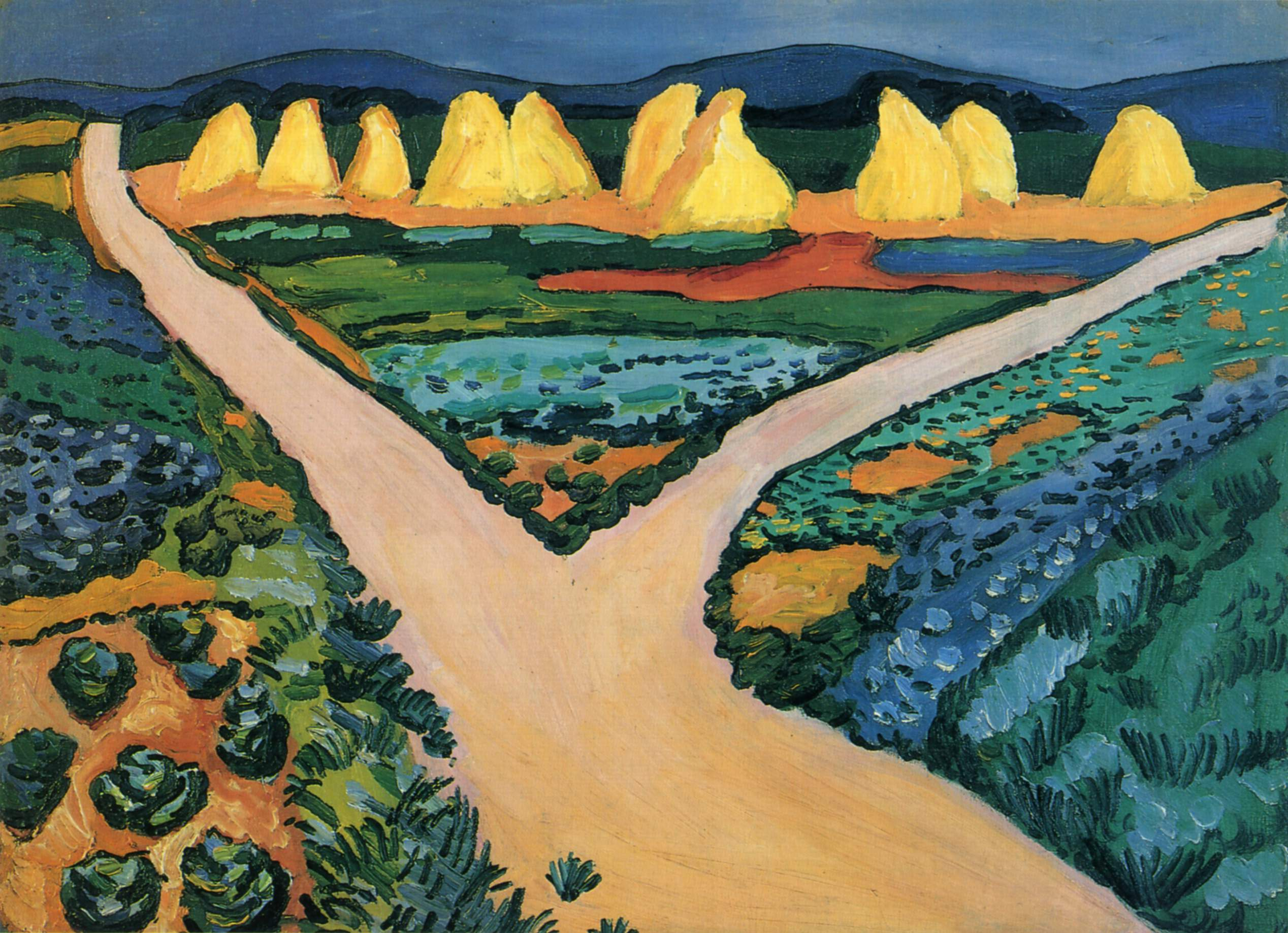
Vegetable Fields (1911)

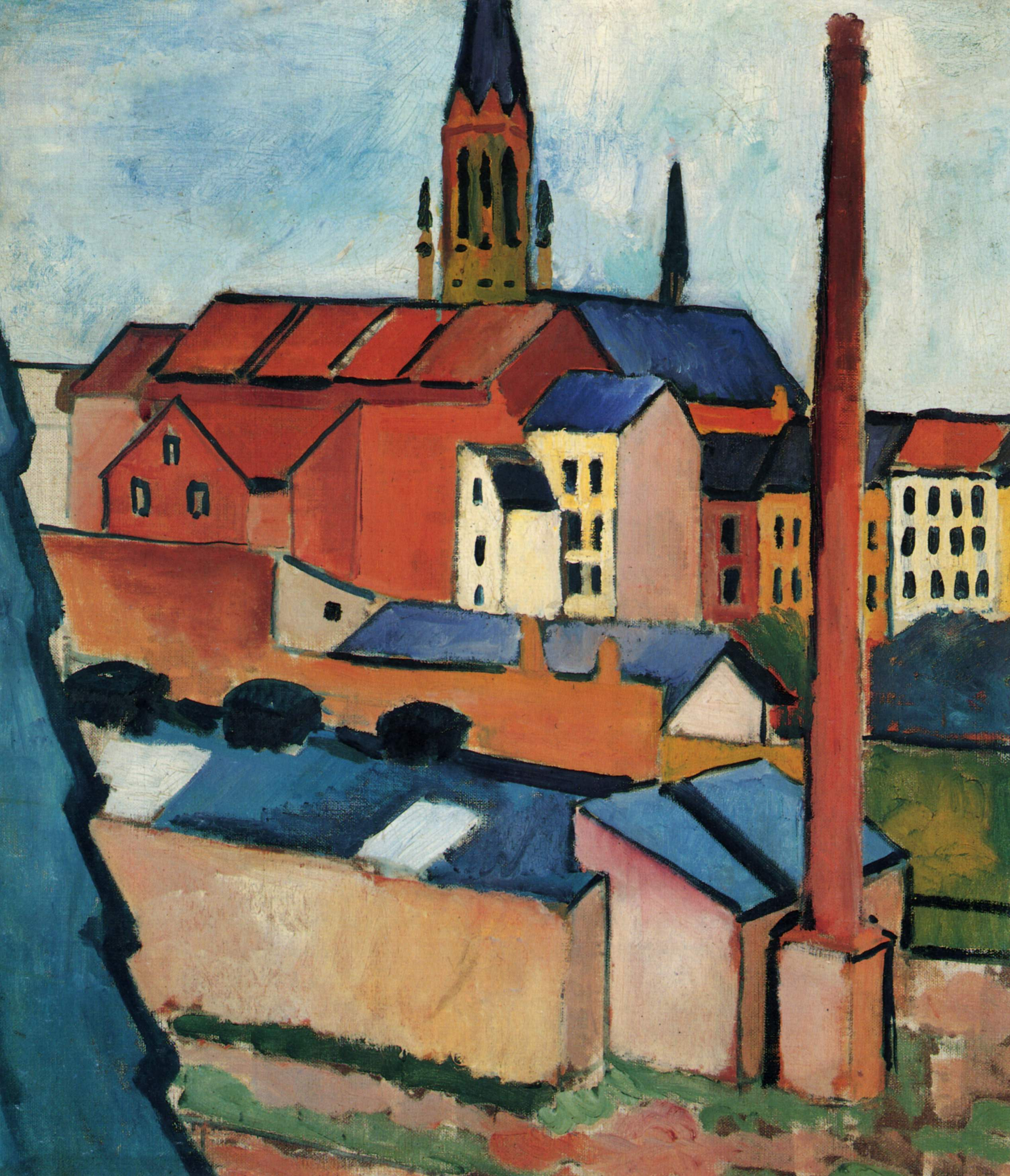
Houses with a Chimney (1911)

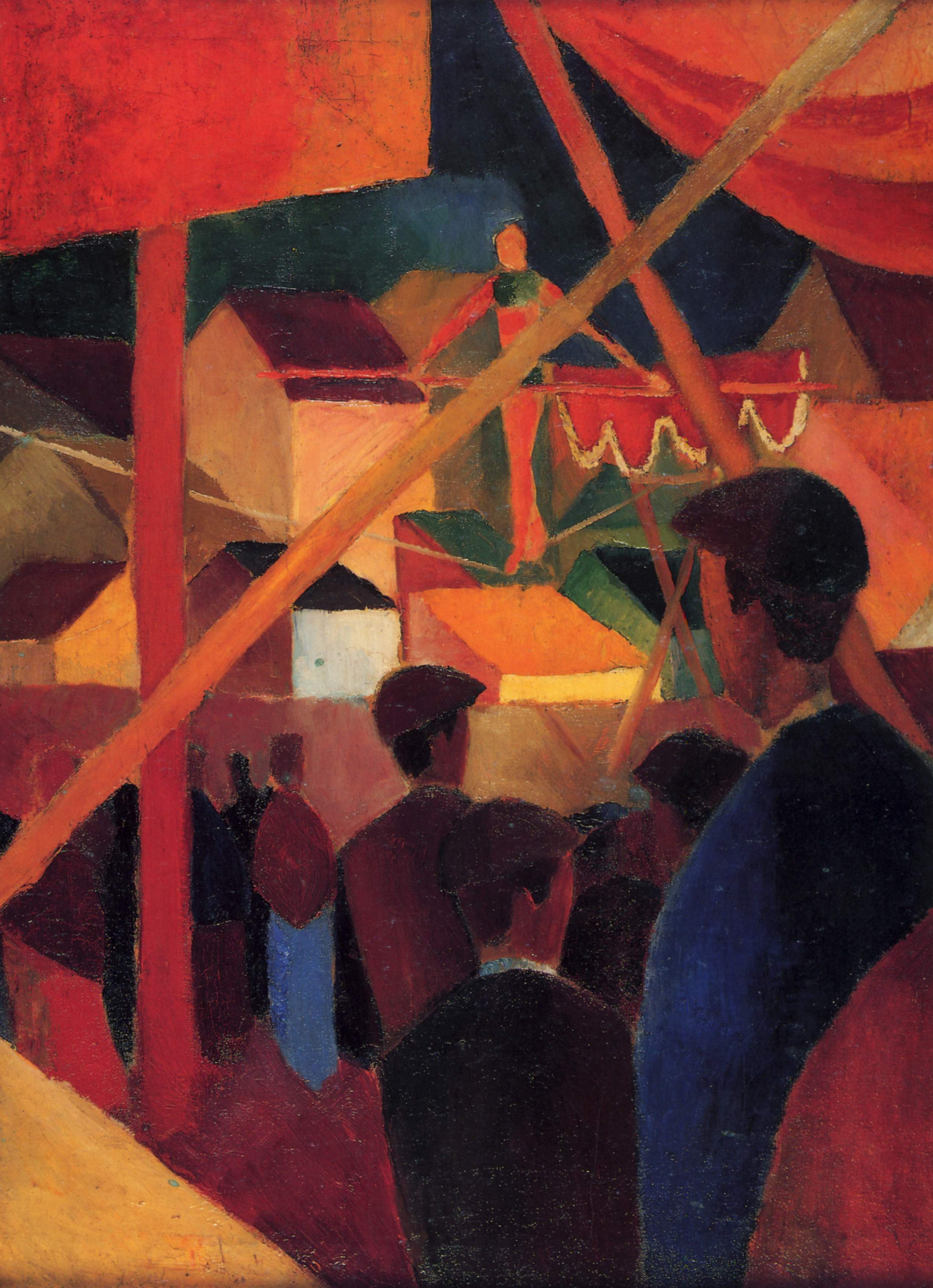
The Tightrope Walker (1914)

== Prints collection and video art ==
The prints collection, featuring around 5,000 works from the 20th and 21st centuries, includes so-called "multiples" by Beuys, illustrated books by Max Ernst, and printed graphics from the Bolliger Collection.

The Oppenheim Collection of video art includes works by Dennis Oppenheim, Joan Jonas, Klaus vom Bruch, Marcel Odenbach and Julian Rosefeldt.

The Videonale festival of contemporary video art, now based at the Kunstmuseum, has taken place biennially in Bonn since 1984.

== New direction ==
Interior view.

In 2005, the museum sold the former Grothe Collection to a married pair of collectors, the Ströhers, for €50m. This triggered a wide-ranging set of changes to the permanent exhibition, beginning in 2007, described by the incoming director Stephan Berg as a "certain rejuvenation". The works on the way out included Degenerate Art by Sigmar Polke and Assisi Cycle by Gotthard Graubner. Their place was taken by the work of younger artists. Some of the sculptures in front of the building were also acquired by the Ströhers.

== See also ==
- List of art museums
- List of museums in Germany
