= Klaus vom Bruch =

German media artist (born 1952)

Klaus vom Bruch (born 1952 in Cologne) is a German media artist and former university professor. He is regarded as a pioneer of German video art.

== Biography ==
Vom Bruch studied conceptual art at the California Institute of the Arts under John Baldessari from 1975 to 1976 and philosophy at the University of Cologne from 1976 to 1979.

In 1977, together with Ulrike Rosenbach and Marcel Odenbach, he participated in Alternativ Television (ATV), an artist-run television project that illegally broadcast a self-produced programme from a studio in Cologne to the surrounding neighbourhood.

His early video Das Schleyerband (1977–1978) consists largely of television footage recorded between September 1977 and June 1978 concerning the kidnapping and murder of industrialist Hanns Martin Schleyer by the Red Army Faction and the related events of the German Autumn.

From 1992 to 1998, vom Bruch was professor of media art at the Karlsruhe University of Arts and Design. From 1999 to 2018, he held a professorship in media art at the Academy of Fine Arts Munich. In 2000, he was a visiting professor at Columbia University in New York City.

== Awards and fellowships ==
- 1986: Dorothea von Stetten Art Award.
- 1987: Karl Schmidt-Rottluff Scholarship.

== Selected exhibitions ==
- 1984: Venice Biennale.
- 1984: Von hier aus, Düsseldorf.
- 1986: A Distanced View, New Museum, New York City.
- 1987: Documenta 8, Kassel.
