= Monika Baer =

German painter

Monika Baer (born 1964) is a German painter. She was born in Freiburg and studied at the Düsseldorf Art Academy.

In 2014 the Chicago Art Institute held a survey exhibition of her work. Her work is included in the collections of the Kunstmuseum Bonn, the Museum Brandhorst, the Barcelona Museum of Contemporary Art, the Williams College Museum of Art, and the Museum of Modern Art, New York.
