= Johannes Kahrs (artist) =

German artist

Johannes Kahrs (born 4 January 1965 in Bremen, West Germany) is an artist based in Berlin.

He studied at Hochschule der Künste in Berlin in 1994. Kahrs has shown work internationally in exhibitions including the 2002 Taipei Biennale, Manifesta 5 in San Sebastian, In/Site/Out at Apex in New York, the 1998 Berlin Biennale and Down’n Out at Zeno X Gallery in Antwerp. In 2008 he had a showing at the Luhring Augustine Gallery in New York City.

== Awards ==
- 2000: Dorothea von Stetten Art Award
