= Marcel Odenbach =

German video artist

- Born: 1953 (age 72–73); Cologne, West Germany
- Known for: Video art, Sculpture, Photography

Marcel Odenbach is a German video artist. In the 1970s, with Ulrike Rosenbach and Klaus vom Bruch, he formed the producer group ATV. Odenbach's works criticize the conditions of German society.

== Life and work ==
Odenbach was born in 1953 in Cologne, Germany, where he studied architecture, art history and semiotics between 1974–79. In the late 1970s, he started using video work, tapes, installations, performances and drawings to probe the cultural identity of his native Germany. His ambivalence to cultural history shows in works such as "Make a Fist in the Pocket", a German expression for hiding one's rage.

Odenbach was a professor of media art at the Karlsruhe University of Arts and Design between 1992–98. He now lives and works in Cologne and is the professor for film and video art at the Kunstakademie Düsseldorf since 2010.

== Works ==
- 1976-77: The Eternally Creative Hands or For All Art Historians (video, 4 minutes)
- 1977-78: To Stay in a Good Mood (video, 13 minutes)
- 1983: Die Distanz zwischen mir und meinen Verlusten
- 1984: I Do the Pain Test
- 1986: As If Memories Could Deceive Me
- 1986: In the Peripheral Vision of the Witness
- 1987: (Srecan Susret) Die gluckliche Begegnung (translation: The Happy Encounter, video, 6 minutes)
- 1994: Make a Fist in the Pocket
- 1994: Videoarbeit für einen Winterabend" (Videotape as contribution to "Der Klotz" portfolio of various artist)
- 1995: Vom Kommen und vom Gehen (Coming and Going)
- 1995: Standing is not falling down
- 1997-98: The Consumation of My Own Critique (video, DVD player, monitor, chair)
