= Anne Imhof =

German visual artist, choreographer and performance artist

- Born: 1978 (age 47–48); Giessen, Germany
- Education: Hochschule für Gestaltung Offenbach am Main; Städelschule
- Known for: Performance Art
- Awards: Preis der Nationalgalerie (2015); Golden Lion (2017)
- Website: anneimhof.com

Anne Imhof (born 1978 in Giessen, Germany) is a German visual artist, choreographer, and performance artist who lives and works between Frankfurt, Paris and Los Angeles. She is best known for her endurance art (also known as durational performance), although she cites painting and drawing as central to her practice.

In 2015, she was awarded the Preis der Nationalgalerie. In 2017, she received the Golden Lion for her work Faust at the German Pavilion at the Venice Biennale and was ranked No.1 on Monopol's Top 100 list.

She was a visiting professor at the Academy of Fine Arts Munich in 2015.

== Early life and education ==
Imhof was born in Giessen and grew up in Fulda. She was born to teacher father, Michael Imhof (born 1947), and dentist mother, Annette Imhof-Kramer.

Imhof attended the Catholic Marienschule in Fulda and the Marianum in Fulda, a private Catholic secondary school in the Marianist tradition, graduating in 1997. She studied a year abroad at Prior Park College in Bath, England. There, aged 14, she received private drawing lessons from a teacher, who introduced her to Michelangelo's drawing techniques. She was suspended from the school and sent home to Germany. She describes the environment as having been homophobic, saying she was accused of having the 'evil eye' and bewitching other girls.

Imhof played piano as a child, and later played in several bands.

Imhof described her first work as a performance she staged before studying (at around 20 years old) consisting of boxing matches held in a space in a club that lasted for exactly the duration of a punk band that was playing. She describes having been influenced by Andy Warhol, Giotto and Caravaggio at the time. However, she says it did not occur to her at the time that the piece was art.

From 2000 to 2003, Imhof studied Visual Communication at the Offenbach University of Art and Design (HfG), under Heiner Blum. There she met Nadine Fraczkowski, who she was also in the band 'Daughters from a Good Family' with, and has since worked with as a photographer. In 2003, Imhof presented her first video work, Private Butterflies, made in collaboration with Fraczkowski, at the Festival of Young Talents.

Imhof dropped out of art school as she "couldn't deal with the framework". In her twenties, she moved to Frankfurt, where she lived in a commune and made music. She worked as a bouncer for a club called Robert Johnson.

From 2008 to 2012, Imhof studied at the Städelschule in Frankfurt. She studied under Judith Hopf. She described her classes with Hopf, as well as Willem de Rooij and Isabelle Graw, as having been "mind-opening".

She won the graduate prize, awarded each year at the Museum of Modern Art in Frankfurt, for her final project.

From 2013 to 2014, Imhof lived in Paris on a studio scholarship from the Hessian Cultural Foundation at the Cité internationale des arts, the biggest artist residency in the world.

== Work ==
Imhof works across painting, video, music and performance. She says that all these media are created simultaneously and all influence each another. Whilst she often works in performance, she describes composing them as images. Her work usually starts in her drawing practice, describing it as creating studies for her work. She often also draws from performances, or images of her performances. She describes herself as foremost a painter.

Collaboration is a big part of her work. She has collaborated with artist Eliza Douglas since 2016, after having met in 2015 in the lobby of Texte zur Kunst's 25th anniversary gala. She has worked many times with people who used to dance for the Forsythe Company, including Josh Johnson and Frances Chiaverini.

Imhof often composes music for her performances, either alone or in collaboration with other artists, which has included Billy Bultheel, Eliza Douglas and Franziska Aigner (who also perform in her work).

Imhof describes being influenced by the early work of Genesis P-Orridge (DisCIPLINE), Matthew Barney's early work, Jean-Michel Basquiat, Tino Sehgal and Francis Bacon.

Animals also often feature in Imhof's performances. The first was in Aqua Leo, 1st of at least two (2013). The work included a cast of nine female performers (mainly trained dancers, all current or former employees of Robert-Johnson (a nightclub in Frankfurt), some Imhof's peers from the Städschule) alongside two mules (chosen because they are usually unable to reproduce and respond to fight-or-flight impulses). The work explored the rituals in a nightclub "designed to covertly indicate who is "in," for instance, and who is "out."" Imhof describes it as being "choreographed like a parade that only has internal movement and never actually gets going."

Aqua Leo, 1st of at least two was presented at Imhof's first solo exhibition at Portikus in Frankfurt, where she also presented performances School of the Seven Bells (SOTSB) and Ähjeii. SOTSB was named after the urban legend of a school for thieves and vagabonds, taking Robert Bresson's film Pickpocket (1959) as a starting point. In 2013, Imhof received a studio grant from the Hessian Cultural Foundation, where she continued to work on SOTSB. Ähjeii was a concert that Imhof conceived of as a prequel to the other two works.

Imhof was awarded the Preis there Nationalgalerie for her work Forever Rage (2015). This combined her elements of her works Deal (2015) (which had been previously shown at MoMA's PS1) and Rage (2014) (which had previously been shown at Galerie Deborah Schamoni). This was exhibited at the Hamburger Bahnhof in Berlin from September 2015 to January 2016, alongside the work of other prize winners. The work featured performers moving slowly in a dimly lit room, where black punching bags hung from the ceiling and buttermilk sloshed in concrete basins.

Some of Imhof's early works were shown at her 2024 exhibition Wish You Were Gay. This included work where Imhof was the performer. The posters for this exhibition were vandalised by being slashed with a knife whilst the exhibition ran.

=== Overture, Angst I, Angst II, Angst III, 2016 ===
Imhof describes this work as an opera in three acts. It was shown as exhibitions across four institutions and a live piece that travelled, showing different acts. The music for the work was written by Bill Bultheel.

Her work Angst I was premiered at Kunsthalle Basel in 2016. It featured performers interacting in choreographed movements within an installation of objects, paintings, branded consumer products and live falcons. Imhof included falcons as she was interested in the relationship between falcon and falconer, and also said that the falcon is "the best animal in seeing. Their eyes are the best." The work was curated by Elena Filipovic.

Angst II was shown at the historical hall of the Hamburger Bahnhof in Berlin in September 2016, commissioned as part of Imhof's Preis der Nationalgalerie in 2015. The space was fitted with a high wire on which a tightrope walker walked, and filled with fog. Music was played through the performer's individual mobile phones. The work was curated by Anna-Catharina Gebbers and Udo Kittelmann.

Angst III was shown as part of the 2016 Montreal Biennale on 19 October 2016, with the accompanying installation on display at the "Le Grand Balcon" at Musée d'art contemporain de Montréal until January 2017. The work was curated by Philippe Pirotte. It was a four-hour durational performance, that took place across two nights. In the piece, performers engaged in a range of actions including shaving each other's backs and stomachs, running into walls, falling off the stage, embracing and staring at the audience. The contained sleeping bags, packs of cigarettes, tubs of Vaseline and crates of Diet Pepsi. Evan Moffitt of Frieze described the performance as being "as dreary and aimless as the prospects for many of today's teenagers, facing a future of debt, fascism and climate change."

The music for the Angst series consisted of classical pieces – an aria, an overture, a march, a ballet, a waltz and a ballad. The music was played through the phones of the performers.

An overture to the Angst cycle was presented at Galerie Buchholz in Cologne in the Spring of 2016.

=== Faust, Venice Biennale, 2017 ===
In 2017, commissioned by Susanne Pfeffer, Imhof represented Germany at the Venice Biennale, transforming the pavilion with her performance piece, 'Faust' (which translates in English to 'fist'). Pfeffer said that she chose Imhof because her work "reflects on the changes that happen to our bodies in political and technological terms and represents a strong realism in a time of great transformation."

A glass floor was installed in the pavilion (93cm above the floor of the pavilion), with objects underneath including a leather mattress, cuffs, spoons, chains, bottles of liquids. Imhof stated that "When you take a glass and [lay it] horizontal, suddenly you know [that all is] not equal; there's an above and a below." There were also small platforms of the performers to stand on. In one room there was an industrial sink and hose alongside an electric guitar plugged into an amp and pedals. There were also large canvases screen-printed with repeated images of Eliza Douglas, one which shows a repeated image of Douglas, with a bare chest, with a name of a woman written on her to imply, Imhof said, "a female legacy...or heritage". There was also a figurative oil painting at the front of the pavilion of a nude with a black background.

The performers, wearing sportswear and dirty jeans, arranged themselves across the pavilion, both above and below the glass floor and on plinths. They engaged in a range of activities, including checking their mobile phones, masturbation (according to the catalogue essay), lighting small fires, staring at audience members, singing. Dobermann dogs walked inside a perimeter fence. The performers used iPhones to communicate to each other during the five-hour durational performances.

Imhof described the performance as an opera. It was accompanied by dissonant sounds emitted from a rudimentary sound system and the performers' smartphones. Musician Billy Bultheel worked on the sonic framework for the work. There was also music by Imhof, Elisa Douglas and Franziska Aigner.

Imhof was rewarded the prestigious Golden Lion award for "Best National Participation". This award is given to only one of the 85 exhibitions mounted in pavilions in the Giardini della Biennale and across Venice The jury called Faust "a powerful and disturbing installation that poses urgent questions about our time. It pushes the spectator to a state of anxiety." The work is widely considered to be Imhof's Meisterwerk. People queued for two hours to enter the pavilion. Frieze named the work No.12 of "The 25 Best Works of the 21st Century".

Whilst Imhof's work has been said to have a resemblance to the aesthetics of Nazi Germany, she has said that "That's bullshit. My background is very much an anti-fascist one" and that "I built a fence around the house that the Nazis built, and I let dogs piss on the staircase leading up to it.” However, R. H. Lossin, of e-flux, argues that "To professionally benefit from historical and ongoing political struggles without acknowledging them is a form of symbolic suppression and violence that is surprising even in the context of the supremely cynical universe of art-stardom." Rachel Wetzler, of Artforum, described Imhof as turning "the neoclassical German pavilion, a relic of the Nazi regime, into a kind of luxury display case for human bodies".

David Velasco of ArtForum described the work as "Faust is a work of supremely entitled cool. And yet there's heart here, too. It's a sprawling love letter—a delirious, epic tribute from Imhof to Douglas, and, I like to think, an haute fuck-you to the tyranny of great men."

=== SEX, 2019 ===
Imhof's performance was the first project by a solo female artist to occupy all the Tate Modern's tanks' spaces for the third edition of its annual BMW Tate Live exhibition from 22 to 31 March 2019. It was held as an installation and a live performance across six evenings. It included music, painting and sculpture. The work explored "opposites—femininity and masculinity, above and below, day and night—and explores the blurred boundaries in which they exist", in other words, the idea of transience.

The performers in the work included Eliza Douglas, dancer/choreographer Josh Johnson, dancer Mickey Mahar, Frances Chiaverini and Naomi Ruiz.

The music for the work, made in collaboration with Billy Bultheel, included both sparse sounds and fast electronic beats. Influences included walktz, punk and slam dancing. Eliza Douglas wrote all the music for voice. The music was produced by Ville Haimala.

Part two of SEX showed at the Art Institute of Chicago, and the third part at Castello di Rivoli Museo d'Arte Contemporanea in Turin.

=== Natures Mortes, 2021 ===
Originally scheduled for March 2020, Imhof's exhibition Natures Mortes (still lives) was held at Palais de Tokyo in 2021. It was curated by Emma Lavigne and Vittoria Matarrese. A Gesamtkunstwerk, the exhibition included paintings, music, drawings, installation and performance work. The space was divided by glass panels. In addition to Imhof's work, the exhibition included the work of 28 (or 32) other artists, including Géricault, Delacroix, Muybridge, Sigmar Polke, Joan Mitchell, Cy Twombly, David Hammons, Mike Kelley, and Sturtevant.

Amongst the 22 performers included Frances Chiaverini, Chantel Foo, Josh Johnson, Kelvin Kilonzo, Mickey Mahar, Karl Ruben Nöel (a.k.a. Rubix the Grizzly) and Tilman O'Donnell. Their actions included headbanging, dripping hot candle wax on each other, vaping, stage-diving, spin-kicking and loitering. Eliza Douglas performed on guitar and vocals. Igor Cavalera also blasted drum beats.

The exhibition included Untitled (Wave) (2021), a video work featuring Eliza Douglas, dressed only in trousers, whipping the waves of the sea.

The music for the piece was created in collaboration with Eliza Douglas and Ville Haimala. The work also included a text by Paul B. Preciado.

Caroline Busta, of Artforum, described the exhibition as being "a requiem for twentieth-century subculture—if not for the twentieth century, full stop." However, like many of Imhof's works, the exhibition was also critiqued for leaning on fashion and youth culture.

=== 2022–2023: YOUTH, AVATAR, AVATAR II, EMO ===
From 1 October 2022 to 29 January 2023, Imhof had an exhibition titled YOUTH at the Stedelijk Museum, Amsterdam. The exhibition was originally intended to be shown at the Garage Museum of Contemporary Art, Moscow. However, in response to the war in Ukraine, the programme was suspended.

Unlike Imhof's previous exhibitions,YOUTH did not feature live performances, but characters in the form of an avatar. The installation consisted of a labyrinth of lockers, water tanks, car tires and other objects. The work explored themes of constraining social structures, identity and body dysmorphia.

Imhof's installation AVATAR at Galerie Buchholz, New York also featured rows of industrial lockers, as well as concrete blocks, a three-panel painting of clouds, figurative drawings and a series of "Scratch Paintings" (aluminum panels coated in automobile paint with patterns scratched into them).

Imhof's installation AVATAR II at Sprüth Magers, London also featured rows of lockers alongside a scratch painting (Pacific (2022)), concrete blocks, posters of 1990s film stars, paintings (Jester and Cloud II (both 2022), two films (Avatar and NY Minute (both 2022)) and a series of drawings.

Imhof's first exhibition in America, EMO, held at Sprüth Magers, Los Angeles, included the work AI Winter (2021) (also shown at YOUTH). It features Eliza Douglas walking around in the Moscow snow. Imhof describes the piece as communicating "the feeling that is simultaneously torn, trapped and full of life at the same time." The exhibition also featured several drawings, one which depicts a dolphin, which Imhof described as the mascot for the show.

=== DOOM, 2025 ===
Imhof described Doom: House of Hope as Romeo and Juliet "but turned around so they start with their deaths, and then they go to their first kiss". It is about the vulnerability of youth. The work involved performers across disciplines including skateboarders and ballet dancers.

The work was premiered at the Park Avenue Armory in 2025. The space was "bathed in the eerie red light of a Jumbotron's ticking doomsday clock overhead". It also featured a flank of Cadillac Escalades (Cadillac sponsored the performance). The performance lasted three hours. It began with the audience pressed up against metal barriers.

Amongst the 50–60 performers included Eliza Douglas; actress Talia Ryder; Tahil Myth, Casper van Bülow; Levi Strasser; Sihana Shalaj; skaters Jourdynn Sherman and Joe Endo; Perla Haney-Jardine; Coco Gordon Moore; Jeremy "OPT" Perez; ballet dancers: Michael de la Nuez, Toon Lobach, Devon Teuscher, Tyler Maloney, Jacqueline Bologna, Connor Holloway, Desean Taber, and Daniil Simkin. Imhof describes having a "super potent, super talented, female-identifying cast". During the performance, Douglas draws on her bare torso with black marker, shoves playing cards into her mouth and howls like a woolf. Other performers tattooed each other; musician Arthur Tendeng (a.k.a. ATK44) rapped in French and German; others skateboarded. The performers communicated using WhatsApp during the performance. The performers quoted a range of sources including George Balanchine's Serenade (1934), Tino Sehgal's Kiss (2003), Heinrich Heine's Buch der Lieder (1827) and Rainer Werner Fassbinder's Querelle (1982). The third, and final, act of the piece features ballet dancers Devon Teuscher and Daniil Simkin.

The music for the piece was directed by Ville Haimala and featured industrial distortions of Bach and Mahler. Jacob Madden provided a piano accompaniment and Arthur Tending rapped. time Roth also helped with the sound.

The work was curated by Klaus Biesenbach.

For the work, Imhof collaborated with Nike, reinterpreting the "Total 90" jersey from the 2000s. Using football jerseys was an extension of the idea of rivalry amongst youth.

The piece received mixed reviews. Alex Greenberger, of ARTnews, described it as both "weird" and "glib, dull and hopeless", saying that: "The entire performance has the cooler-than-thou vibe of a Balenciaga runway show, replete with a range of rail-thin zillennials in baggy jeans; it has all the surface-level appeal of a Vogue slideshow devoted to one of those events, too." Similarly Hyperallergic called the show "a bad Balenciaga ad" and "tragically hollow beneath all the hype."

Jeanette Bisschops, of Frieze, describes that the work "delivers an unapologetic tribute to dance, music, theatre and literature – imbued, as always, with youthful defiance."

== Music ==
Music has always been central to Imhof's practice. Her first musical performance was with Oliver Augst at basis in Frankfurt. She also performed with her band 'Beautiful Balance' since 2012.

In 2019, Imhof released an album of her performance Faust. Billy Bultheel condensed his compositions for the original performance into the album in collaboration with Imhof, Eliza Douglas and Franziska Aigner. It was released by the Berlin label PAN and mixed by Ville Haimala. The album artwork was created by Nadine Fraczowski.

In 2025, Imhof released her album WYWG (Wish You Were Gay). This includes songs mostly written by Imhof in the early noughties.

== Fashion collaborations ==
Imhof has collaborated with several fashion brands and designers. In 2020, she designed a show for Burberry. In 2025, she put on a "battle of the bands" performance sponsored by Nike. This included a special-edition football shirt with "Imhof" on the back. In 2025, she and her partner Devon Teuscher were photographed as part of a campaign for Valentino.

Imhof's work is sometimes also described as a "Balenciaga ad", and The Guardian has said she has served "as a semi-official muse for Balenciaga's former creative director Demna" for several years.

She has received criticism for her involvement with so many brands and for not being more political. In response, Imhof has said that "My interest is not in claiming moral purity, but in remaining aware of the conditions of production – who is involved, how labour is treated, and what choices I make as an artist. Collaborating with fashion or popular culture doesn't surrender autonomy.”

== Personal life ==
Aged 20, Imhof had a daughter.

In 2020, Imhof was among the first signatories of the Zero Covid campaign.

Imhof was previously in a relationship and was engaged to artist and collaborator Eliza Douglas, who is often cited as Imhof's muse. Describing their relationship, Imhof said she had "Never felt this kind of inspiration being constantly in exchange and aligned with another person."

Imhof is currently in a relationship with ballerina Devon Teuscher.

== Exhibitions and performances ==
=== Solo Shows ===
Year	Title	Institution	Location	Ref.
2011	1st of at least four	Künstler*innenhaus Mousonturm	Frankfurt	
2012	Audition Opelvillen		Rüsselsheim	
2013	SOTSB Njjy		New Jersey, Basel	
2013	Parade	Portikus	Frankfurt	
2014	Rage III, SOTSB, Foster Variation	Carré d'Art	Nîmes	
2014	Rage II	Liste Performance Program	Basel	
2014	Anne Imhof (incl. Rage I)	Deborah Schamoni	Munich	
2015	DEAL	MoMA PS1	New York	
2016	Anne Imhof	Galerie Buchholz	Köln	
2016	Angst	Kunsthalle Basel	Basel	
2016	Angst II	Hamburger Bahnhof	Berlin	
2016	Angst III	Biennale de Montréal, Musée d'art contemporain de Montréal	Montréal	
2016	Overture	Galerie Buchholz	Cologne	
2017	Faust	German Pavilion, 57th Venice Biennale	Venice	
2019	Imagine	Galerie Buchholz	Berlin	
2019	Sex	Tate Modern	London	
2019	Sex	Art Institute Chicago	Chicago	
2020	Sex	Castello di Rivoli Museo d'Arte Contemporanea	Turin	
2020	ONE	CIRCA, Piccadilly Circus	London	
2021	Natures Mortes	Palais de Tokyo	Paris	
2021	Sex, X-room	National Gallery of Denmark (SMK)	Copenhagen	
2022	YOUTH	Stedelijk Museum	Amsterdam	
2022	AVATAR	Galerie Buchholz	New York	
2022	Avatar II	Sprüth Magers	London	
2023	EMO	Sprüth Magers	Los Angeles	
2024	Wish You Were Gay	Kunsthaus Bregenz	Bregenz	
2025	Doom: House of Hope	Park Avenue Armory	New York	
2025	Cold Hope	Galerie Buchholz	Berlin	
2025–2026	Fun ist ein Stahlbad (Fun is a Steel Bath)	Serralves Museum of Contemporary Art	Porto	

=== Group Shows ===
Year	Title	Institution	Location	Curator	Other artists	Ref.
2011	Andrei Koschmieder puts	Real Fine Arts	New York			
2011	Birth of the Worm	The Leland Hotel Ballroom	Detroit			
2011	Open Studios	Villa Romana	Florence			
2012	Beautiful Balance	CAPC Musée d'Art Contemporarin	Bordeaux			
2012	Beautiful Balance	Neue Alte Brücke	Frankfurt			
2012	Beautiful Balance	Kunsthalle Bern	Bern			
2012	Zauderberg: Graduates of the Städelschule 2012	Museum für Moderne Kunst (MMK)	Frankfurt			
2013	Soapy	Neue alte Brücke	Frankfurt			
2013	Gemini	Galerie Francesca Pia	Zurich	Jeanne Graff		
2013	Freak out	Greene Naftali Gallery	New York			
2013	Mike / Restlessness in the Barn	Nassauischer Kunstverein	Wiesbaden	Oona von Maydell	Cosima von Bonin, Jana Euler, Lucie Stahl	
2013	Coded Conduct	Pilar Corrias	London			
2014	Present Future	Artissima	Torino	Jamie Stevens		
2014	Boom she Boom: Works of the collection	Museum für Moderne Kunst (MMK)	Frankfurt			
2014	Tes Yeux	186f Kepler	Paris	Anne Dressen		
2014	The Mechanical Garden	CGP London	London	Naomi Pearce		
2014	Trust	Fluxia Gallery	Milan	Michele D'Aurizio		
2014	Liste Performance Program		Basel	Fabian Schöneich		
2014	Abandon the Parents	SMK Statens Museum for Kunst, National Gallery of Denmark	Copenhagen			
2014	Die Marmory Show	Deborah Schamoni	Munich	Gürsoy Doğtaş and Deborah Schamoni	Aaron Angell, Tue Greenfort, Pierre Huyghe, Dani Jakob, Josephine Pryde, Yorgos Sapountzis, Hannah Weinberger	
2014	Pleasure Principles	Lafayette Foundation	Paris			
2015	Preis der Nationalgalerie	Hamburger Bahnhof	Berlin			
2015	Works on Paper	William Arnold	Brooklyn			
2015	IN MY ABSENCE	Galerie Jocelyn Wolff	Paris	Dorothea Jendrike		
2015	Our Lacustrine Cities	Chapter NY	New York	Laura Mc Lean Ferris		
2015	Angelic Sisters	Kepler 186	Milan		John Armleder, Genesis P.Orridge, Stefan Tcherepnin	
2015	Do Disturb	Palais de Tokyo	Paris			
2015	Nouveau Festival	Centre Pompidou	Paris	Marlie Mul		
2015	Life Gallery	Vilma Gold	London			
2015	New Frankfurt Internationals	Frankfurter Kunstverein	Frankfurt			
2015	New Frankfurt Internationals	Nassauischer Kunstverein	Wiesbaden			
2017	Eliza Douglas Anne Imhof	Galerie Buchholz	New York		Eliza Douglas	
2019	Performing Society: The Violence of Gender	Tai Kwun Contemporary	Hong Kong	Susanne Pfeffer	Mariana Simnett, Dong Jinling, Raphaela Vogel, Jana Euler	
2023	Jester	Art Basel	Basel			
2023	Critical Melancholia	Galerie Buchholz	New York		With: Lutz Bacher, Isa Genzken, Michael Krebber, Henrik Olesen, Josephine Pryde	

== Collections ==
- From the Lion's Paw (2012), Museum für Moderne Kunst, Frankfurt, Inv. No. 2013/71
- The inner circle became the outer circle (2012), Museum für Moderne Kunst, Frankfurt, Inv. No. 2013/73
- Room IV (2021), Hamburger Bahnhof, Museum in Motion – A Collection for the 21st Century

== Sound recordings ==
Year	Title	Format	Distributor	Ref.
2016	Brand New Gods	Vinyl, 12"	Galerie Buchholz, Cologne	
2019	Faust			
2025	WYWG		PAN	

== Awards ==
- 2012: Graduate Award of the Städelschule Portikus e. V.
- 2012: ZAC (zonta art contemporary)
- 2013: Studio Scholarship in Paris from Hessische Kulturstiftung (Hessian Cultural Foundation)
- 2017: Absolut Art Award, Stockholm
- 2017: Golden Lion for best national contribution at the Biennale di Venezia
- 2015: Preis der Nationalgalerie
- 2020: BEN Award "Most Important Artist" in the category Gesamtkunstwerk at the B3 Biennial of the Moving Image
- 2022: Binding-Kulturpreis
- 2022: Goethe Plaque of the City of Frankfurt
