= Eliza Douglas =

American painter

- Born: 1984 (age 41–42); New York City
- Education: Bard College; Städelschule
- Known for: Painting; Music; Modeling

Eliza Douglas (born 1984) is an American contemporary artist known primarily for their paintings and performances, though also works with sculpture and photography. Since the 2000s, she has worked with music with different artists.

Her meta-paintings are often inspired by art, fashion, pop and underground culture. Aside from being an artist, Douglas has also worked as a model for a variety of brands like Balenciaga, Helmut Lang and Vetements.

== Early life and education ==
Douglas grew up in the West Village in New York City. Her parents are a lawyer and an elementary school teacher.

She is the great-granddaughter of Dorothy Wolff Douglas, who was a professor of economics and departmental chair at Smith College. Her pieces, Shadow and Light and Blood and Bones are in Dorothy's memory. They were commissioned by and first exhibited at the Jewish Museum, New York.

In 2007, Douglas received a BA in Film Studies from Bard College. Half-way through her second year, she was kicked out of the programme for missing classes. It took her five years in total to finish her undergraduate course. She tried to return to college to study social work, but abandoned that.

From 2015 to 2017, she attended the Städelschule in Frankfurt, where studied with Willem de Rooij. In her first year, she met Anne Imhof at the lobby of Texte zur Kunst’s 25th anniversary gala, and they quickly started a relationship. In 2016, she showed her work for the first time at the Städelschule's "Rundgang". Her work soon gained attention and she became represented by two galleries internationally.

After graduating, Douglas returned to New York, splitting her time between the US and Frankfurt.

== Career ==
=== Painting ===
Douglas is a painter. Her works are conceptually driven and combine realism, figuration, abstraction, and humour. She has an unconventional approach to painting, bridging abstract painting with technical skill and conceptuality, often questioning authorship and authenticity. Her work is often created in collaboration with other artists. For example, she has previously employed other artists to do more detailed elements of her work. She has also ordered entire compositions of Dafen, China.

She cites Monika Baer and Maria Lassnig as inspirations. Douglas is represented by Air de Paris.

=== Music and performance ===
An important aspect in Douglas’s work is collaboration, among many they have collaborated with Anne Imhof, Devendra Banhart, ANOHNI, Matteah Baim, Hercules and Love Affair and Puppies Puppies.

Douglas toured with ANHONI for their 2006 European tour ‘TURNING’ Where Eliza appeared as one of the 13 New York City-based women who were featured in the stage show. She also appeared in the subsequent documentary ‘Turning: A Film by Charles Atlas and Antony’ (2012) by Charles Atla. Douglas starred in the music video for ANHONI's 2017 song PARADISE from the EP PARADISE.

Douglas is a frequent collaborator with German artist Anne Imhof. She has been a constant performer in Imhof’s work since 2016, first performing in Angst I at Kunsthalle Basel in 2016 and Angst II at the Hamburger Bahnhof also in 2016. Douglas also co-created the music and performed in Sex, Imhof's 2019 piece for the Tate Modern and Faust, at the 57th Venice Biennale in 2017, which won the Golden Lion. The Music for Sex was released as a collaborative album in 2021, with shared credit between Anne Imhof, Eliza Douglas and Billy Bultheel. For the 2021 Carte Blanche at Palais de Tokyo, Douglas wrote and produced the music, did the art direction, casting, styling and performed for Imhof's artwork titled Nature Mortes.

Douglas wrote the music and performed the soundtrack for the Burberry 2021 Spring Summer collection presentation.

=== Modeling ===
Eliza Douglas modeled for the first time when she was 12 years old for Helmut Lang.

In 2016, she was recommended to Lotta Volkova, one of the main casting directors for Demna Gvasalia’s first show with Balenciaga. Douglas’s natural walk interested the creative director and they have modeled for Balenciaga, opening or closing every show since.

For Balenciaga’s Spring/Summer 2022 show Clones, a CGI production attended by a small crowd, all 44 looks were modeled by Douglas via deepfake or other models with Douglas Photogrammetry-captured and CG-scanned face digitally grafted on.

== Personal life ==
Douglas was previously in a relationship and was engaged to artist and collaborator Anne Imhof, and Douglas is often cited as Imhof's muse.

== Exhibitions ==
Solo & Duo
Year	Title	Institution	Location	Ref.
2016	I Am All Soul	Air de Paris	Paris	
2016	Music, Jo Anne	Stadelschule	Frankfurt	
2017	Old Tissues Filled with Tears	Schinkel Pavillion	Berlin	
2017	My Gleaming Soul, 6 /12 Weeks	Museum Folkwang	Essen	
2017	My Gleaming Soul / I am a Fireball	Nassauischer Kunstverein	Wiesbaden	
2017	Eliza Douglas Anne Imhof	Galerie Buchholz	New York	
2017		Overduin & Co.	Los Angeles	
2018	Eliza Douglas	The Jewish Museum	New York	
2018	Old Tissues Filled with Tears	Schinkel Pavillon	Berlin	
2019	Josh Smith	Overduin & Co.	Los Angeles	
2020	Lord of the Fucking Wasteland	Air de Paris	Paris	
2021	Notre Mort	Neue Alte Brücke	Frankfurt	
2021		Overduin & Co.	Los Angeles	
2022	Whitney Biennal	VI VII	Oslo	
2023	Everything Dies	Museum Kunstpalast	Düsseldorf	
2023	PAROLE (Eliza Douglas and Lily van der Stokker	Air de Paris	Paris	

Selected group shows
Year	Title	Institution	Location	Ref.
2016	Summer show	Air de Paris, 11 Columbia	Monaco	
2016	Being There cur.	Matt Williams, Vilma Gold	London	
2017	Transitions	Rod Bianco gallery	Oslo	
2017	Cul-de-sac	Antenna Space	Shanghai	
2017	Therianthropy	Laura Bartlett Gallery	London	
2017	Monday is a Day Between Sunday and Tuesday	Tanya Leighton Gallery	Berlin	
2018		James Fuentes	New York	
2018	Hey woman!	Presenza	London	
2018	Nothing Will Be As Before	Tanya Leighton	Berlin	
2018	The Seam, the Fault, the Flaw	Greenspon	New York	
2018	The Vitalist Economy of Painting	Galerie Neu	Berlin	
2018	Nightfall	Mendes Wood DM	Bruxelles	
2019	Mademoiselle	CRAC Sète	Sète	
2019	Sex	Tate Modern	London	
2019	Sex	The Art Institute Chicago	Chicago	
2019	Nightfall	Mendes Wood DM	Bruxelles	
2019	Eliza Douglas / Puppies Puppies (Jade Kuriki Olivo)	Galerie Francesca Pia	Zürich	
2019	More	Air de Paris	Romainville	
2020	Sex	Castello di Rivoli Museo d'Arte Contemporanea	Turin	
2020	Milléniales. Peintures 2000-2020	Méca - FRAC Nouvelle-Aquitaine	Bordeaux	
2020	My C art ography. The Erling Kagge Collection	Santander Art gallery	Boadilla del Monte	
2020	Ups and Downs of a Flipped Planet	Galerie Huber Winter	Vienna	
2020	Ma cartographie: la collection Erling Kagge	Fondation Vincent Van Gogh	Arles	
2020	Studio Berlin	Berghain	Berlin	
2020	<<Fuck You Be Nice>>	Air de Paris	Romainville	
2020	Green Go Home	Hua International Berlin Show Room	Berlin	
2021	Natures Mortes, Anne Imhof	Palais de Tokyo	Paris	
2021	Lust for Life	Edward Ressle	Shanghai	
2022	YOUTH, Anne Imhof	Stedelijk Museum	Amsterdam	
2022	Barbe à Papa	CAPC	Bordeaux	
2023	Death and the Devil	Kunstpalast	Düsseldorf	
2023	Canned Heat	Contemporary Fine Arts	Berlin	
2024	J’ai pleuré à la fin d’un manga	École Municipale des Beaux-Arts, Galerie Édouard Manet	Gennevilliers	

== Performances ==
Year	Title	Venue	Location	Ref.
2004 - 2006	Devendra Banhart (Band)		Toured USA, Europe, Japan	
2006	Antony and the Johnsons, “Turning”		European Tour	
2007	Matteah Baim (Band)	MoMA PS1	USA	
2007	Matteah Baim (Band)		European Tour	
2016	Angst II	Hamburger Bahnhof	Berlin	
2016	Angst	Kunsthalle Basel	Basel	
2017	Anne Imhof: Faust (Co-curator and performer)	German Pavilion, Venice Biennale	Venice	
2019	Anne Imhof: Sex, BMW Tate Live (Performer)	Tate Modern	London	
2019	ANOHNI: SHE WHO SAW BEAUTIFUL THINGS (Performer)	The Kitchen	New York	
2020	Vape Music | A Concert by Anne Imhof and Eliza Douglas	Musée d’Art Moderne de Paris	Paris	
