= Ellen Gronemeyer =

German painter (born 1979)

Ellen Gronemeyer (born 1979 in Fulda) is a German contemporary painter and has held a junior professorship at the Kunstakademie Düsseldorf, the academy of fine arts of Germany's federal state of North Rhine Westphalia, since 2017.

== Life ==
Gronemeyer grew up in Fritzlar, a small German town in northern Hesse with a storied history. After finishing her secondary education in 1998 she took up studies of Free Art at the Hochschule für bildende Künste Hamburg (HFBK), the University of Fine Arts of Hamburg. Amongst her mentors there were Stephan Dillemuth, Werner Büttner, Bogomir Ecker, Sabeth Buchmann and Daniel Richter. She graduated in 2005 with a diploma.

From 2006 until 2009, Gronemeyer held a teaching position at the Chelsea College of Arts and Design in London.

In 2014, Gronemeyer had her first solo exhibition in a museum at the Ludwig Forum for International Art in Aachen.

In 2017, Gronemeyer was appointed to a junior professorship for painting at the Kunstakademie Düsseldorf.

Since 2009, she has been living in Berlin.

== Awards ==
- 2003: scholarship of the Studienstiftung des deutschen Volkes
- 2009: Zeitsicht-art award, Augsburg (juror: Daniel Richter)

== Solo exhibitions (selection) ==
- 2004: Erste Strophe Erste Zeile, Pudelclub/Nomadenoase, Hamburg
- 2005: Ellen Gronemeyer, Gallery Karin Günther, Hamburg
- 2006: Ich häng Dir Deine Blässe um, greengrassi, London
- 2007: Ellen Gronemeyer, (with Michael Hakimi) Andrew Kreps, New York
- 2009: Drop Me on the Corner, greengrassi, London
- 2010: Zeitsichtpreis 2009, Schaetzlerpalais, Augsburg
- 2011: CDU/CSU, Galerie Karin Günther, Hamburg
- 2012: Affentheater, Kimmerich, New York
- 2012: I have a difficult childhood, greengrassi, London
- 2014: Ellen Gronemeyer. Watchever, Ludwig Forum für Internationale Kunst, Aachen (mit Katalog)
- 2015: Keine Minute Ruhe, greengrassi, London
- 2015: Raw and Delirious, Kunsthalle Bern
- 2017: Bochum, Kimmerich, Berlin
- 2018: frozen, Anton Kern Gallery, New York
- 2021: Tausendmal Du, Anton Kern Gallery, New York

== Works (Selection) ==
- Exclamation-marc, 2015, oil on canvass, 160 × 120 cm, San Francisco Museum of Modern Art
