= Robert Goute =

French drummer

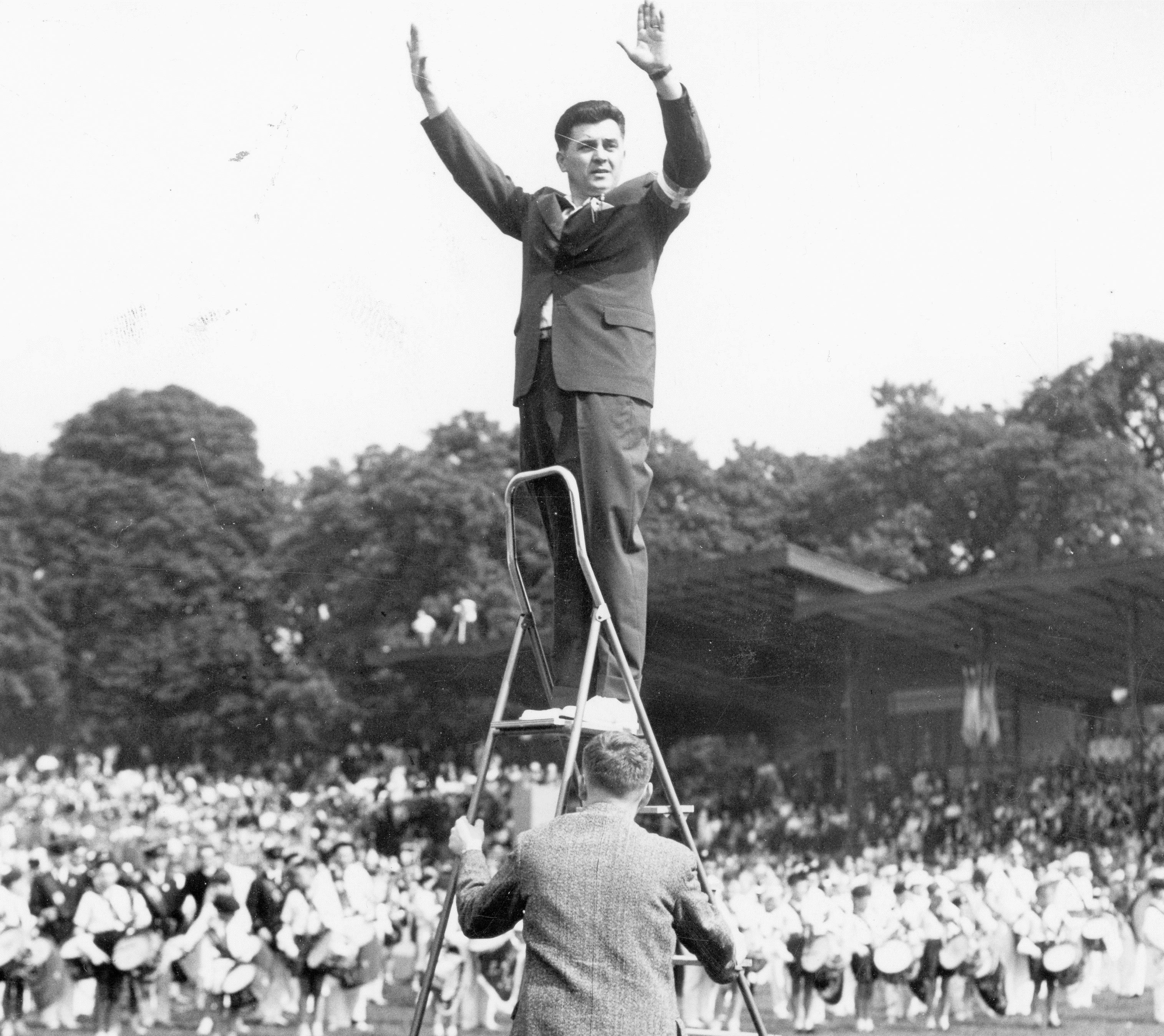
- Goute directing a festival circa 1960
- Born: 19 December 1919; Saint-Denis, Seine-Saint-Denis
- Died: 15 December 2014 (aged 94) l’Isle-Adam
- Occupation: Drum major in the Air de Paris

Robert Goute (19 December 1919 – 15 December 2014) was a drum major in the Air de Paris.

Goute was the head of the Music Commission of the Sports and Cultural Federation of France until 1979, a founding member of the Confédération française des batteries-fanfarez (en: French Confederation of Drum Bands), established in 1980, and president of the Fédération Internationale de l'école française du tambour (en: International Federation of the French Drum School), established in 1990. He is known as one of the leading figures in the revival of the modern drum band.

== Life and career ==
Robert Goute was born in Saint-Denis on December 19, 1919, to a family of drummers. His father was a masonry entrepreneur, volunteer firefighter, and amateur musician. He introduced Robert to drums from the age of five in the ranks of the local music society he directed, Les Bleuets de Domont. He quickly demonstrated exceptional skills, and in 1933 he was noticed by Gabriel Defrance, who was a drum major of the music of the Republican Guard. He offered him private lessons, and by the age of 14, Goute traveled to Paris every week to attend his lessons — a round-trip journey of 50 km (31 mi).

Robert Goute married and was a father of four children (2 girls and 2 boys). He died on December 15, 2014, at the Isle-Adam Hospital (Val-d'Oise).

=== French Air Force (1938–1970) ===
Logo of the French Air Force

Goute was admitted at the age of 18 to the drum competition of the French Air Force, and he joined the musical formation on February 28, 1938. Maurice Bonnard, the drum major, quickly entrusted him to the drum desk. In 1940, the band was forced to move to the free zone in Toulouse, where it was transformed into a men's choir to participate in the weekly radio concerts given by the Music de l'air. Back in Paris after the Liberation of France, Robert Goute lead his team of thirteen instrumentalists to a unique technical and musical level, and in 1953, he replaced Maurice Bonnard as a drum major.

Recruitment was improved and, in 1956, there were 27 awards from the Conservatoire de Paris within the drum band. Like the Patrouille de France, with which it is often associated, its fanfare band contributed to the reputation of high virtuosity of the air force. In 1963, during the rehearsals of the ballet Notre-Dame de Paris by Maurice Jarre and Pierre Petit, he was called upon to help the percussion class of the Conservatoire because of difficulty ensuring the part. Robert Goute left active service on March 1, 1970, after more than 31 years of active service to the Air Force.

=== Sports and Cultural Federation of France (1949–1979) ===
After the death of Gabriel Defrance in 1952 and a vacancy for three years, Goute accepted the chairmanship of the federal music commission of the Sports Federation de France (FSF) of which he had been a member since 1949. He directed movements towards more contemporary styles and regularly published technical and educational articles in Les Jeunes, introducing spatial evolutions in the presentation of drum bands. However, his efforts to structure regional and federal orchestras failed.

=== French Confederation of Drum Bands (1980–2014) ===
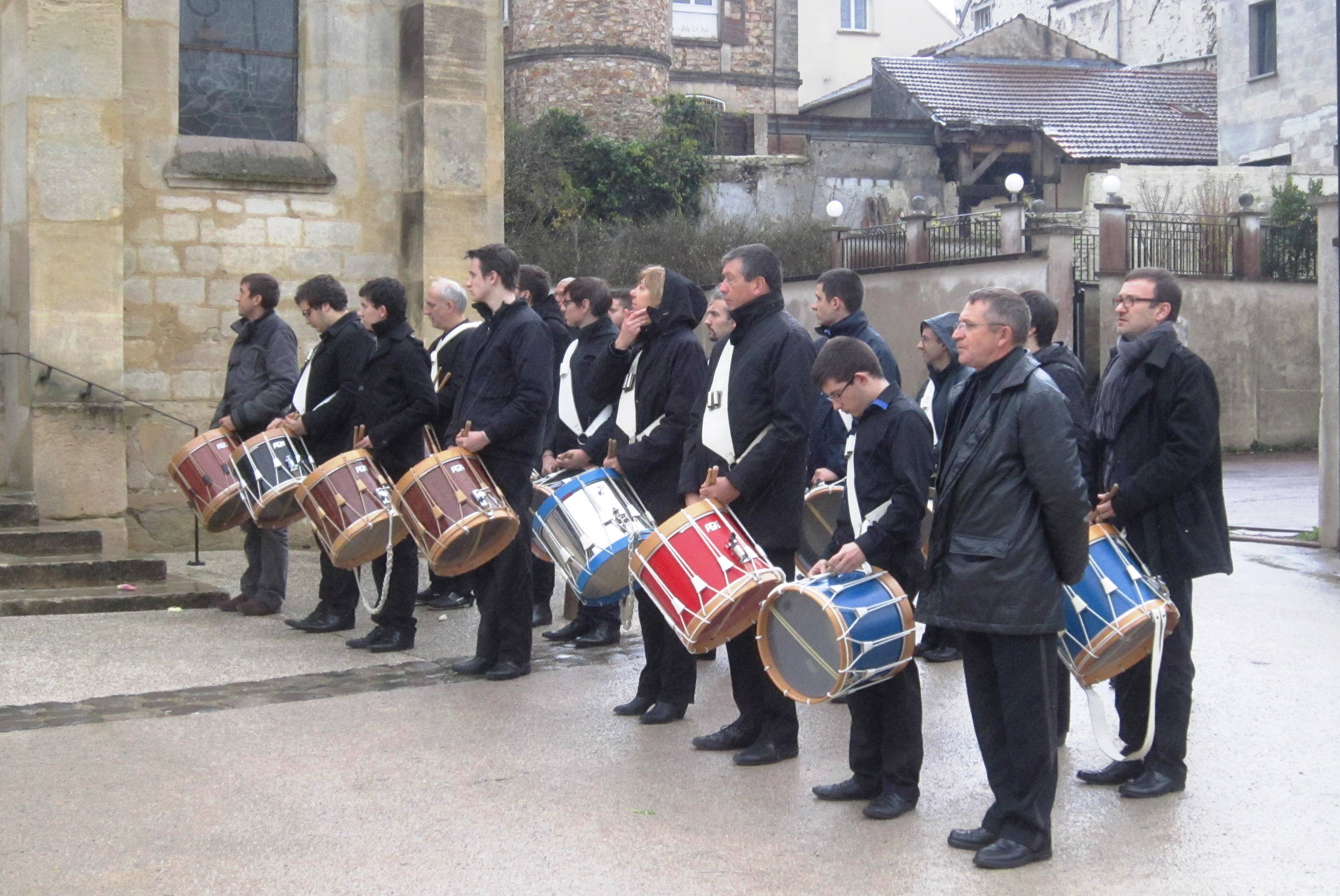
Goute's funeral ceremony

In the year following his departure from the French Sports and Cultural Federation (1980), Robert Goute was one of the founding members of the French Confederation of Drum Bands (CFBF). In 1986, Edgar Faure, president of the organizing committee of the celebrations of the French Revolution wanted a parade of 2,000 drums on the Champs-Élysées on July 14, 1989. Robert Goute was asked by Jean-Paul Goude to help organize the band within his show. He composed the drum program and Wally Badarou organized the instrumental part.

At the end of the event, Jack Lang spoke about the creation of a French drum federation, an instrument associated with the French national identity. Because of this, the International Federation of the French School of the Drum (FIEFT) was created in 1990. Goute was its first president. He developed the French drum technique with more than 20 foreign nations and ensured his presence in major international musical events before resigning his position as president for that of honorary president.

== Books ==
In 1954, Robert Goute published four volumes of a work devoted to the tambour d'ordonnance (orderly drum):

- Robert Goute (1956). Robert Martin (ed.). Le Tambour d'ordonnance. Vol. 1. Charnay-lès-Mâcon. ;
- Robert Goute (1970). Robert Martin (ed.). Le Tambour d'ordonnance. Vol. 2. Charnay-lès-Mâcon. ;
- Robert Goute (1974). Robert Martin (ed.). Le Tambour d'ordonnance. Vol. 3. Charnay-lès-Mâcon. ISMN 979-0-2310-2758-7. ;
- Robert Goute. Robert Martin (ed.). Le Tambour d'ordonnance. Vol. 4. Charnay-lès-Mâcon..

In 1962, Goute published the Manuel du tambour-major (manual of the drum major), the first educational work of its kind. It was praised by many military musicians and was reissued in 1988:

- Robert Goute (1962). Gaultier (ed.). Le Manuel du tambour-major. Chantonnay. p. 128. ;
- Robert Goute (1988). Robert Martin (ed.). Le manuel du tambour-major. Charnay-lès-Mâcon. p. 217. (réédition 1988).

This work is preceded and followed by many others including:

- Robert Goute (1960). Gaultier (ed.). Guide pratique de l'instruction. Chantonnay. p. 52. ;
- Robert Goute (1964). Robert Martin (ed.). Batteries de la Garde impériale. Charnay-lès-Mâcon. p. 28. ;
- Robert Goute (1980). Robert Martin (ed.). Initiation au solfège rythmique. Charnay-lès-Mâcon. p. 68..

and brief musical notes:

- Robert Goute (1963). Philippo (ed.). Tambour battant. Paris. p. 4. ;
- Robert Goute (1963). Philippo (ed.). Clandami. Paris. p. 3. ;
- Robert Goute (1965). Philippo (ed.). Gai luron. Paris. p. 8. ;
- Robert Goute (1985). Robert Martin (ed.). Pas à pas. Charnay-lès-Mâcon. p. 4. ;
- Robert Goute (1985). Robert Martin (ed.). Gironde. Charnay-lès-Mâcon. p. 7. ;

Its various methods and collections were later adopted in Switzerland, the Netherlands, Canada, and many American universities. (Note: Irving Bloch, professor at the University of Omaha (Nebraska), in contact with Robert Goute in 1945, contributed to the registration and protection of his works in the USA and invited him to the National Association of Rudimental Drummers)
