= Jutta Koether =

German artist and musician

- Born: 1958 (age 67–68); Cologne, West Germany
- Education: University of Cologne
- Known for: painting

Jutta Koether (born 1958) is a German artist, musician and critic based in New York City and Berlin since the early 1990s.

== Early life and education ==
Koether was born in Cologne and studied art and philosophy at the University of Cologne. She relocated to New York City in 1991.

== Career ==
Koether's paintings are exercises in color, line, form and pattern and often feature text. Her style has precedent in the work of Sigmar Polke and Kenny Scharf. She is also inspired by artists and intellectuals who have created an alternative to mainstream culture, including underground filmmaker Kenneth Anger and musician Patti Smith. She has collaborated with Sonic Youth’s Kim Gordon on a number of projects, for example Her Noise at Tate Modern in 2005. Koether's work is also affiliated with Martin Kippenberger. Their relationship began in Cologne when she interviewed him for Spex magazine. Although her work is not as grandiose as Kippenberger, both their works engage with the dense history of European, and more specifically, German painting.

For much of the 1990s, she mixed graffiti-inspired brushwork, fluorescent colors (especially bright pink), fragmented images and assorted quotations on surfaces that had a vibrant, all-over undergrowth. Her solo show at Pat Hearn Gallery, New York, in 1997 featured a soundtrack by the artist, accompanied by Tom Verlaine. Her visionary work, according to The New York Times art critic Roberta Smith, sees painting as multipurpose.

Koether’s 2009 show entitled Lux Exterior at Reena Spaulings further explored a common thematic in her work, the relation of painting with other aspects of theoretical and counter culture. Koether’s 2009 show was discussed in David Joselit’s essay entitled Painting Beside Itself. The exhibition, which included a painting entitled Hot Rod (after Poussin) (2009) along with sculptural found objects and a series of three performances, was noted by Joselit as a “sophisticated response to the question which I began [this essay]: How does a painting belong to a network?”

In spring 2012, Koether took part in the three-month exposition of Whitney Biennial. Around that time, she conceived two large series of works that respond directly to the French artist Nicolas Poussin, a reinterpretation of his The Seven Sacraments reimagined as a series of installations, and Seasons (2012), a response to Poussin’s The Four Seasons.

Since 1985, Koether has also worked as a reviewer and editor for many magazines and journals such as Spex, Texte zur Kunst, Flash Art and Artscribe.

Koether has taught at many institutions, including Columbia University, the Academy of Fine Arts in Berlin, Yale University, and Bard College. From 2010 until 2024 she was a professor at the Hochschule für bildende Künste Hamburg.

== Selected exhibitions ==
2024

- 1982,1983,1984, Galerie Buchholz, New York

2022

- Black Place, Artium Museoa, Museum of Contemporary Art of the Basque Country, Spain

2014

- Maquis, Galerie Francesca Pia, Zürich
- A Moveable Feast - Part XV, Campoli Presti, Paris
- Champrovement, Reena Spaulings, New York

2013

- Un établissement aux Folies-Koethère, Établissement d'en face projects, Brussels
- Cycle 1. Jutta Koether. Viktoria, Luise, Isabelle, Praxes, Berlin
- The Double Session, Campoli Presti, London
- Seasons and Sacraments, Arnolfini, Bristol, United Kingdom
- Seasons and Sacraments, Dundee Contemporary Arts, Dundee, United Kingdom

2012

- The Fifth Season, Bortolami Gallery, New York

2011

- Mad Garland, Campoli Presti, Paris
- The Thirst, Moderna Museet, Stockholm
- Berliner Schlussel, Galerie Daniel Buchholz, Berlin

2009

- Van Abbemuseum, Eindhoven
- Lux Interior, Reena Spaulings Fine Art, New York
- Sovereign Women in Painting, Susanne Vielmetter Los Angeles Projects, Los Angeles

2008

- New Yorker Fenster, Galerie Daniel Buchholz, Köln
- No.5, Kunsthall Landmark, Bergen
- JXXXA LEIBHAFTIGE MALEREI, Sutton Lane, Paris
- Touch and Resist, Song Song, Wien
- Galerie Francesca Pia, Zürich

2007

- Anderungen aller Art, Kunsthalle Bern, Bern

2006

- Love In a Void, Akademie der Bildenden Künste, Vienna
- Metalist Moment, Performance, Herald St, London

2005

- Very Lost Highway, Simultanhalle, Köln
- extreme harsh, Ausstellungsraum Ursula Werz, Tübingen
- I Is Had Gone, Thomas Erben Gallery, New York
- Her Noise, South London Gallery, London
- Blankness is not a Void, Standard Oslo, Oslo
- Kim Gordon and Jutta Koether, Talk and Performance at Tate Modern, London

2004

- Curious Crystals of Unusual Purity, P.S.1 Institute for Contemporary Art, New York City
- Fresh Aufhebung - Künstlerisches Interesse am philosophische verneinten Wunderglauben, Kölnischer Kunstverein, Köln
- Galerie Meerrettich, Berlin
- Fresh Aufhebung, 271 Grand Street, New York

2003

- Desire Is War, Galerie Meerrettich, Berlin
- The Club in the Shadow, in collaboration with Kim Gordon, Kenny Schachter conTEMPorary, New York

2002

- Black Bonds, Jutta Koether and Steven Parrino, Swiss Institute, New York
- Galerie Daniel Buchholz, Köln

2000

- Galerie Daniel Buchholz, Köln
- zur grünen schenke-fünf uhr nachmittags. die geheimen Bilder, Galerie Freund, Wien

1999

1998

Brushholder Value, Westfälischer Kunstverein, Münster

1994

Dysfunction USA, Arthur Rogers Gallery, New Orleans

1993

Parralax View: Cologne-New York, P.S. 1 Institute for Contemporary Art, New York

1987

Werkschau Jutta Koether, Kunstraum Stuttgart, Stuttgart
