= Galerie Buchholz =

Art gallery

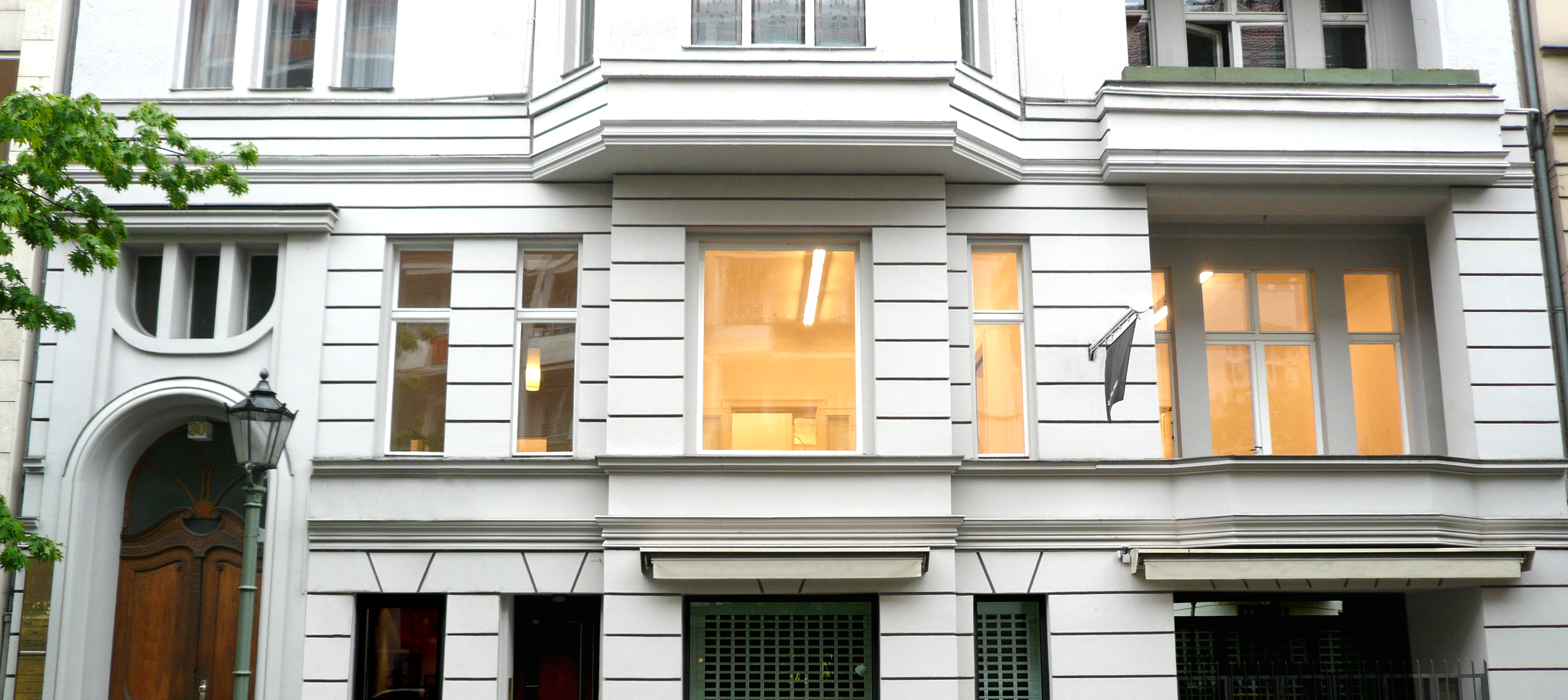
- Outside view of the Berlin office, Fasanenstraße, Berlin
- Location: Cologne, Berlin in Germany and New York City
- Coordinates: 40.7785°N 73.9611°W
- Website: www.galeriebuchholz.de

Galerie Buchholz is an art gallery specializing in international contemporary art with exhibition spaces in Cologne, Berlin and New York City. The gallery was founded in Cologne in 1986 by Daniel Buchholz, and today is run jointly with Christopher Müller.

== History ==
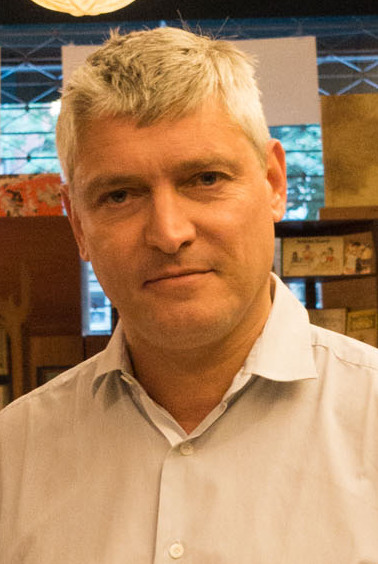
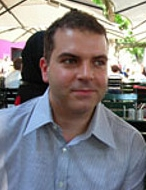
Daniel Buchholz (left) founded Galerie Buchholz in 1986 and is now jointly run by Buchholz and Christopher Müller (right).

The gallery's exhibition spaces are located in Cologne at Neven-DuMont-Strasse 17, in Berlin at Fasanenstrasse 30, and in New York at 17 East 82nd Street. Since its founding the gallery has had various locations in Cologne. Its first location was at Bismark Strasse 50, in a former storage facility of the Cologne gallerist Rudolf Zwirner. In 1988, the gallery opened at Venloer Strasse 21. In 1990, Buchholz and gallerist Esther Schipper opened Buchholz & Schipper, a shop specializing in multiples, at Albertusstrasse 26. In 1992, Buchholz & Buchholz opened on Breite Strasse 36, an exhibition space in the second antique bookshop of Daniel Buchholz's father.

Since 1994, Galerie Daniel Buchholz has been located at Neven-DuMont-Strasse 17, in the primary location of the antiquarian bookstore that his father founded. Daniel Buchholz converted the former storage spaces of the bookstore into exhibition spaces, and, since his father's death in 1993, has continued to run Antiquariat Buchholz parallel to the gallery. This address remains the headquarters for the gallery today. The art historian Christopher Müller began organizing film programs and co-curating exhibitions in the gallery in 1996. Since 2000 he has been a partner in the gallery.

In 2008, Galerie Buchholz established a location at Fasanenstrasse 30 in the Charlottenburg neighborhood of Berlin.

In 2015, it opened an exhibition space in New York City, at 17 East 82nd Street on the Upper East Side, Manhattan.

== Exhibitions ==
In 1985, Daniel Buchholz organized exhibitions with artists John Armleder and Brian Eno in the former storage facility of Rudolf Zwirner in Cologne. Following this, he founded a space called Daniel Buchholz, where he mounted exhibitions of John M. Armleder, Olivier Mosset, Udo Lefin, Allan Belcher and Uwe Lausen, Ken Lum, Dieter Roth and the Canadian artist collective General Idea. In 1987 Buchholz organized an exhibition on the history of multiples and exhibitions of the complete graphic works of Blinky Palermo and Sigmar Polke. In the same year, Buchholz presented his first collaboration with the artist Isa Genzken. Buchholz organized her exhibition project Musix, in which he showed Genzken's concrete "World Receiver" radio sculptures in the window of a HiFi electronics store in Cologne. In the following of 1988, Genzken had her first solo exhibition with Daniel Buchholz, and has been primarily represented by the gallery ever since. In 1990 Daniel Buchholz presented the exhibition project "Samson" by Chris Burden. In 1992 he organised an exhibition of Paul Thek at the Castello di Rivara in Turin. In 1993 Daniel Buchholz opened a new gallery under the name Buchholz & Buchholz. It was here that he presented his first exhibition by the artist Wolfgang Tillmans, whom the gallery continues to represent today.

Alongside the exhibitions by represented artists, Galerie Buchholz regularly presents curated and historical exhibitions. For example, the 2013 and 2015 exhibitions on the life and work of French writer Raymond Roussel; or the 2014 symposium and exhibition on the occasion of the 70th birthday of the American theorist and curator Douglas Crimp, organized together with Diedrich Diederichsen, Juliane Rebentisch and Marc Siegel. In 2017, Christopher Müller and Diedrich Diederichsen organized the exhibition "Cosmic Communities: Coming Out Into Outer Space - Homofuturism, Applied Psychedelia & Magic Connectivity" in the New York gallery. In 2012, the gallery organised an exhibition project with German playwright and director René Pollesch, which culminated in a publication.

The gallery participates in the fairs Art Basel, Art Basel Miami Beach, Art Cologne, and Paris+ par Art Basel.

== Publications ==
In 1997, the gallery began publishing artist catalogues under its own press, including monographs on Isa Genzken, Jutta Koether, Michael Krebber, and Wolfgang Tillmans. The gallery has also published a work of scholarship by Michael Sanchez on the French author Raymond Roussel.

== Artists ==
- Tomma Abts
- Lutz Bacher
- Alvin Baltrop
- Tony Conrad
- Matt Browning
- Caleb Considine
- Moyra Davey
- Trisha Donnelly
- Lukas Duwenhögger
- Melvin Edwards
- Cerith Wyn Evans
- Vincent Fecteau
- Peter Fischli
- Isa Genzken
- Jack Goldstein
- Julian Göthe
- Richard Hawkins
- Samuel Hindolo
- Anne Imhof
- Sergej Jensen
- John Kelsey
- Jochen Klein
- Jutta Koether
- Michael Krebber
- Mark Leckey
- Sherrie Levine
- Monica Majoli
- Diego Marcon
- Lucy McKenzie
- Elie Nadelman
- Yair Oelbaum
- Henrik Olesen
- Silke Otto-Knapp
- Vera Palme
- Mathias Poledna
- Florian Pumhösl
- R.H. Quaytman
- Cameron Rowland
- Heji Shin
- Frances Stark
- Josef Strau
- Gili Tal
- Paul Thek
- Mayo Thompson
- Wolfgang Tillmans
- Stewart Uoo
- Ulla Wiggen
- Martin Wong
- Katharina Wulff

== Gallery ==
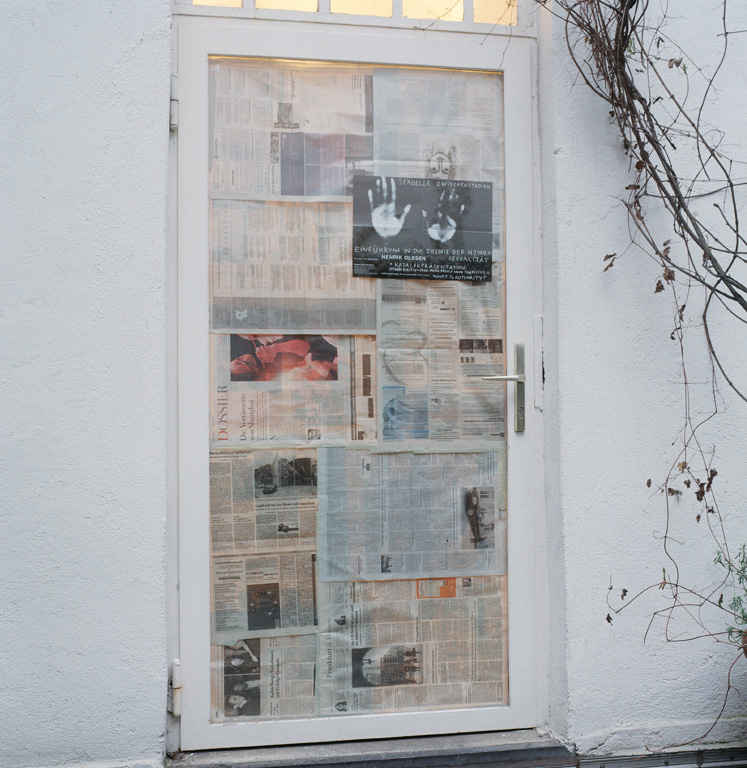
Installation view, Henrik Olesen in the Neven-DuMont-Straße, Cologne

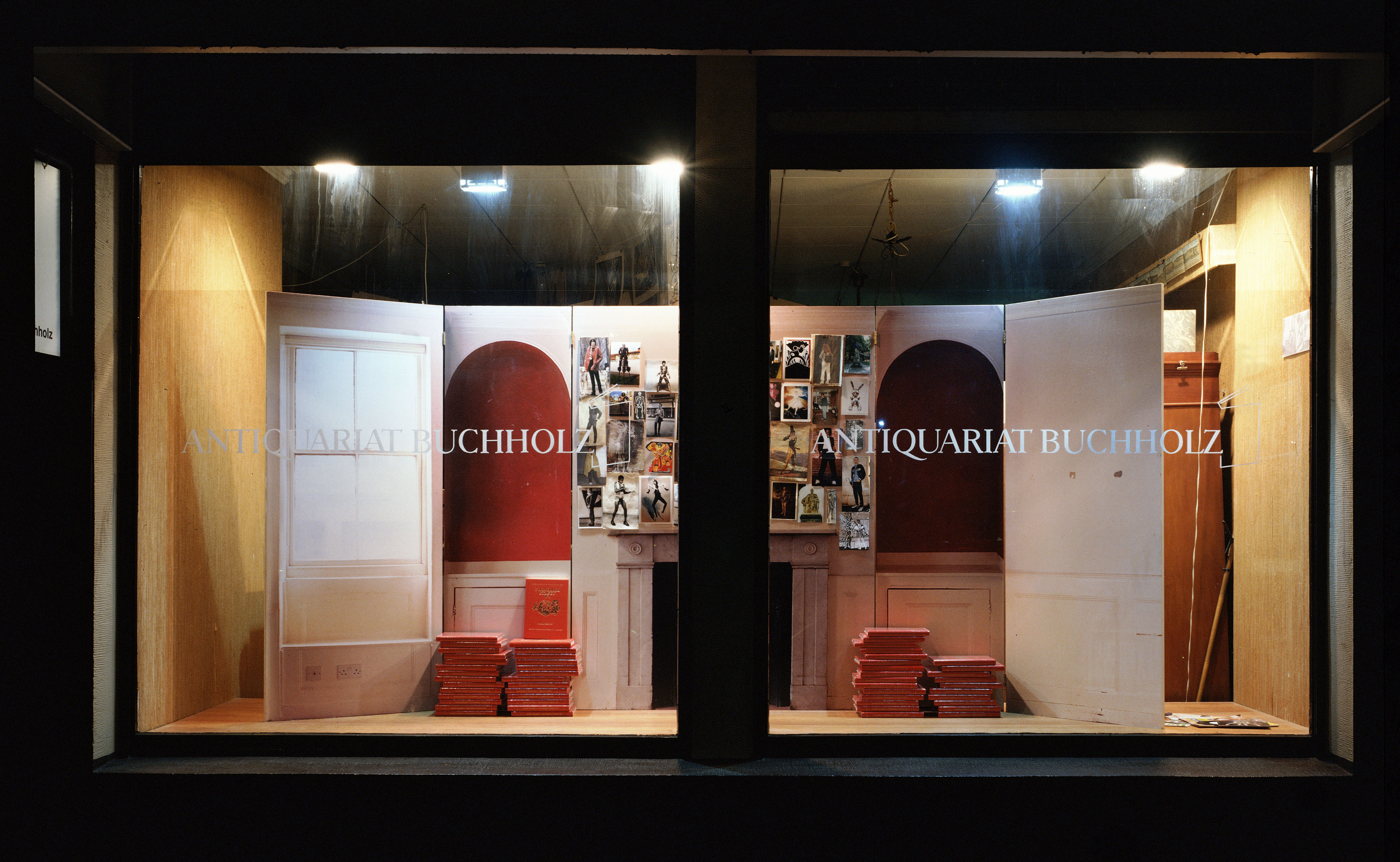
Window of the antiquarian bookshop Buchholz in the Neven-DuMont-Straße, Installation view of Mark Leckey, 2007

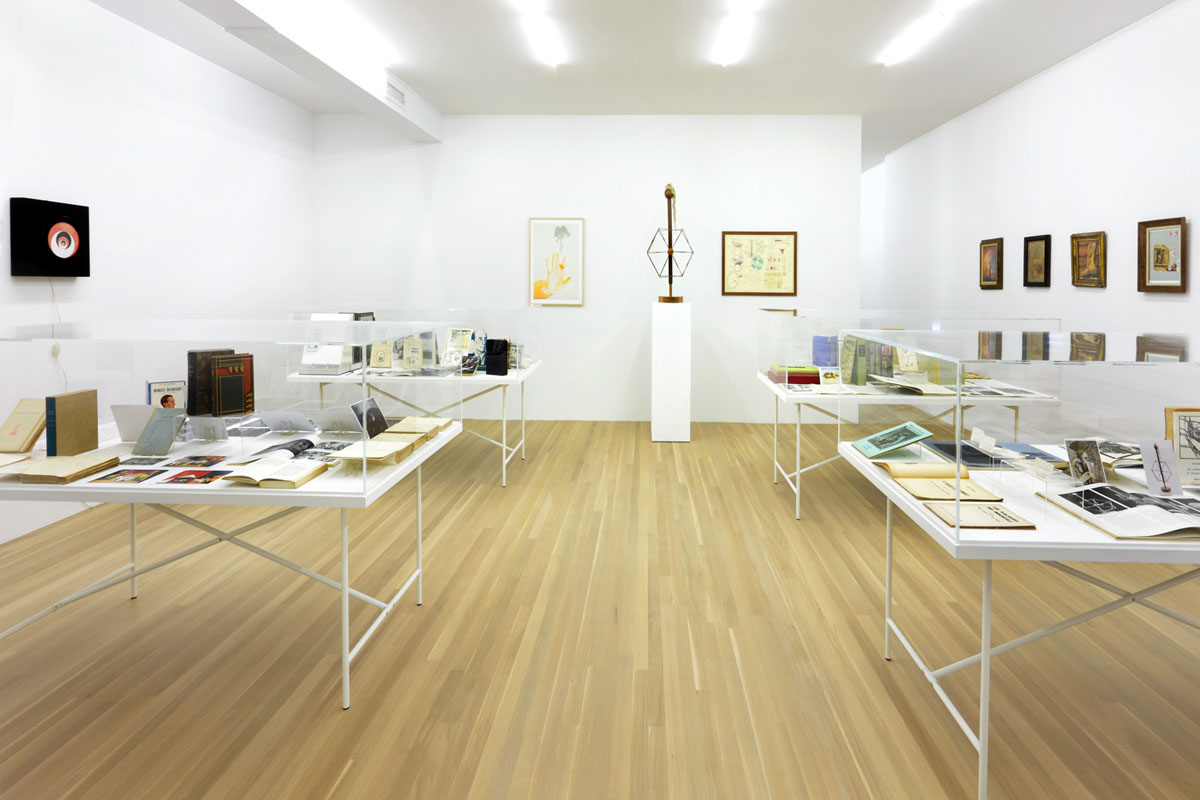
Raymond Roussel, installation view Galerie Buchholz, New York 2015

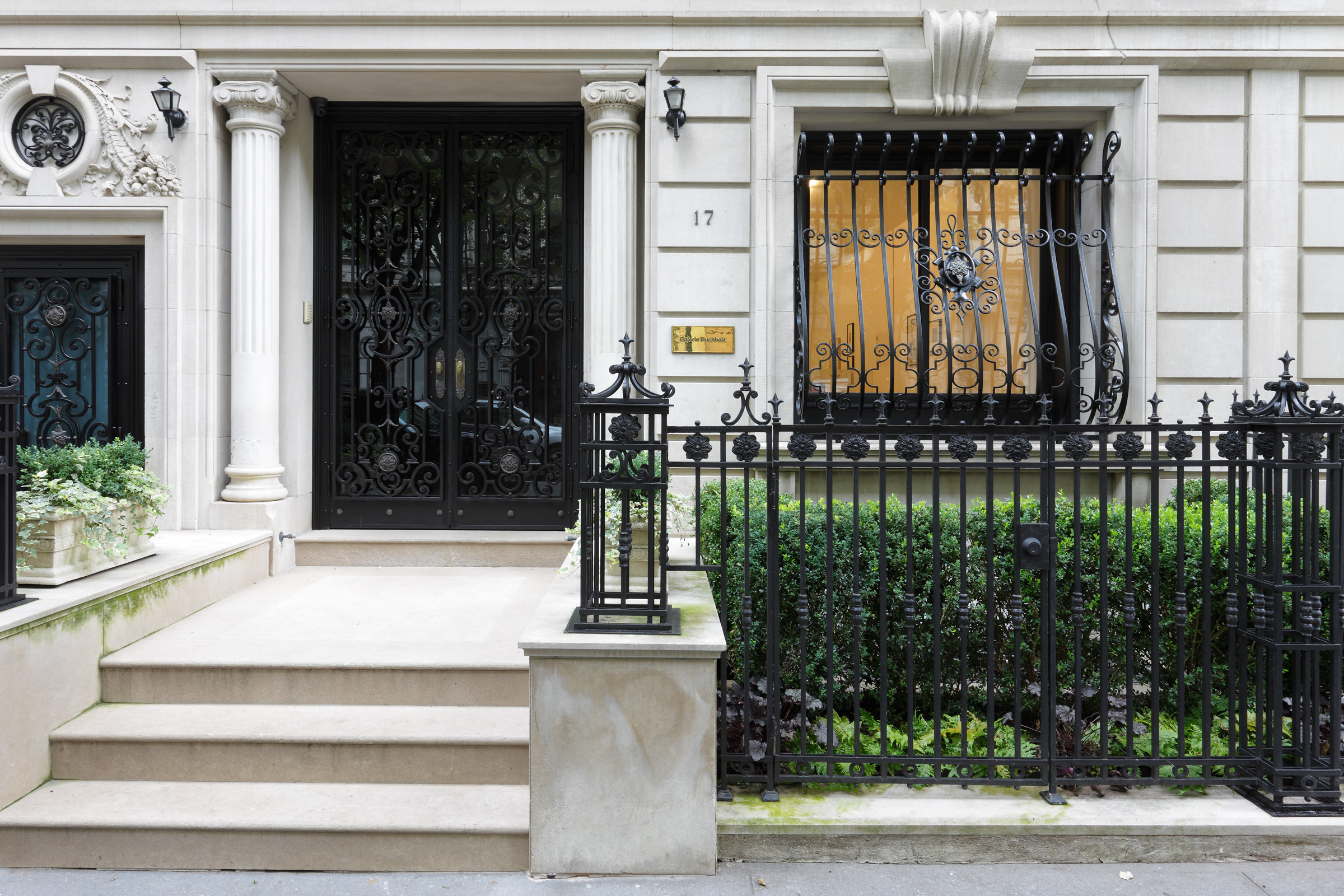
Galerie Buchholz, New York 2015, Credit line: Courtesy Galerie Buchholz, New York
