= Daniel Buchholz =

German art dealer

Daniel Buchholz is a German art dealer, the founder of Galerie Buchholz in Berlin and Cologne.

== Gallery ==
Buchholz founded Galerie Buchholz in Cologne in 1986, and a further gallery in Berlin in 2008.

Since 2022, Buchholz has been serving on the selection committee of Art Basel's Paris edition.

== Recognition ==
In 2014, The Guardian named Buchholz in their "Movers and makers: the most powerful people in the art world".
