= Texte zur Kunst =

German contemporary art magazine

- Editor-in-chief: Anna Sinofzik
- Categories: art magazines
- Frequency: Quarterly
- Circulation: 5000
- Publisher: Isabelle Graw
- Founder: Stefan Germer and Isabelle Graw
- Founded: 1990
- Country: Germany
- Based in: Berlin
- Language: German, English
- Website: www.textezurkunst.de
- ISSN: 0940-9459

Texte zur Kunst is a German contemporary art magazine.

== History ==
Texte zur Kunst was founded in 1990 in Cologne by art historian Stefan Germer and art critic Isabelle Graw. It has been published in Berlin since 2000. Since the death of Stefan Germer in 1998, Graw has acted as publication's sole publisher.

== Contents ==
Texte zur Kunst is published in the journal format of 166 x 230 mm and contains approximately 300 pages. Issues are thematic and feature essays, interviews, and round-table discussions that address culture-sector questions relating to contemporary art, socio-political theory, and cultural policy from an art historical and sociological perspective. Its thematic issue focuses on art, institutional critique, feminism and media criticism.

The magazine is influenced by the journal October, but differentiates itself by also covering pop-culture. Unlike other art magazines, it aims to critically examine rather than promote art and demystify the production conditions of art.

== Editions ==
With each issue, Texte zur Kunst offers artist's editions by contemporary artists, which help support the journal's publication.

== Editors & Advisory Board ==
Editorial staff past & present (partial list):

Isabelle Graw & Stefan Germer (EICs), Isabell Lorey, Astrid Wege, Tom Holert, Clemens Krümmel (EIC), Sabeth Buchmann, Susanne Leeb, Martin Conrads, Esther Buss, André Rottmann (EIC), Mirjam Thomann, Sven Beckstette (EIC), John Beeson, Oona Lochner, Philipp Ekardt (EIC), Hanna Magauer, Caroline Busta (EIC), Anke Dyes, Colin Lang (EIC), Nadja Abt, Katharina Hausladen (EIC), Genevieve Lipinsky de Orlov, Christian Liclair (EIC), Antonia Kölbl, Anna Sinofzik.

The journal is guided by an advisory board appointed by Graw. Members include: Sven Beckstette, Sabeth Buchmann, Helmut Draxler, Jutta Koether, Mahret Ifeoma Kupka, Dirk von Lowtzow, Ana Magalhães, Hanna Magauer, Irene V. Small, Beate Söntgen and Brigitte Weingart.

== Exhibition ==
In 2010, artist's editions from the 20 previous years were shown in the Sammlung Haubrok

== Bibliography ==
- Erste Wahl. 20 Jahre „Texte zur Kunst“. 2 Bde. Philo Fine Arts, Hamburg 2011.
  - 1. Dekade. Philo Fine Arts, Hamburg 2011, ISBN 978-3-86572-667-4. (Fundus-Bücher. 200)
  - 2. Dekade. Philo Fine Arts, Hamburg 2011, ISBN 978-3-86572-668-1. (Fundus-Bücher. 201)
- Chevalier, Catherine; Fohr, Andreas; Baumann, Daniel (2010). Une anthologie de la revue Texte zur Kunst de 1990 à 1998 (in French). Presses du réel; JRP/Ringier. ISBN 9782840662358. OCLC 780080342.
