= Tue Greenfort =

Danish artist (born 1973)

Tue Greenfort (born 1973) is a Danish artist best known for his environmentalist works. He studied at the Hochschule für Bildende Künste–Städelschule in Frankfurt am Main and at Funen Art Academy in Denmark.

== Selected solo exhibitions ==
2009 Frieze Projects, London
2009 Linear Deflection, Kunstverein Braunschweig, Braunschweig
2009 Fondazione Morra Greco, Naples
2007 Johann König, Berlin
2007 Medusa, Secession, Vienna
2006 Max Wigram Gallery, London
2006 Witte de With, Rotterdam, curated by Florian Waldvogel and Zoë Gray
2005 Betreten des Grundstücks erlaubt, Kunstverein Arnsberg
2004 Umwelt, Gallery Zero, Milan

== Selected group exhibitions ==
2012 Arts in Marrakech (AiM) International Biennale 'Higher Atlas', Marrakech
2010 Rethink Kakotopia, Tensta Konsthall, Stockholm
2009 Rethink Kakotopia, Nikolaj, Copenhagen Contemporary Art Center
2009 GSK Contemporary: Earth, Royal Academy of Arts, London
2009 Life forms, Bonniers Konsthall, Stockholm
2009 Beyond These Walls, South London Gallery, London
2008 Flower Power, Rauma Biennale, Rauma Art Museum, Balticum
2008 Supernatural, CCA Andratx, Mallorca
2007 Ironie der Objekte, Museion, Bozen
2007 Made in Germany, Sprengel Museum, Hanover
2007 Crédac, Galerie Fernand Léger, Paris.
2004 Prisma, Galerie Martin Janda, Vienna
