= Air de Paris =

- Established: 1990
- Location: 43, rue de la Commune de Paris Romainville, France
- Director: Florence Bonnefous & Edouard Merino
- Website: www.airdeparis.com

Air de Paris was a contemporary art gallery owned and directed by Florence Bonnefous and Edouard Merino from 1990 to 2026, located in Nice, Paris and later Romainville, France.

== History ==
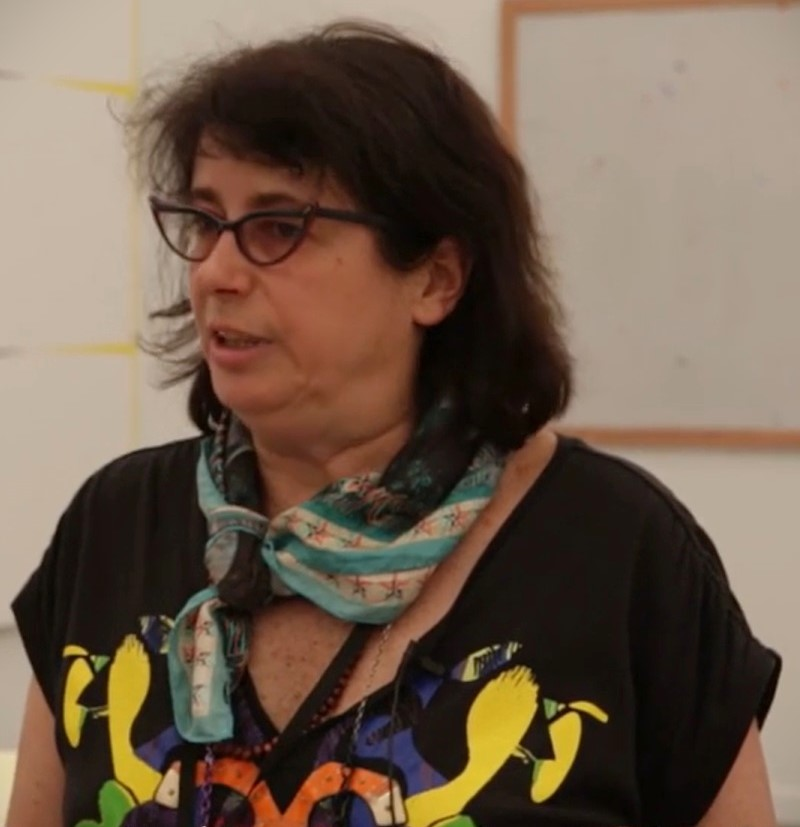
Florence Bonnefous in 2013

In 1990 Air de Paris was established in Nice by Bonnefous and Merino, who had attended the École du Magasin in Grenoble together. In 1994, the gallery relocated to Paris, first at a location on rue des Haudriettes. Alongside other galleries including Almine Rech and Galerie Perrotin, Air de Paris moved to spaces on Rue Louise Weiss in the 13th arrondissement in 1997, as part a city-sponsored initiative. In 2019, Air de Paris joined forces with three other galleries (Jocelyn Wolff, In Situ Fabienne Leclerc and Sator), a public institution Le Plateau frac île de france and Fiminco Foundation to open spaces in Komunuma, an 11,000 m^{2} (120,000 sq ft) four-building arts complex in Romainville. Together with In Situ Fabienne Leclerc, the gallery occupied a four-storey space and a shared roof terrace.

The name "Air de Paris" was a tribute to Marcel Duchamp and his "ready-made" 50cc of Paris Air. At the beginning, there was Les Ateliers du Paradise with Philippe Perrin, Pierre Joseph and Philippe Parreno. Paul McCarthy, Lily van der Stokker and Jean-Luc Verna, among others, participated to the reputation of the Nicean formula.

Air de Paris represented established practicing artists such as Liam Gillick, Claire Fontaine, and Trisha Donnelly, historically important artists such as Guy de Cointet, Dorothy Iannone and Allen Ruppersberg, and emerging artists such as Eliza Douglas and Aaron Flint Jamison. Air de Paris also represented the photographic work of Michel Houellebecq following his large survey exhibition at Palais de Tokyo in 2016.

In 2026, Air de Paris declared bankruptcy and ceased operations.

== Artists ==
Air de Paris represented numerous living artists, including:

- Leonor Antunes
- Sadie Benning
- Trisha Donnelly
- Guyton\Walker
- Joseph Grigely
- Carsten Höller
- Michel Houellebecq
- M/M (Paris)
- Emma McIntyre
- Sarah Morris
- Philippe Parreno
- Rob Pruitt
- Torbjørn Rødland

== Art fairs ==
Air de Paris was present at many contemporary art fairs including Art Basel (1999–2025), Independent in New York, FIAC in Paris and Artissima in Turin. From 2022, Bonnefous served on the selection committee of Art Basel's Paris edition.
