= Henrik Olesen =

Danish artist

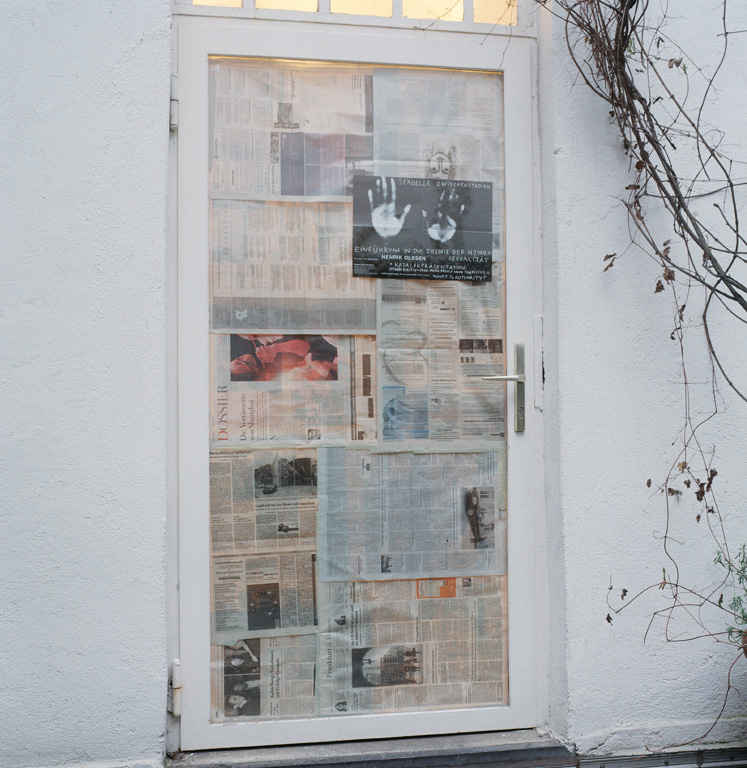
Installation view, in the Neven-DuMont-Straße, Cologne Galerie Buchholz

Henrik Olesen (b. 1967) is a Danish artist working in Berlin. He has been featured in exhibitions in New York City, Sweden, and Austria.

Olesen was born in Esbjerg. He studied at the Royal Danish Academy of Fine Arts in Copenhagen from 1989 to 1996.

Project 94 at the Museum of Modern Art in early 2011 was Olesen's first U.S. solo museum show, in which, according to Valery Oisteanu in The Brooklyn Rail, "Olesen probes homosexuality’s criminalization, past and present, through the appropriation of source materials and contextual shifts."

Henrik Olesen is represented by Galerie Buchholz, Cologne, and galerie dépendance, Brussels.
