= Lily van der Stokker =

Dutch visual artist

- Lily van der Stokker
- Born: 1954 (age 71–72); Den Bosch, Netherlands
- Education: AKV St. Joost
- Known for: Painting
- Style: Art Installation

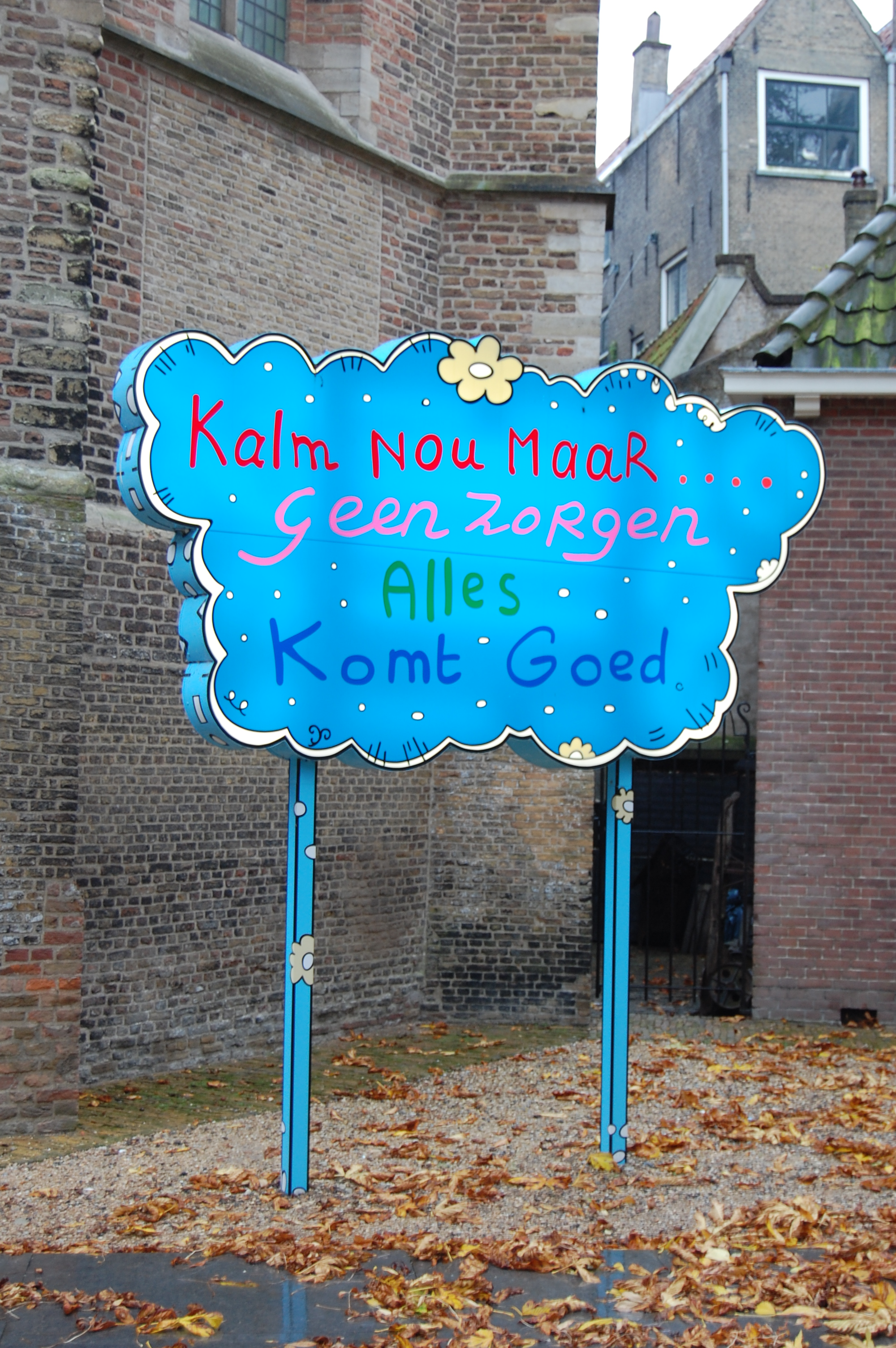
Lily van der Stokker, Kalm nou maar... at the Museum Gouda

Lily van der Stokker (born 1954) is a Dutch visual artist. She makes painted murals and installations that combine handwritten texts with flowers, doodles and pastel and fluorescent colors, and since the 1980s has used this style to question which subjects and aesthetics are treated as serious art.

Van der Stokker has had solo exhibitions at institutions including the Stedelijk Museum in Amsterdam, the Van Abbemuseum in Eindhoven, Tate St Ives, the Hammer Museum in Los Angeles and Camden Arts Centre in London. Her public works include the exterior of an exhibition building painted pink for Expo 2000 in Hanover and a large teapot sculpture in Utrecht. In 2025 she opened a project space in Amsterdam, Stokker Jaeger. She lives and works in New York City and Amsterdam.

== Early life and education ==
Lily van der Stokker was born in Den Bosch, Netherlands. She studied monumental design and painting at the Academy of Art and Design St. Joost in Breda from 1975 to 1979, and earlier studied drawing and textiles at the R.K. Scholengemeenschap St. Dionysus in Tilburg.

She divides her time between New York City and Amsterdam. For many years she was the partner of the American cameraman, artist and curator Jack Jaeger (1937–2013), with whom she lived alternately in the two cities.

== Style and themes ==
Van der Stokker traces her approach to her time at art school in the 1970s, when monochrome abstraction was dominant and the idea of the "death of painting" was widely discussed. She began incorporating flowers in her work in the late 1980s, and has described flowers as a taboo in the art world because of their association with children, women and the domestic. Her paintings and murals use pastel tones and fluorescent paints that she mixes herself.

The work frequently includes handwritten texts referring to ordinary and often overlooked subjects, such as household chores, aging, illness, money and childcare. From the 1980s Van der Stokker set this soft, personal and decorative work against the "macho" minimalism that dominated at the time. She has said her use of text relates to that of the American artist Barbara Kruger.

In the Netherlands she came to be described as a pioneer of meisjeskunst ("girls' art"); in a 2026 interview she said she would rather drop the label because it sets her work apart as an exception. In 2025 her work was shown at the Stedelijk Museum Schiedam; in press coverage of that exhibition she, Kinke Kooi and Pipilotti Rist were described as pioneers of the genre.

== Exhibitions ==
Van der Stokker has exhibited her work widely, including one-person shows at the Stedelijk Museum, Amsterdam (2018); Museum Ludwig, Cologne, Germany (2003); Galerie Air de Paris, Paris (2014, 2005, 2000); Tate Museum St. Ives, Cornwall, England (2012); and the Van Abbemuseum, Eindhoven, Netherlands (2005–7), among others. She was commissioned by the Hammer Museum in Los Angeles to create an installation. Her large-scale installation Huh was exhibited at Koenig and Clinton Gallery, New York, in 2014.

Her 2018 solo exhibition at the Stedelijk Museum, Friendly Good, brought together murals, drawings and installations, among them Tidy Kitchen; de Volkskrant reviewed it with four out of five stars.

In 2022 she presented the exhibition Thank You Darling at Camden Arts Centre in London. In 2026 the gallery kaufmann repetto in New York showed Male Art Exhibition, Great Show!, for which she applied to male artists the kind of gendered categorization her own work had long received; the roughly eighty new pieces included White male artists working with rectangles and Machismo Top Ten (in Blue). She described the show as a "correction fantasy".

== Public art works ==
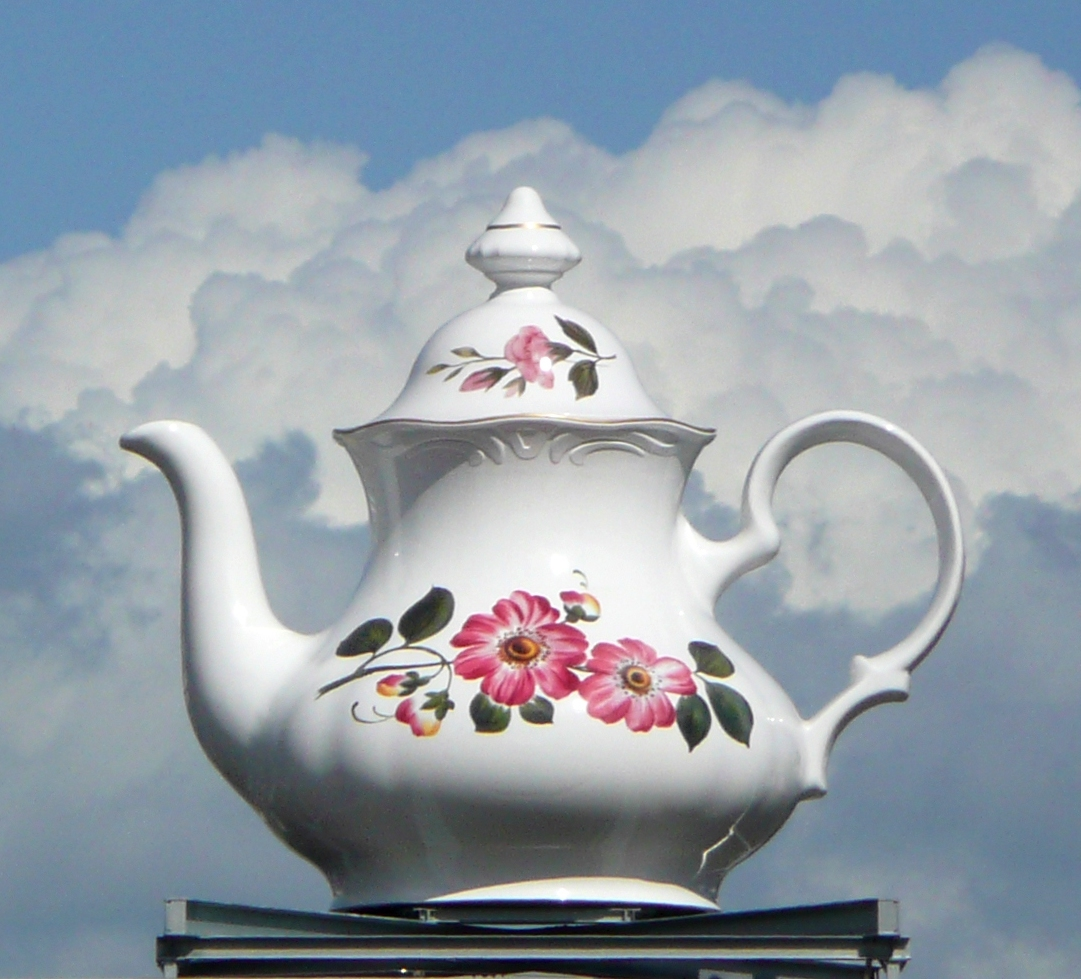
Lily van der Stokker, Celestial Teapot, public art work, 2013

Van der Stokker has made several large-scale public works. For Expo 2000 in Hanover she painted the exterior of a fifteen-story exhibition building pink, with white flowers, in a work titled The Pink Building. In 2013 she installed Celestial Teapot, a flowered teapot sculpture about seven meters high, near the Hoog Catharijne shopping center in Utrecht. For the High Line in New York she made a mural titled Thank You Darling.

== Stokker Jaeger ==
In 2025 Van der Stokker opened Stokker Jaeger, a project space in the Lomanstraat in Amsterdam. Rather than her own work, the space shows work by friends and by the assistants who help her make her murals; she has said it operates without sponsors or subsidies and is not run as a commercial gallery. The space is also intended to house the De Stokker Jaeger Foundation, which is to manage the works and archives of Van der Stokker and Jack Jaeger after her death.

== Collections ==
Her work is in the collection of the Stedelijk Museum, Amsterdam. Twelve of her works are in the collection of the Van Abbemuseum, Eindhoven.
