= Ulla Wiggen =

Swedish painter (born 1942)

Ulla Wiggen (born 1942) is a Swedish painter. Wiggen is known for her paintings that interpret electronic circuitry and schematic diagrams. In the late 1960s, she was also known for her figure paintings.

== Early life and education ==
Wiggen was born in Stockholm in 1942. She studied at the Art Academy in Stockholm from 1962 to 1963, the Royal College of Art in Stockholm from 1967 to 1972, the Nordic Psychotherapeutic College from 1972 to 1974, and the Psychology Education Stockholm University from 1978 to 1986.

== Life and work ==
During the 1960's, Wiggen produced a series of painted works based on images of early computers and electronic components. Between the years 1963-64, she began making small paintings on gauze using gouache. In 1966, while working as an assistant to the artist Öyvind Fahlström, she participated in performances that were part of 9 Evenings: Theatre & Engineering in New York, part of Experiments in Art and Technology. In 1968, she was involved with the intermedia and new electronic music association, Fylkingen.

Her first exhibition was presented in 1968 at the Galleri Prisma, in Stockholm; later that year she exhibited in the Cybernetic Serendipity: The Computer and the Arts show at the Institute of Contemporary Arts, London as well as the Public Eye exhibition at the Kunsthaus Hamburg.

Her diagramatic paintings from the mid-to-late 1960s depict electronic circuitry, and have been described as dense and obsessive images with an "arcane strangeness." She worked in gouache at a small scale and in oil paint, and then arrived at a technique where she used gauze bandages to create areas of texture resembling electronic components such as soldered wires and transistors.

Writing in Artforum magazine, critic Ina Blom states that Wiggen's paintings open up a narrative on "girls and technology" referring to "the long history of women as members of the workforce in the electronic industries, for instance, their labor in this capacity recalling the disciplined, quiet meticulousness associated with women’s crafts—the countless generations of nimble hands and keen eyes engaged in the most intricate needlework or weaving—represented today by images of female workers in factories in China or Vietnam assembling tiny mobile-phone components on grueling twelve-hour shifts." She goes on to write that Wiggen's technical abstractions bypass the "human sensorium" to convey an engagement with the "unknowable" aspects of electronic technology, revealing its "deepest secrets.

In 1995, she exhibited at the Ynglingagatan-1 gallery in Stockholm, and in 2012, her work was included in the Ghosts in the Machine exhibition at the Museum of Modern Art, New York.

Between the late 1970s to 2013, she primarily made her living as a licensed psychotherapist. She then had a groundbreaking show of her early work at the Moderna Museet which restarted her artistic practice.

=== Exhibitions ===
Wiggen's work was included in the 2022 edition of La Biennale di Venizia. In 2024, the Fridericianum Museum in Kassel, Germany presents a solo show on her work.

=== Awards ===
In 2023, Wiggen received the city of Stockholm's cultural prize stads Hederspris/Konst award valued at SEK 100,000.

=== Publications ===
In 2022, a monograph on Wiggen's work was published with texts by Daniel Birnbaum, Sabeth Buchmann, Caleb Considine and Peter Cornell.

== Collections ==
Her work is included in the collections of:

- Moderna Museet, Stockholm,
- Norrköping Art Museum, Sweden,
- Göteborgs Museum of Art, Sweden,
- Västerås Konstmuseum, Sweden,
- Gävle Museum, Sweden and
- Malmo Art Museum, Malmo, Sweden.
