= Isa Genzken =

German contemporary artist (born 1948)

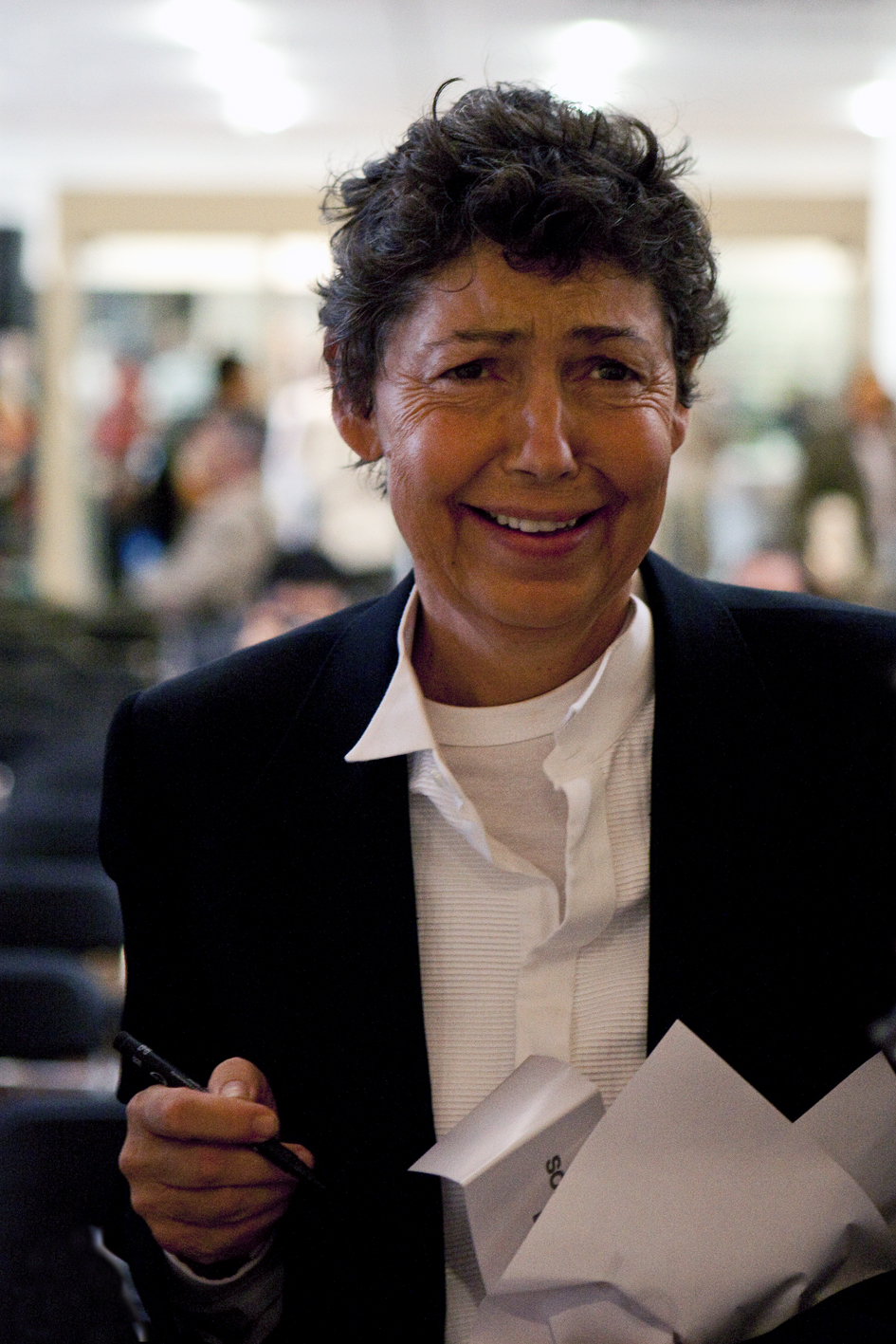
- Genzken in 2009
- Born: 27 November 1948 (age 77); Bad Oldesloe, Schleswig-Holstein, Germany
- Education: Kunstakademie Düsseldorf, Hamburg University of Fine Arts and Berlin University of the Arts

Isa Genzken (born 27 November 1948) is a German artist who lives and works in Berlin. Her primary media are sculpture and installation, using a wide variety of materials, including concrete, plaster, wood and textile. She also works with photography, video, film and collage.

== Early life and education ==
Hanne-Rose "Isa" Genzken (pronounced EE-sa GENZ-ken) was raised mostly in the small northern German city of Bad Oldesloe and in Hamburg.

She studied fine arts and art history with Almir Mavignier and Kai Sudeck at the Hamburg University of Fine Arts (1968–1971) and the Berlin University of the Arts (1971–1973). To pay her tuition, Genzken worked part-time as a model. In 1973 she transferred to Arts Academy Düsseldorf while also studying art history and philosophy at the University of Cologne. At the academy, fellow students included artists Katharina Fritsch and Thomas Struth.

Upon graduating in 1977, Genzken taught sculpture at the academy. She married German visual artist Gerhard Richter in 1982 and moved to Cologne in 1983. The couple separated in 1993 and Genzken moved back to Berlin.

Genzken has bipolar disorder, goes through manic and depressive phases and has spent time in psychiatric hospitals. She has frequently undergone treatment for substance abuse. In a 2016 interview, she said that her alcohol problems began after her divorce and that she had been sober since 2013.

Genzken has worked in studios in Düsseldorf, Cologne (designed in 1993 by architect Frank Tebroke); for short stretches in the United States, in Lower Manhattan and Hoboken, New Jersey; and currently in Berlin.

== Work ==
Although Isa Genzken's primary focus is sculpture, she has produced various media including photography, film, video, works on paper, works on canvas with oil, collages, collage books, film scripts, and even a record. Her diverse practice draws on the legacies of Constructivism and Minimalism and often involves a critical, open dialogue with Modernist architecture and contemporary visual and material culture. Genzken's diverse work also keeps her from being predictable in her work. Despite Genzken's diverse work, much of her practice still maintains conventions of traditional sculpture. Using plaster, cement, building samples, photographs, and bric-a-brac, Genzken creates architectonic structures that have been described as contemporary ruins. She further incorporates mirrors and other reflective surfaces to literally draw the viewer into her work. Genzken also uses location placement methods to inflict emotions into her sculpture viewers by making her viewers physically move out of the way of Genzken's sculpture due to the placement of the sculpture. The column is a recurring motif for Genzken, a "pure" architectural trope on which to explore relationships between "high art" and the mass-produced products of popular culture.

In the 1970s, Genzken began working with wood that she carved into unusual geometric shapes such as hyperboloids and ellipsoids. In the photographs of her Hi-Fi-Serie (1979), she reproduced advertisements for stereo phonographs.

Bild (Painting) (1989) at the Museum of Modern Art in 2022

In 1980, Genzken and Gerhard Richter were commissioned to design the König-Heinrich-Platz underground station in Duisburg; it was completed in 1992. Between 1986 and 1992, Genzken conceived her series of plaster and concrete sculptures to investigate architecture. These sculptures consist of sequentially poured and stacked slabs of concrete featuring rough openings, windows and interiors. A later series consists of other architectural or interior design quotations made from epoxy resin casts, such as column or lamp sculptures. In 1986, Genzken's architectural references switched from the 1910s, 20s and 30s to the 1950s, 60s and 70s. In 1990 she installed a steel frame, Camera (1990) on a Brussels gallery's rooftop, offering a view of the city below. In 2000, a series of architectural models roughly patched together, was inscribed with Fuck the Bauhaus. Later, in the series New Buildings for Berlin, which was shown at Documenta 11, Genzken designed architectural visions of glass high-rises.

The project entitled Der Spiegel 1989–1991 is a series of images comprising 121 reproductions of black and white photographs selected and cut from German newsweekly Der Spiegel. Presented in a non-sequential but methodical manner, each image is glued against a piece of white card and individually mounted in a simple frame. Whilst the images themselves remain caption-less, the dates in the series' titles offer clues about the artist's intentions.

Her paintings of suspended hoops, collectively entitled MLR (More Light Research) (1992), recall gymnastics apparatus caught mid-swing and frozen in time.

Starting in 1995, while in New York for several months, Genzken created a three-volume collage book entitled I Love New York, Crazy City (1995–1996), a compendium of souvenirs from her various stays in the city, including photographs of Midtown's architecture, snapshots, maps, hotel bills, nightclub flyers, and concert tickets, among others.

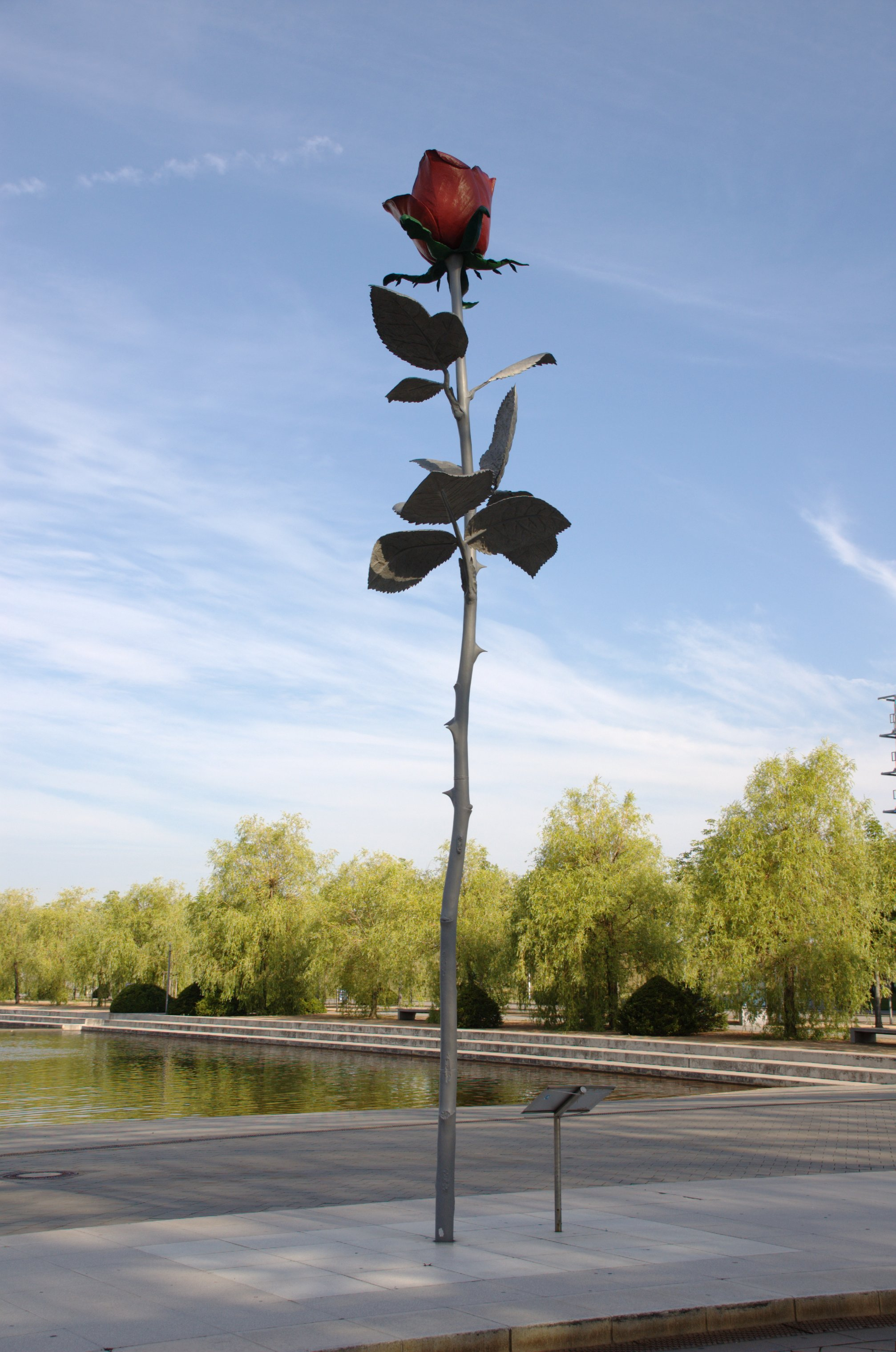
Rose (1993), in front of Leipziger Messe, Leipzig, Germany

One of Genzken's best known works, Rose (1993/7), is a public sculpture of a single long-stemmed rose made from enamelled stainless steel that towers eight metres above the Leipzig fairgrounds. The artist's first public artwork in the United States, her replica Rose II (2007) was installed outside the New Museum as part of a year-long rotating installation in November 2010.

Genzken has also produced numerous films, including Zwei Frauen im Gefecht, 1974, Chicago Drive, 1992, Meine Großeltern im Bayerischen Wald, 1992, and the video Empire/Vampire, Who Kills Death, 2003.

As an artist she published five portfolio styled books. Each including her expressive work, they can be purchased under David Zwirners Books website. Her books include Sculpture as a World Receiver, October Files, Isa Genzken: Retrospective, Isa Genzken: Oil, and Isa Genzken.

Untitled (2006) at the Hirshhorn Museum and Sculpture Garden in 2022

Since the end of the second half of the 1990s, Genzken has been conceptualizing sculptures and panel paintings in the shape of a bricolage of materials taken from DIY stores and from photographs and newspaper clippings. She often uses materials that underline the temporary character of her works. As part of her deep-set interest in urban space, she also arranges complex, and often disquieting, installations with mannequins, dolls, photographs, and an array of found objects. New Buildings for New York are assembled from found scraps of plastic, metal and pizza-box cardboard. The assemblages from the Empire/Vampire, Who Kills Death series, originally comprising more than twenty sculptures that were created following the attacks of September 11, are combinations of found objects – action figures, plastic vessels, and various elements of consumer detritus – arranged on pedestals in architecturally inspired, post-destruction scenes. Elefant (2006) is a column of cascading vertical blinds festooned with plastic tubes, foil, artificial flowers, fabric and some tiny toy soldiers and Indians. For her installation Oil, the artist transformed the German Pavilion at the 2007 Venice Biennale into a futuristic and morbid Gesamtkunstwerk.

Genzken worked frequently with Zwirner, who held her Paris New York Exhibition from August 29 to October 10, 2020. She had five solo exhibitions with him and this last one was her fifth. She has worked with him since 2010. The exhibition included Genzken's early work at the Kunstmuseum Basel. The installation of Genzken's recent "tower" sculptures. It was inspired by the artists decades-long fascination with architecture and urban skylines. She used multiple forms that include, vertical structures, of medium-density fiberboard with inclusion of a mirror foil, spray paint as well as other media.

=== Genzken's impact ===
Genzken's work has undoubtedly impacted art culture through her unique ability to create sculptures out of many materials such as wood, plaster, concrete, steel, epoxy resin, and even household kitchen materials, as seen in her "Babies" semblance from 1997. Genzken redefined the art of creating sculptures and even combated discrimination against sculpture art in the 60s and 70s as she pursued her unique talent. Simply put, her work has been seen as an attempt to encourage and broaden the art of sculpture without eliminating it. Genzken's art and media have always stayed true to the logic of her work, which continues to be contradictory, unpredictable, and in opposition throughout the sculpture. Her sculptures have even been recognized as art that creates illusions with the mind and opens the imagination of the viewer.

== Exhibitions ==
Genzken's first solo exhibition was held in 1976 at the Konrad Fischer Gallery in Düsseldorf, and her first exhibition with Galerie Buchholz was in 1986 in Cologne. From November 23, 2013, to March 10, 2014, "Isa Genzken: Retrospective" was on view at the Museum of Modern Art. The exhibition then traveled to the Museum of Contemporary Art Chicago, and Dallas Museum of Art.

== Collections ==
Genzken's work is included in the collections of many institutions internationally, including the Nationalgalerie, West Berlin; Staatsgalerie Stuttgart; Stedelijk Van Abbemuseum, Eindhoven; Rijksmuseum Kroller-Muller, Otterlo, the Museum of Modern Art, New York; Carnegie Museum of Art, Pittsburgh; the Generali Foundation, Vienna; the Hirshhorn Museum and Sculpture Garden, Washington, D.C.; the Kemper Art Museum, St. Louis; the Museum Ludwig, Cologne; the Museum Frieder Burda, Baden-Baden; the Van Abbemuseum, Eindhoven and the Stedelijk Museum, Amsterdam; Ruby City, Linda Pace Foundation, San Antonio, TX Rose III sculpture in Zuccotti Park, NYC.

== Recognition ==
She won the International Art Prize (Cultural Donation of SSK Munich) in 2004 and the Wolfgang-Hahn-Prize (Museum Ludwig, Cologne) in 2002.

== Gallery ==
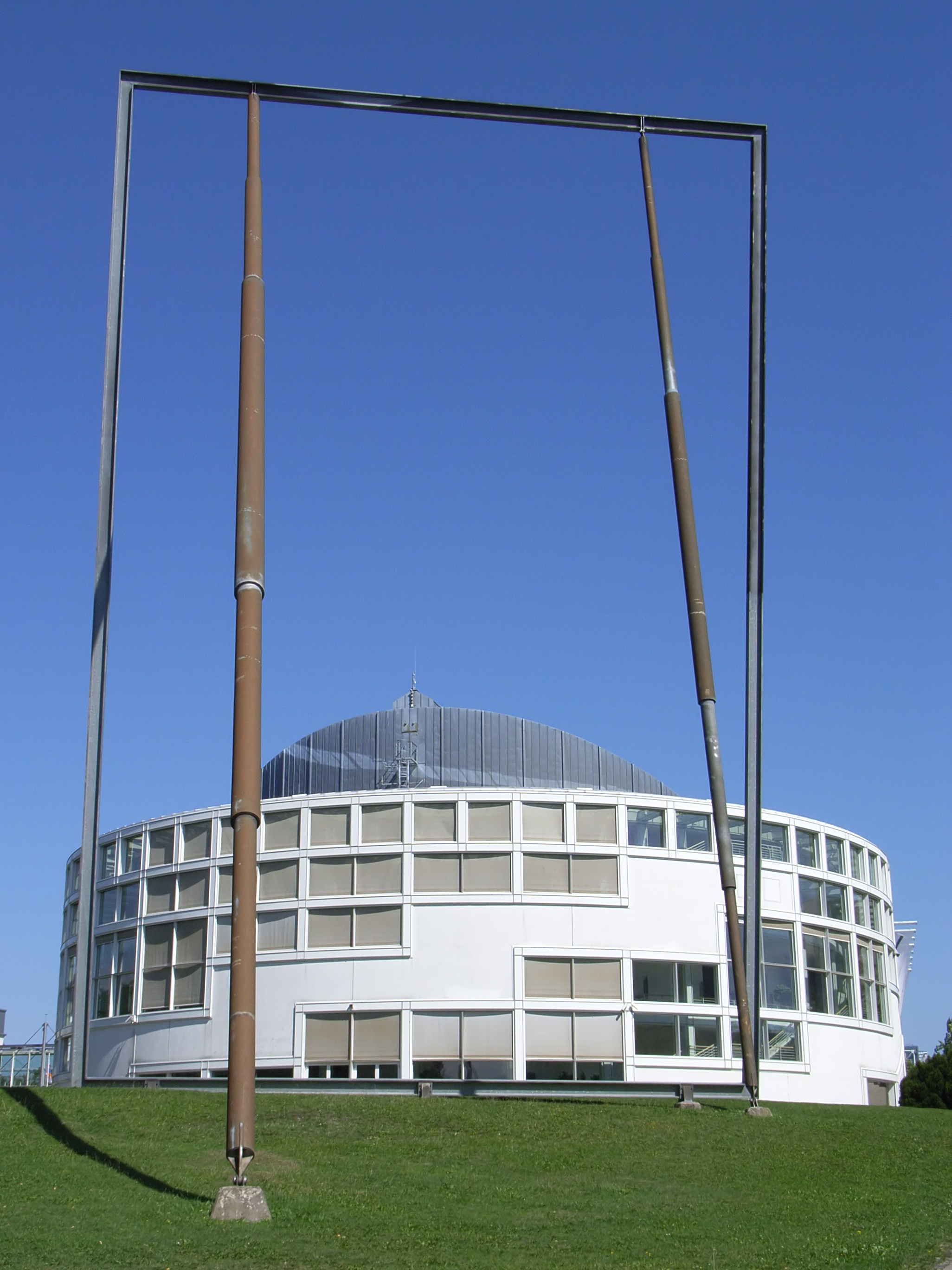
Spiegel (1991), installed in Bielefeld, Germany

== See also ==
- List of German women artists
