= Sabeth Buchmann =

Austrian art historian and art critic

Sabeth Buchmann is an art historian and art critic.

Currently Buchmann is Professor of Modern and Postmodern Art and the Head of the Institute for Art Theory and Cultural Studies at the Academy of Fine Arts Vienna. She contributes to books, magazines and catalogues. Buchmann's publications include Film, Avantgarde und Biopolitik (Academy of Fine Arts, Vienna, 2009) and Art After Conceptual Art (The MIT Press, 2006).
