= Cosima von Bonin =

German contemporary artist

- Born: Cosima Von Bonin; 1962 (age 63–64); Mombasa, Kenya
- Education: Hochschule für bildende Künste Hamburg
- Spouse: Michael Krebber

Cosima von Bonin (born 1962) is a German contemporary artist whose interdisciplinary practice includes sculpture, textiles, sound, film, and performance. She is known for being a political artist as well as by her humour, aquatic caricatures, and use of pop-culture characters, such as Daffy Duck.

== Early life and education ==
Cosima von Bonin was born in Mombasa, Kenya in 1962. She was raised in Austria.

Von Bonin studied at the Hochschule für Bildende Künste Hamburg (University of Fine Arts in Hamburg), where she studied under the tutelage of Martin Kippenberger and assistant Michael Krebber. Von Bonin said that she met many important figures while in college, including Friedrich Petzel, Jutta Koether, and Diedrich Diederischsen.

In 1989, von Bonin moved to Cologne. There, she worked at a bar, whilst also connecting with the writers Diedrich Diederichsen and Clara Drechsler, and artist Martin Kippenberger.

When von Bonin was still a student, she collaborated with Josef Strau in 1990, creating a work where von Bonin exhibited herself in a window display at a Hamburg showroom.

== Work ==
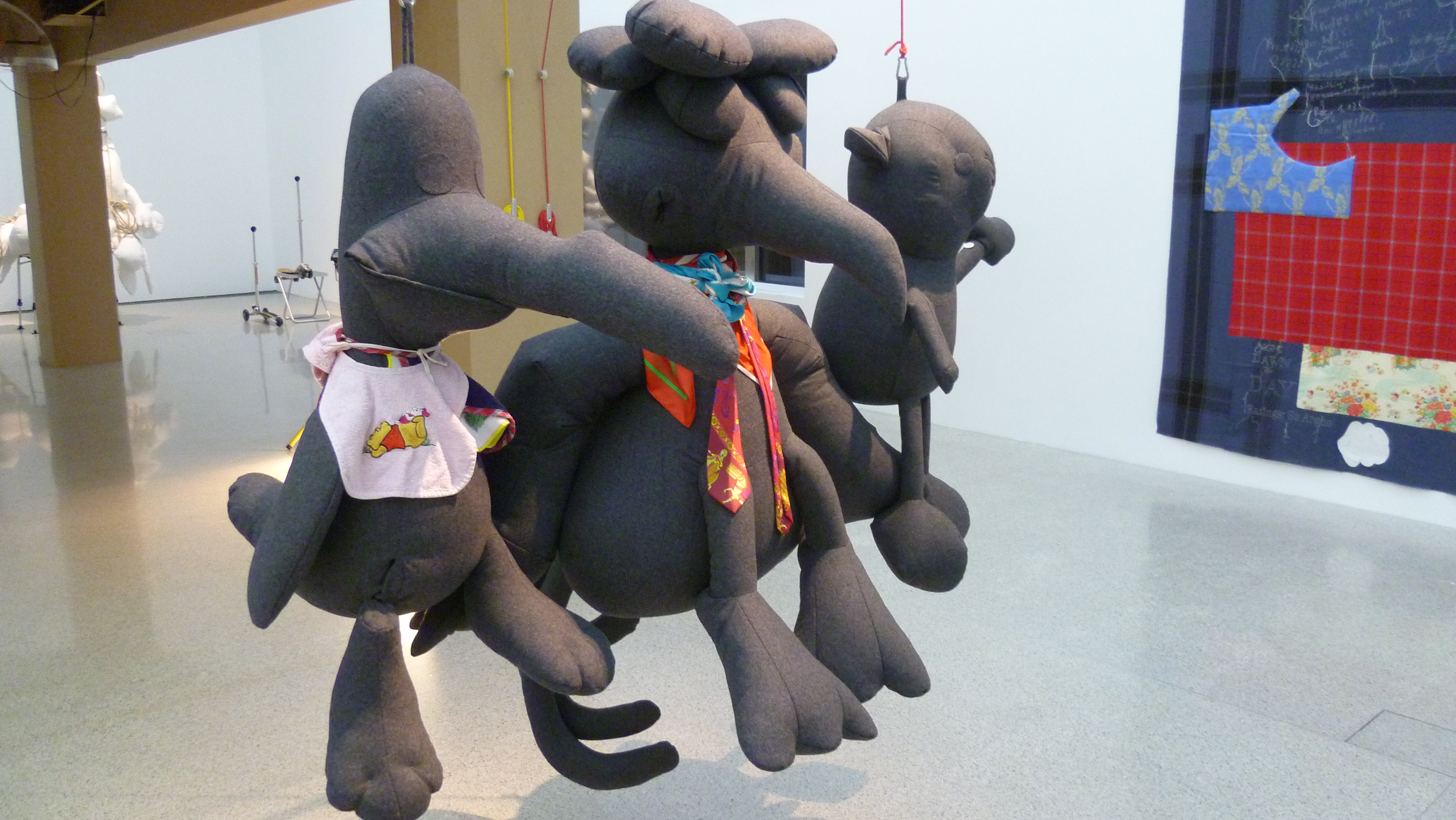
Exhibition at Mumok, Vienna 2014-2015

Von Bonin works across a variety of media, including sculpture (using plush toys, cardboard), sound, film, photography, and textiles (including tapestry). Von Bonin has also exhibited works across a variety of venues including at parties, DJ sets, music performances and audio and video exhibitions. She

Von Bonin's work explores the relationship between works of art and the world of fashion, music and architecture. She also draws inspiration from the intellectual, artistic, and musical culture of her neighbourhood in Cologne, where she lives and works. She has been described as bringing play and fun into her work.

Von Bonin often focuses on collective artistic production and works mainly in collaborations. She has collaborated with other artists including Dirk von Lowtzow, Michael Krebber, Mark von Schlegell, Kai Althoff, Sergej Jensen

Von Bonin does not explain the meaning of her works. She has also said that her work "has nothing to say, that there is nothing to learn from it." Art critics Jan Avgikos and Holly Myers, feel that understanding von Bonin’s works can be difficult or frustrating for this reason. She uses humor in her works. but art critics Nuit Banai and Jan Avgikos have argued that the employment of humor may be used to make her seem elusive. She has been called a political artist as well, especially when describing her work in her sixth solo exhibition, 'What if it Barks?'. Director of Raven Row, Alex Sainsbury, describes von Bonin's work as "anti-didactic and anti-authoritarian."

Her work has been compared to Sigmar Polke, Martin Kippenberger, and Rosemarie Trockel. Von Bonin has said that André Cadere, Marcel Broodthaers, Cady Noland, Mike Kelley, Isa Genzken, Poul Gernes and Martin Kippenberger influenced her.

== Career ==
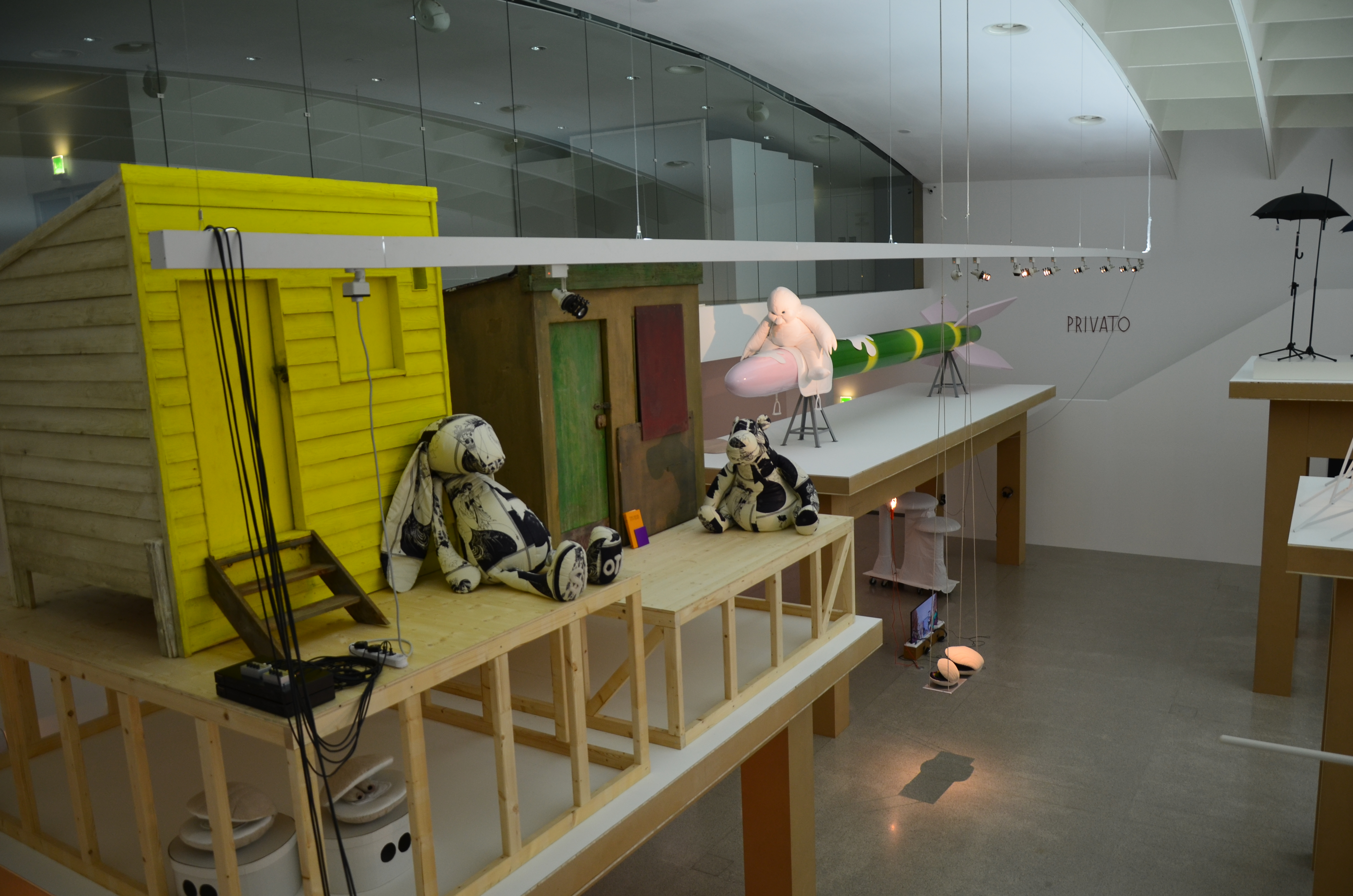
Exhibition at Mumok, Vienna 2014-2015

Von Bonin's 2016 - 2017 exhibition Who's Exploiting Who in the Deep Sea was her first solo museum exhibition in New York and Canada. The works within the exhibition consisted of textiles, music, sculpture, performance, video, and painting. One of the sculptures in this exhibition is a soft sculpture Total Produce (Morality) (2010), it is a large octopus with varying and colourful patterns sat upon a just as colourful raised platform that has lights underneath. Von Bonin had included past artworks from the 2000s displayed in this exhibition.

Von Bonin's first full-scale installation was in her exhibition 'What If It Barks?' in 2018 at Petzel Gallery, New York, her eighth show with the gallery. The theme was mostly aquatic except for a few works, such as a miniature hippopotamus inside of a cylindrical birdhouse titled HIPPO'S HOUSE (PROPERTY OF ARNOLD MOSSELMAN, THE HAGUE). The exhibition contained oversized cat tins that bellowed smoke, this can is called AUTHORITY PURÉE, there are wooden barrels with polyester shark heads poking out from the top and a plush plaid missile in its mouth, fish of varying sizes sporting clothes and ukuleles, and more. In the exhibition, von Bonin also presented a performative writing called a performative utterance.

In 2019, Von Bonin had her first solo exhibition in Mexico at House of Gaga, Mexico City. The exhibition contained a pink steel-wired cement mixer that held a drove of pink pig stuffed animals, four wooden canvases of Daffy Duck being enclosed and squashed by a black entity, an orange steel-wire cement mixer with dark blue lobster claws dangling and handcuffed to the barrel, and more. Von Bonin has been represented by the House of Gaga in Mexico City since 2019.

In 2025, von Bonin held an exhibition Upstairs Downstairs at Raven Row in London. The exhibition featured a selection of work spanning 35 years, from the early 1990s until 2025.

In 2026, von Bonin was commissioned to create plush whales, clams, crabs, and other sea creatures for the first runway show of Jack McCollough and Lazaro Hernandez for Loewe during Paris Fashion Week.

== Exhibitions ==
=== Solo ===
Year	Title	Institution	Location	Ref
2000	The Cousins	Braunschweig Art Association, Kunstverein Braunschweig	Braunschweig	
2007- 2008	Roger and Out	Museum of Contemporary Art	Los Angeles	
2010	The Fatigue Empire	Kunsthaus Bregenz	Austria	
2010 - 2011	The Lazy Susan	Witte de With Center for Contemporary Art	Rotterdam	
2011	The Lazy Susan	Arnolfini	Bristol	
2011	The Lazy Susan	Mamco	Geneva	
2011 - 2012	The Lazy Susan	Museum Ludwig	Cologne	
2011	Character Appropriation	Mildred Lane Kemper Art Museum	St. Louis	
2014 - 2015	Hippies Use the Side Door The Year 2014 Has Lost the Plot	Mumok	Vienna	
2016	Who's Exploiting Who in the Deep Sea	Glasgow International	Glasgow	
2016 - 2017	Who's Exploiting Who in the Deep Sea	SculptureCenter	Queens, New York	
2017	Who's Exploiting Who in the Deep Sea	Oakville Galleries	Oakville, Ontario	
2018	'What If It Barks?'	Petzel Gallery	New York	
2019	Shit and Chanel	House of Gaga	Mexico City	
2023	Boy at Work	Lumiar Cité	Lisbon	
2023 - 2024	WHAT IF THEY BARK?	High Line	New York	
2024	The Faker	Galerie Neu	Berlin	
2024	Feelings	Schirn Kunsthalle	Frankfurt	
2024 - 2025	Songs for Gay Dogs	MUDAM	Luxembourg	
2025	Upstairs Downstairs	Raven Row	London	

=== Group ===
Year	Title	Institution	Location	Ref
1995	First Graz Fan Fest			
1996	Glockengeschrei nach Deutz - das Beste aller Seiten (The Bell Screams Towards Deutz - the Best of all Sides)			
1997	Home Sweet Home	Deichtorhallen	Hamburg	
2007	Documenta 12			

== Public collections ==
Cosima von Bonin's art can be found in a number of public collections, including:

- Museum of Modern Art
- Stedelijk Museum Amsterdam
- Museum of Contemporary Art, Los Angeles
- Museum Ludwig, Cologne
- Sammlung der Bundesrepublik Deutschland, Hamburger Bahnhof, Berlin
- Staedelscher Museums-Verein, Frankfurt

== Personal life ==
Von Bonin lives in Cologne with her husband, Michael Krebber.

== See also ==
- List of German women artists
- Cosima von Bonin Curriculum Vitae
