= Gerhardsen Gerner =

Gerhardsen Gerner is a gallery for contemporary art located at Linienstrasse 85 in Berlin-Mitte. The gallery maintains a second space in Oslo, and is operated by gallery owners Atle Gerhardsen (*1964 in Oslo) and Nicolai Gerner-Mathisen (*1979 in Oslo).

The gallery was founded by Atle Gerhardsen in Oslo in 1995, under the name c/o. Atle Gerhardsen showed works by artists such as Tony Oursler, Matthew Ritchie and Carroll Dunham for the first time in Oslo. After moving to Berlin in 2000, Atle Gerhardsen opened the space in the railway arches near the Berlin Jannowitzbrücke station under the name c/o – Atle Gerhardsen in 2001. In early 2009, the gallery was renamed Gerhardsen Gerner in order to include the name of Atle Gerhardsen's business partner of many years, Nicolai Gerner-Mathisen. Atle Gerhardsen and Nicolai Gerner-Mathisen opened their premises in Oslo in the newly built district Tjuvholmen on 15 May 2012. In Oslo the gallery has shown exhibitions with artists such as Tal R, Julian Opie, Georg Herold, Olafur Eliasson or in March 2014 the group exhibition DO NOT DISTURB with the Scandinavian artist duo Elmgreen & Dragset.

After 15 years at Jannowitzbrücke the Berlin gallery moves in February 2016 to the new premises at Linienstrasse 85.

== Artists represented by Gerhardsen Gerner ==
- Amy Adler
- Nader Ahriman
- Per Inge Bjørlo
- Monica Bonvicini (Oslo)
- Edgar Bryan
- Carroll Dunham
- Olafur Eliasson (Oslo)
- Lothar Hempel
- Georg Herold (Oslo)
- Jim Lambie
- Shintaro Miyake
- Markus Oehlen
- Julian Opie
- Parra for Cuva (Records)
- Seth Pick
- Lari Pittman
- Magnus Plessen (Oslo)
- Ingegerd Råman
- Matthew Ritchie
- Thomas Ruff (Oslo)
- David Salle
- Andreas Slominski (Oslo)
- Dirk Stewen
- Annika Ström
- Trashlagoon (Records)
- Paloma Varga Weisz (Oslo)
- James White
- Andrea Winkler

== Artfairs ==
- Art Basel, Basel
- Gallery Weekend Berlin
- Art Basel, Hong Kong
