= Propellerfrau =

1969 painting by Sigmar Polke

Propellerfrau (also "Untitled – oil on curtain")
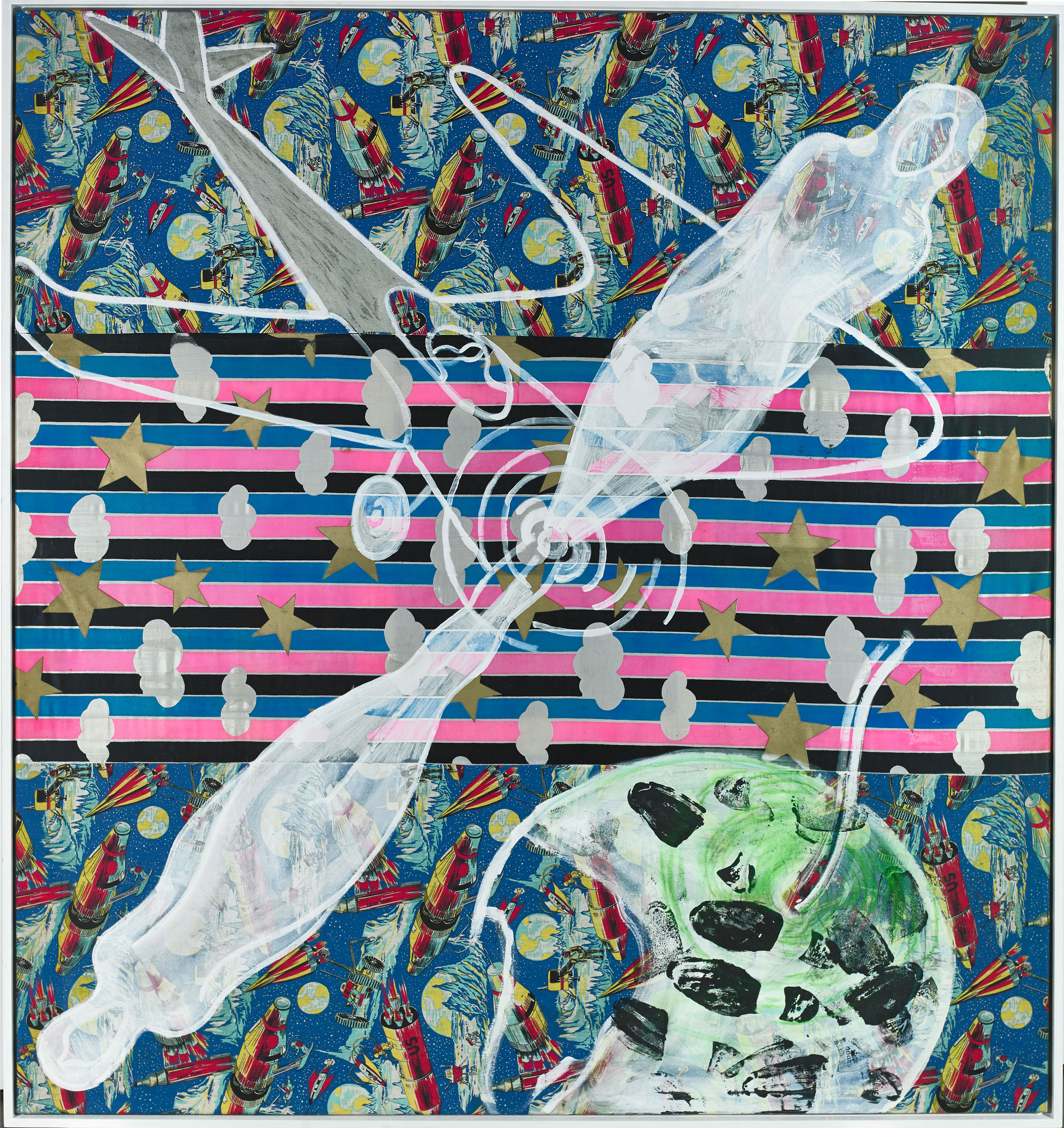
- Artist: Sigmar Polke
- Year: 1969
- Medium: Oil on curtain material
- Subject: Space Race between the USA and USSR at the end of the 1960s
- Dimensions: 185 cm × 198 cm (73 in × 78 in)
- Location: Museum Trésor des Templiers, Rorschacherberg

Propellerfrau is an oil on curtain material painting by Sigmar Polke which was completed in 1969.

== History ==
This painting was first exhibited in the Stedelijk Museum in Amsterdam in 1992. In 2007, Polke sold the painting to a friendly art director from Cologne. After Polke's death in 2010, the heirs of Polke sued the ostensible buyer, claiming the painting had been stolen. The Landgericht Köln (high court in Cologne) decided in 2014 that the 2007 sale of the work was valid and required the heirs to return the work to the buyer. In 2018, the painting was added to the collection of Museum Trésor des Templiers in Rorschacherberg, Switzerland.

== Analysis ==
The painting was realized by Polke with oil on curtain fabric. It shows his interpretation of the Space Race in the 1960s between the Soviet Union and the United States.

== Literature ==
- Stedelijk Museum (Amsterdam). Sigmar Polke : exhibition, 25 September–29 November 1992. In: Stedelijk Museum Amsterdam catalogus; 770, ISBN 90-5006-077-3.
