= Annika Ström =

Artist from Sweden

Annika Ström (born 9 November 1964) is a Swedish artist, living and working in London, United Kingdom. Ström works mainly with performance art, text, films (video art) and sound. Her work addresses subjective states of crisis and insecurity in songs, videos and text pieces displaying self-reflective phrases like "Excuse me I am sorry, Everything in this show can be used against me, I am a better artist than I deserve". In her films Ström draws upon details of everyday life and seemingly insignificant experiences usually accompanied by her own low-fi synth-pop soundtracks. She often works with members of her family. Her films explore the subjects of failure, loss and disappearance. Ström's text works consist of phrases, normally no more than a few words, transcribed onto sheets of paper or, onto a wall. Her videos, songs and text works are structured around the poetic transfiguration of the ordinary. Her work has been featured in many international exhibitions such as Palais de Tokyo, Whitsable Biennale.

== Studies in Copenhagen ==
Ström studied at the Royal Danish Academy of Fine Arts Copenhagen between 1991 and 1997. During her second year, 1993, she moved to Berlin and commuted to school. She remained in Berlin until she moved to the UK in 2005.

== First performance work ==
Ström's first performance took place in 1995 with Anna Ström & Annika Ström at the Rupert Goldsworthy gallery space in Prenzlauerberg in Berlin. Her mother, Anna, was invited to work in the gallery, making portraits of her daughter over three days, which her mother then sold. Anna had not made a drawing for 43 years.

Since the appearance of Anna Ström in her very first public work, Anna Ström has appeared in many of her films. In Collector Anna shows her collection of Annika's early art school nude studies, as if they were old masterpieces. In 2008 Anna Ström developed severe Alzheimers which Ström depicted in I can hardly recognize myself , and the super8 films; Crystal Brain and Sunshine Head.

== Film and soundtrack ==
In 1995 Ström did her first long-form video, Windowpillow- a Berlin habit , about the East Berliner practice of leaning out of their windows, while resting their arms on pillows. The work included both film and pillows and was first shown at Saga Basement, an artist's run space. Having just graduated, this film contributed to her having her first solo show at Casey Kaplan gallery in New York 1997. From 1995 Ström began to do her own film soundtracks. Using only a simple keyboard she scored for, Summer 96, The Artist Live, The Artist musical, Ten New Love Songs, Six Songs For A Time Like This and 16 Minutes. In many of these films she acts out different characters, best known perhaps is Swedish Traveller (3 min 95) and performing the art songs in Artist Musical (13 min 96). Ström has made over 35 films. In 2013 she directed the short film “The Swede” featuring Gunnel Lindblom and Carina Westling.

== Performing the soundtrack ==
With these films Ström began to perform her soundtracks live and as the songs were short so were the concerts, and many missed the concerts, this resulted in the film The Missed Concert . The Missed Concert is part of what Ström calls her “Absent Films” including, After Film Trailer and Been in Video, exploring the subjects of failure and disappearance. She has published three vinyl records relating to the soundtrack to the films Summer96, The Artist Live and Ten New Love Songs.

== Performance work ==
In 2010 Ström staged a performance at the London Frieze art fair where ten identically dressed men walked around together at the fair looking embarrassed. The caused of the embarrassment was the low number of work produced by women artists that are represented at commercial art fairs. This work gained much press attention. The work was followed by a series of other performances such as "The Upset Man" 2010 and "The Inpet Five", 2011. Another ongoing performance is the "Seven Women Standing In The Way" where seven women in their 60s gently block the entrance of an art space, by talking, drinking and being oblivious to other visitor's attempts to enter the space. The performance work "Look the other Way" at Winchester Great Hall and Shanty Clash' were commissioned in 2013 by artSouth collaboration. Six Lovely People took place at Fig2 at Ica, London 2015 and Six Errands included 29 performers at The Gallery in Leicester acting out five performance work simultaneously.

== Text work ==
Since 2000 Ström has also worked extensively with text phrases, painted on both paper and canvas, of which many are in private and public collections. In 2014 the Swedish Art Agency commissioned her to do 10 texts works for the new build extension of LUX, the Humanities Department at Lund University. On the roof of the building a 10 meter long text in metal it says; "men vänta nu". (Direct English translation is; "but wait now " meaning, “hold on”). The work is permanent.

== Teaching ==
Ström held a part-time professorship at The Academy of Fine Art Oslo 2009–2010. There she created several workshops with titles such as Mamma or Pappa, How to Change the Situation by Statistical Information! A workshop about the representation of women artist at public museums. The statistics were then read by Ströms father in the film, Ragnar Ström Reading Statistics in his Garden 2009. In the film, Ragnar, a former history teacher is reading statistics relating to his daughter profession in a dry, accusing manner. Another workshop Excuse me, I have to go the rest room, took place in public toilets around Oslo, as spaces for displaying art. "From January 2017 to May 2018 she was a senior lecturer at Academy of fine Arts in Umeå, Sweden. She had held workshops and talks at several universities in Europe, among them; Munich Academy of Fine Art, University of Arts Linz, Staffordshire University & Imperial College London.

== Public collections ==
Her work is in international collections such as Moderna Museet, Stockholm. Malmö Art Museum Malmö. Statens Museum for Kunst, Copenhagen. NBK, Neuer Berliner Kunstverein, Berlin. Wiener Secession, Vienna. Museum of Contemporary Art, Belgrade. Migros Museum Zürich. Le CNAP, National Center of Visual Arts, France. CCAC, Centro de Andaluz de Arte Contemporaneo, Seville. Sammlung Verbund, Vienna. Palais de Tokyo, Paris. Göteborgs Konstmuseum, Göteborg, Sweden, Trondheim Kunstmuseum, Trondheim, Norway.

== Gallery representation ==
Ström has been worked with numerous commercial galleries. Solo exhibitions of her work were held at Rupert Goldsworthy, Berlin (1995, 1996); Casey Kaplan, New York (1997, 1998, 2003); Galleri Charlotte Lund, Stockholm (2002, 2005, 2010); Gerhardsen Gerner, Berlin (1999, 2000, 2001, 2005, 2008, 2012); Galleri Drantmann, Brussels (2003); Mary Goldman Gallery, Los Angeles (2000, 2004); Lautom Gallery, Oslo (2008); Sonia Rosso, Pordenone and Turin (1999, 2010).

== Monographs ==
- Annika Ström, Secession, Vienna, 1999
- Annika Ström: Manuscript Song, Galleria Sonia Rosso, Pordenone, 2000
- Annika Ström: Call for a Demonstration, Onestar press, France 2005
- Annika Ström, Texts by Annika Ström, Onestar press. 2007
- Annika Ström Live!, edited & designed by Christophe Boutin/Onestar press/Fälth&Hässler 2008
- Men Vänta Nu, The Public Art Agency of Sweden 2014
- Six Errands, The Gallery / De Montford University 2019
