= Lothar Hempel =

German artist based in Berlin (born 1966)

Lothar Hempel (born 1966 in Cologne) is a German artist based in Berlin. He attended Kunstakademie Düsseldorf from 1987 to 1992.

== Artistic practice ==
Hempel transforms the exhibition space into a stage on which the visitor becomes an actor in a story full of cross-references and contradictions. The works are at once the synopsis, the set, the characters and the props of a play. They represent the different parts of a narrative created out of references to German history, psychology, Greek tragedy, cinema, music, political and social history, neurology, and modern dance, for instance..

Hempel borrows a number of different styles and strategies, whether invented by Dada, Constructivism, the Bauhaus or Joseph Beuys. He uses visual metaphors by incorporating images or found objects.

== Exhibition history ==
In 2007 Hempel's work was the subject of the retrospective exhibition 'Alphabet City' curated by Florence Derieux at Le Magasin, Grenoble. Museum exhibitions include Casanova, The Douglas Hyde Gallery, Dublin (2008); Concentrations 42, Dallas Museum of Art, Dallas (2002), and Propaganda, Institute of Contemporary Arts, London (2002). Lothar Hempel's work has been included in the exhibitions Heaven, Athens Biennale (2009), Le Song D’un Poete, Frac des Pays de la Loire, Nantes (2009); Beaufort 03, Triennial for Contemporary Art, Blankenberge (2009); 7th Gwangju Biennial (2008); Pale Carnage, Arnolfini, Bristol and DCA, Dundee (2007); Imagination becomes Reality. Werke aus der Sammlung Goetz, ZKM – Museum für Neue Kunst, Karlsruhe (2007).

Hempel has exhibited regularly since 1991, during which time his work has been seen in exhibitions at art institutions, among them: the Venice Biennale; Tate Liverpool, ICA, London; Stedelijk Museum, Amsterdam; MoMA PS1, New York; Museum of Contemporary Art, Chicago; Portikus, Frankfurt am Main; Secession, Vienna; Centre Georges Pompidou, Paris.

Solo Exhibitions

2018

- Le Terrain Vague, Modern Art, London
- Koexistenz, Window on Broad project space, Rosenwald-Wolf Gallery, University of the Arts, Philadelphia, PA, USA
- Gargoyle, Italic, Berlin, Germany

2017

- Oral Heart, Anton Kern Gallery, New York, NY, USA
- FUTURE MUSIC, Casado Santapau, Madrid, Spain

2016

- Working Girl, Sies + Höke, Düsseldorf, Germany
- Sex and the City, Art : Concept, Paris, France

2015

- Tropenkoller, Modern Art, London

2014

- PEOPLE LIKE YOU MAKE IT EASY, Anton Kern Gallery, New York, NY, USA
- Luggage and Observations, Galerie Klaus Gerrit Friese, Stuttgart, Germany

2013

- Loneliness is a cloak you wear, a deep shade of blue is always there, Gerhardsen Gerner, Berlin, Germany
- Songs for the Blind, Hezi Cohen Gallery, Tel Aviv, Israel
- Art Basel Parcours, Museum Kleines Klingental, Basel, Switzerland

2012

- The Story of the Old New Girls, Art : Concept, Paris, France
- Opium, La Conservera, Ceuti, Spain

2011

- Suedehead, Anton Kern Gallery, New York, NY, USA

2010

- Silberblick / Squint, Modern Art, London
- ZOO, Sadler's Wells, London
- Pyramix Pix, c/o – Gerhardsen Gerner, Berlin, Germany

2009

- Kats, Nerves, Shadows & Gin, Anton Kern Gallery, New York, NY, USA
- Rise and Fall, MGM, Oslo, Norway
- Cafe Kaputt, Gio Marconi, Milan, Italy

2008

- Casanova & Other Problems, Modern Art, London
- Casanova, Douglas Hyde Gallery, Dublin, Ireland
- Signal, Art : Concept, Paris, France

2007

- Alphabet City, Magasin – Centre National d’Art Contemporain, Grenoble, France
- Modern Art, London
- Effetti Speciali, Atle Gerhardsen, Berlin, Germany

2006

- Vanessa Baird - Me, myself and the other one, Atle Gerhardsen, Berlin, Germany
- Umbrella, Anton Kern Gallery, New York, NY, USA
- Tarantella, Bar Ornella, Cologne, Germany

2005

- Casa Musica (extrema), Atle Gerhardsen, Berlin, Germany
- Butterfly, c/o Alte Gerhardsen, Art Nova, Art Basel Miami Beach, Miami, FL, USA

2004

- Fieber/Fever: 5 New Paintings and Other Stories, Anton Kern Gallery, New York, NY, USA
- Ikarus, Art : Concept, Paris, France
- On The Olympus, Unlimited Contemporary Art, Athens, Greece
- Versteck!, with Petra Hollenbach, Parkhaus, Düsseldorf, Germany

2003

- Der Gesang der Vögel ist Sinnlos!, The Song of the Bird is Nonsense, Anton Kern Gallery, New York, NY, USA

2002

- Diamanten, c/o Atle Gerhardsen, Berlin, Germany
- Fleisch: Maschine, Magnani, London
- Concentrations 42, Dallas Museum of Art, Dallas, TX, USA
- Propaganda, Institute of Contemporary Arts, London
- Wespennest, Dallas Museum of Art, Dallas, TX, USA

2001

- Magnet, Art : Concept, Paris, France

2000

- Das Orakel l’chelt. das Orakel lacht. das Orakel l’chelt, Ars Futura Galerie, Zurich, Switzerland
- An Schlaf ist Nicht zu Denken, Lab of Gravity, Hamburg, Germany
- Wespennest (Wasps Nest) Anton Kern Gallery, New York, NY, USA

1999

- Amerika Verschwindet nur das L’cheln Bleibt (America Disappears Only the Smile Remains), Anton Kern Gallery, New York, NY, USA
- KAPUTT und die Folgen (Kaputt and the Consequences), Robert Prime, London
- Videos, Centre Saint Gervais, Geneva, Switzerland

1998

- Ein Sandstrand voll Glas (A Beach Full of Glass), Galerie Daniel Buchholz, Cologne, Germany
- Kunstschnee will Schmelzen, Bureau Amsterdam, Stedelijk Museum, Amsterdam, Netherlands

1997

- Samstag Morgen, Zuckersumpf, Robert Prime, London
- This Bittersweet Disaster, Anton Kern Gallery, New York, NY, USA

1996

- Strom, Anton Kern Gallery, New York, NY, USA
- The Bienenkorb Times, Galerie Daniel Buchholz, Cologne, Germany
- FRAC Languedoc Roussillon, Montpellier, France

1994

- LOW, Artistbooth, Cologne Art Fair, Cologne, Germany
- LA BOUM, with Thorsten Slama, New Reality Mix, Stockholm, Sweden2007
- Alphabet City, Magasin – Centre National d’Art Contemporain, Grenoble, France
- Modern Art, London
- Effetti Speciali, Atle Gerhardsen, Berlin, Germany

2006

- Vanessa Baird - Me, myself and the other one, Atle Gerhardsen, Berlin, Germany
- Umbrella, Anton Kern Gallery, New York, NY, USA
- Tarantella, Bar Ornella, Cologne, Germany

2005

- Casa Musica (extrema), Atle Gerhardsen, Berlin, Germany
- Butterfly, c/o Alte Gerhardsen, Art Nova, Art Basel Miami Beach, Miami, FL, USA

2004

- Fieber/Fever: 5 New Paintings and Other Stories, Anton Kern Gallery, New York, NY, USA
- Ikarus, Art : Concept, Paris, France
- On The Olympus, Unlimited Contemporary Art, Athens, Greece
- Versteck!, with Petra Hollenbach, Parkhaus, Düsseldorf, Germany

2003

- Der Gesang der Vögel ist Sinnlos!, The Song of the Bird is Nonsense, Anton Kern Gallery, New York, NY, USA

2002

- Diamanten, c/o Atle Gerhardsen, Berlin, Germany
- Fleisch: Maschine, Magnani, London
- Concentrations 42, Dallas Museum of Art, Dallas, TX, USA
- Propaganda, Institute of Contemporary Arts, London
- Wespennest, Dallas Museum of Art, Dallas, TX, USA

2001

- Magnet, Art : Concept, Paris, France

2000

- Das Orakel l’chelt. das Orakel lacht. das Orakel l’chelt, Ars Futura Galerie, Zurich, Switzerland
- An Schlaf ist Nicht zu Denken, Lab of Gravity, Hamburg, Germany
- Wespennest (Wasps Nest) Anton Kern Gallery, New York, NY, USA

1999

- Amerika Verschwindet nur das L’cheln Bleibt (America Disappears Only the Smile Remains), Anton Kern Gallery, New York, NY, USA
- KAPUTT und die Folgen (Kaputt and the Consequences), Robert Prime, London
- Videos, Centre Saint Gervais, Geneva, Switzerland

1998

- Ein Sandstrand voll Glas (A Beach Full of Glass), Galerie Daniel Buchholz, Cologne, Germany
- Kunstschnee will Schmelzen, Bureau Amsterdam, Stedelijk Museum, Amsterdam, Netherlands

1997

- Samstag Morgen, Zuckersumpf, Robert Prime, London
- This Bittersweet Disaster, Anton Kern Gallery, New York, NY, USA

1996

- Strom, Anton Kern Gallery, New York, NY, USA
- The Bienenkorb Times, Galerie Daniel Buchholz, Cologne, Germany
- FRAC Languedoc Roussillon, Montpellier, France

1994

- LOW, Artistbooth, Cologne Art Fair, Cologne, Germany
- LA BOUM, with Thorsten Slama, New Reality Mix, Stockholm, Sweden
- OMRON: six videos by Lothar Hempel, Preview Theatre Wardour Street, London
- Bewegungslehre (No Future), Buchholz und Buchholz, Cologne, Germany

1992

- 240 Minuten, with George Graw, Galerie Esther Schipper, Cologne, Germany

== Galleries ==
Lothar Hempel is represented by Art:Concept, Paris; Giò Marconi Gallery, Milan; Gerhardsen Gerner, Berlin/Oslo; Anton Kern Gallery, New York; Stuart Shave/Modern Art, London, and Casado Santapau Gallery, Madrid.

== Selected Collections ==
Astrup Fearnley Museum of Modern Art, Oslo, Norway

David Roberts Art Foundation, London

Centre national des arts plastiques, Paris, France

Fondazione Morra Greco, Naples, Italy

Fondazione Sandretto Re Rebaudengo, Turin, Italy

FRAC Champagne-Ardenne, Reims, France

FRAC Limousin, Limoges, France

FRAC des Pays de la Loire, Carquefou, France

Galerie für Zeitgenössische Kunst GfZK, Leipzig, Germany

Honart Museum / Ebrahim Melamed Collection, Tehran, Iran

Museum of Contemporary Art, Los Angeles, CA, USA

Museum of Modern Art, New York, NY, USA

Sammlung Goetz, Munich, Germany

The Saatchi Gallery, London

Zabludowicz Collection, London
