= Georg Herold =

German painter

- Born: 1947 (age 78–79); Jena, Germany
- Education: Woodbury University, Art Center College of Design
- Known for: sculpture, painting, installation, photography and video art
- Notable work: Untitled, (1991); Künstlerische Medizin, Patho-Ontologie (Cabinet patho-psychologique) (1995); There is nothing left—There is no right, (1992); Delivering the WOW, (2005); Figur I-V (2007)
- Movement: Contemporary art
- Awards: Günter Fruhtrunk Prize of the Academy of Fine Arts; 1998

Georg Herold (born 1947) is a German artist. He works in sculpture, installation, painting, photography, and video art. He lives and works in Cologne, Germany.

== Early life and education ==
Herold finalized a traineeship as an artist blacksmith and attended the University of Art and Design Halle (Halle, Germany) from 1969 to 1973. In 1974, Herold left the German Democratic Republic, went to Munich and attended the Academy of Fine Arts (1974–76). Herold left Munich and went to Hamburg where, under the mentoring of Sigmar Polke, he has graduated the University of Fine Arts.

While studying under the guidance of Sigmar Polke (1977-1981) and Franz Erhard Walther at the University of Fine Arts of Hamburg, Herold met Günther Förg, Martin Kippenberger, Albert Oehlen and Werner Büttner. They formed a tight knit group of "provocateurs", the "bad boy group" (enfants terribles), known for embracing the punk attitude and rebelling in the anarchic spirit of the late 1970s.

== Work ==
Between the 80s and 90s, Herold's work was influenced by Albrecht Dürer's, whose Hare (1502) was created using roofing slats. Herold was also influenced by the Dada movement, whose specifics are found in his bizarre and subversive works that refer to the consumerist society. Some of Herold's works are often "allusional" and "quirky and provocative as "Dada"". An example is Herold's Herrenperspektive (Men's Perspective), (2002). The ironic tendency of Herold's works which leave room for interpretation, juxtaposed to the fact that he uses commonly found objects to create his artwork, influenced his style towards Marcel Duchamp's approach. Since 1980, DOCUMENTA IX has been hosting Herold's artworks, including There is nothing left—There is no right (1992)

Herold uses non-traditional mediums, lower grade everyday materials that are not commonly used in art. These include construction materials like bricks, mattresses, nails, socks, buttons, paper scraps and copper making Herold's work to be associated sometimes with Arte Povera. He also uses eclectic household and food items, like tights, aged cheese, tea strainers, photos, and various plants, thus, transforming the role of canvas by changing it into a support that outspreads "from the frame into the picture".

One of the examples of the nontraditional art materials that Herold uses may be his caviar paintings. As Herold smears caviar across the surface of the canvas, he transmutes the value and connotation into something invested rather than wasted. Herold, through his frequently ironic critical works, makes an allusion to figures of authority, the art market, their artistic predecessors, and the prevailing culture questioning the whole purpose of art and even its context in the world at large.

A sculpture composed of metal wire and wood, Genetischer Eingriff in die Erbmasse bei Frau Herold (n.n. tr. The Genetic Alteration of Mrs. Herolds DNA) (1985) depicts a DNA double-helix constructed from wire that descends from thin air to a wooden base. As it approaches the base, chunks of board wood of various lengths seem to interact with, interrupt, and distort the DNA strand at random.

Herold's large canvas Untitled (1991) displays four dark, spiraling patterns made of Beluga caviar. The spirals resemble DNA molecules, and each caviar egg is painstakingly numbered.

In Künstlerische Medizin, Patho-Ontologie (Cabinet patho-psychologique) (1995), Herold presents a collection of glass bottles and jars, each one labeled in a way that at a glance seems scientific and legitimate. Closer inspection reveals the label texts to be pseudoscientific and satirical.

Punning on the political left and right wings, There is Nothing Left, There is No Right (1992) consists of two doors, each painted a neutral gray. One of them is marked "There is nothing left," the other emblazoned "There is no right." Viewers are invited to choose.

Delivering the WOW (2005) is a plain linen canvas, from which protrude several unremarkable stacks of bricks, joined from end to end with white cement to create tall, narrow towers three bricks high.

With his sculpture series, Figur I-V (2007), Herold presents five surrealistic human figures composed of canvas stretched over lengths of timber tinted in solid primary colors with glossy car paint. Slender and angular, long-limbed and lacking facial features, these figures are contorted into arresting body positions, as if in extreme pain or ecstasy.

For Members Only depicts a big cardboard box with "For Members Only" written on the side. The setpiece is on a pedestal referring to the title of the work.

Since 1989, Herold has been creating abstract figures made of Beluga caviar, a sort of abstract expressionism like the Untitled series (1991-). He also portrayed different personalities like Mike Tyson, Bertrand Russell, Lionel Richie, William Burroughs, Sean Penn, Barry White, Charles de Gaulle, Mark Lombardi and, he even has counted the number of fish eggs used for creating some of his caviar paintings.

Herold's sculpturing style is accepted as minimalism or Neo-Dada minimalism by art critiques, galleries and journalists. Herold's sculpted figures often are slightly distorted, filiforms, stretched to the point of breaking, often reaching towards something, pushing their body postures, while trapped in an unbearable state. Some of Herold's works include: G.O.E.L.R.O (1988), Hospitalismus (1989), The Bow (1989), Untitled (1990), Resteuropa (Rest of Europe) (1998), Rumsfeld (2004), Red Square (2005), Platz des himmlischen Friedens (2005), Lost in Tolerance (2006), Flamingo (2007). All these artworks are sculptures or installations made of bricks, canvas, laths, color lacquer and screws.

In 1989 The New York Times reviewer found the figurative paintings of Herold, Martin Kippenberger and Rosemarie Trockel exhibited at the Solomon R. Guggenheim Museum making "little sense in a pictorial context" while in 1990, on the occasion of a group exhibition held at the Tony Shafrazi Gallery, another The New York Times reviewer found Herold's caviar paintings "seminal and astral". In 2012 took place a New Art Dealers Alliance fair in Chelsea where Herold exhibited a 1989 caviar painting and an artwork made of bricks.

=== Film ===
Herold played in Martin Kippenberger und Co – Ein Dokument. "Ich kann mir nicht jeden Tag ein Ohr abschneiden." (Martin Kippenberger and Co – A Document. "I can not cut my ears every day".), a 25-minute documentary, along with Albert Oehlen, Markus Oehlen, Werner Büttner, Hans Peter Adamski, Peter Bommels and Volker Tannert. The documentary was produced and directed by Jacqueline Kaess-Farquet. The Frankfurter Allgemeine Zeitung (Frankfurt General Newspaper) reviewer found that the artists had "ironic or even a bit of a bourgeois appearance".

=== Teaching ===
Besides his artistic career, Georg Herold is also a professor at the Kunstakademie Düsseldorf in Düsseldorf. Between 1993–1999 Herold was a professor at the College of Fine Arts in Frankfurt.

== Exhibitions ==
Herold has exhibited his artwork in museums and galleries across the US and Europe. These include: MoMA (New York), Gerhardsen Gerner (Oslo, Norway), Galerie Bärbel Grässlin (Frankfurt, Germany), Sadie Coles HQ Gallery (London, UK), Gabriele Senn Galerie (Vienna, Austria), Galerie Max Hetzler (Berlin, Germany), Sabine Knust Galerie & Maximilianverlag (Munich, Germany), Brooke Alexander Gallery (New York), Villa Arson Gallery (Nice, France), Air de Paris Gallery (Nice) et cetera.

== Gallery ==
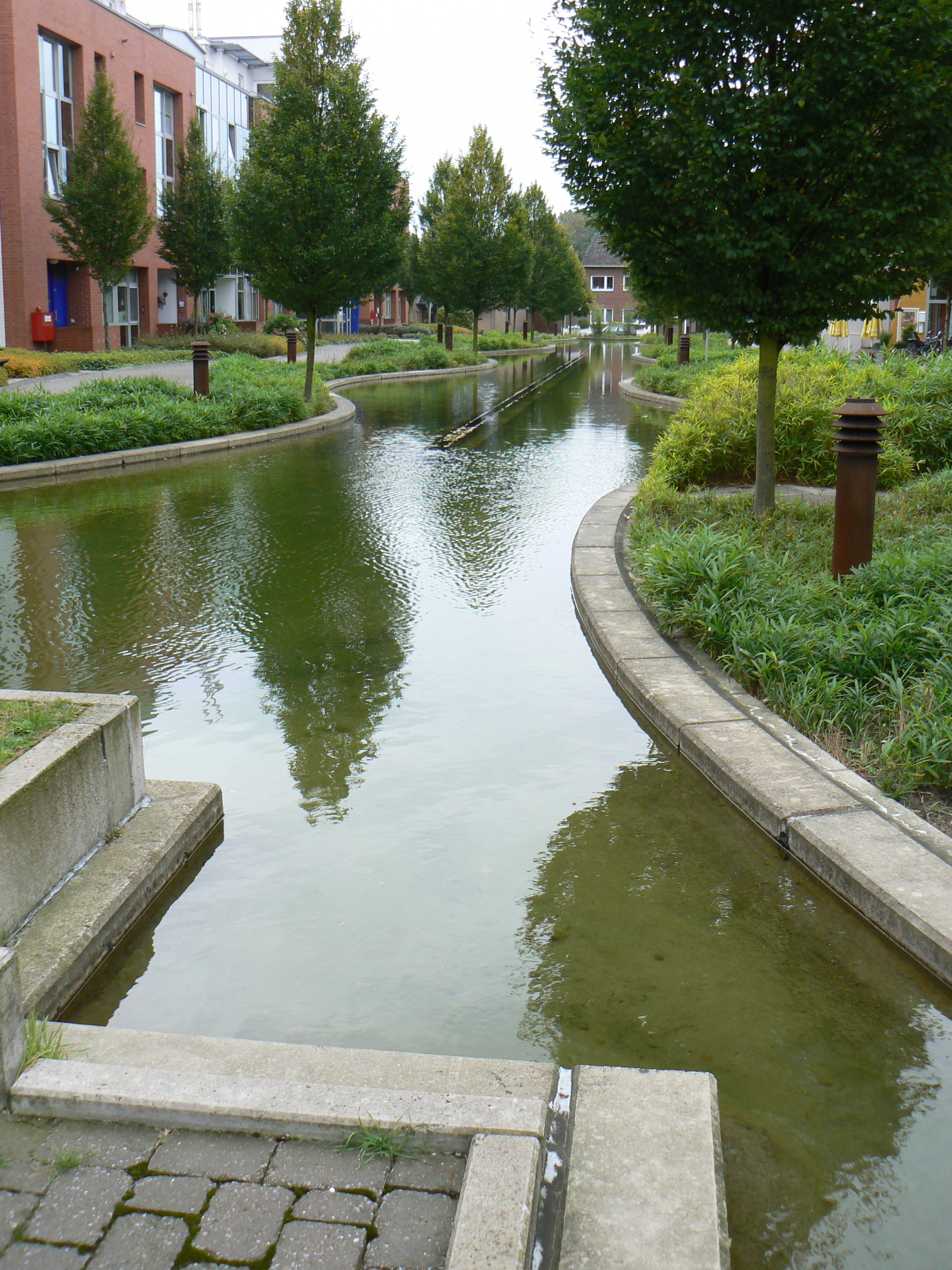
Liquid relief/light relief, 1997
