= Peter Pakesch =

Austrian exhibition curator, museum director and foundation director

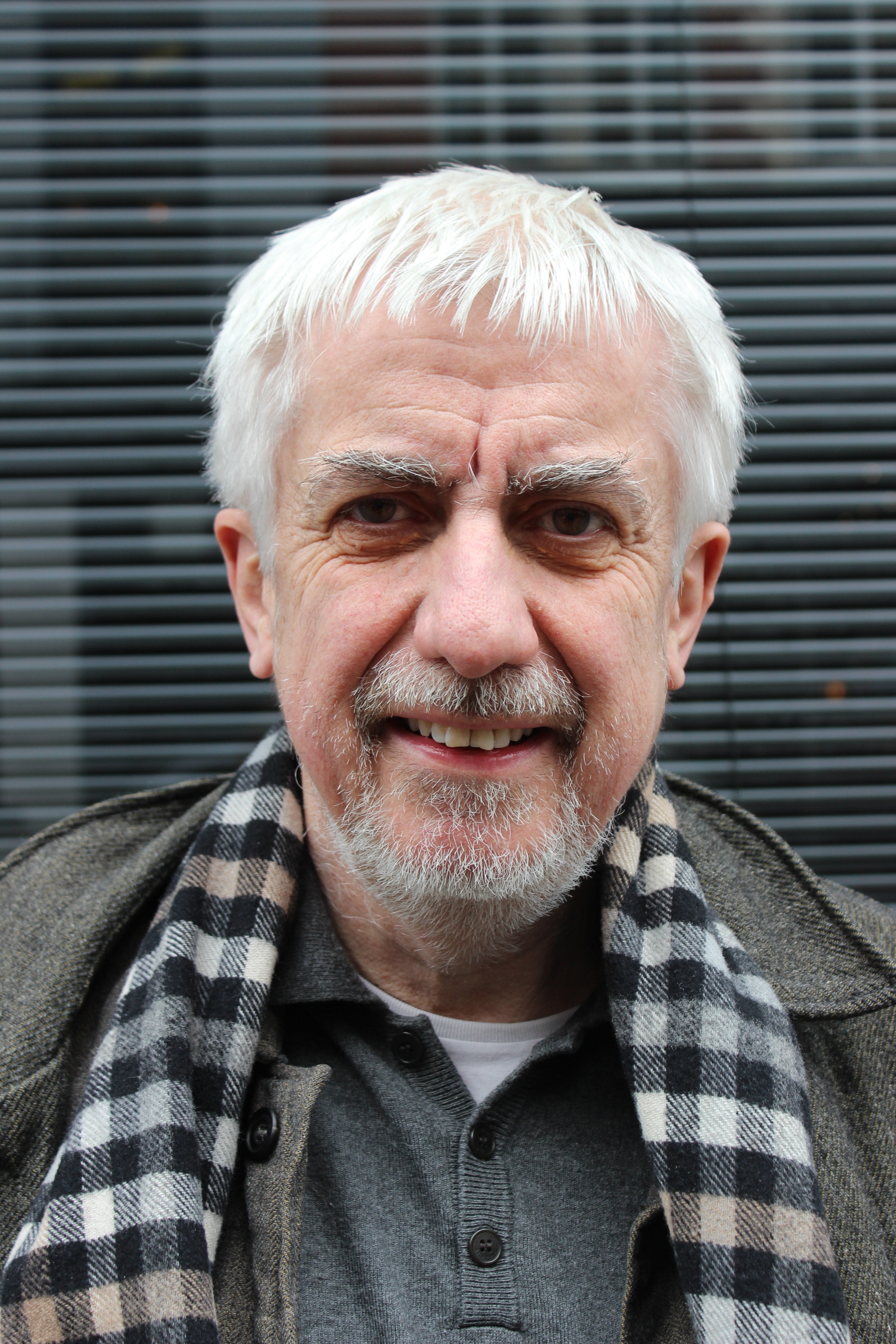
- Born: 16th of July, 1955
- Education: Akademisches Gymnasium Graz
- Title: Chairman of the Maria Lassnig Foundation

Peter Pakesch (born 1955 in Graz, Styria) is an Austrian exhibition curator, museum director and foundation director of the Maria Lassnig Foundation.

== Life and work ==
Peter Pakesch was born to concert pianist Gertrude Kaan (1924–2009) and Dr. Erich Pakesch (1917–1979) on the 16th of July as the second of three children.

Pakesch attended the Akademisches Gymnasium in Graz from 1965 to 1973 where he completed his secondary education. He then begun studying architecture at the Graz University of Technology, as well as practicing as an Artist from an early age. He made his first experiences as a curator at the Forum Stadtpark from 1976 to 1979, of which he had been a member since 1970. After some projects with Steirischer Herbst and the Organisation of several performances (The Kipper Kids and Reindeer Werk) with the focus on non-verbal theatre. In 1978 Pakesch organized the exhibition Kunst im Schaufenster in collaboration with Peter Weibel. 1980 he would then move to New York City for a semester abroad in the context of his studies.

After his return to Austria in 1981, Pakesch decided to open his own Gallery in Vienna. In this gallery he showed artists such as John Baldessari, Herbert Brandl, Ilya Kabakow, Mike Kelly, Martin Kippenberger, Sol LeWitt, Albert Oehlen, Franz West and Heimo Zobernig. In 1986 Pakesch and the Austrian cultural politician Helmut Strobl founded the Grazer Kunstverein, which he also led as the artistic director until 1988. During this time he also published the interdisciplinary magazine Durch. In collaboration with Hubert Klocker, Pakesch organized the project Protect Me From What I Want, a cooperation between Jenny Holzer and Keith Haring for the Vienna Festival. In 1990 Pakesch and Johannes Schlebrügge founded the Magazine Fama & Fortune Bulletin which is published at irregular intervals. In 2015 the Vienna Museum would do an exhibition about this time titled Ballgasse 6, Galerie pakesch und die Kunstszene der 80er.

In 1993 Pakesch closed his Gallery in Vienna. Over his 12 years as a Galerist he managed to push Austrian artists such as Franz West and Heimo Zobernig to international fame. In the followed years Pakesch worked as a freelancing curator for the National Gallery in Prague. 1996 he took over as the director of the Kunsthalle Basel, where he gave many young artists such as Olafur Eliasson, Michel Majerus and Paweł Althamer their first Institutional Exhibitions. During his time in Basel Pakesch also pushed for continuous renovations of the museum's buildings and he also reorganised the local annual exhibition to an entirely neu format, which under the new name 'Regionale' has stayed an important exhibition between Mulhouse, Freiburg and Basel. Between 1996 and 1998 Pakesch traveled the post-communist world as a member of the Soros International Advisory Board. 1997 he married Actress and Filmproducer Michaela Leutzendorff (1957) and in March 1998 is daughter Josepha Pakesch was born.

In 2003 Pakesch left Basel and took over as the director and artistic director of the Universalmuseum Joanneum together with Wolfgang Muchitsch who served as the executive director. During his time at the Kunsthaus Graz specifically, Pakesch curated some important exhibitions including Modell Martin Kippenberger (2007), Warhol Wool Newman - Painting and Screening Real Conner Lockhart Warhol (2009), Measuring the World (2011) and Heimo Zobernig (2013).

Between 2003 and 2008 Pakesch sat on the board of the Graz University of Technology. Since 2010 he has been a member of the board of trustees for the IBA Basel 2020.

In September 2015 Pakesch pulled out of his contract with the Universalmuseum Joanneum for personal reasons. Since then he has been serving as the chairman of the Maria Lassning Foundation. In this function he curated an exhibition about Maria Lassning in collaboration with Paul Schimmel (curator) for Hauser & Wirth in Los Angeles and London.

Most recently Pakesch curated Mike Kelley. God's Oasis at Hauser & Wirth in Zurich.

== Writing ==
- (Hrsg.): Warhol Wool Newman. Painting Real / Screening Real. Conner Lockhart Warhol Walther König, Cologne 2009, ISBN 978-3-86560-684-6.
- (Hrsg.): Leben? /Life? Biomorphe Formen in der Skulptur / Biomorphic Forms in Sculptures. Walther König, Cologne 2009, ISBN 978-3-86560-544-3.
- (Hrsg.): 2003-2008 Kunsthaus Graz. Walther König, Cologne 2008, ISBN 978-3-86560-545-0.
- (Hrsg.): Cerith Wyn Evans: bubble peddler, Buchhandlung König, Cologne 2007, ISBN 978-3-86560-208-4.
- mit Guido Magnaguagno: Bewegliche Teile. Formen des Kinetischen. Cologne: Walther König, 2005
- Michel Majerus. Installationen 1992–2002. Walther König, Cologne 2005 ISBN 978-3-88375-930-2.
- Abbild, recent portraiture and depiction. Springer, Vienna 2002, ISBN 978-3-211-83722-1.
