= Michael Krebber =

German painter (born 1954)

- Born: 26 April 1954 (age 72); Cologne, Germany
- Education: Kunstakademie Düsseldorf
- Known for: Painting
- Spouse: Cosima von Bonin

Michael Krebber (born 1954) is a German painter known for his conceptual approach, often characterized by an emphasis on the medium's limitations, an engagement with art historical references, interest in painting's relevance and persistence in contemporary art, and a tendency toward minimal gestures.

== Early life and education ==
Michael Krebber was born on 26 April 1954 in Cologne, a city that played a significant role in post-war avant-garde art movements.

Krebber studied at the Kunstakademie Düsseldorf. Krebber was significantly influenced by his time as an assistant to the German painter Martin Kippenberger, whose artistic approach resonated with Krebber's later explorations of art-making and anti-art tendencies. However, while Kippenberger often embraced excess and provocation, Krebber's approach tends to be more subdued, relying on absence, restraint, and strategic withholding.

== Work ==
Krebber is an artist creating conceptual paintings and works on paper. Rather than adhering to a signature style or thematic consistency, his oeuvre is marked by strategic inconsistencies and a self-aware approach to artistic production. He frequently employs minimal marks, sparse compositions, and seemingly unfinished gestures, prompting discussions about the purpose and boundaries of painting.

Krebber's work is often described as an intellectual and critical engagement with painting.

A key aspect of Krebber's work is his rejection of traditional painterly skill, often incorporating invoking themes of doubt, irony, and disengagement. His paintings frequently contain large areas of unpainted canvas, delicate brushstrokes, or seemingly arbitrary marks, emphasising the idea of painting as a conceptual exercise rather than a purely aesthetic endeavour. This has led critics and scholars to categorise his work within the broader context of "deskilled" painting—a term referring to an intentional avoidance of technical mastery in favor of conceptual rigor.

=== Reception ===
His work has elicited varied interpretations, with some viewing his work as a critique of artistic commodification and others as an intellectual game that resists definitive meaning.

=== Influence ===
Krebber's work influenced the "zombie formalism" debate—a term used to critique the revival of abstract painting for commercial purposes without deep conceptual engagement. His practice has been said to question the necessity of painting while continuing to practice it, making his work an important reference for artists grappling with the medium's relevance in the 21st century.

His influence is particularly evident in younger painters who challenge the boundaries of the medium through conceptual frameworks and self-referential gestures.

Krebber is a professor at the Städelschule in Frankfurt.

== Exhibitions ==
Michael Krebber has exhibited in Europe and the United States.

=== Solo ===
Year	Title	Institution	Location	Country	Ref
1993	Parallax View: New York-Köln	MoMA PS1	New York, NY	USA	
1997		Villa Arson	Nice	Italy	
2000		Wolfsburg Municipal Gallery	Wolfsburg	Germany	
2000		Braunschweig Art Association	Braunschweig	Germany	
2005	Secession		Vienna	Austria	
2008		Kölnischer Kunstverein	Cologne	Germany	
2012		CAPC Musée d'art Contemporain	Bordeaux	France	
2015		Museum Ludwig	Cologne	Germany	
2016		Serralves Museum of Contemporary Art	Porto	Portugal	
2017		Kunsthalle Bern		Switzerland	
2019		Museum Brandhorst	Munich	Germany	
2021		Fondazione Antonio Dalle Nogare	Bolzano	Italy	
2023	Esprit de Corps	Galerie Buchholz	Cologne	Germany	
2024	Michael Krebber	Greene Naftali	New York, NY	USA	

== Public collections ==
- Aïshti Foundation, Jal El Dib, Lebanon
- Art Institute of Chicago, Chicago, IL
- Bern Art Museum, Bern, Switzerland
- Centre Pompidou, Paris, France
- Hamburger Bahnhof, Hamburg, Germany
- CAPC Musée d'art Contemporain, Bordeaux, France
- Museum Brandhorst, Munich, Germany
- Museum of Contemporary Art, Los Angeles, CA
- Museum Ludwig, Cologne, Germany
- Museum of Modern Art, New York, NY
- Staatliche Museen zu Berlin, Berlin, Germany

== Publications ==
- Michael Krebber, Catalogue Raisonné, Volume 1, Ed. Sanchez, Michael, Verlag der Buchhandlung Walther und Franz König, Köln, Germany, 2022
- Michael Krebber, The Living Wedge, Part I & II, Serralves, Porto, Portugal; Kunsthalle Bern, Bern, Switzerland, 2017
- Michael Krebber, Les escargots ridiculisés, The ridiculized snails,CAPC musée d'art contemporain de Bordeaux, 2012
- Respekt Frischlinge Je Suis La Chaise London Condom, Galerie Daniel Buchholz, Galerie Chantal Crousel and Maureen Paley, 2008
- Michael Krebber: Puberty in Teaching, Buchhandlung Walther Konig GmbH & Co, 2008
- Michael Krebber, Secession / Verlag der Buchhandlung Walther König, Köln, 2005
- Michael Krebber, Kunstverein Braunschweig / Städtische Galerie Wolfsburg, 2000

== Awards ==
- 2015 – Wolfgang Hahn Prize, Museum Ludwig

== Personal life ==
Krebber lives in Cologne with his wife, artist Cosima von Bonin.
