= Diedrich Diederichsen =

German author, journalist and cultural critic

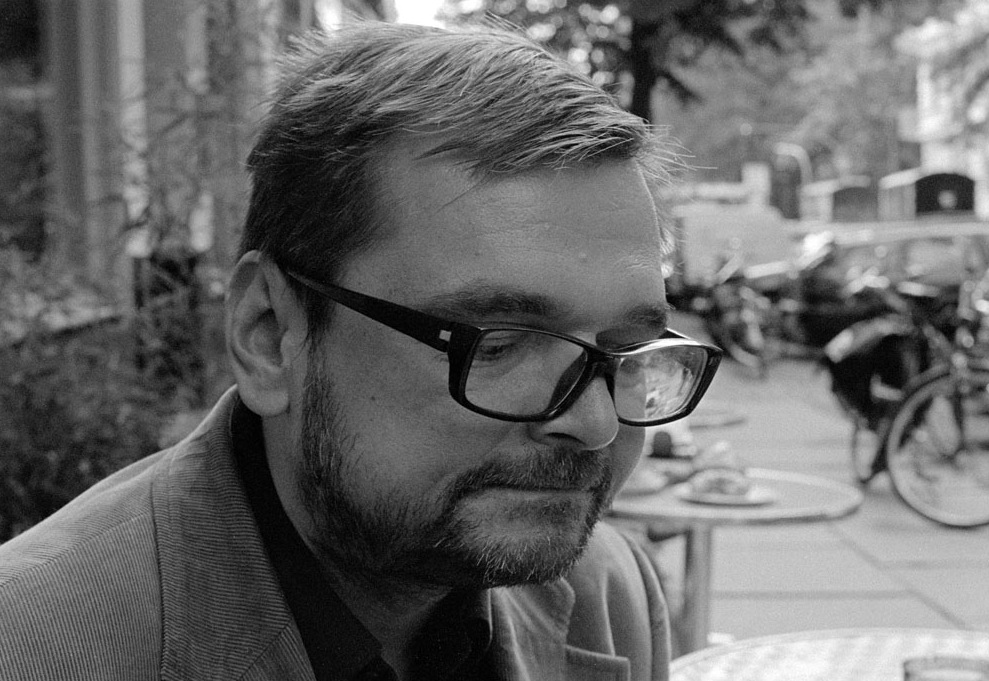
Diedrich Diederichsen, 2005

Diedrich Diederichsen (born August 15, 1957) is an intellectual German author, music journalist and cultural critic writing on the arts, politics, and pop culture. Diederichsen's writing is influenced by French Post-structuralism, Marxism, Cultural studies, New Journalism, Beat literature, Psychoanalysis, and Situationism.

== Life and work ==
Diederichsen was born and grew up in Hamburg where he worked as a music journalist and editor of the German Sounds magazine in the heyday of punk and new wave from 1979 to 1983. Until the 1990s he was the editor-in-chief of the influential subculture magazine Spex in Cologne.

In his writings Diederichsen frequently refers to personal experiences and the links between zeitgeist, biography, and history. A main topic of his writing is the tension between subjectivity, identity politics, and culture industry in Post-Fordist society.

Diederichsen is a prolific writer whose articles and texts are printed in a variety of periodicals and publications. Newspapers and magazines with contributions by Diedrich Diederichsen include Texte zur Kunst, Die Zeit, die tageszeitung, Der Tagesspiegel, Süddeutsche Zeitung, Theater heute, Artscribe, Artforum, and Frieze.

== Teaching ==
Diederichsen has worked as visiting professor in Frankfurt am Main, Stuttgart, Pasadena, Offenbach am Main, Gießen, Weimar, Bremen, Vienna, St. Louis, Cologne, Los Angeles and Gainesville. After teaching at the Merz Academy in Stuttgart for several years, in 2006 he became Professor of Theory, Practice and Communication of Contemporary Art at the Academy of Fine Arts Vienna.

== Selected works ==
- Sexbeat (1985), republished 2002
- 1500 Schallplatten. 1979–1989 (1989), republished as 2000 Schallplatten. 1979–1999 (2000)
- Freiheit macht arm. Das Leben nach Rock’n’Roll (1993)
- Politische Korrekturen (1996)
- Der lange Weg nach Mitte. Der Sound und die Stadt (1999)
- Musikzimmer. Avantgarde und Alltag (2005)
- Eigenblutdoping. Selbstverwertung, Künstlerromantik, Partizipation (2008)
- Kritik des Auges. Texte zur Kunst (2008)
- On (Surplus) Value in Art. Mehrwert und Kunst. Meerwarde En Kunst (2008)
- The Sopranos (2012)
- Über Pop-Musik (2014)
- Aesthetics of Pop Music (2023)
