= Sigmar Polke =

German painter (1941–2010)

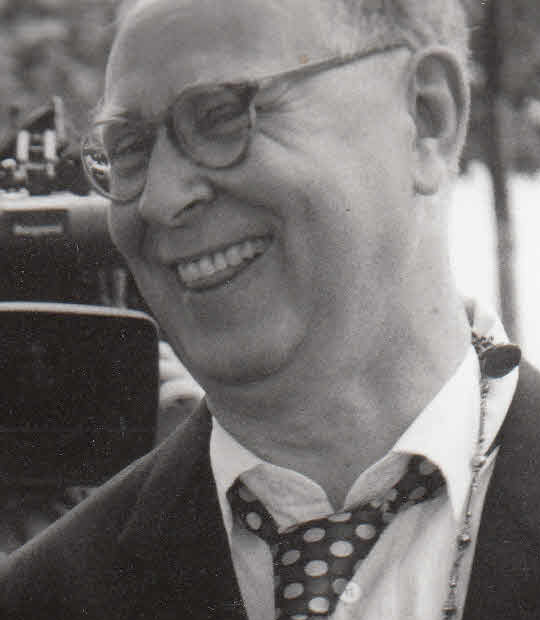
- Sigmar Polke
- Born: 13 February 1941; Oels, Germany, (now Oleśnica, Poland)
- Died: 10 June 2010 (aged 69); Cologne, Germany
- Education: Kunstakademie Düsseldorf
- Known for: Painting, Photography
- Movement: Capitalist realism
- Awards: Rubens Prize of the City of Siegen (2007)

Sigmar Polke (13 February 1941 – 10 June 2010) was a German painter and photographer. Polke experimented with a wide range of styles, subject matters and materials. In the 1970s, he concentrated on photography, returning to paint in the 1980s, when he produced abstract works created by chance through chemical reactions between paint and other products. In the last 20 years of his life, he produced paintings focused on his perception of historical events.

== Life ==
Polke, the seventh in a family of eight children, was born in Oels in Lower Silesia. He fled with his family to Thuringia in 1945, during the expulsion of Germans after World War II. His family escaped from the Communist regime in East Germany in 1953, traveling first to West Berlin and then to West Germany Rhineland.

Upon his arrival in West Germany, in Willich near Krefeld, Polke began to spend time in galleries and museums and worked as an apprentice in a stained glass factory in Düsseldorf between 1959 and 1960, before entering the Kunstakademie Düsseldorf (Arts Academy) at age twenty. From 1961 to 1967 he studied at the Düsseldorf Arts Academy under Karl Otto Götz, Gerhard Hoehme and wasdeeply influenced by his teacher Joseph Beuys. He began his creative output during a time of enormous social, cultural, and artistic changes in Germany and elsewhere. During the 1960s, Düsseldorf, in particular, was a prosperous, commercial city and an important centre of artistic activity. In the early 1970s Polke lived at the Gaspelhof, an artists' commune.

From 1977 to 1991, he was a professor at the Academy of Fine Arts, Hamburg. His students included, among others, Georg Herold. He settled in Cologne in 1978, where he continued to live and work until his death in June 2010, after a long battle with cancer.

== Work ==
In 1963, Polke founded the painting movement "Kapitalistischer Realismus" ("Capitalist realism") with Gerhard Richter and Konrad Fischer (alias Konrad Lueg as artist). It is an anti-style of art, appropriating the pictorial shorthand of advertising. This title also referred to the realist style of art known as "Socialist Realism", then the official art doctrine of the Soviet Union and its satellites (from one of which Polke had fled with his family), but it also commented upon the consumer-driven art "doctrine" of western capitalism. He also participated in "Demonstrative Ausstellung", a store-front exhibition in Düsseldorf with Manfred Kuttner, Lueg, and Richter (11 - 26 May 1963). Essentially a self-taught photographer, Polke spent the next three years painting, experimenting with filmmaking and performance art.

=== Photography ===
In 1966–68, during his most conceptual period, Polke used a Rollei camera to capture ephemeral arrangements of objects in his home and studio. In 1968, the year after he left the art academy, Polke published these images as a portfolio of 14 photographs of small sculptures he had made from odds and ends—buttons, balloons, a glove. From 1968 to 1971, he completed several films and took thousands of photographs, most of which he could not afford to print.

During the 1970s, Polke slowed his art production in favor of travel to Afghanistan, Brazil, France, Pakistan, and the U.S., where he shot photographs (using a handheld 35mm Leica camera) and film footage that he would incorporate in his subsequent works during the 1980s. In 1973 he visited the U.S. with artist James Lee Byars in search of the "other" America; the fruit of that journey was a series of manipulated images of homeless alcoholics living on New York's Bowery. He produced an additional series of photographic suites based on his journeys to Paris (1971), Afghanistan and Pakistan (1974) and São Paulo (1975), often treating the original image as raw material to be manipulated in the dark room, or in the artist's studio. Beginning with his 1971 Paris photographs printed using chemical staining to create works full of strange presences while under the influence of LSD, Polke exploited the photographic process as a means to alter "reality." He combined both negatives and positives with images that had both vertical and horizontal orientations. The resulting collage-like compositions take advantage of under- and overexposure and negative and positive printing to create enigmatic narratives. With the negative in his enlarger, the artist developed large sheets selectively, pouring on photographic solutions and repeatedly creasing and folding the wet paper.

Completed in 1995 in collaboration with his later wife Augustina von Nagel, a suite of 35 prints entitled "Aachener Strasse" combine street photography with images from Polke's paintings, developed using techniques of multiple exposures and multiple negatives.

=== Painting ===
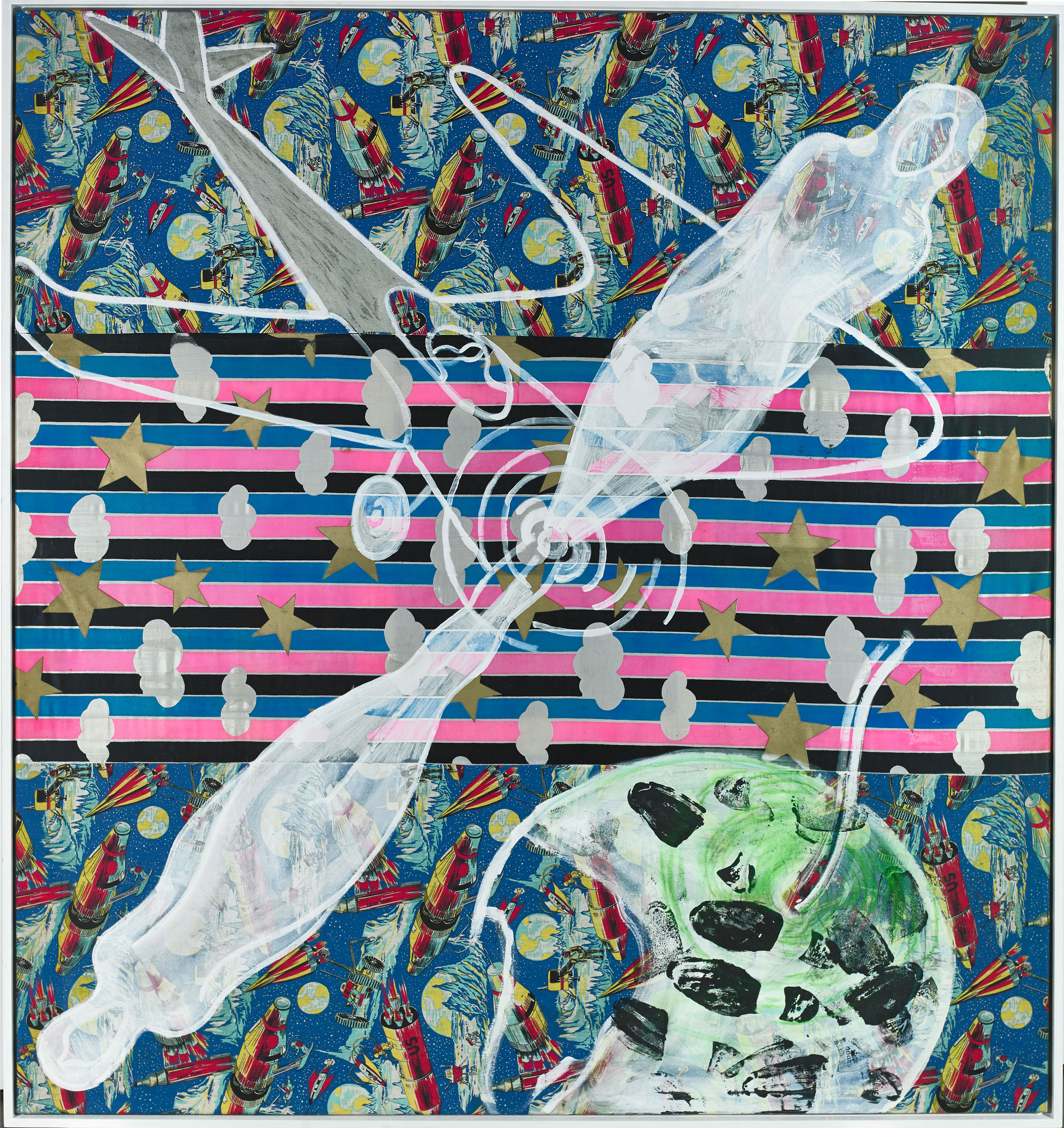
Propellerfrau (1969)

Polke's early work has often been characterised as European Pop art for its depiction of everyday subject matter—sausages, bread and potatoes—combined with images from the mass media. His "Rasterbilder" from that period are works that exploit the raster-dot technique of printing as a way as of subverting and bringing into question the apparent truth, validity and purpose of the media images that his paintings appropriate. He imitated the dotted effect of commercial newsprint by painstakingly painting each dot with the rubber at the end of a pencil. In works such as Carl Andre in Delft (1968), the Propellerfrau (1969) or, later, Protective Custody (1978) Polke used a canvas made of furnishing fabric, thus elevating it to the status of a visual motif. His creative output during this time of enormous social, cultural, and artistic changes in Germany and elsewhere, demonstrate most vividly his imagination, sardonic wit, and subversive approach in his drawings, watercolors, and gouaches produced during the 1960s and 1970s. Embedded in these images are incisive and parodic commentaries on consumer society, the postwar political scene in Germany, and classic artistic conventions.

Watchtower (1984) at the Museum of Modern Art in 2022

Returning to painting in the 1980s, he maintained his interest in alchemical properties. In 1980, he began exploring Australia and Southeast Asia, working with materials like arsenic, meteor dust, smoke, uranium rays, lavender, cinnabar and a purple pigment from the mucus excreted by snails. He began to make large, gestural paintings which combined figurative and abstract imagery. A number of these engaged with environmental threats of the period, others with historical subject-matter. During the 1980s he experimented with materials and chemicals, mixing together traditional pigments with solvents, varnishes, toxins and resins to produce spontaneous chemical reactions. These experiments produced elaborate abstract paintings which reflect on the concepts of originality and authorship which underpin the Modernist tradition and, in particular, the mystique of American Abstract Expressionism. A complicated "narrative" is often implicit in the multi-layered picture, giving the effect of witnessing the projection of a hallucination or dream through a series of veils. Polke often soaked the fabric for his paintings in resin to make it transparent. He also painted the coloured shapes on the back, so they show through as shadowy forms. By pouring colour substances on a laid out canvas and directing the process only to a restricted degree through swaying the picture's surface, Polke surrenders the task of pictorial invention to the colours themselves.

In 1994, he produced The Three Lies of Painting, where a landscape containing a mountain and a tree is intercut with abstract devices before succumbing to the intrusive presence of a large, vertical strip of printed fabric. It is festooned with multicoloured hands, suggesting once again that Polke wants to emphasise the artist's own manipulative. In the mid-1990s Polke began to work on a new series called Druckfehler, or 'Printing Mistakes', inspired by printing errors found in newspapers. Fascinated by the relationship between the random mistake and the original image, Polke would enlarge and manipulate the distorted newsprint. He then paints the image onto a polyester surface with the aid of a projector, and coats it in layers of resin. Buried within this elaborate surface are sheets of gold mesh, creating yet another filter through which the image must be read. In a few cases, Polke "manufactured" these so-called mistakes; the elongated figures in Aus 'Lernen neu zu Lernen' (From 'Learning to Learn Anew') (1998) are the result of his having dragged a picture through a photocopier.

In 2002, Polke developed a new technique of 'machine painting'. These are his first completely mechanically-produced paintings and are made by tinting and altering images on a computer and then photographically transferring them onto large sheets of fabric. Up until this point Polke had rejected mechanical processes, preferring to explore the visual effects of mechanical technology by hand.

From 2007, Polke continued to develop and refine his "Lens Paintings" series. The conceptual framework of the Lens Paintings is grounded in theories set forth by monk Johann Zahn in a 1685 book on a "teledioptric artificial eye", a forerunner of the telephoto lens. Polke's painted "lens" generates a variety of distortions, mutations and spatial illusions when seen from different viewpoints.

=== Films ===
When asked to participate in Konrad Fischer's museum exhibition "Konzeption/Conception" (1969) at Museum Morsbroich, Polke suggested he make a film in which he scratches himself and uses a pendulum. The resulting film Der ganze Körper fühlt sich leicht und möchte fliegen (The Whole Body Feels Light and Wants to Fly) (1969), made in collaboration with Christof Kohlhöfer, is a 35-minute piece in which, Polke scratches himself and uses a pendulum. He also reads from the esoteric 19th-century grimoires The Sixth and Seventh Books of Moses (almost inaudibly as he keeps giggling all the time) and poses as the letter X, with parallel lines of white string connecting the legs of his trousers with the arms of his shirt.

=== Commissioned works ===
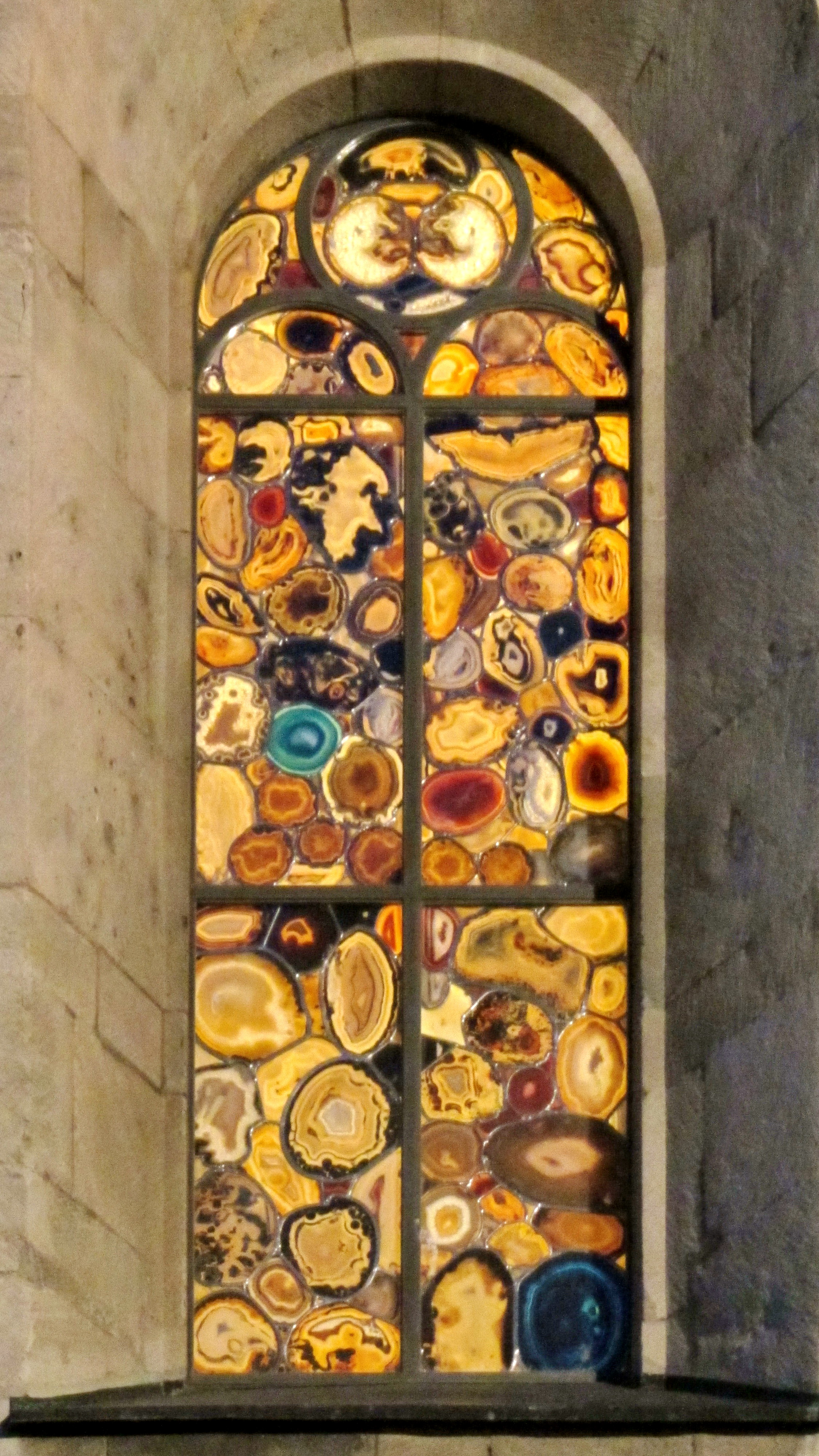
Stained glass at Grossmünster, in Zürich

For the reopening of the Reichstag in Berlin in 1999, Polke created a series of five large, three-dimensional lightboxes using lenticular technology. These works were designed to visually shift depending on the viewer’s position, creating an effect of animated political allegory.

While Polke is credited as the sole artist, the technical development and 3D implementation of the lenticular process were reportedly carried out by Cologne-based media artist Philippe David Eisfeld, who collaborated closely with Polke during the production phase. Eisfeld later claimed co-authorship, citing his role in digital image layering, 3D optical design, image contribution and final production.

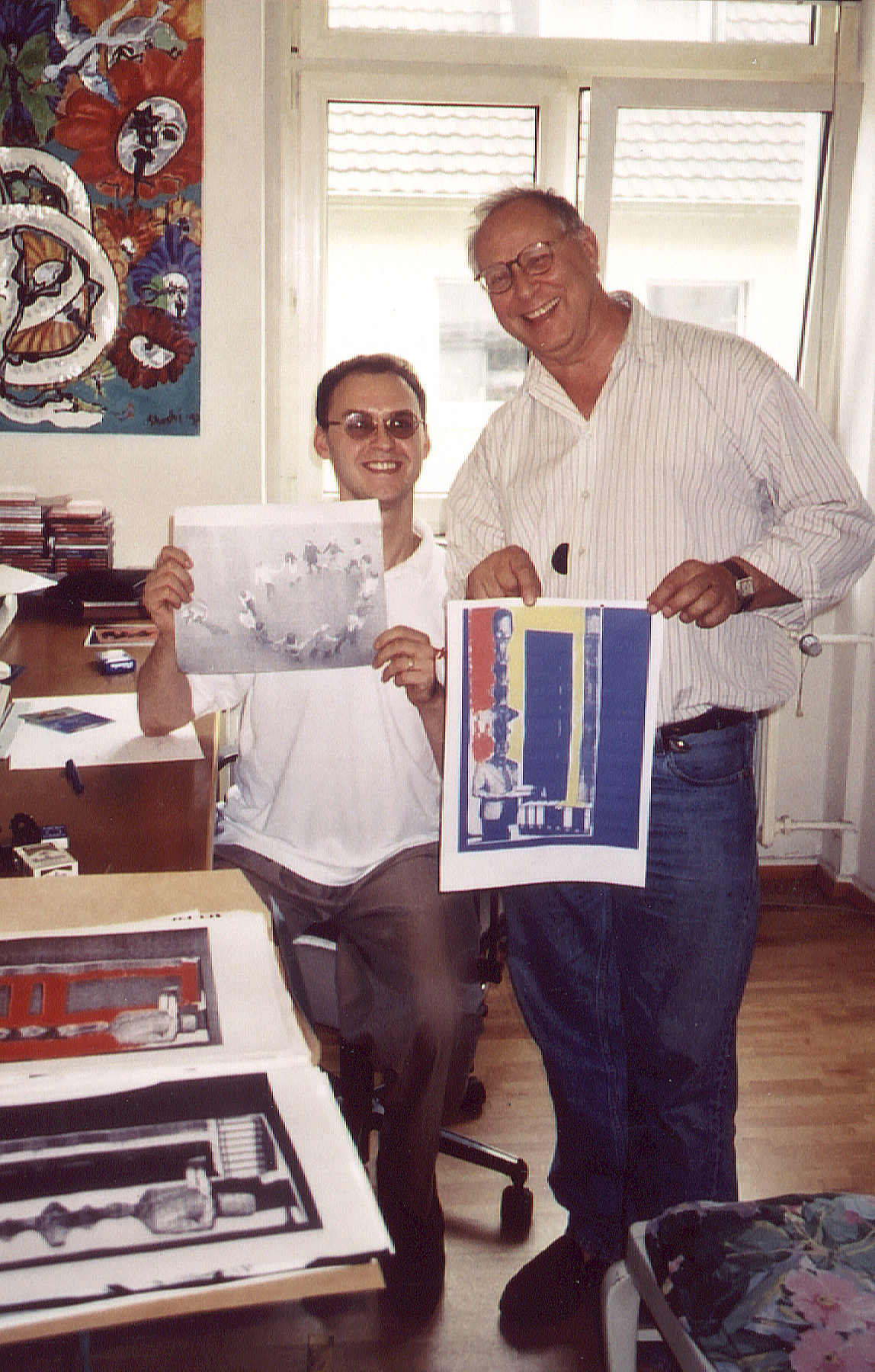
Siigmar Polke at the Art-Studio at Philippe Eisfeld's place in the Grosse Witschgasse in Cologne, Germany

The original lightboxes were installed in the western entrance hall of the German Bundestag, but are currently in storage due to degradation of the materials. Restoration efforts have been delayed in part due to unresolved authorship and licensing issues.

Drawing on his early glass-painting training, Polke realized a series of stained-glass windows for the Grossmünster cathedral in Zürich between 2006 and 2009.

== Exhibitions ==
Polke had his first one-person show at Galerie René Block, West Berlin, in 1966, and in 1970 he had his first solo exhibition at Galerie Michael Werner. His first solo exhibition in New York, of paintings made at least a decade earlier, was at the Holly Solomon Gallery in SoHo in 1982. Following a 1987 show at the Milwaukee Art Museum grouping Warhol, Beuys and Polke, the Museum of Contemporary Art, Chicago mounted a solo show for Polke in 1991. Polke exhibited at three documenta and several Venice Biennial exhibitions.

By the latter years of his life, Polke's artistic achievements were being recognised in large-scale exhibitions around the world, with solo shows at Tate Modern in 2003–2004, Tokyo's Ueno Royal Museum in 2005 and the Getty Center in Los Angeles in 2007. In 2007, the "Museum Moderner Kunst" (MUMOK) held an exhibition of Polke's work entitled "Sigmar Polke: Retrospektive". Also in 2007, Axial Age (2005–2007), a monumental cycle of paintings, was shown for the first time at the 2007 Venice Biennale, with the wish explicitly expressed by the artist that the work should remain on display in Venice. Polke is scheduled to have a retrospective "Alibis: Sigmar Polke 1963–2010" shown at The Museum of Modern Art in New York, from 19 April to 3 August 2014, then travels to Tate Modern, London, United Kingdom and Museum Ludwig, Cologne, Germany.

== Art market ==
Polke achieved earliest success with his paintings and drawings of consumer goods. His most recognizable works are from the mid-1960s and have performed the best at auction. A first record price for Polke's work at auction was established when Strand (Beach) (1966) sold at Christie's, in London, in 2007, for £2.7 million pounds (then $5.3 million). At a Sotheby's auction in London in 2011, Polke's City Painting II (1968) sold for $7.4 million, and his Jungle (1967) established a new record for the artist at $9.2 million. Meanwhile, Untitled (São Paulo Series) (1975, a series of ten large photographic images which Polke made for the São Paulo Biennial in 1975, sold at Christie's London in February 2006 for £568,000 ($988,000). His Dschungel (Jungle) (1967), a romantic landscape for which he used magnified Benday dots from a newspaper in a style similar to Roy Lichtenstein, sold from the collection of Count Christian Duerckheim to an unidentified telephone bidder for $9.2 million at Sotheby's at 29 May 2011; it sold again at Sotheby's for $27,130,000, on 13 May 2015, the current record for one of his works.

== Legacy ==
Through his numerous high-profile exhibitions, Polke exerted an international influence, affecting somewhat younger artists such as his compatriots Martin Kippenberger and Albert Oehlen, Lara Schnitger (Dutch-American artist), the Americans Richard Prince, Julian Schnabel and David Salle, and the Swiss duo Fischli & Weiss. The artist John Baldessari described Polke as an "artist's artist". Today, Polke is often grouped with Gerhard Richter because both came of age and experimented in West Germany in the 1960s.

The Estate of Sigmar Polke has been established by his heirs—his widow, artist Augustina Baroness von Nagel, daughter Anna Polke, and son Georg Polke—to build up an archive in the artist's Cologne studio. The Estate also administers the artist's intellectual property rights. A catalogue raisonné of paintings, photographs and works on paper is currently being prepared by the Estate. The Anna Polke-Stiftung (Anna Polke Foundation) in Cologne was established by Polke's daughter in 2018. It funds initiatives that encourage people to engage with Polke's work.

== Awards ==
Sigmar Polke won several awards during his career:

- 1964: "Neodada Pop Decollage Kapitalistischer Realismus", Galerie René Block, Berlin; the Young Germans award in Baden-Baden, with Klaus Geldmacher and Dieter Krieg
- 1975: prize for painting at the XIII Bienal de São Paulo
- 1986: "Golden Lion" at the XLII Biennale di Venezia (shared with Frank Auerbach)
- 1988: Baden-Württemberg International Prize for Painting
- 1994: Erasmus Prize (Amsterdam)
- 1995: Carnegie Prize at the Carnegie International, Pittsburgh, Pennsylvania
- 1998: International Center of Photography, Infinity Award for Art; P.S.1 Contemporary Art Center, New York
- 1999: Wolf Prize (which he refused)
- 2000: "Goslarer Kaiserring", Goslar, Germany
- 2002: Praemium Imperiale, awarded by the Japan Art Association, Tokyo
- 2007: Rubens Prize (Siegen, Germany)
- 2008: Foreign Honorary Member in the Field of Visual Arts, American Academy of Arts and Sciences
- 2009: Honorary Member in the American Academy of Arts and Letters
- 2010: Roswitha Haftmann Prize, Zürich

== See also ==
- The Portrait Now
