= Markus Oehlen =

German visual artist

- Born: 1956 (age 69–70)
- Known for: painting, sculpture, music
- Movement: Junge Wilde

Markus Oehlen (born 1956) is a German painter, sculpture and musician. In the 1970s and 80s he was a founding member of the influential neo-expressionist art movement Neue Wilde in Düsseldorf, alongside Martin Kippenberger, Markus Lüpertz, and his brother Albert Oehlen.

== Biography ==
Markus Oehlen was born in Krefeld. His father, Adolf Oehlen, was a graphic designer and cartoonist. Oehlen completed an apprenticeship as a technical draftsman, from 1971 to 1973. He studied at the Düsseldorf Art Academy, from 1976 to 1982, where he was a student with Alfonso Hüppi. In 1977 he met Martin Kippenberger.

In 1981 he formed the “Church of Indifference” together with Werner Büttner and his brother Albert. In the same year he exhibited at Rundschau Deutschland. In 1984 he was represented at the exhibition From Here - Two Months of New German Art, in Düsseldorf. In 1987 he received the Berlin Art Prize. In 1993 he held the exhibition “Projects 39”, together with Georg Herold, at the Museum of Modern Art, in New York. Since 2002, Oehlen has held a professorship at the Kunstakademie Düsseldorf, in Munich.

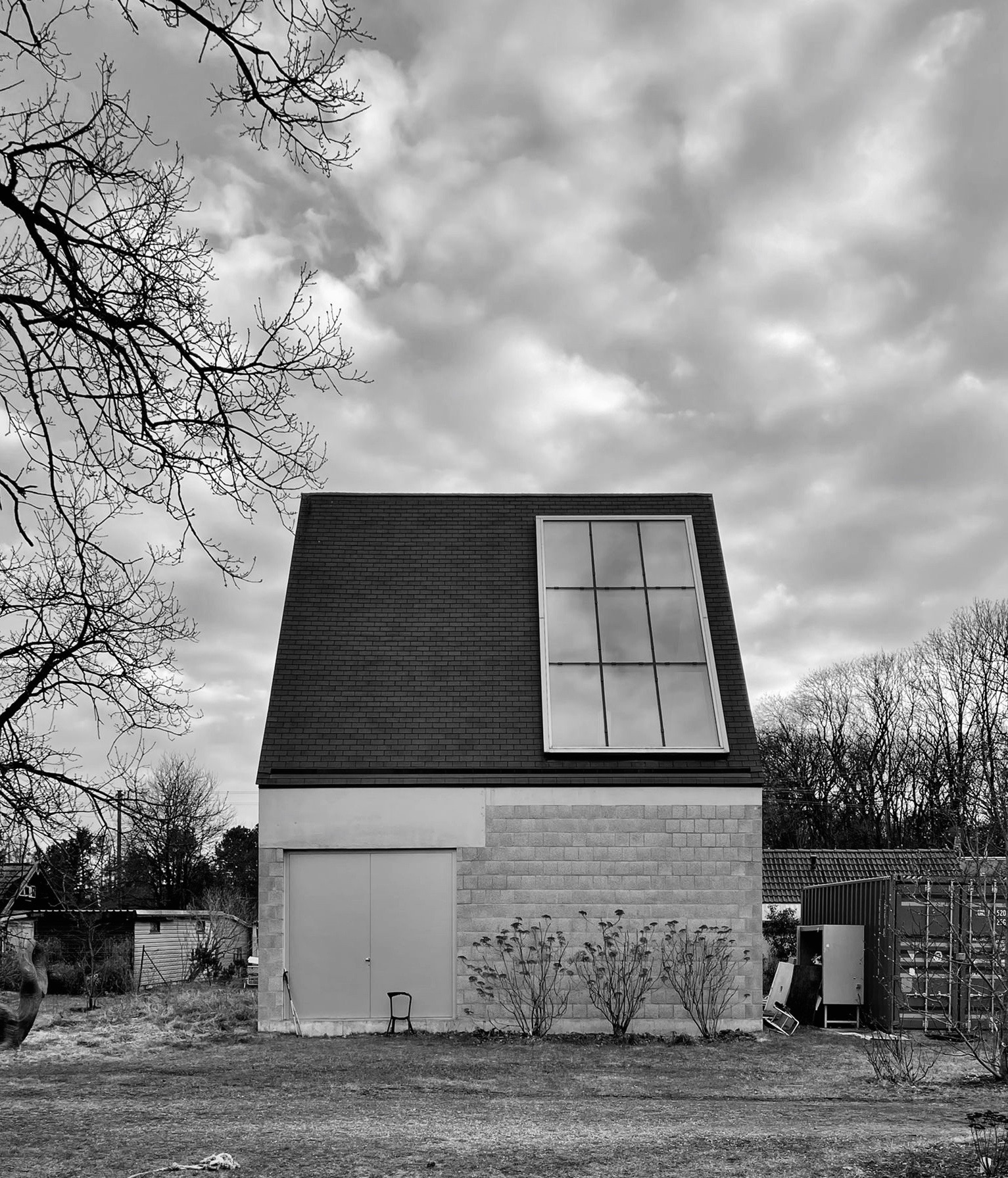
Markus Oehlen Studio, in Munich

Since 2017, Oehlen has been working in a studio built by Westner Schührer Zöhrer in the north of Munich. The house was awarded the Bauwelt Prize in 2019 and an award at the BDA Prize Bavaria.

== Artwork ==
Oehlen is one of the main representatives of the Neue Wilden. His works are a commentary on the standardized values of the bourgeoisie. Oehlen's work presents a revolt, in a sort punk style, often in dark-toned imagery against the apathy caused by prosperity in the 1980s and to minimalist art. Following the tradition of Dada and Fluxus, he worked to dismantle traditional concepts of art. What is characteristic of his paintings is the overlaying of various motifs in a dense, impasto style and the borrowings from pop culture. His diverse working techniques and layered image structure suggests a comparison with the effect of sampling in contemporary music. In addition to painting, he also creates sculptures from Styrofoam bodies.

== Musical activity ==
Oehlen was a member of the punk band Charley's Girls, and also of Mittagspause and Fehlfarben. He worked mainly as a drummer in the music project Flying Klassenfield, among others. He also worked as a DJ at Ratinger Hof.
